= List of Durban suburbs =

This is a list of suburbs in the eThekwini Metropolitan Municipality which includes the city of Durban and surrounding towns. Some of these are commonly used names for regions, collections of suburbs (e.g. Bluff), or formerly independent towns that are themselves composed of suburbs (e.g. Kingsburgh, Queensburgh, Westville) and do not necessarily correspond to specific legal townships, or suburbs.

== North ==
- Desainager
- Durban North
- eMdloti (Umdloti)
  - Sibaya Coastal City
- Genazzano
- Inanda
- KwaMashu
- La Mercy
- Mount Edgecombe
- Mount Moreland
- Newlands East
  - Riverhorse Valley
- Newlands West
- Phoenix
- oThongathi (Tongaat)
- Tongaat Beach
- uMhlanga
  - La Lucia
- Verulam
- Westbrook

== Central ==
- Avoca
- Bellair
- Berea
- Bulwer
- Essenwood
- Glenwood
- Greyville
- Manor Gardens
- Morningside
- Musgrave
- Sydenham
- Umbilo
- Windermere
- Bluff
  - Brighton Beach
  - Merebank
  - Merewent
  - Wentworth
  - Treasure Beach
- Cato Crest (Mayville)
- Cato Manor
- Hillary
- Memorial Park
- Mobeni
- Montclair
- Mount Vernon
- Overport
- Rossburgh
- Seaview
- Sherwood
- Springfield
- Springfield Park
- Stamford Hill
- Woodhaven
- Woodlands
- Yellowwood Park

== South ==
- Adams Mission
- Amanzimtoti
  - Athlone Park
  - Umbogintwini
- Clansthal
- Craigieburn
- eMkhomazi (Umkomaas)
  - Widenham
- Folweni
- Ilfracombe
- Illovo
- Isipingo
  - Isipingo Beach
  - Isipingo Rail
  - Isipingo Hills
  - Lotus Park
  - Malaba Hills
- Kingsburgh
  - Doonside
  - Illovo Beach
  - Karridene
  - Warner Beach
  - Winklespruit
- KwaMakhutha
- Magabeni
- Malangeni
- Prospecton
- Umbumbulu
- Umgababa
- Umlazi
  - Reunion

== Outer West ==
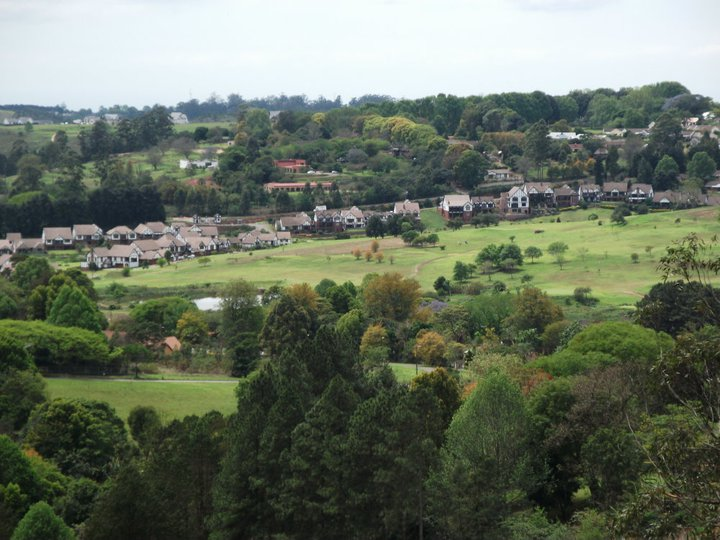
Botha's Hill

- Alverstone
- Assagay
- Botha's Hill
- Cato Ridge
  - Harrison
- Cliffdale
- Clifton Canyon
- Drummond
- Everton
- Gillitts
  - Winston Park
- Hillcrest
- Inchanga
  - Fredville
  - Monteseel
- Kloof
  - Forest Hills
  - Wyebank (Motalabad)
- KwaXimba
- Molweni
- Mpumalanga (Hammarsdale)
- Peacevale
- Shongweni
  - Westown
- Summerveld
- Waterfall
  - Crestholme

== Inner West ==
- Chatsworth
  - Arena Park
  - Lamontville
  - Umhlatuzana
  - Welbedacht
- Clermont
- Dassenhoek
- Klaarwater
- KwaDabeka
- KwaNdengezi
- Maryvale
- Pinetown
  - Cowies Hill
  - Mariannhill
  - Mariannridge
  - Moseley
  - Nazareth
  - New Germany
  - Sarnia
  - Savanna Park
  - St Wendolins Ridge
  - Thornwood
- Queensburgh
  - Escombe
  - Malvern
  - Northdene
  - Shallcross
- Reservoir Hills
- Westville
  - Atholl Heights
  - Berea West
  - Chiltern Hills
  - Dawncliffe
  - Dawncrest
  - Grayleigh
