= Berea, Durban =

Berea
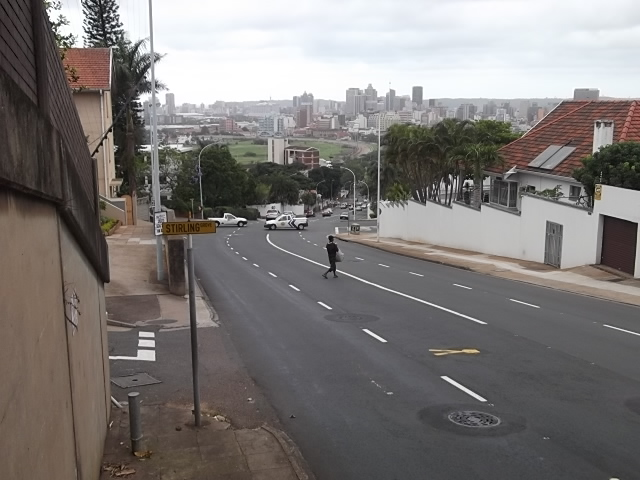

- Location within KwaZulu-Natal Location within South Africa
- Coordinates: 29°51′03″S 30°59′35″E
- Country: South Africa
- Province: KwaZulu-Natal
- Municipality: eThekwini

Area
  - Total: 24.68 km^{2} (9.53 sq mi)

Population (2011)
  - Total: 102,920
  - Density: 4,170/km^{2} (10,800/sq mi)

Racial makeup (2011)
  - Black African: 41.3%
  - Coloured: 4.6%
  - Indian/Asian: 26.1%
  - White: 26.5%
  - Other: 1.5%

First languages (2011)
  - English: 61.0%
  - Zulu: 22.2%
  - Xhosa: 3.7%
  - Afrikaans: 3.6%
  - Other: 9.4%
- Time zone: UTC+2 (SAST)
- Postal code (street): 4001
- PO box: n/a
- Area code: 031

The Berea is a ridge above the city of Durban, KwaZulu-Natal, South Africa on the northern side which overlooks the city centre and the Indian Ocean. Berea is also used as a collective designation for the suburbs in the area. It has been described as the area between the Howard College Campus of the University of KwaZulu-Natal and the Burman Bush Nature Reserve.

Some of the oldest mansions in Durban were built in this once-forested area. Today, many of these have been converted into offices or made way for apartment buildings. The Berea was once the most expensive real-estate area in the province but is now third to uMhlanga and Durban North.

The two main areas of the Berea are Musgrave, Bulwer, and upper Glenwood, which are separated by the N3 national route that leads into the city centre. A related neighbouring area designation is Overport. The Berea borders the orange-roofed Durban suburb of Morningside.

Durbanites who have called Berea their home include cricketer Andrew Hudson, radio personality Alan Khan, and TV presenter Imraan Vagar.

== Places of Interest ==
Places of interest include:

- Burman Bush Nature Reserve
  - Situated at the northernmost end of the Berea in Morningside, Burman Bush is a 55 hectare enclave of remaining indigenous coastal forest forming part of the Durban Metropolitan Open Space System (D’MOSS).
- Durban Botanic Gardens
  - Situated in Musgrave towards the base of the Berea near the Greyville Racecourse. Covering an area of 15 hectares (37 acres), it is oldest public institution in Durban and the oldest surviving botanical gardens in Africa.
- Durban United Hebrew Congregation
  - Situated in Musgrave, the congregation has been in existence in the Berea since the early twentieth century.
- Florida Road
  - Situated in Windermere, Florida Road is a 2 kilometre stretch of restaurants, cafes, pubs, nightclubs, art galleries and eclectic shops such as tobacconists and tattoo parlours. It has grown to become one of the prime tourist destinations for tourists to Durban as well as the entertainment hub of the inner city.
- Hollywoodbets Greyville Racecourse
  - Officially opened in July 1897, the racecourse is popular known for being host to the Hollywoodbets Durban July, the greatest horse racing and social event in Africa.
- Howard College Campus of the University of KwaZulu-Natal
- Jameson Park
  - Situated in Morningside, south of Mitchell Park, Jameson Park is a public park which is dubbed as the “rose haven” of Durban, home to 600 rose bushes and 200 species of roses.
- Mitchell Park Zoo
  - Situated in Morningside, Mitchell Park is the only zoo in Durban, home to 91 species and 701 animals.

== In popular culture ==
Berea in the 1950s is described by the writer Alan Paton in the novel Ah, but Your Land Is Beautiful as being notable for its "stately indigenous trees".

== Geography ==
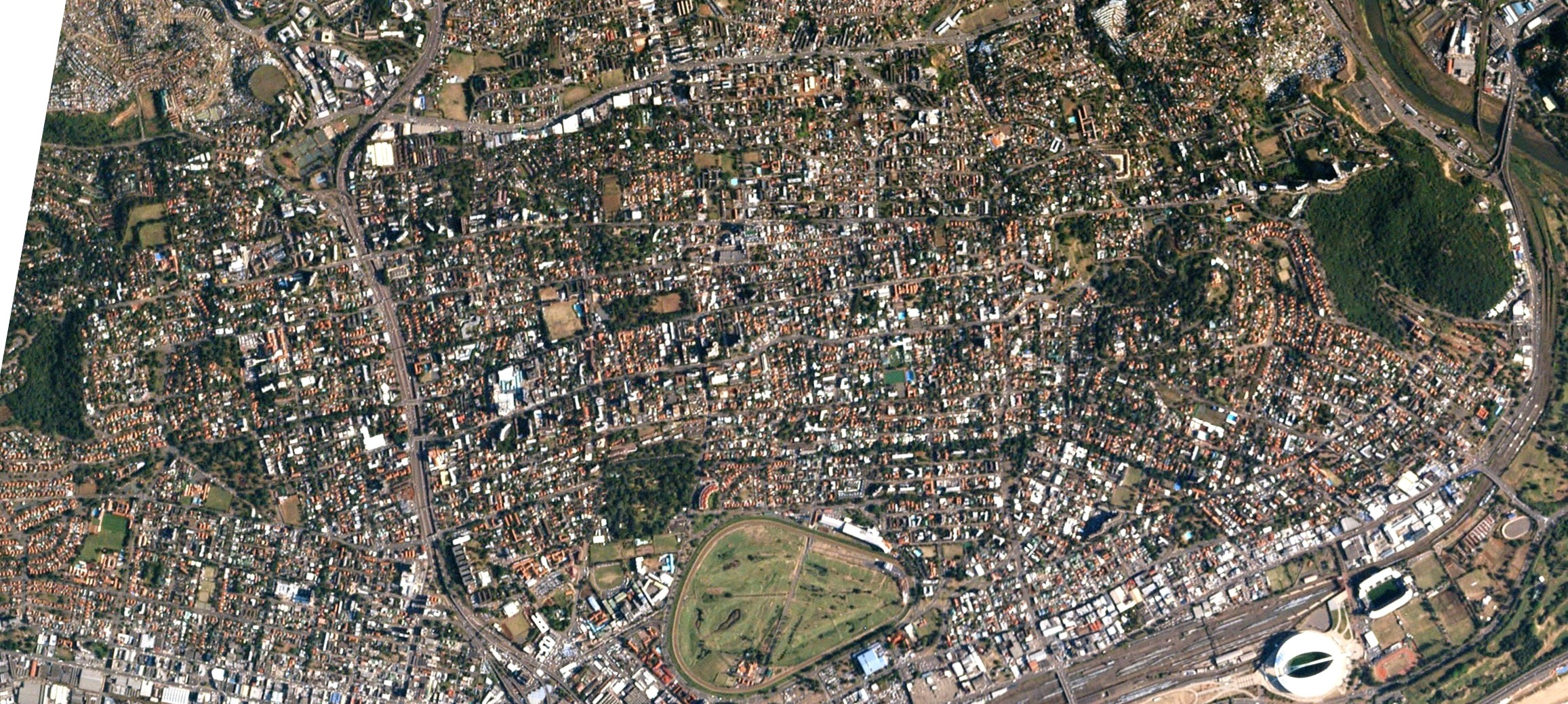
Aerial view of the northern section of the Berea, from Pigeon Valley at left (or south) to Burman Bush, far right

The elevation of the Berea reaches approximately 140 (459,3 mi) to 150 (492,1 mi) metres above sea level along the length of the Peter Mokaba Ridge and Masizi Kunene Road, straddling Upper Morningside, Overport, upper parts of Musgrave, Westridge, Bulwer and the UKZN Howard College Campus.

Moreover, the Berea extends between Morningside in the north and Umbilo in the south, bordering on the uMngeni River to the north and the following neighbourhoods:

- Springfield to the north-west
- Stamford Hill, North Beach and Durban Central to the east
- KwaKhangela and Bayhead to the south-east
- Sea View, Glenmore and Carrington Heights to the south
- uMkumbaan and Bellair to the south-west
- Wiggins, Bonela, Cato Crest, Clare Hills and Sparks to the west.

== Demographics ==
In the 2001 Census, data was provided for the individual sub-places of Stellawood, Umbilo, Glenwood, Bulwer, University of KwaZulu-Natal, Musgrave, Greyville, Berea North, Overport, Sydenham, Essenwood, Morningside, and Windermere, all of which were classified under the main place of Durban. However, by the time of the 2011 Census, these areas—excluding Essenwood— were consolidated into a single sub-place known as “Berea,” still under the main place of Durban. Consequently, the 2011 Census does not offer disaggregated data for the individual suburbs that make up the Berea (except Essenwood).

== Education ==
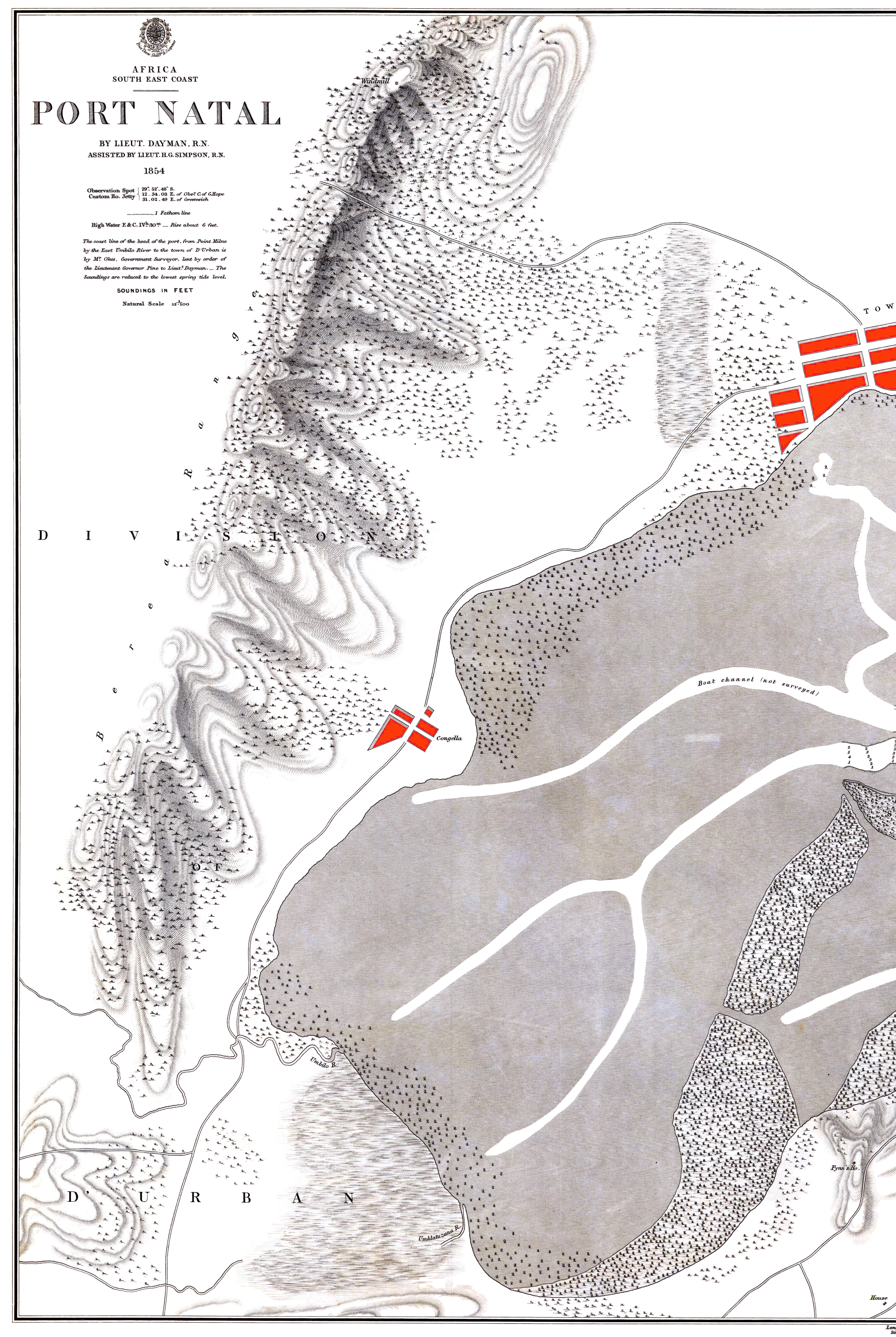
An 1856 map of the Berea Range (southern section), with Port Natal (current Durban Central) and Congella shown in red.

Schools situated in the Berea include:

- Clarence Primary School
- Clifton School
- Durban Girls' College
- Durban Girls’ Secondary School
- Durban High School
- Glenwood High School
- Glenwood Preparatory School
- Hartley Road Primary School
- Hunt Road Secondary School
- Maris Stella School for Girls
- Penzance Primary School
- St. Henry's Marist Brothers' College

== Healthcare ==
=== Private Hospitals ===
- Ascot Park Hospital, Greyville
- Life Entabeni Hospital, Westridge
- Netcare Parklands Hospital, Overport
- Netcare St Augustine’s Hospital, Bulwer

=== Public Hospitals ===
- McCord Provincial Eye Hospital, Musgrave
- St Aidan’s Mission Regional Hospital, Greyville
- Victoria Mxenge Hospital, Umbilo

== Retail ==
Berea is primarily a residential area, featuring several shopping centres throughout the area, such as:

- Berea Centre, Bulwer
- City View Shopping Centre, Greyville
- Davenport Square, Bulwer
- Glenwood Village Shopping Centre, Bulwer
- Musgrave Centre, Musgrave
- Queensmead Mall, Umbilo
- The Atrium, Overport
- Windermere Centre

== Safety ==
In terms of policing, the Berea is covered by five SAPS policing precincts including:

- Berea: covers Musgrave, western part of Windermere, most of Essenwood and Morningside
- Durban Central: covers eastern part of Windermere
- Mayville: covers western part of Overport, easternmost part of Essenwood, western part of Sydenham and easternmost part of Morningside
- Sydenham: covers most of Sydenham and eastern part of Overport
- Umbilo: covers Bulwer, Glenwood, University of KwaZulu-Natal and Umbilo

== Transport ==
=== Roads ===
Key arterial routes in the Berea include:

- N3 (Western Freeway) – connects Durban city centre to the east with Pietermaritzburg to the north-west. The Berea can be accessed from the N3 via the interchanges at Felix Dlamini Road (exit 4), Peter Mokaba Ridge/Masizi Kunene Road (exit 3) and King Dinuzulu Road (exit 2).
- R102 (Umbilo Road; Sydney Road; Umgeni Road) – connects Rossburgh and Mobeni to the south with Avoca to the north via Umbilo, Glenwood, Greyville, Windermere and Morningside.
- M8 (Problem Mkhize Road; Edith Benson Crescent; Botanic Gardens Road; Cleaver Road; Bulwer Road; ZK Matthews Road) – connects Essenwood to the north with Glenwood to the south via Musgrave and Bulwer.
- M13 (King Dinuzulu Road North and South) – connects Durban city centre to the east with Sherwood and Westville to the west via Bulwer and Musgrave.
- The M15 (Locksley Drive; Moses Kotane Road; South Road; John Zikhali Road; Gladys Manzi Road) – connects Durban city centre to the east with Sherwood to the west via Greyville, Essenwood, Musgrave and Overport.
- M17 (Sandile Thusi Road; Springfield Road) connects Stamford Hill to the east with Springfield to the west via Windermere, Essenwood and Morningside.
- M32 (Rick Turner Road) – connects Maydon Wharf and KwaKhangela to the east with Cato Manor to the west via Glenwood, Umbilo and the University of KwaZulu-Natal.
