= List of shopping centres in South Africa =

This is a list of notable shopping centres in South Africa with the aim of including all (and only) shopping centres (including the larger classification of shopping malls), with at least two anchor stores.

The names of the central settlement (e.g., Pretoria) are mentioned in the section titles only for the convenience of international readers who may not be familiar with the names of the metropolitan municipalities (e.g., Tshwane).

== North West ==
Shopping centre	Location
Autumn Leaf Mall	Zeerust
Brits Mall	Brits
City Mall	Klerksdorp
The Crossing	
Lichtenburg Mall	Lichtenburg
Mahikeng Mall	Mahikeng
Matlosana Mall	Klerksdorp
Mooiriver Mall	Potchefstroom
Morena Mall	
Rustenburg Mall	Rustenburg
Waterfall Mall	Rustenburg

== Eastern Cape ==
=== Buffalo City incl. East London ===
Shopping centre	Location
Amalinda Square	Amalinda, East London
Beacon Bay Crossing	Beacon Bay
Beacon Bay Retail Park	Beacon Bay
Berea Mall	Berea, East London
Gillwell Mall	East London Central, East London
Hemmingways Mall	Ocean View, East London
The Mall	King William's Town
Mdantsane City Mall	Mdantsane
Stone Towers	King William's Town
Vincent Park	Vincent, East London

=== Nelson Mandela Bay incl. Port Elizabeth ===
Shopping centre	Location
Aloe Mall	Uitenhage
Baywest Mall	Hunters Retreat, Port Elizabeth
Corkwood Square	Uitenhage
Gardens Centre	Lorraine, Port Elizabeth
Greenacres	Greenacres, Port Elizabeth
Metlife Plaza	Kabega Park, Port Elizabeth
Moffet On Main	Walmer, Port Elizabeth
Pier 14	North End, Port Elizabeth
Sunridge Village	Sunridge Park, Port Elizabeth
Uitenhage Mall	Uitenhage
Walker Drive	Kamma Ridge, Port Elizabeth
Walmer Park	Walmer, Port Elizabeth

=== Sarah Baartman Region ===
Shopping centre	Location
Fountains Mall	Jeffreys Bay

=== Transkei ===
Shopping centre	Location
BT Ngebs City Mall	Mthatha
Circus Triangle Mall	Mthatha
Mthatha Plaza	Mthatha
Qumbu Plaza	Qumbu

== Western Cape ==
=== City of Cape Town, incl. Cape Town ===
Shopping centre	Location
3Arts Village	Plumstead
The Arcade	Fish Hoek
Bayside Mall	Table View
Belvedere Square	Claremont
The Birkenhead	Melkbosstrand
Blue Route Mall	Dreyersdal
Bothasig Square	Bothasig
Boulevard Square	Brackenfell
Brackenfell Corner	Brackenfell
Brackenfell Hyper Shopping Centre	Brackenfell
Burgundy Square	Burgundy Estate
Canal Walk	Milnerton
Capegate	Brackenfell
Cape Gate Lifestyle Centre	Brackenfell
Cape Quarter	Green Point
Cavendish Square	Claremont
Centre Point	Milnerton
Century Village	Century City
Circle Centre	Somerset West
Clara Anna Square	Durbanville
Cobble Walk	Durbanville
Constantia Emporium	Constantia
Constantia Village	Constantia
Dean Street Arcade	Newlands
De Ville Centre	Durbanville
Delft Mall	Delft
Durbanville Town Centre	Durbanville
Eden on the Bay	Bloubergstrand
Fairbridge Mall	Brackenfell
Flamingo Square	Table View
Galleria	Sea Point
Gardens Centre	Gardens
GB Mall	Gordon's Bay
Glengarry Shopping Centre	Brackenfell
Golden Acre	Cape Town CBD
Gordon's Bay Village Plaza	Gordon's Bay
Graanendal Shopping Centre	Durbanville
Groot Phesantekraal View	Durbanville
Gugulethu Square	Gugulethu
Haasendal Gables	Brackenfell
Harbour Bay Mall	Simon's Town
Kenilworth Centre	Kenilworth
Khayelitsha Mall	Khayelitsha
Lakeside Centre	Lakeside
Langa Junction	Langa
Liberty Promenade Mall	Mitchells Plain
Lifestyle on Kloof	Cape Town CBD
Longbeach Mall	Noordhoek
Mainstream Mall	Hout Bay
Majik Forest	Bellville
Meadowridge Park n Shop	Meadowridge
Middestad Mall	Bellville
The Muize	Muizenberg
N1 City	Goodwood
Newlands Quarter	Newlands
Okavango Crossing	Kraaifontein
On Darwin	Kraaifontein
Ottery Hyper	Ottery
Paardevlei Sentrum	Somerset West
Paddocks	Milnerton
Parklands Lifestyle Centre	Parklands
Parow Valley	Parow
Pinehurst Centre	Durbanville
Plattekloof Shopping Centre	Plattekloof
Plattekloof Village	Plattekloof
The Point	Sea Point
The Promenade	Camps Bay
Richmond Corner	Richwood
Riverside Mall	Rondebosch
Rondebosch Main	Rondebosch
Sable Square	Milnerton
The Sanctuary	Somerset West
Sandown Retail Crossing	Bloubergstrand
Seaside Village	Bloubergstrand
Silwood Centre	Rondebosch
Simon's Town Boardwalk Centre	Simon's Town
Sitari Village	Somerset West
Somerset Mall	Somerset West
Somerset Square	Somerset West
Soneike Shopping Centre	Kuils River
Southside Shopping Centre	Strand
The Stables	Milnerton
Stadium on Main	Claremont
Steenberg Village	Tokai
Strand Square	Strand
Sulnisa Centre	Bothasig
Sun Valley Mall	Noordhoek
Table Bay Mall	Sunningdale
Table View Shopping Centre	Table View
Tyger Valley Shopping Centre	Bellville
Vangate Mall	Athlone
Vergelegen Plein Shopping Centre	Helderberg Rural
Victoria & Alfred Waterfront (V&A)	Cape Town
Sunningdale Lifestyle Centre	Milnerton
Victoria Mall	Hout Bay
The Village Square	Durbanville
The Village Square	Plumstead
Waterstone Village	Somerset West
Welgemoed Forum	Welgemoed
West Coast Village	Sunningdale
Westgate Mall	Mitchells Plain
Westlake Shopping Centre	Westlake
Willowbridge Shopping Centre	Bellville
Zevenwacht Mall	Kuils River

=== Cape Winelands ===
Shopping centre	Location
Eikestad Mall	Stellenbosch
Mountain Mills	Worcester
Paarl Mall	Paarl
Stellenbosch Square	Stellenbosch

=== Garden Route ===
Shopping centre	Location
Garden Route Mall	George
Garden Walk (to open in September 2025)	Hartenbos
Hartenbos Seefront	Hartenbos
Knysna Mall	Knysna
Langeberg Mall	Mossel Bay
Mosselbaai Mall	Mossel Bay
Thembalethu Square	George

=== West Coast ===
Shopping centre	Location
De Korenvlij	Malmesbury
De Zwartland Markt	Malmesbury

== Gauteng ==
=== East Rand ===
Shopping centre	Location
East Rand Mall	Boksburg
East Point Shopping Centre	Boksburg
Eastgate Shopping Centre	Bedfordview
Festival Mall	Kempton Park
Greenstone Shopping Centre	Edenvale
Lakeside Mall	Benoni
Mall @Carnival	Brakpan
Springs Mall	Springs
Village View Shopping Centre	Bedfordview

=== City of Johannesburg, incl. Johannesburg ===
Shopping centre	Location
Alberton City Shopping Centre	Alberton
Benmore Centre	Benmore Gardens
Bel Air Shopping Centre	Northriding (Randburg)
The Boulders Shopping Centre	Midrand
Cedar Square	Fourways (Sandton)
Chartwell Corner	Fourways (Sandton)
China Mall	Amalgam (Johannesburg)
China Mall West	Roodepoort
China Multiplex	Crown Mines (Johannesburg)
Clearwater Mall	Strubens Valley (Roodepoort)
The Colony Centre	Craighall Park (Sandton)
Cresta Shopping Centre	Cresta (Randburg)
Dobsonville Shopping Centre	Soweto
Eyethu Shopping Centre	Soweto
Fourways Mall	Fourways (Sandton)
The Glen Shopping Centre	Gleneagles (Johannesburg South)
Hyde Park Corner	Hyde Park (Sandton)
Jabulani Mall	Soweto
Mall of Africa	Midrand
Mall of the South	Johannesburg South
Mall @ The Junction	Rosettenville (Johannesburg South)
Maponya Mall	Soweto
Melrose Arch	Melrose (Johannesburg)
Montecasino	Fourways (Sandton)
Nelson Mandela Square	Sandton
Newtown Junction	Newtown (Johannesburg)
North Riding Square	Northriding (Randburg)
Northgate Shopping Centre	Northriding (Randburg)
Rivonia Crossing	Rivonia (Sandton)
Rivonia Square	Rivonia (Sandton)
Rosebank Mall	Rosebank (Johannesburg)
Sandton City	Sandton
Southgate Shopping Centre	Mondeor (Johannesburg)
Southdale Shopping Centre	(Johannesburg South)
Sunninghill Village	Sandton
Trade Route Mall	Lenasia
Westgate Shopping Centre	Horizon View (Roodepoort)
The Zone @ Rosebank	Rosebank (Johannesburg)

=== City of Tshwane incl. Pretoria ===
Shopping centre	Location
Atterbury Boulevard	Faerie Glen, Pretoria
Atterbury Value Mart	Faerie Glen, Pretoria
Barclay Square	Sunnyside, Pretoria
Brooklyn Mall	Brooklyn, Pretoria
Castle Gatr	Erasmuspark, Pretoria
Castle Walk	Erasmuskloof, Pretoria
Centurion Mall	Centurion
Design Square	Brooklyn, Pretoria
Elardus Park Shopping Centre	Elardus Park, Pretoria
Forest Hill City	Centurion
Garsfontein Shopping Centre	Garsfontein, Pretoria
Gezina Galleries	Gezina, Pretoria
Gift Acres Convenience Centre	Lynnwood Ridge, Pretoria
Glenfair Shopping Centre	Lynnwood Manor, Pretoria
Grey Owl Village	Centurion
Groenkloof Shopping Centre	Groenkloof, Pretoria
The Grove Mall	Equestria, Pretoria
Hatfield Plaza	Hatfield, Pretoria
Irene Village Mall	Irene, Centurion
Jakaranda Centre	Rietfontein, Pretoria
Jubilee Mall	Hammanskraal
Karenpark Crossing	Akasia
Kolonnade Retail Park	Montana Park, Pretoria
Kolonnade Shopping Centre	Montana Park, Pretoria
Linton's Corner	Silverlakes, Pretoria
Lynridge Mall	Lynnwood Ridge, Pretoria
Mall @ Reds	Rooihuiskraal North, Centurion
Mams Mall	Mamelodi, Pretoria
Menlyn Maine	Menlo Park, Pretoria
Menlyn Park	Menlo Park, Pretoria
Menlyn Retail Park	Menlo Park, Pretoria
Montana Crossing	Montana, Pretoria
Moreleta Plaza Shopping Centre	Moreleta Park, Pretoria
Northpark Mall	Pretoria North, Pretoria
Parkview Shopping Centre	Moreleta Park, Pretoria
Quagga Centre	Pretoria West, Pretoria
Sancardia Shopping Centre	Arcadia, Pretoria
Silver Oaks Crossing	Willow Acres, Pretoria
Sinoville Centre	Sinoville, Pretoria
Soshanguve Crossing	Soshanguve
Southdowns Shopping Centre	Centurion
Square Shopping Centre	Moreleta Park, Pretoria
Station Square	Pretoria CBD
Sunnypark Convenience	Pretoria CBD
Thatchfield Retail Centre	Thatchfield
Tshwane Regional	Mamelodi, Pretoria
Waverly Plaza	Waverly, Pretoria
Wonderboom Junction	Annlin West, Pretoria
Wonderpark Shopping Centre	Karenpark, Akasia
Woodlands Boulevard	Pretoria East, Pretoria
Zambezi Junction	Montana Park, Pretoria

=== West Rand ===
Shopping centre	Location
Cradlestone Mall	Krugersdorp
Kagiso Mall	Krugersdorp
Key West Shopping Centre	Krugersdorp
Kwena Square	Little Falls

Carletonville Mall Carletonville

Westgate Mall

== Mpumalanga ==
Shopping centre	Location
Acornhoek Plaza	Acornhoek
Bushbuckridge Complex	Bushbuckridge
Downtown Mall	eMalahleni
Ermelo Mall	Ermelo, Mpumalanga
Guliwe Shopping Centre	Kriel, Mpumalanga
The Heads Shopping Centre	Mashishing
Highveld Mall	eMalahleni
Kriel Mall	Kriel, Mpumalanga
Mall @ Emba Shopping Centre	Embalenhle
Mall @ Mfula Shopping Centre	Piet Retief
Middelburg Mall	Middelburg
Mphemo Shopping Centre	Hendrina
Nkwinika shopping mall	Matsikitsane
Noel Mahlauli shopping centre	Middelburg
Oaks Shopping Centre	Ermelo
Riverview Centre	eMalahleni
Secunda Mall	Secunda, Mpumalanga
Thembisa Shopping Complex	Ermelo
Tonga Mall	Tonga, Mpumalanga
Twin City	Bushbuckridge
Woodhill Shopping Centre	Piet Retief

=== City of Mbombela ===
Shopping centre	Location
The Crossing Shopping Centre	Mbombela
Emoyeni Mall	KaNyamazane
The Grove Riverside Shopping Centre	Riverside, Mbombela
i'Langa Mall	West Acres, Mbombela
Lowveld Mall	Hazyview
Orchard Shopping Centre	Mbombela
Riverside Mall	Riverside, Mbombela
The Square	Mbombela
Valley Hyper	Mbombela
White River Square	White River

== Free State ==
=== Mangaung incl. Bloemfontein ===
Shopping centre	Location
Bloem Plaza	CBD
Bloemgate Centre	Brandwag
Boitumelo Junction	Thabong
Brandwag Centre	Brandwag
Central Park Mall	CBD
Dan Pienaar Mall	Dan Pienaar
Dihlabeng Shopping Centre	Bethlehem
Fleurdal Mall	Fleurdal
Goldfields Mall	Welkom
Lemo Mall	Heidedal
Loch Logan Waterfront mall	Willows
Maokeng Mall	Maokeng
Middestad Mall	CBD
Mimosa Mall	Brandwag
Northridge Mall	Helicon heights
The Towers Shopping Centre	Langenhoven Park
Twin City Mall	Heidedal
Westdene Arcade	Westdene

== Limpopo ==
=== Polokwane ===
Shopping centre	Location
Limpopo Mall	CBD
Mall of the North	Bendor
Palm Centre	CBD
Savannah Mall	Fauna Park
Thornhill Shopping Centre	Thornhill

=== Mopane ===
Shopping centre	Location
Masingita Mall	Giyani
Thavhani Mall	Thohoyandou
Tzaneng Mall	Tzaneen
Elim Mall	Elim

=== Burgersfort ===
Shopping centre	Location
Burgersfort Mall	CBD
Groblersdal Mall	Groblersdal
Morone Shopping Centre	Burgersfort
Tubatse Crossing Regional Mall	Burgersfort
Twin City Centre	CBD

== Northern Cape ==
Shopping centre	Location
The Ant Walk Shopping Centre	Kimberley
Diamond Pavilion Mall	Kimberley, Northern Cape
Douglas Sentrum	Douglas, Northern Cape
Heritage Mall Kathu	Kathu
Kalahari Mall	Upington
Kathu Centre	Kathu
Kathu Village Mall	Kathu
Kimberley Sanlam Centre	Kimberley
Kuruman Mall	Kuruman
Limeacres Shopping Centre	Lime Acres
Mokala Mall	Kuruman
New Park Centre	Kimberley
North Cape Mall	Kimberley
Siyathemba Shopping Centre	Kathu
Springbok Plaza	Springbok, Northern Cape

== KwaZulu-Natal ==
=== Drakensberg ===
Shopping centre	Location
Kokstad Regional Centre	Kokstad
Rosewood Square	Kokstad

=== eThekwini incl. Durban ===
Shopping centre	Location
Arbour Crossing	Amanzimtoti
The Atrium	Overport, Durban
Berea Centre	Berea, Durban
Bluff Towers	Bluff, Durban
Bridge City Shopping Centre	KwaMashu
City View Shopping Centre	Greyville, Durban
Chatsworth Centre	Chatsworth
China Mall Durban	South Beach, Durban
Cornubia Mall	Cornubia, Mount Edgecombe
Cotswold Square	Hillcrest
The Crescent at Umhlanga Ridge	uMhlanga
Danish Centre	Gillitts
Davenport Square	Glenwood, Durban
Delcairn Lifestyle Centre	Kloof
Galleria Mall	Amanzimtoti
Gateway Theatre of Shopping	uMhlanga Ridge
Gillitts Shopping Centre	Gillitts
Glenwood Village	Glenwood, Durban
Hammarsdale Junction	Mpumalanga
Hillcrest Corner	Hillcrest
Hillside Mall	Bluff, Durban
Kingsburgh Centre	Winklespruit, Kingsburgh
Kingsburgh Junction	Doonside, Kingsburgh
Kloof Village Mall	Kloof
KwaMnyandu Mall	Umlazi
La Lucia Mall	La Lucia, uMhlanga
Malvern Park	Queensburgh
Marine Walk	Sibaya Coastal City, eMdloti
Mount Edgecombe Plaza	Mount Edgecombe
Musgrave Centre	Musgrave, Durban
Oceans Mall	uMhlanga
oThongathi Mall	oThongathi
Outlet Park	uMhlanga
The Pavilion	Westville
The Pearls Mall	uMhlanga
Philani Valley Shopping Centre	Umlazi
Phoenix Plaza	Phoenix
Pine Crest Centre	Pinetown
Seadoone Mall	Amanzimtoti
Toti Towers	Amanzimtoti
Umlazi Mega City	Umlazi
Watercrest Mall	Waterfall
Westown Square	Westown, Shongweni, near Hillcrest
Westville Mall	Westville
Westwood Mall	Westville
Windermere Centre	Windermere, Durban
The Workshop	Durban Central

=== Newcastle ===
Shopping centre	Location
Amajuba Mall	Hutten Heights
City Central	Newcastle CBD
Factory Plaza	Newcastle CBD
Ithala Centre	Madadeni
Itheku Plaza	Osizweni
Meadowlands Crossing	Madadeni
Newcastle Mall	Equarand
Osizweni Central	Osizweni
Scott Street Mall	Newcastle CBD
Taxi City	Newcastle CBD
ValueCity	Newcastle CBD
Victorian Mall	Newcastle CBD
Village Walk	Newcastle CBD
Eyethu Junction	Madadeni

=== Pietermaritzburg & Midlands ===
Shopping centre	Location
Athlone Circle Mall	Athlone, Pietermaritzburg
The Avenues Shopping Centre	Hilton
Brookside Mall	Pietermaritzburg CBD
Capital Centre	Pietermaritzburg CBD
Cascades Lifestyle Centre	Chase Valley Downs, Pietermaritzburg
Edendale Crossing Shopping Centre	Edendale
Greater Edendale Mall	Edendale
Hayfields Mall	Hayfields, Pietermaritzburg
Hilton Siding Shopping Centre	Hilton
Kwamabulala Shopping Centre	Dambuza, Edendale
Liberty Midlands Mall	Chase Valley, Pietermaritzburg
The Mall at Scottsville	Scottsville, Pietermaritzburg
Northway Mall	Woodlands, Pietermaritzburg
Parklane Shopping Centre	Pietermaritzburg CBD
The Quarry Centre	Hilton
Selgro Centre	Pietermaritzburg CBD
Victoria Square	Pietermaritzburg CBD
Woodburn Shopping Centre	Scottsville, Pietermaritzburg

=== North Coast ===
Shopping centre	Location
Ballito Junction	Ballito
Ballito Lifestyle Centre	Ballito
KwaDukuza Mall	KwaDukuza
New Salt Rock City	Salt Rock
Zimbali Square (TBC)	Ballito

=== South Coast ===
Shopping centre	Location
Emoyeni Centre	Margate
Hibiscus Mall	Margate
Margate Mall	Margate
Oribi Plaza	Port Shepstone
Port Shepstone Mall	Port Shepstone
Scottburgh Mall	Scottburgh
Shelly Centre	Shelly Beach
Southcoast Mall	Shelly Beach

=== Zululand ===
Shopping centre	Location
Boardwalk Inkwazi	Richards Bay
Checkers Centre	Richards Bay
Princess Mkabayi Mall	Vryheid
