= M8 (Durban) =

Metropolitan route in eThekwini, South Africa

Metropolitan route M8

Route information
- Maintained by eThekwini Metropolitan Municipality

Major junctions
- North end: M17 in Essenwood
- M15 John Zikhali Road in Essenwood; M13 King Dinuzulu Road North/South in Musgrave
- South end: M32 in Glenwood

Location
- Country: South Africa
- Towns: Durban

Highway system
- Numbered routes of South Africa
← M7	→ M9

The M8 is a metropolitan route in the eThekwini Metropolitan Municipality in South Africa, connecting Essenwood (north-west of the Durban CBD) with Glenwood (south-west of the Durban CBD), both of which form part of the Berea suburban belt.

== Route ==
The M8 begins at the intersection with the M17 (Sandile Thusi Road) on the boundary between Essenwood and Windermere. It heads south as Problem Mkhize Road through Essenwood, intersecting the M15 (John Zikhali Road) at the southern boundary of Essenwood with Musgrave.

Continuing into Musgrave, it borders the Durban Botanic Gardens as Edith Benson Crescent before intersecting St Thomas Road, where it becomes Botanic Gardens Road. At the southern boundary of Musgrave, it intersects the M13 (King Dinuzulu Road North; Chris Ntuli Road) before flying over the N3. It then intersects the M13 (King Dinuzulu Road South), entering Bulwer as Cleaver Road and heading southwest.

After intersecting Clark Road, it becomes Bulwer Road, continuing through Bulwer. At the Alan Paton Road intersection, it marks the southern boundary of Bulwer with Glenwood. Entering Glenwood, it becomes ZK Matthews Road at Rhodes Avenue and Frere Crescent, continuing south through Glenwood. It ends at the intersection with the M32 (Rick Turner Road) on the southern boundary of Glenwood with Umbilo.
