= Rivonia (disambiguation) =

Rivonia is a township in South Africa.

Rivonia can also refer to:

- Rivonia Trial, where Nelson Mandela was jailed
- Rivonia Square
- Rivonia (song)
