= Essenwood, Durban =

Essenwood
- Suburb
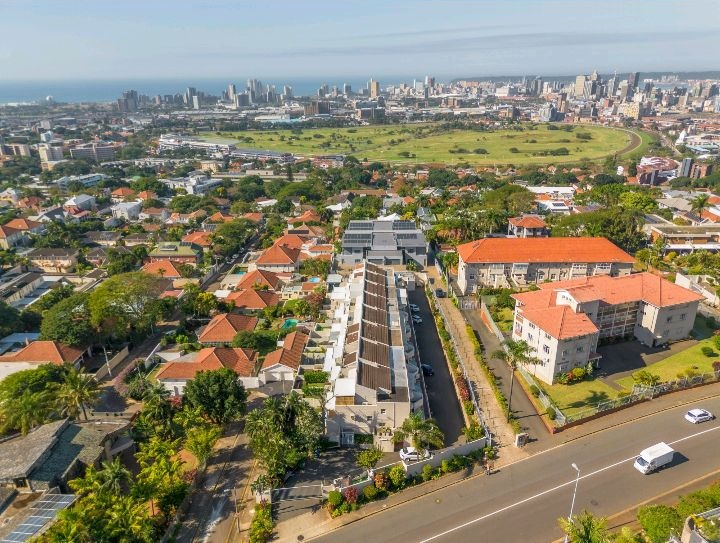

- Location within KwaZulu-Natal Location within South Africa
- Coordinates: 29.8358°S 31.0067°E
- Country: South Africa
- Province: KwaZulu-Natal
- Municipality: eThekwini
- Main Place: Durban

Area
  - Total: 2.06 km^{2} (0.80 sq mi)

Population (2011)
  - Total: 11,318
  - Density: 5,490/km^{2} (14,200/sq mi)

Racial makeup (2011)
  - White: 38.3%
  - Indian/Asian: 34.3%
  - Black African: 22.7%
  - Coloured: 3.7%
  - Other: 1.1%

First languages (2011)
  - English: 77.5%
  - Zulu: 11.1%
  - Afrikaans: 3.6%
  - Xhosa: 2.6%
  - Other: 5.2%
- Time zone: UTC+2 (SAST)
- Postal code (street): 4001
- PO box: n/a
- Area code: 031

Essenwood is a central suburb of Durban, KwaZulu-Natal, South Africa, approximately 3 kilometres (1.9 mi) north-west of the city centre. It is administered by the eThekwini Metropolitan Municipality, the municipality governing Durban and its surrounding suburbs.

== Politics ==
Essenwood is classed under Ward 27 in terms of IEC's demarcation which includes Essenwood, Morningside, Windermere and Stamford Hill.

The elected Councillor for this ward is Ernest Smith who represents the ward in the eThekwini Council & was elected in 2019 replacing former Councillor (now MPL) Martin Meyer who was elected to serve in the KwaZulu-Natal Provincial Legislature on behalf of the Democratic Alliance.

== Geography ==
Essenwood borders on Windermere to the north, Morningside to the north-west, Greyville to the east, Musgrave to the south, and Sydenham to the west.

== Safety ==
Most of Essenwood is covered by the policing precinct of Berea SAPS (located in Musgrave). A small section of the suburb, west of East Street/Silver Oak Avenue is covered by Mayville SAPS (situated 2 km to the south-west).

== Transport ==
=== Roads ===
The two main roads intersecting Essenwood include the M8 to the east and the M17 to the north. The M8 (Problem Mkhize Road) connects Essenwood with Musgrave and Glenwood to the south. The M17 (Sandile Thusi Road; Springfield Road) connects Stamford Hill and Windermere to the east with Springfield to the west.
