= M7 (Durban) =

Metropolitan route in eThekwini, South Africa

Metropolitan route M7

Route information
- Maintained by the eThekwini Metropolitan Municipality
- Length: 22 km (14 mi)

Major junctions
- West end: M13 / M19 in Pinetown
- N3 in Pinetown; N2 in Queensburgh; M10 in Bellair; R102 in Rossburgh; M4 in Rossburgh; M16 in Wentworth
- East end: Marine Drive in Bluff

Location
- Country: South Africa
- Towns: Pinetown, Queensburgh, Durban

Highway system
- Numbered routes of South Africa
← M5	→ M8

The M7 is a metropolitan route in the eThekwini Metropolitan Municipality, South Africa, connecting Pinetown to Brighton Beach in the Bluff, Durban.

== Route ==
The M7 begins at the M13 off-ramp intersection with the M19 in Pinetown and follows a route south as a dual-carriage highway named Solomon Mahlangu Drive (previously Edwin Swales VC Drive).

Shortly after, it meets the N3 highway (to Pietermaritzburg) at an interchange and proceeds south-east as a dual-carriage highway. After the M34 Moseley Park off-ramp, the M7 leaves Pinetown and enters Queensburgh, winding through the town. It then turns eastwards at the Bellville Road off-ramp before entering Durban and ending as a dual-carriage highway east of Queensburgh at the intersection with the N2 highway (to KwaDukuza and Port Shepstone).

It continues eastwards as Solomon Mahlangu Drive but as a dual-carriage roadway and then south-eastwards through Carrington Heights, Sea View and Rossburgh. At Rossburgh, it meets the R102 at an interchange and co-signs with the R102 for less than a kilometre and immediately afterwards meets the M4 highway.

After the M4, it goes through Clairwood before intersecting with the M16. At the M16 intersection it turns left into Bluff Road and immediately turns right into Old Mission Road in a south-east direction again. It changes its name to Gray Inn Road in Wentworth before ending at the intersection with Marine Drive in Brighton Beach.

== Junctions ==
Municipality	Location	km	mi	Exit	Destinations	Notes
eThekwini	Bluff	0	0	—	Marine Drive, Strand Road, Brighton Beach	At-grade intersection
eThekwini	Bluff	2.6	1.6	—	M16 Bluff Road north, Grosvenor	At-grade intersection; Eastern end of concurrency with M16
eThekwini	Bluff	2.9	1.8	—	M16 Bluff Road south, Wentworth	At-grade intersection; Western end of concurrency with M16
eThekwini	Clairwood	5.0	3.1	(4)	M4 Inkosi Albert Luthuli Highway, Durban Central, Umlazi	
eThekwini	Clairwood	5.2	3.2	—	R102 South Coast Road south, Mobeni	At-grade intersection; Eastern end of concurrency with R102
eThekwini	Umbilo	5.8	3.6	—	R102 Umbilo Road north, Umbilo	At-grade intersection; Western end of concurrency with R102
eThekwini	Bellair	8.6	5.3	—	M10 Wakesleigh Road, Vuzi Mzimela Road, Bellair, Cato Manor	At-grade intersection
eThekwini	Bellair	9.8	6.1	(161)	N2 Durban Outer Ring Road, KwaDukuza, Port Shepstone	
eThekwini	Queensburgh	12.2	7.6	7	Bellville Road, Malvern, Queensburgh	
eThekwini	Pinetown	16.7	10.4	12	M5 Main Road, Moseley, Northdene	
eThekwini	Pinetown	18.7	11.6	14	M34 Hans Dettman Highway, Moseley Park, Shallcross	
eThekwini	Pinetown	20.8	12.9	(20)	N3 west, Pietermaritzburg	
eThekwini	Pinetown	21.5	13.4	—	Winston Churchill Drive	
eThekwini	Pinetown	22.4	13.9	(17)	M13 King Cetshwayo Highway, Kloof, Westville, M19 St. John's Avenue, Pinetown	
M7 ends, roadway continues as the M19
