= Stamford Hill (disambiguation) =

Stamford Hill may refer to:

- Stamford Hill, an area in north-east London Borough of Hackney.
- Stamford Hill, a hill near Stratton, Cornwall, the scene of battle of the English Civil War in 1643, often called the Battle of Stamford Hill.
- Stamford Hill, Durban, in South Africa.
