= Roscius =

Roscius may refer to:

== People ==
- Lucius Roscius (5th century BC), murdered Roman envoy
- Marcus Roscius Coelius (1st century BC), Roman military officer
- Quintus Roscius Gallus (ca. 126 BC – 62 BC), famous Roman actor
  - William Henry West Betty (1791–1874), actor known as the "Young Roscius"
  - Ira Aldridge (1807–1867), actor known as the "African Roscius"
- Sextus Roscius (1st century BC), Roman farmer accused of parricide and successfully defended by Cicero

== Other uses ==
- Roscius (bug), a genus of true bugs in the family Pyrrhocoridae
