= Asherville =

Asherville may refer to:

- Asherville, Indiana, an unincorporated community
- Asherville, Kansas, an unincorporated community
- Asherville, Missouri, an unincorporated community
- Asherville, Durban, a residential area in Durban, South Africa
