= Elton Hill =

- Location within Gauteng Location within South Africa
- Coordinates: 26.124°S 28.068°E
- Country: South Africa
- Province: Gauteng
- Municipality: City of Johannesburg
- Established: 1949

Area
  - Total: 0.22 km^{2} (0.085 sq mi)

Population (2001)
  - Total: 409
  - Density: 1,900/km^{2} (4,800/sq mi)
- Time zone: UTC+2 (SAST)

Elton Hill is a suburb of Johannesburg, South Africa. It is a small suburb tucked between Athol and Melrose. It is located in Region E of the City of Johannesburg Metropolitan Municipality.

== History ==
Prior to the discovery of gold on the Witwatersrand in 1886, the suburb lay on land on one of the original farms called Syferfontein. It became a suburbs on 1 June 1949, developed by John Ellis Crofton and the suburb name is based on his middle and last names.
