= Klaarwater =

Klaarwater may refer to

- Klaarwater in Griqualand West, a former name of the town of Griekwastad, Northern Cape, South Africa
- Klaarwater, a suburb of Durban in KwaZulu-Natal, South Africa
- History

Klaarwater is a township established near Pinetown, adjacent to Chatsworth, Savanna Park and St Wendolins Mission in the Marianhill area. During apartheid, it was designated for Black African residents under the Blacks (Urban Areas) Consolidation Act.

Tenure and the KLARA organisation In the early 1980s, residents of Klaarwater faced threats of removal and rental increases imposed by the Port Natal Administration Board. In response, the Klaarwater Residents’ Association (KLARA) was formed on 28 October 1982 at the Lutheran Church, Ngcobo Street. The chairman was Michael MABASO, who later qualified as a lawyer and practised as an Associate at Mapipman Mabaso & Associates, an estates administration firm in Pinetown.

On 10 July 1983, KLARA submitted a memorandum to the Port Natal Administration Board opposing rent increases and requesting the institution of a 99-year leasehold system under Section 6A of the Blacks (Urban Areas) Consolidation Act No. 25 of 1945. The memorandum, led by Mabaso, cited grievances including inadequate sanitation, lack of piped water and electricity to homes, and dilapidated housing. KLARA argued that home-ownership would give residents a stake in maintaining their own properties.

In August 1985, Roger Burrows, Member of Parliament for Pinetown, intervened on behalf of approximately 250 Klaarwater residents who had met with him. In correspondence to Minister J.C. Heunis, Burrows advocated for freehold tenure in Klaarwater, or at minimum the granting of 99-year leasehold. He noted that the township was already surrounded by Indian and Coloured townships that enjoyed freehold rights, and that Klaarwater residents sought similar security.

The legal and civic activities of KLARA, under Mabaso’s leadership, prevented the removal of Klaarwater residents during the 1980s. As of 2026, many households in Klaarwater continue to occupy their homes without formal title deeds, as the 99-year leases requested in 1983 were never formally granted.
