= Morningside, Durban =

Morningside
- Suburb
- Skyline of Morningside

- Location within KwaZulu-Natal Location within South Africa
- Coordinates: 29.822°S 31.017°E
- Country: South Africa
- Province: KwaZulu-Natal
- Municipality: eThekwini

Government

Area
  - Total: 3.24 km^{2} (1.25 sq mi)

Population (2001)
  - Total: 13,074
  - Density: 4,040/km^{2} (10,500/sq mi)

Racial makeup (2001)
  - Black African: 15.1%
  - Coloured: 4.2%
  - Indian/Asian: 25.5%
  - White: 55.2%

First languages (2001)
  - English: 82.35%
  - Zulu: 11.0%
  - Afrikaans: 2.6%
  - Xhosa: 1.9%
  - Other: 1.3%
- Time zone: UTC+2 (SAST)
- Postal code (street): 4001
- PO box: n/a

Morningside is an affluent suburb of Durban, KwaZulu-Natal, South Africa. It is nestled on an elevated ridge overlooking the City of Durban.

== Location ==
The suburb is a high income area of Durban located about 2 kilometres (1.2 mi) inland from the Indian Ocean coast, on the south bank of the Umgeni River. Its neighboring suburbs are Puntans Hill to the west, Essenwood to the south-west, Windermere to the south and Stamford Hill to the east.

== Politics ==
Morningside is classed under Ward 27 in terms of IEC's demarcation which includes Essenwood, Windermere and Stamford Hill.

The current Ward Councillor, Ernest Smith was elected in a by-Election August 2019 & again in 2021. This followed the resignation of Martin Meyer who took up a role in the KwaZulu-Natal Legislature & subsequently became the MEC of Public Works in the Province.

With the municipal Elections in November 2026, the ward candidate for the Democratic Alliance is Ryan Hendra who will be taking over from Councillor Ernest Smith.

== Layout and attractions ==
The Morningside area contains classical examples of large Edwardian and Victorian style homes with tin roofs and wide verandas, including the State President's residence (when at home). Around Florida Road in the suburb's southwest is a nightlife area consisting of shops, restaurants, pubs and bistros. It is the closest residential suburb to the Moses Mabhida Stadium (in Stamford Hill), which was completed in 2009 on the grounds of the Kings Park Sports Ground.

== Facilities ==
=== Parks and gardens ===
- Burman Bush
  - Baden Powell Scouts Site
  - Helen Gibling Gardens
  - Westgate Gardens
- Jameson Park and Rose Garden
- Mitchell Park
- Windsor Park

=== Other ===
- Florida Road Post Office
- Library (adjacent to Kenmore Primary School)
- Motor Licensing Office
- Morningside Sports Club
- Berea Police Station
- Innes Road Jamaat Khaana

=== Consulates ===
- Belgium
- Chile
- Madagascar
- Portuguese
- Thailand

=== Churches ===
- Lambert Road Baptist Church
- Morningside Community Church (MCC- Rev. Dr. Gabriel J Benjiman)

== Notable people ==
  - Stephen Saad – Billionaire businessman, founder and CEO of Aspen Pharmacare
  - Gus Attridge – Deputy CEO and co-founder of Aspen Pharmacare

== Safety ==
Morningside is divided over two SAPS precincts. The section west of Peter Mokaba Road is covered by Mayville SAPS while the section east of Peter Mokaba Road is covered by Berea SAPS (located in Musgrave).

== Sources ==
- MapStudio (2005). Street Guide - Durban (8th ed.). p. Map 56. ISBN 1-86809-739-0.
