= Musgrave, Durban =

Musgrave
- Suburb
- Location within KwaZulu-Natal Location within South Africa
- Coordinates: 29°50′46″S 30°59′55″E
- Country: South Africa
- Province: KwaZulu-Natal
- Municipality: eThekwini
- Main Place: Durban

Racial makeup (2001)

First languages (2001)
- Time zone: UTC+2 (SAST)
- Postal code (street): 4001
- PO box: 4062
- Area code: 031

Musgrave is a central suburb of Durban, South Africa. It is situated inland and north-west of the Durban CBD, and forms part of the suburban belt known as the Berea.

== Geography ==
Musgrave borders on Essenwood to the north, Greyville to the east, Bulwer to the south, and Overport to the west.

== Retail ==
Musgrave Centre, a large shopping centre is found in the area, situated along Musgrave Road. Completed in the late 1950s, Musgrave Centre was the first suburban shopping centre in Durban and has undergone a number of revamps over the years, including a R140 million revamp in 2010 and the most recent multi-million revamp in 2024. In 2021, anchor stores, Food Lover’s Market and Dis-Chem were added to the shopping centre’s offerings.

In 2023, SACREF installed the first padel courts in KwaZulu-Natal at the rooftop of the mall. The 2024 revamp focused on the fourth level of the centre, where the cinema space previously occupied by Ster-Kinekor has been replaced with a “Checkers Emporium” which features a high-end Checkers Fresh X, Checkers Pet and Checkers Liquor.

== Transport ==
=== Roads ===
Musgrave lies north of the N3 (Western Freeway), connecting Durban CBD to the south-east with Pietermaritzburg to the north-west. The suburb can also be accessed from the N3 freeway via King Dinuzulu Road at exit 3.

Other key arterial routes include:

- M8 (Edith Benson Crescent; Botanic Gardens Road) – connects Essenwood (north) with Bulwer and Glenwood (south).
- M13 (King Dinuzulu Road North and South) – connects Durban CBD (south-east) with Sherwood and Westville (north-west).
- Peter Mokaba Ridge – connects Essenwood with Bulwer and Glenwood.

== Recreation ==
Musgrave is home to the Durban Botanic Gardens, located on the eastern boundary with Greyville, near the Greyville Racecourse. Covering an area of 15 hectares (37 acres), it is oldest public institution in Durban and the oldest surviving botanical gardens in Africa.

== Safety ==
Berea Police Station is located on Botanic Gardens Road towards the east of Musgrave. The SAPS policing precinct of the Berea covers the northern section of the Berea including Musgrave, Windermere, Essenwood and Morningside.
