= Lambert Road Baptist Church =

- The church logo
- Lambert Road Baptist Church
- 29°49′40″S 31°01′06″E
- Location: Morningside, Durban, KwaZulu-Natal
- Country: South Africa
- Denomination: Baptist
- Website: lambertroadbaptist.co.za

History
- Founded: 1904

The Lambert Road Baptist Church is a Baptist church located in the suburb of Morningside, in Durban, South Africa. This church is a member of the Baptist Union of Southern Africa.

== History ==
Lambert Road Baptist Church was planted in Durban in 1904 by the Durban Central (West Street) and Bulwer Road Baptist Churches to minister to "the Stamford Hill area", what is today the suburb of Morningside. During the 1950s and 1960s the church had an all age Sunday school of 200, and a significant young adult ministry.

== Pastors ==
The following pastors have served at Lambert Road Baptist Church since establishment:

Ordinal	Name	Term began	Term ended
1	Richard Raine Miller	1904	1906
2	Dr Alfred Hall	1906	1909
3	Thomas Aitken	1910	1913
4	George William Cross	1913	1918
5	Arthur Henry Chapman	1918	1922
6	Henry James Batts	1922	1926
7	Robert Fortune Lindsay	1927	1943
8	Kenneth Richardson	1943	1945
9	Llewelyn Glyndwr Tudor	1946	1954
10	Prof John Norman Jonsson	1954	1960
11	Cedric Winter	1961	1971
12	Robert Jardine Baston	1972	1993
13	Stephen McKibbin	1994	1998
14	Dr Terence Barton McGee	1999	2004
15	Patrick Haynes	2006	2007
16	Gareth Simpson	2008	2011
17	Stuart Cranna	2011	incumbent
