= Kenneth Stainbank Nature Reserve =

Protected area in the suburb of Yellowwood Park, Durban, South Africa

- Location within KwaZulu-Natal
- Location: Durban, South Africa
- Coordinates: 29°54′26″S 30°56′03″E
- Area: 253 ha (630 acres)
- Established: 1963
- Governing body: Ezemvelo KZN Wildlife
- Website: www.kznwildlife.com/kenneth-stainbank.html

Kenneth Stainbank Nature Reserve is a 253 hectare protected area in the suburb of Yellowwood Park, Durban, South Africa. The park was proclaimed in 1963, after land was donated by Mr Kenneth Stainbank for its purpose. The reserve is managed by Ezemvelo KZN Wildlife.

== Flora and fauna ==
The park contains many real yellowwood trees, for which the surrounding suburb is named. The park has coastal forest and natural grassland which is habitat to the following animals:

- banded mongoose
- blue, red and grey duiker
- bushbaby
- bushbuck
- Egyptian mongoose
- genet
- impala
- reedbuck
- rock hyrax
- slender mongoose
- vervet monkey
- water monitor
- zebra

== Facilities and trails ==
There are 13 km of nature walks, as well as a 10 km mountain bike trail in the park. Recently three well marked walking trails have been added: a 5 km, family-friendly route; a moderate trail; and a more challenging 10 km route. There is also a wheelchair-friendly trail in the reserve, accessible from the main car park.

Within the reserve, surrounded by giant yellowwood trees, is a hidden treasure: Coedmore Castle. This is a gracious old stone homestead that was built by Dering Stainbank in 1885. Coedmore Castle still contains many of the original household contents including furniture from the nineteenth century, old family portraits and antique silverware. Coedmore Castle was maintained by members of the original family until 2018 when Elizabeth Keith, Kenneth's daughter, died. At this time so did the family usufruct and the building and surrounding property in terms of the deed of donation now vests in the state. As a consequence, the castle is no longer open to the public for guided tours and school outings. Likewise, the grounds are no longer available for hire.

Also in the reserve is the Mary Stainbank Memorial Gallery. Mary was a contemporary of Henry Moore, having graduated from the Royal College of Art, London, in 1925. The gallery contains a large body of her private works and papers and is open to the public by prior booking.

The reserve is also home to the Wilderness Leadership Foundation, founded by the late Ian Player. The school takes groups on guided walks through the province's northern game reserves, mainly Hluhluwe-Imfolozi.
