= Burman Bush =

Nature reserve in Durban, South Africa

Coordinates: 29°49′03″S 31°01′01″E

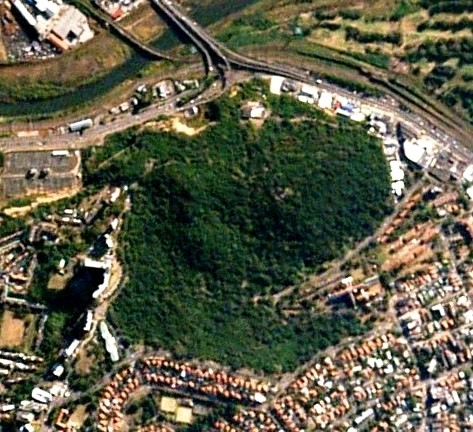
An aerial view of the 50 ha Burman Bush Nature Reserve in northern Morningside, Durban

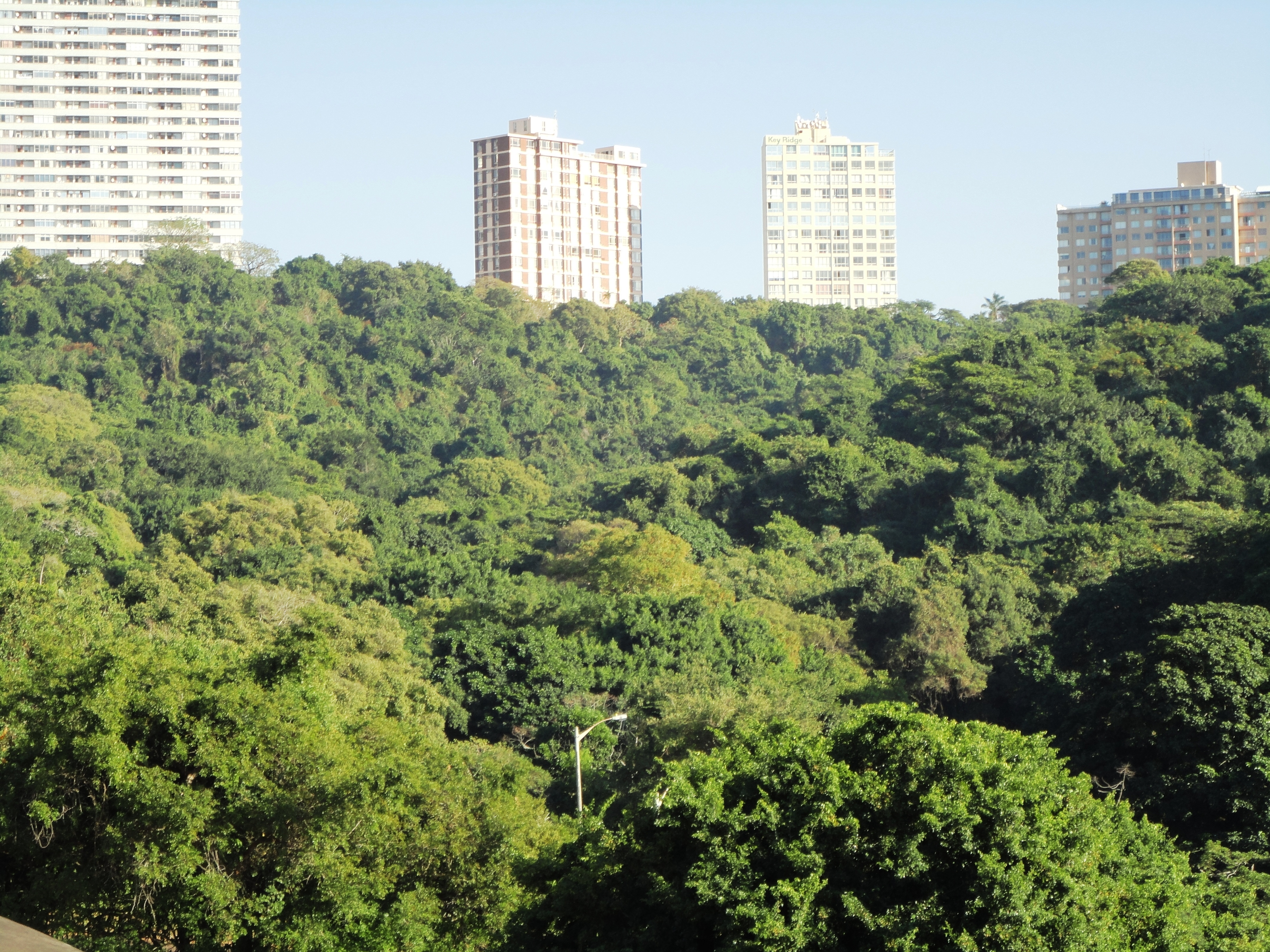
A westward view over Burman Bush and the residential buildings beyond it

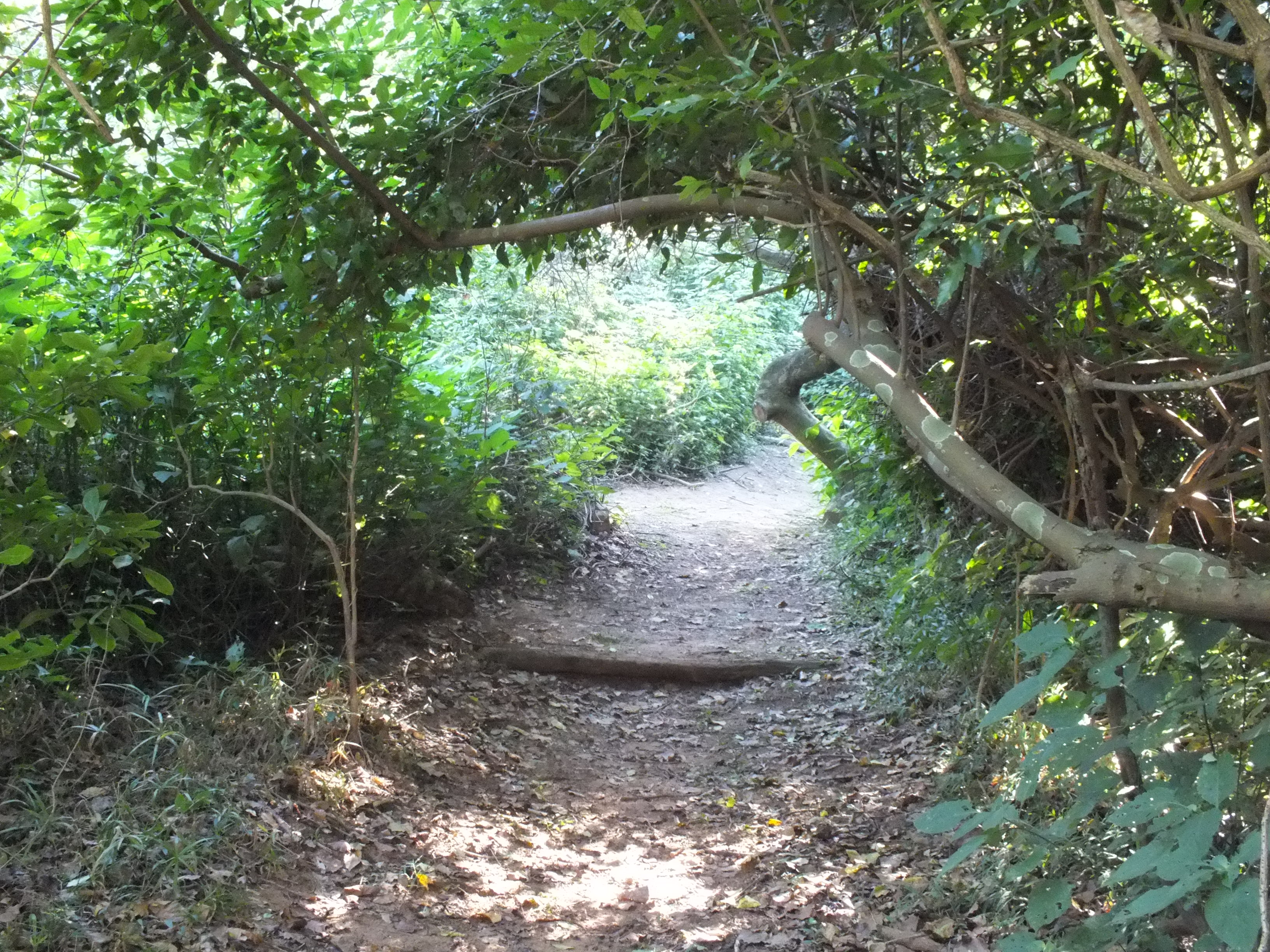
A Burman Bush walking trail

Burman Bush is a nature reserve in Morningside, Durban, situated some 8 km north of the CBD. At about 50 hectares it constitutes a small circular enclave of coastal forest which forms part of the Durban Municipal Open Space System (D'MOSS). It is the northern remnant of a forest that once covered much of the Berea ridge. The reserve's elevation varies from 19 to 133 m a.s.l.

== Trails ==
It contains three walking trails, the Pithi (500 m), Hadedah (1 km) and Forest olive (2 km) walks, that wind through the forest and allow visitors to see the various flora and fauna. A viewing platform at the outer walk's northern extremity allows sweeping views of the Umgeni River, from Connaught bridge to the Blue lagoon.

== Fauna and flora ==
Reclusive species constitute much of the fauna. The reserve has Durban's largest population of blue duiker, besides grey duiker, banded and slender mongoose, porcupines and troops of vervet monkeys. Its birdlife, most evident during the early hours, may be best viewed from the central private road. It includes tambourine doves, green wood hoopoes, fork-tailed and common square-tailed drongos, spotted ground thrushes (in winter), red-capped robin-chats, yellow-bellied greenbuls, yellow-breasted apalises, ashy and paradise flycatchers, grey sunbirds and southern tchagras. Among the forest trees that populate the reserve are the flat-crown, forest fever-berry, forest olive and red beech. Buckweed covers much of the forest floor.

== Safety ==
Muggings were reported c.2013 and in 2018, and the ward councilor highlighted the need for repair of breaches in the reserve's fencing. Inspections of the reserve's fencing has started as of mid August 2018 by staff at the reserve as well as the ward councilor himself. Members of the South African Police Services including the local K9 unit have been given access keys to make random patrols on the roads in the reserve and have made an arrest in August 2018 as a result of increased Police activity in the area.

On the afternoon of 31 August 2018 Simon Milliken, former Principal Double Bassist for the KwaZulu-Natal Philharmonic Orchestra, was stabbed while birdwatching with Perry So in the reserve. He died from his injuries overnight, and his body was found by a walker in the reserve the following day. The search by the South African Police Service was allegedly delayed.

This latest incident, which occurred a day after two walkers were robbed at gunpoint in the reserve, has led to calls by the ward councilor and local civic groups for the reserve to be temporarily closed.

== Gallery ==
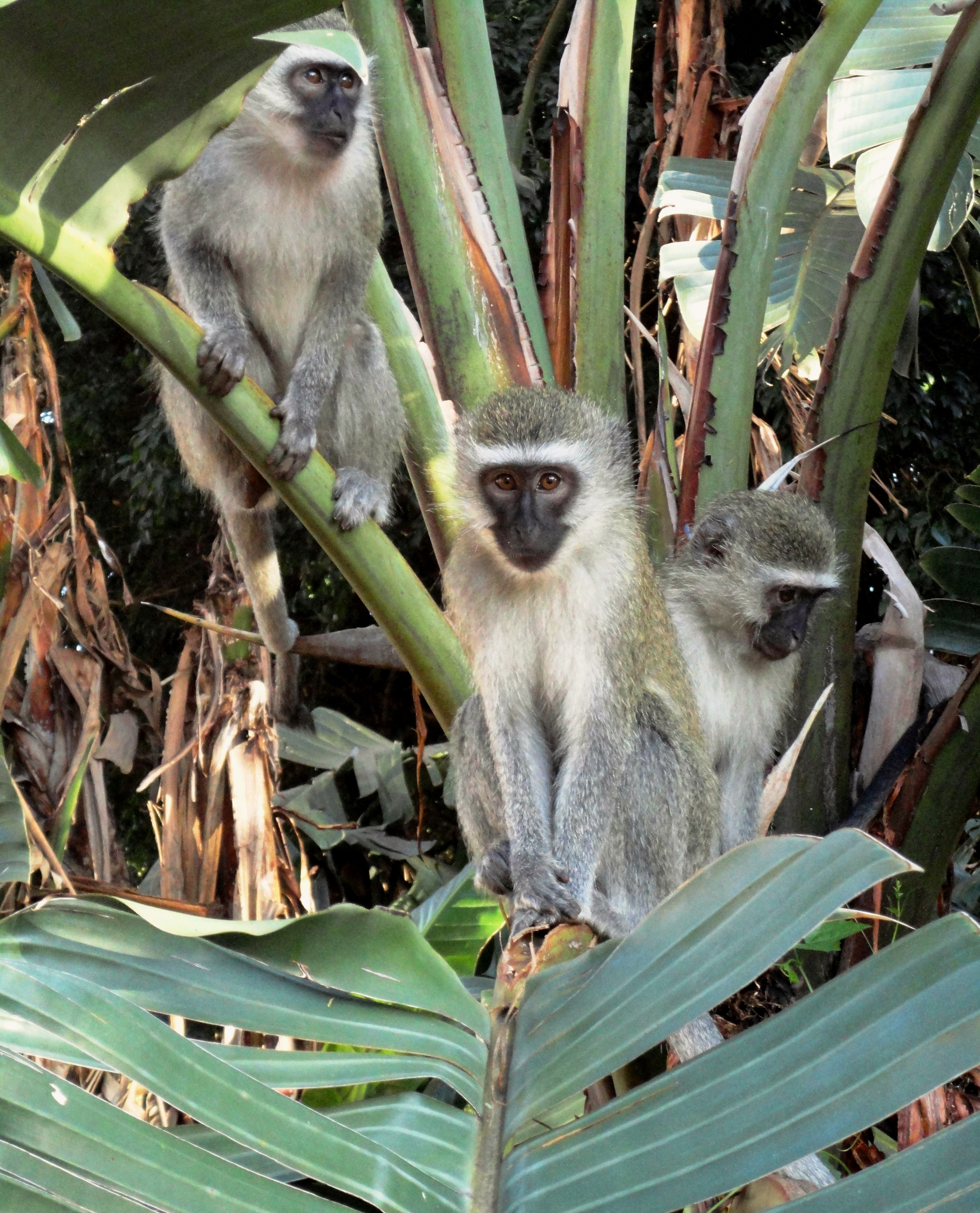
vervet monkey troop

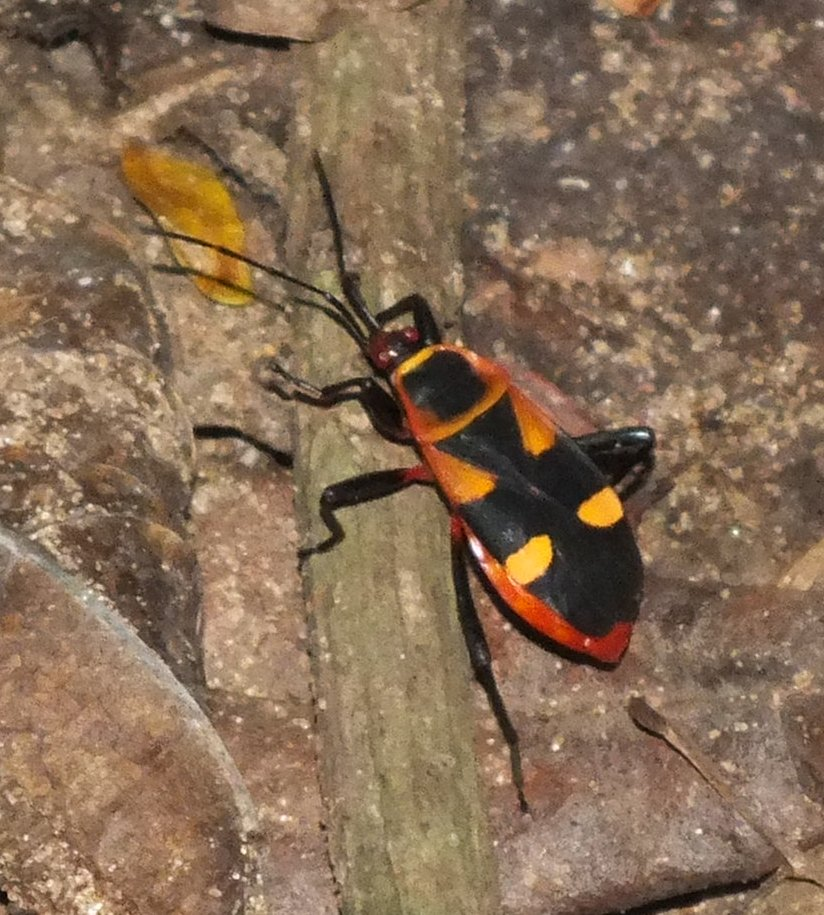
Roscius bug on forest floor

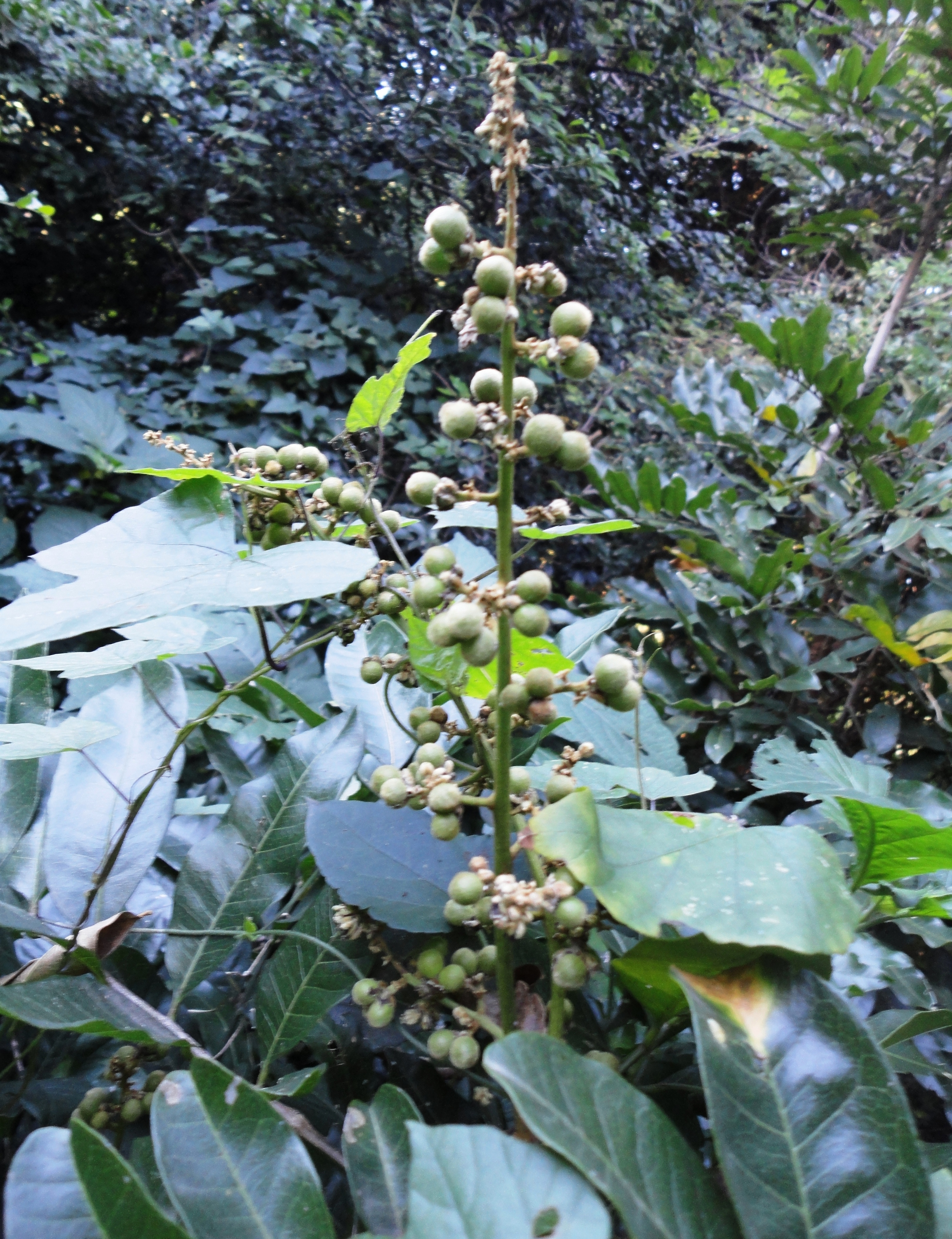
fruiting Deinbollia oblongifolia

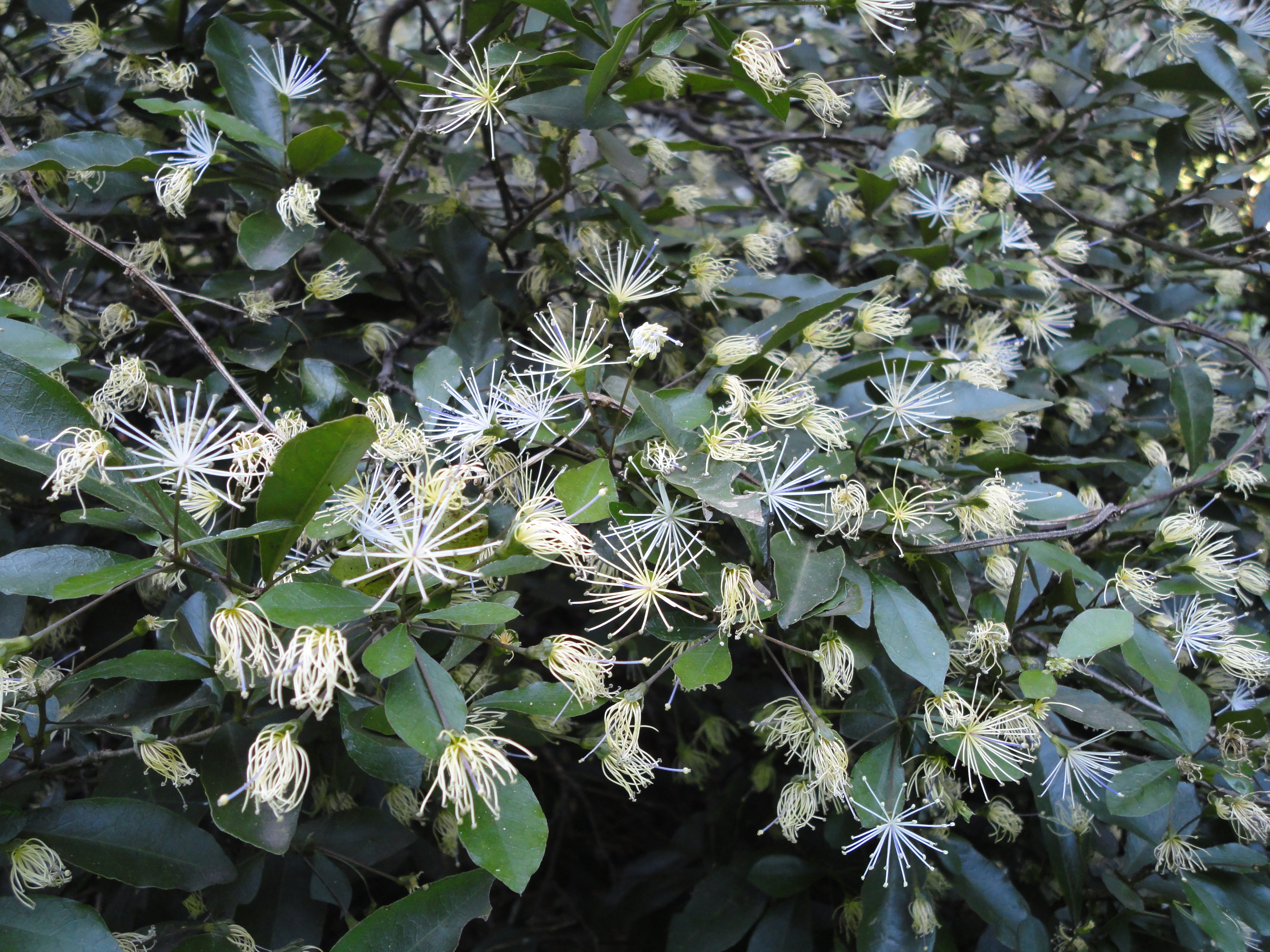
flowering Maerua racemulosa
