= Woodhaven, Durban =

- Location within KwaZulu-Natal Location within South Africa
- Coordinates: 29°55′39″S 30°57′24″E
- Country: South Africa
- Province: KwaZulu-Natal
- Municipality: eThekwini
- Main Place: Durban

Area
  - Total: 0.85 km^{2} (0.33 sq mi)

Population (2011)
  - Total: 3,361
  - Density: 4,000/km^{2} (10,000/sq mi)

Racial makeup (2011)
  - Black African: 54.7%
  - Coloured: 3.4%
  - Indian/Asian: 26.8%
  - White: 14.9%
  - Other: 0.2%

First languages (2011)
  - Zulu: 44.1%
  - English: 48.1%
  - Afrikaans: 2.6%
  - Xhosa: 1.3%
  - Other: 3.9%
- Time zone: UTC+2 (SAST)

Woodhaven is a southern suburb of Durban, KwaZulu-Natal, South Africa. It lies just east of Yellowwood Park and borders Woodlands to its east.
