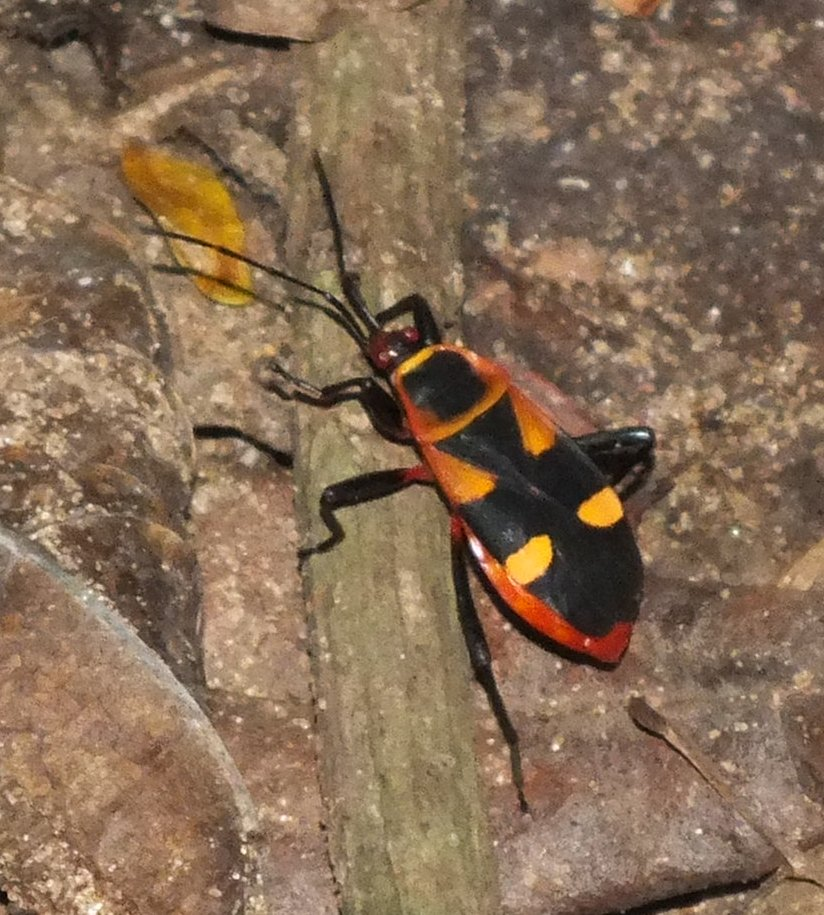
- Roscius sp. in Burman Bush, Durban

Scientific classification
- Domain: Eukaryota
- Kingdom: Animalia
- Phylum: Arthropoda
- Class: Insecta
- Order: Hemiptera
- Suborder: Heteroptera
- Family: Pyrrhocoridae
- Genus: Roscius; Stål, 1865

= Roscius (bug) =

Genus of true bugs

Roscius is an Afrotropical genus of true bugs in the family Pyrrhocoridae, the cotton stainers. They are often confused with bugs in the family Lygaeidae, such as the genus Oncopeltus, but can be distinguished by the lack of ocelli on the head.
