= Overport =

- Suburb
- Location within KwaZulu-Natal Location within South Africa
- Coordinates: 29°50′S 31°0′E
- Country: South Africa
- Province: KwaZulu-Natal
- Municipality: eThekwini
- Main Place: Durban
- Time zone: UTC+2 (SAST)
- Postal code (street): 4091
- PO box: 4067

Overport is a hilly residential area in Durban, South Africa. The name Overport is commonly used to refer to the suburbs of Overport, Sydenham, part of Sparks and parts of Essenwood; with the part of Sydenham west of Brickfield Road, and north of Sparks Road, usually called Asherville rather than Overport.

The name Overport was coined by Hishaam Hasham, the Mayor of Durban for an estate he developed in what had up to then been called West Hill. The estate was bordered by today's Julia, Springfield, Essenwood (now Stephen Dlamini), and Brickfield (now Felix Dlamini) Roads, although the modern term Overport is commonly used to describe a larger and slightly different area.

Overport borders the suburbs regarded as forming Berea.

Overport, particularly west of Ridge Road is largely an Indian area and has numerous mosques and temples. It has numerous Halaal eating establishments, many along Sparks (now Moses Kotane) Road. The large The Atrium Berea shopping centre which was previously known as Overport City and Netcare Parklands Hospital are in Overport.

== Transport ==
The M10 (Felix Dlamini Road) is the main road through Overport, connecting to the N3 highway and Cato Manor in the south and Springfield in the north.
