= Wiggins, Durban =

Wiggins
- Location within KwaZulu-Natal Location within South Africa
- Coordinates: 29.8521°S 30.9635°E
- Country: South Africa
- Province: KwaZulu-Natal
- Municipality: eThekwini

Area
  - Total: 2.68 km^{2} (1.03 sq mi)

Population (2011)
  - Total: 35,504
  - Density: 13,200/km^{2} (34,300/sq mi)

Racial makeup (2011)
  - Black African: 97.7%
  - Coloured: 0.35%
  - Indian/Asian: 1.45%
  - White: 0.05%
  - Other: 0.45%

First languages (2011)
  - Zulu: 80.0%
  - Xhosa: 9.2%
  - English: 3.9%
  - Sotho: 2.2%
  - Other: 4.7%
- Time zone: UTC+2 (SAST)
- Postal code (street): 4091

Wiggins is a large black residential area in central Durban, KwaZulu-Natal, South Africa.
