= UMkumbaan =

uMkumbaan
- Location within KwaZulu-Natal Location within South Africa
- Coordinates: 29.8697°S 30.9556°E
- Country: South Africa
- Province: KwaZulu-Natal
- Municipality: eThekwini

Area
  - Total: 2.30 km^{2} (0.89 sq mi)

Population (2011)
  - Total: 5,546
  - Density: 2,410/km^{2} (6,250/sq mi)

Racial makeup (2011)
  - Black African: 93.8%
  - Coloured: 1.1%
  - Indian/Asian: 4.6%
  - White: 0.1%
  - Other: 0.2%

First languages (2011)
  - Zulu: 86.0%
  - Xhosa: 5.25%
  - English: 3.85%
  - Other: 4.9%
- Time zone: UTC+2 (SAST)
- Postal code (street): 4001

uMkhumbane is a residential area in central Durban, KwaZulu-Natal, South Africa.
