= Tonga, Mpumalanga =

Tonga
- Location within Mpumalanga Location within South Africa
- Coordinates: 25.675°S 31.877°E
- Country: South Africa
- Province: Mpumalanga
- District: Ehlanzeni
- Municipality: Nkomazi

Area
  - Total: 7.47 km^{2} (2.88 sq mi)

Population (2011)
  - Total: 17,333
  - Density: 2,320/km^{2} (6,010/sq mi)

Racial makeup (2011)
  - Black African: 99.8%
  - Indian/Asian: 0.1%

First languages (2011)
  - Swazi: 81.3%
  - Tsonga: 17.5%
  - Other: 1.2%
- Time zone: UTC+2 (SAST)
- Postal code (street): 1385
- PO box: 1385

Tonga is a town in Ehlanzeni District Municipality in the Mpumalanga province of South Africa.
