= Asherville, Durban =

Suburb of Durban, South Africa

Asherville is a residential area west of central Durban, South Africa. It consists of parts of Sydenham, north of Moses Kotane (Sparks) Road, and west of Felix Dhlamini (Brickfield) Road, and includes parts of Springfield.

In 1944, the Springfield Indian municipal housing scheme began, this was one of Durban's smaller housing schemes. It remains a largely Indian area, with a David Landau Community Centre, named after a local medical doctor who set up practice in 1946 and died unexpectedly in 1948. The suburb was also known for the Balkumar Singh Pool, the first a municipal pool created for Indians under apartheid segregation. The pool was built due to 23 years of persistent campaigning by Balkumar Singh, a well known Indian life guard.

Asherville was the also the site of Springfield teachers' training college for Indian teachers, and the King George V Hospital (now the King Dinuzulu hospital). It was widely suspected that the area was set aside for Indians under the apartheid Group Areas Act as a buffer area to limit exposure of the white population to tuberculosis at the hospital.
