= Sherwood, Durban =

Suburb of Durban, South Africa

Sherwood
- Suburb
- Location within KwaZulu-Natal Location within South Africa
- Coordinates: 29.8348°S 30.9674°E
- Country: South Africa
- Province: KwaZulu-Natal
- Municipality: eThekwini
- Main Place: Durban

Area
  - Total: 2.87 km^{2} (1.11 sq mi)

Population (2011)
  - Total: 7,102
  - Density: 2,470/km^{2} (6,410/sq mi)

Racial makeup (2011)
  - Black African: 36.3%
  - Coloured: 9.0%
  - Indian/Asian: 44.4%
  - White: 9.4%
  - Other: 0.9%

First languages (2011)
  - Zulu: 26.1%
  - Xhosa: 4.3%
  - English: 64.1%
  - Afrikaans: 1.8%
  - Other: 3.7%
- Time zone: UTC+2 (SAST)
- Postal code (street): 4091
- PO box: 6034
- Area code: 031

Sherwood is a suburb of Durban in KwaZulu-Natal, South Africa, approximately 6 kilometres (3.7 mi) north-west of the city centre.

== Geography ==
Sherwood is situated towards the north-western boundary of Durban with Westville, and borders on Clare Hills to the north, Sparks to the east, Bonela to the south and Westville to the west.

== Safety ==
In terms of policing, Sherwood is covered by the policing precinct of Sydenham SAPS (located on the border between Sherwood and Sparks).

== Transport ==
Sherwood is situated along the M13 (King Cetshwayo Highway) connecting the Durban CBD to the south-east with Westville to the west. The M15 (Locksley Drive; Moses Kotane Road) from Overport to the west terminates at the intersection with the M13 in Sherwood.
