= Rivonia (song) =

"The Men of Rivonia" (1964) is a song by Hamish Henderson, a Scottish songwriter. It refers to the Rivonia Trial and calls for the release of Nelson Mandela and the other defendants in the trial. It is written to the tune of the Spanish Civil War song Viva la Quinta Brigada. It was recorded by the Corrie Folk Trio.
