= Windermere, Durban =

Windermere
- Suburb
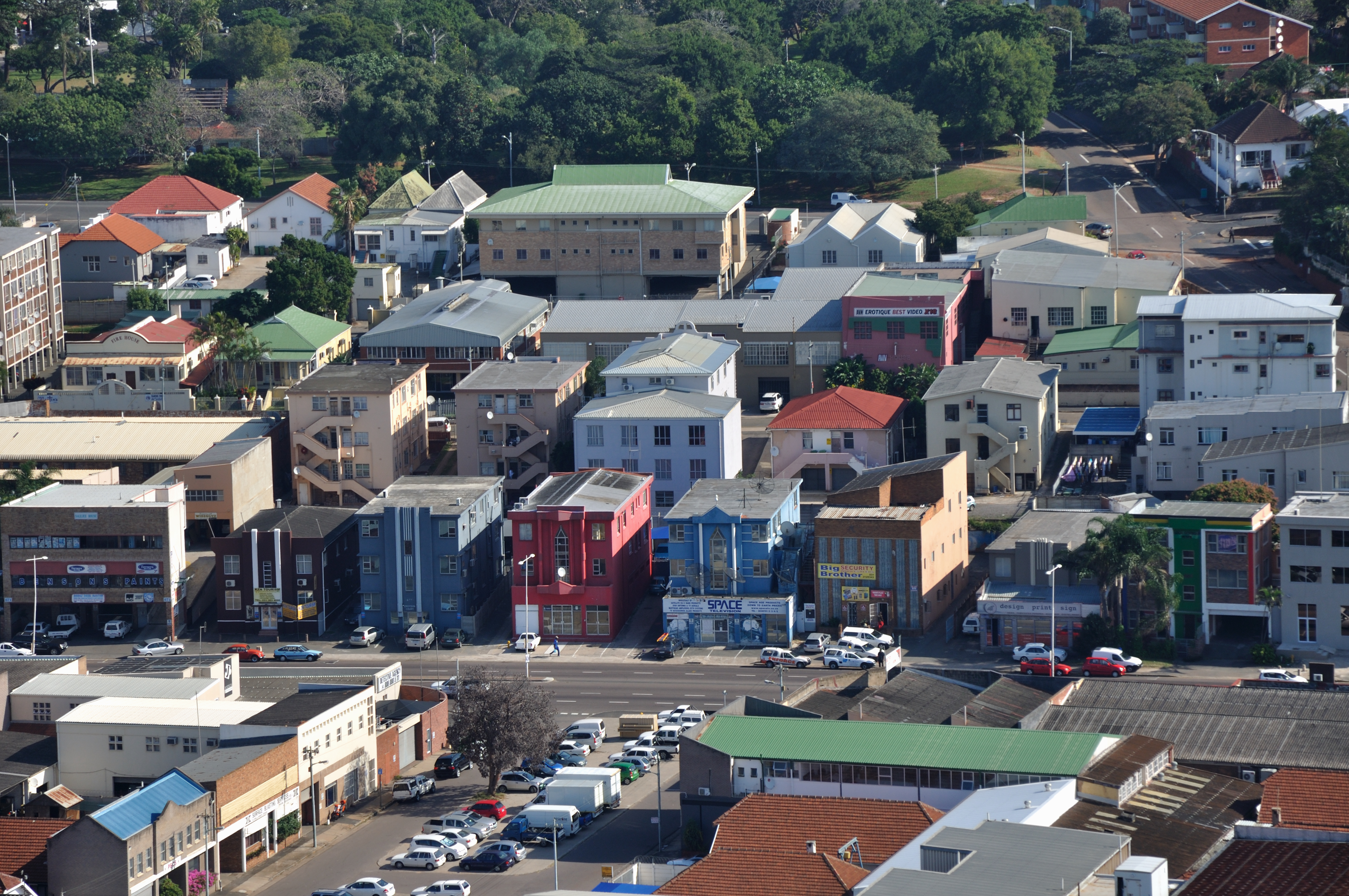
- Retail area in Umgeni Road, Windermere, Durban

- Location within KwaZulu-Natal Location within South Africa
- Coordinates: 29.8312°S 31.0216°E
- Country: South Africa
- Province: KwaZulu-Natal
- Municipality: eThekwini
- Main Place: Durban

Area
  - Total: 2.22 km^{2} (0.86 sq mi)

Population (2001)
  - Total: 6,777
  - Density: 3,050/km^{2} (7,910/sq mi)

Racial makeup (2001)
  - Black African: 20.0%
  - Coloured: 4.2%
  - Indian/Asian: 12.1%
  - White: 63.7%

First languages (2001)
  - English: 78.0%
  - Zulu: 15.1%
  - Afrikaans: 2.4%
  - Xhosa: 2.0%
  - Other: 2.5%
- Time zone: UTC+2 (SAST)
- Postal code (street): 4001
- PO box: n/a
- Area code: 031

Windermere is a suburb in the heart of Durban, South Africa, situated approximately 2 kilometres (1.2 mi) north of the city centre. The area includes the restaurant district of Florida Road and the factory shop district of Stamford Hill Road.

== Culture and Contemporary Lifestyle ==
Located in the heart of Windermere, Florida Road is a 2 kilometre stretch of restaurants, cafes, bistros, pubs, nightclubs, art galleries and eclectic shops such as tobacconists and tattoo parlours. It has grown into a destination for Durban’s visitors and an entertainment hub within the inner city. Its historic buildings that have been restored and repurposed for contemporary use.

Like most of Windermere, Florida Road was once an affluent part of Durban until the early 1990s, when it fell into urban decay. It then experienced its initial cycle of urban regeneration with investors and property developers repurposing old heritage homes on the road into general business and commercial uses.

However, about a decade later Florida Road once again fell into urban decay due to uncontrolled night life disturbing residents and an increase in crime that threatened the safety and security of patrons and owners. To mitigate this challenge, local property owners, businesses and community groups came together to form the Florida Road Urban Improvement Precinct (UIP) in 2013 following the success of the uMhlanga UIP. The purpose of the UIP is to manage the public space along the full length of Florida Road including properties on both sides of the road.

== Geography ==
Situated on the lower end of the Berea, Windermere borders on Morningside to the north and west, Essenwood and Greyville to the south and Stamford Hill to the east.

== Politics ==
Windermere is classed under Ward 27 in terms of IEC's demarcation which includes Essenwood, Morningside, Windermere and Stamford Hill.

The elected Councillor for this ward is Ernest Smith who represents the ward in the eThekwini Council & was elected in 2019 replacing former Councillor (now MPL) Martin Meyer who was elected to serve in the KwaZulu-Natal Provincial Legislature on behalf of the Democratic Alliance.

== Retail ==
Located along Lilian Ngoyi Road, Windermere Centre, is the main shopping centre in the neighbourhood and is located below a prominent apartment block. Completed in 1976, Windermere Centre recently had a facelift in 2014, introducing new tenants such as Woolworths Food, Willow, Anthology, joining the existing tenants of Checkers, Clicks and Mr Price amongst others.

== Safety ==
Windermere is divided over two SAPS precincts. The section west of Lilian Ngoyi Road is covered by Berea SAPS (located in Musgrave) and the section east of Lilian Ngoyi Road is covered by Durban Central SAPS (located in North Beach).

== Transport ==
=== Roads ===
The two main roads intersecting Windermere include the R102 to the east and the M17 to the south. The R102 (Umgeni Road) connects Avoca to the north with Durban CBD to the south. The M17 (Sandile Thusi Road) connects Stamford Hill to the east with Springfield to the west.

=== Streets ===
Lilian Ngoyi Road (previously named Windermere Road) in the heart of Windermere is one of the main streets in the suburb and one of the longest streets in Durban. It stretches north–south from Anerley Road in neighbouring Morningside to the major intersection near Greyville Racecourse.
