= St. Henry's Marist College =

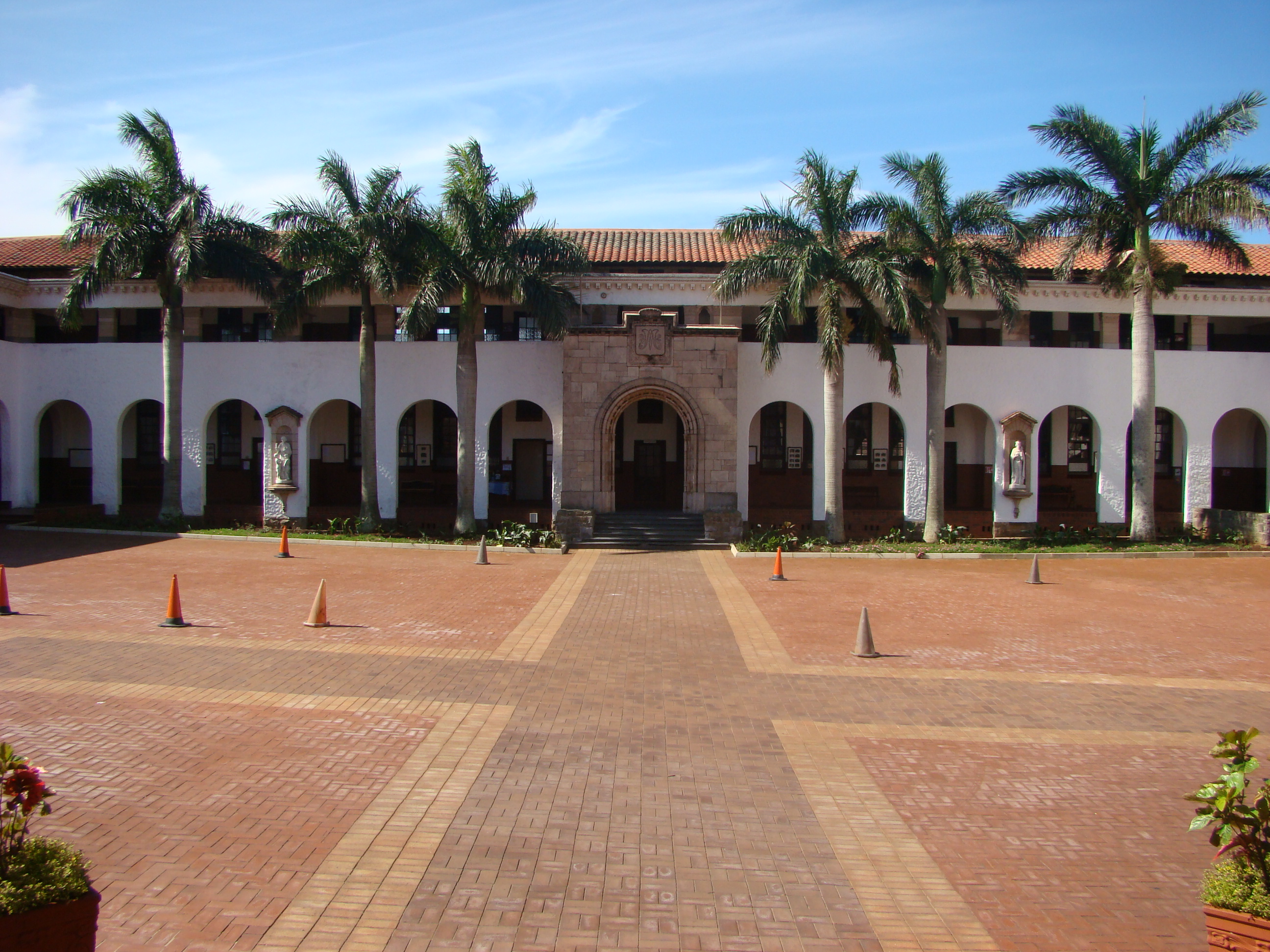
- Main school building
- Glenwood, Durban, KwaZulu-Natal; South Africa

Information
- Type: Private, Catholic
- Motto: Omnia Vincite (Conquer all difficulties(everything))
- Established: 1929
- Locale: Suburban
- Headmaster: Dr Stephen Leech
- Exam Board: IEB
- Grades: 000–12
- Enrollment: 760 boys and girls
- Colours: Navy & Gold
- Song: "Non Nobis Domine"
- Mascot: Lion
- Website: www.sthenrys.co.za

St. Henry's Marist College, formerly known as St Henry's Marist Brothers' College is a co-educational private school with a Catholic foundation in Glenwood, Durban, KwaZulu-Natal, South Africa.

== History ==
Saint Marcellin Champagnat, a young priest in rural south-east France, founded the Marist Brothers to educate the poor. The Brothers then spread to many parts of the world, arriving in Cape Town in 1867. In 1929, (after the Brothers had opened St. Charles College, Pietermaritzburg), the Brothers opened St Henry's with Brother Paul Eusterius as principal. Since then the school has greatly expanded, particularly under the previous principal, Dr Anthony Akal, who was at the helm from 1982 until 2011. The school has a wonderful aspect, along the Ridge above Durban with a view over the City to the bay on the one side and inland towards the Valley of a Thousand Hills on the other.

The school started as a day school for boys, but has recently become co-educational. The Brothers gradually withdrew from the teaching life of the school (which is now under lay control) but still play a major part in the religious aspects of the school, upon which the College prides itself. The emphasis on religion, discipline and a strong sense of a "school-family" add to the school's appeal.

The school motto is Omnia Vincite, which means Conquer all difficulties.

== Facilities ==
=== General facilities ===
The school recently refurbished the tuck shop. The school also has four fields, an amphitheater, an observatory, and a state-of-the-art Learning Resources Center, which contains a library section, teaching venues, a computer room and a Long Distance Audio Visual room. Many of the school's classrooms were recently equipped with Smartboards.

The school also has a gymnasium, chapel and two laboratories. The Foundation Phase playground and school gardens have also been significantly improved.

=== Recent expansions ===
In 2010, the College moved its Art Department to a large house next to the school. The ground floor of this house was converted into a teaching venue complete with a small library, classroom, office and veranda for working on large projects. An Academic Support Center has been launched on the upper floors of the house.

The College also recently expanded its Music School, which now contains four practice rooms, and a main teaching room. Each room has been soundproofed, and the syllabus has been broadened to include music as an official school subject.

The school is a member of the Durban Youth Council, and has a strong representation in the organisation.
