= Mount Vernon, Durban =

Mount Vernon
- Location within KwaZulu-Natal Location within South Africa
- Coordinates: 29.8936°S 30.9382°E
- Country: South Africa
- Province: KwaZulu-Natal
- Municipality: eThekwini

Area
  - Total: 2.53 km^{2} (0.98 sq mi)

Population (2011)
  - Total: 6,255
  - Density: 2,470/km^{2} (6,400/sq mi)

Racial makeup (2011)
  - Black African: 23.0%
  - Coloured: 2.8%
  - Indian/Asian: 37.4%
  - White: 35.7%
  - Other: 1.1%

First languages (2011)
  - English: 66.6%
  - Afrikaans: 14.3%
  - Zulu: 13.3%
  - Xhosa: 2.4%
  - Other: 3.4%
- Time zone: UTC+2 (SAST)
- Postal code (street): 4094

Mount Vernon is a suburb in the south of Durban, KwaZulu-Natal, South Africa.
