= Rivonia Square =

Former retail centre in South Africa

Rivonia Square is the previous name of a shopping centre, including shops, the post office, a fitness centre and restaurants, along a thoroughfare called Rivonia Boulevard in Rivonia, Johannesburg. Late in 2012 the centre was renamed 'Oriental City'. It includes the area occupied by the first shopping centre built on the site – the Cloisters Shopping Centre. The Cloisters took its name from the Rivonia Convent, a closed order of Carmelite nuns, which originally existed on the site.
