= Glenwood, KwaZulu-Natal =

Glenwood
- Suburb
- Location within KwaZulu-Natal Location within South Africa
- Coordinates: 29°53′S 30°59′E
- Country: South Africa
- Province: KwaZulu-Natal
- Municipality: eThekwini
- Main Place: Durban

Area
  - Total: 1.66 km^{2} (0.64 sq mi)

Population (2001)
  - Total: 5,617
  - Density: 3,380/km^{2} (8,760/sq mi)

Racial makeup (2001)
  - Black African: 21.2%
  - Coloured: 2.35%
  - Indian/Asian: 6.2%
  - White: 70.3%

First languages (2001)
  - English: 75.1%
  - Zulu: 15.4%
  - Afrikaans: 4.6%
  - Xhosa: 2.7%
- Time zone: UTC+2 (SAST)
- Postal code (street): 4001
- Area code: 031

Glenwood is a suburb located approximately 2 kilometres (1.2 mi) south-west of the city centre of Durban in KwaZulu-Natal, South Africa.

== Geography ==
Situated on the lower end of the Berea, Glenwood borders on Bulwer to the north, KwaKhangela (Congella) to the east, Umbilo to the south and the University of KwaZulu-Natal (Howard College Campus) to the west.

== Transport ==
=== Roads ===
The M8 (ZK Matthews Road) is the main thoroughfare through Glenwood connecting Glenwood with Bulwer and Musgrave to the north. ZK Matthews Road continues southward towards Umbilo without the M8 designation.

Other key arterial routes in Glenwood include:

- R102 (Umbilo Road; Sydney Road) – connects Durban CBD to the north-east with Umbilo and Rossburgh to the south
- M32 (Rick Turner Road) – connects Maydon Wharf to the east with Cato Manor to the west

== Education ==
Schools in the area include Glenwood High School, Glenwood Preparatory School (formerly Parkview Primary School), Glenwood Junior Primary School, Open Air School, Penzance Primary School, St. Henry's Marist College and Durban Girls' High School.

The western part of Glenwood is dominated by the University of KwaZulu-Natal’s Howard College Campus. Previously the location of the University of Natal, Howard College offers a wide range of faculties including Engineering, Humanities and Law and Management amongst others.

== Political History ==
The current Ward Councillor for Glenwood under Ward 33 in the Ethekwini Municipality is the DA’s Sakhile Mngadi (28) who is the youngest Ward Councillor in the city as elected in the November 2021 Local Government Elections.
