= Yellowwood Park =

- Location within KwaZulu-Natal Location within South Africa
- Coordinates: 29.91°S 30.91°E
- Country: South Africa
- Province: KwaZulu-Natal
- Municipality: eThekwini

Area
  - Total: 2.48 km^{2} (0.96 sq mi)

Population (2011)
  - Total: 5,216
  - Density: 2,100/km^{2} (5,450/sq mi)
- Time zone: UTC+2 (SAST)
- Postal code (street): 4004
- PO box: 4011

Yellowwood Park is a quiet suburb of the city of Durban, South Africa, established in 1960. It is 14 km southwest of central Durban.

The land was given to the city of Durban by Kenneth Stainbank, who also established the Kenneth Stainbank Nature Reserve located in the suburb. The Stainbank family home, Coedmore Castle, still stands in the reserve.

== Places of interest ==
- The Centre for Rehabilitation of Wildlife (CROW) is based in Yellowwood Park. School groups often visit the centre for the children to learn about the need to protect wild animals and birds.
- The Kenneth Stainbank Nature Reserve protects indigenous coastal riverine forest and bush clump grassland mosaic. It has some wonderful trails and picnic sites.
- The Civic Centre is an attractive building built in Cape Dutch style. It is often used for weddings.

== Birdlife ==
Yellowwood Park is a green and leafy suburb that supports an impressive array of birdlife. Many of the roads, like Lark Lane, Kestrel Crescent, and Wren Way, are named after local birds. Notable birds to be found in the area include African goshawks, purple-crested turacos, white-eared barbets, black-headed orioles, golden-tailed woodpeckers, yellow-bellied greenbuls, African dusky flycatchers, spectacles weavers, black sparrowhawks, black cuckooshrikes, brown-hooded kingfishers, and black-bellied starlings.
