= Bonela, Durban =

Bonela
- Location within KwaZulu-Natal Location within South Africa
- Coordinates: 29.8438°S 30.9725°E
- Country: South Africa
- Province: KwaZulu-Natal
- Municipality: eThekwini

Government
  - Councillor: Warren Burne (Democratic Alliance)

Area
  - Total: 2.46 km^{2} (0.95 sq mi)

Population (2011)
  - Total: 12,332
  - Density: 5,010/km^{2} (13,000/sq mi)

Racial makeup (2011)
  - Black African: 41.6%
  - Coloured: 12.3%
  - Indian/Asian: 44.3%
  - White: 1.3%
  - Other: 0.5%

First languages (2011)
  - Zulu: 31.9%
  - Xhosa: 2.3%
  - English: 60.7%
  - Afrikaans: 1.3%
  - Other: 3.8%
- Time zone: UTC+2 (SAST)
- Postal code (street): 4091

Bonela is a mixed race, middle class residential area in central Durban, KwaZulu-Natal, South Africa. Got the best Naat reciter in South Africa
