= Mitchell Park Zoo =

- Interactive map of Mitchell Park Zoo
- 29.825487°S 31.01132°E
- Location: Durban, South Africa
- Website: www.durban.gov.za/City_Services/ParksRecreation/pnature/Pages/mitchell.aspx

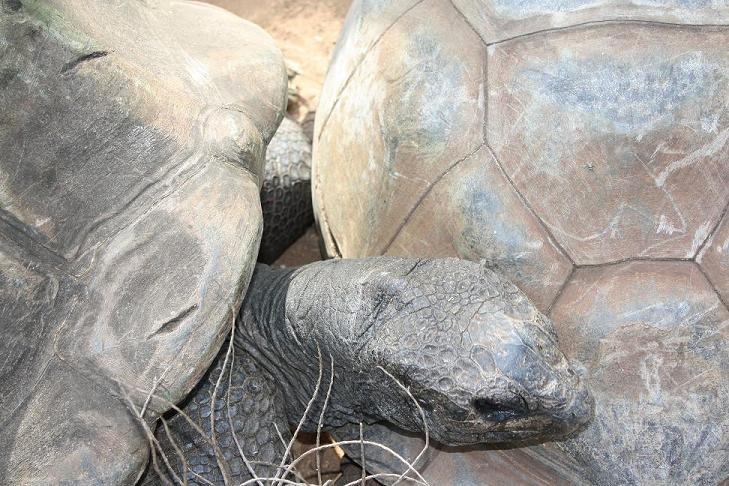
Aldabra giant tortoises at Mitchell Park Zoo

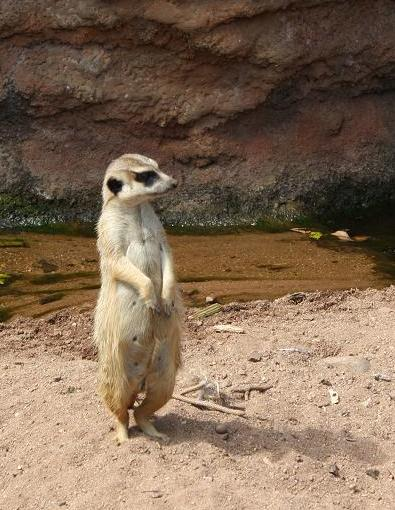
One of the Suricates at the Zoo

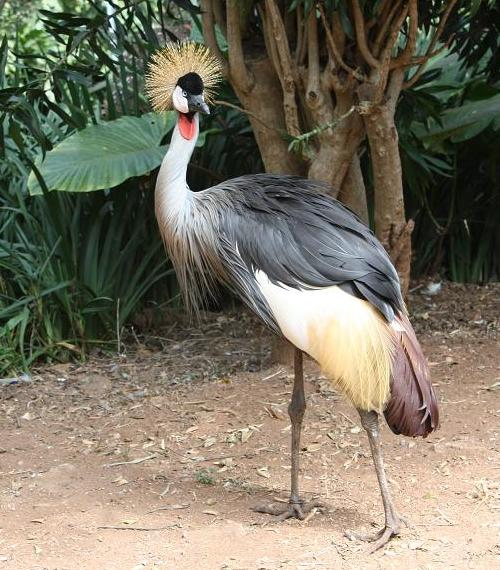
A Grey Crowned Crane at Mitchell Park

Mitchell Park Zoo is also known as Mitchell Park or Mitchell's Park. Situated in the Morningside suburb of Durban, South Africa, it is the only zoo in Durban.

The zoo was established as an Ostrich farm in 1910, but was unprofitable and started adding other animals. At one time it was home to many large animals, the most notable of which was an Indian Elephant named Nellie. Nellie was given to the zoo by the Maharajah of Mysore in 1928, and could blow a mouth organ and crack coconuts with her feet.

Today the Zoo holds various smaller animals such as blue duiker, small South American Monkeys, raccoons and various birds. The largest animals in the zoo today are Aldabra giant tortoises.

The zoo also includes a children's playground, a walk-through aviary, and the Blue Zoo tea garden, as well as a large lawn area for picnics. It is adjacent to Jameson Park, which was once a pineapple plantation.

== Mammals ==
- Suni
- Suricate
- Ground squirrel
- Banded mongoose
- White-eared marmosets
- Cotton-top tamarins
- Black-capped squirrel monkey
- Raccoons

== Birds ==
- Various species of parrots
- Black-shouldered and white Indian peafowls
- Grey crowned cranes
- Black swans
- Silver pheasants
- Nicobar pigeons
- Scarlet ibises
- Carolina wood ducks
- White imperial pigeons
