= Melrose, Johannesburg =

Melrose
- Location within Gauteng Location within South Africa
- Coordinates: 26.141°S 28.047°E
- Country: South Africa
- Province: Gauteng
- Municipality: City of Johannesburg
- Main Place: Johannesburg

Area
  - Total: 0.74 km^{2} (0.29 sq mi)

Population (2011)
  - Total: 1,103
  - Density: 1,500/km^{2} (3,900/sq mi)

Racial makeup (2011)
  - Black African: 36.1%
  - Coloured: 0.3%
  - Indian/Asian: 3.3%
  - White: 58.2%
  - Other: 2.1%

First languages (2011)
  - English: 62.9%
  - Zulu: 8.2%
  - Afrikaans: 7.7%
  - Tswana: 4.4%
  - Other: 16.9%
- Time zone: UTC+2 (SAST)

Melrose includes several suburbs of Johannesburg, South Africa. It is located in Region E of the City of Johannesburg Metropolitan Municipality. Melrose is a developing up-market suburb.

== History ==
The suburb has it origins when Henry Brown Marshall purchased land in the north of Johannesburg in 1893. Prior to the discovery of gold on the Witwatersrand in 1886, the suburb lay on land on one of the original farms that make up Johannesburg, called Syferfontein. It was called the Melrose Estate of 713 acres and at the time was 9.7km north of the central business district. He built his home there and planted trees on the land. The suburb was laid out in 1902.

== Melrose Arch ==
The Melrose Arch mixed-use development is located in Melrose. The development, which cost ZAR 800 million to build, began construction in 2007, with Phase One completed in November 2009. It contains 170,000 m2 of office and retail space, in addition to residential space and 2 hotels. The area is characterised by cobbled alleys, red brick buildings, and open-air cafés, and gives preference to pedestrians.

The retail area includes major retailers Truworths, Edgars, Woolworths, as well as the large Virgin Active Classic gym.

It is also known to light up the city during the festive season in December.
