= North Beach, Durban =

- Location within KwaZulu-Natal Location within South Africa
- Coordinates: 29.8392°S 31.0316°E
- Country: South Africa
- Province: KwaZulu-Natal
- Municipality: eThekwini

Area
  - Total: 0.55 km^{2} (0.21 sq mi)
- Elevation: 15 m (49 ft)

Population (2011)
  - Total: 7,296
  - Density: 13,000/km^{2} (34,000/sq mi)

Racial makeup (2011)
  - Black African: 18.4%
  - Coloured: 4.2%
  - Indian/Asian: 53.4%
  - White: 20.5%
  - Other: 3.5%

First languages (2011)
  - English: 77.1%
  - Zulu: 7.9%
  - Afrikaans: 4.7%
  - Other: 10.3%
- Time zone: UTC+2 (SAST)
- Area code: 031

North Beach is a residential area in central Durban, KwaZulu-Natal, South Africa.

== See also ==
- South Beach, Durban
