= Bellaire, Durban =

Bellair
- Location within KwaZulu-Natal Location within South Africa
- Coordinates: 29.8855°S 30.9554°E
- Country: South Africa
- Province: KwaZulu-Natal
- Municipality: eThekwini
- Main Place: Durban

Area
  - Total: 3.37 km^{2} (1.30 sq mi)

Population (2011)
  - Total: 6,384
  - Density: 1,890/km^{2} (4,910/sq mi)

Racial makeup (2011)
  - Black African: 48.0%
  - Coloured: 4.9%
  - Indian/Asian: 19.9%
  - White: 26.9%
  - Other: 0.3%

First languages (2011)
  - English: 46.7%
  - Zulu: 31.8%
  - Afrikaans: 11.1%
  - Xhosa: 3.7%
  - Other: 6.7%
- Time zone: UTC+2 (SAST)
- Postal code (street): 4006
- Area code: 031

Bellair is a suburb of Durban, KwaZulu-Natal, South Africa. It is administered by the eThekwini Metropolitan Municipality and its postal code is 4006.
