= Mayville, Durban =

Suburb of Durban, South Africa

Mayville
- Suburb
- Location within KwaZulu-Natal Location within South Africa
- Coordinates: 29°51′S 30°59′E
- Country: South Africa
- Province: KwaZulu-Natal
- Municipality: eThekwini
- Main Place: Durban

Government

Racial makeup (2011)

First languages (2011)
- Time zone: UTC+2 (SAST)
- Postal code (street): 4091
- PO box: 4058
- Area code: 031
- Website: www.durban.gov.za

Mayville is an area west of central Durban, South Africa. It has a post office, a police station and primary schools. It has a significant Indian population, who were targeted by the apartheid Group Areas Act.
