= Stamford Hill, Durban =

Stamford Hill
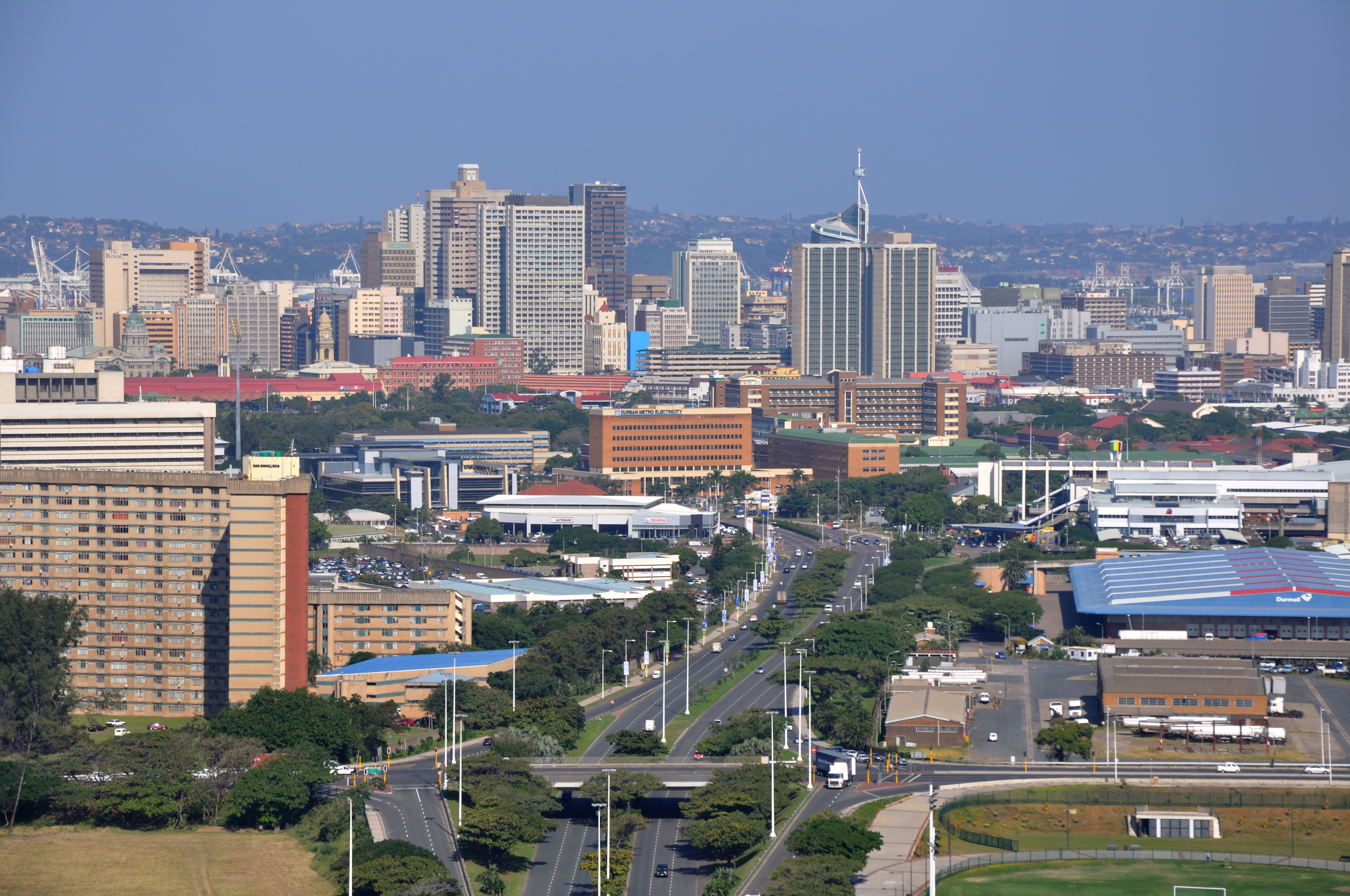
- Stamford Hill in foreground, flanking the M12 route, with Durban Central beyond

- Location within KwaZulu-Natal Location within South Africa
- Coordinates: 29.828°S 31.031°E
- Country: South Africa
- Province: KwaZulu-Natal
- Municipality: eThekwini
- Main Place: Durban

Area
  - Total: 6.09 km^{2} (2.35 sq mi)

Population (2011)
  - Total: 2,585
  - Density: 424/km^{2} (1,100/sq mi)

Racial makeup (2011)
  - Black African: 96.5%
  - Coloured: 0.9%
  - Indian/Asian: 1.4%
  - White: 1.1%
  - Other: 0.1%

First languages (2011)
  - Zulu: 58.4%
  - English: 13.2%
  - Xhosa: 9.7%
  - Afrikaans: 1.3%
  - Other: 17.3%
- Time zone: UTC+2 (SAST)
- Postal code (street): 4001
- PO box: 4025

Stamford Hill is a suburb of Durban, KwaZulu-Natal, South Africa. It is administered by the eThekwini Metropolitan Municipality and its postal code is 4001.

The suburb, located on the Indian Ocean coast, is non-residential and consists primarily of non-public open space. The Kings Park Sporting Precinct is home to the Moses Mabhida Stadium which opened in 2009 and was a venue for the 2010 FIFA World Cup, as well as a range of other sporting venues and facilities. North of the precinct is the Windsor Mashie Golf Course and the Durban Country Club. The southern section of the suburb, on the coast at Battery Beach, is home to Water World and the Suncoast Casino and Entertainment World.

== Politics ==
Stamford Hill is classed under Ward 27 in terms of IEC's demarcation which includes Essenwood, Morningside Windermere and Stamford Hill.

The elected Councillor for this ward is Ernest Smith who represents the ward in the eThekwini Council & was elected in 2019 replacing former Councillor (now MPL) Martin Meyer who was elected to serve in the KwaZulu-Natal Provincial Legislature on behalf of the Democratic Alliance.

== Geography ==
Located on the southern banks of the mouth of the uMngeni River, Stamford Hill borders on the Berea to the west, Durban North to the north, as well as Durban Central and North Beach to the south.

== Gallery ==
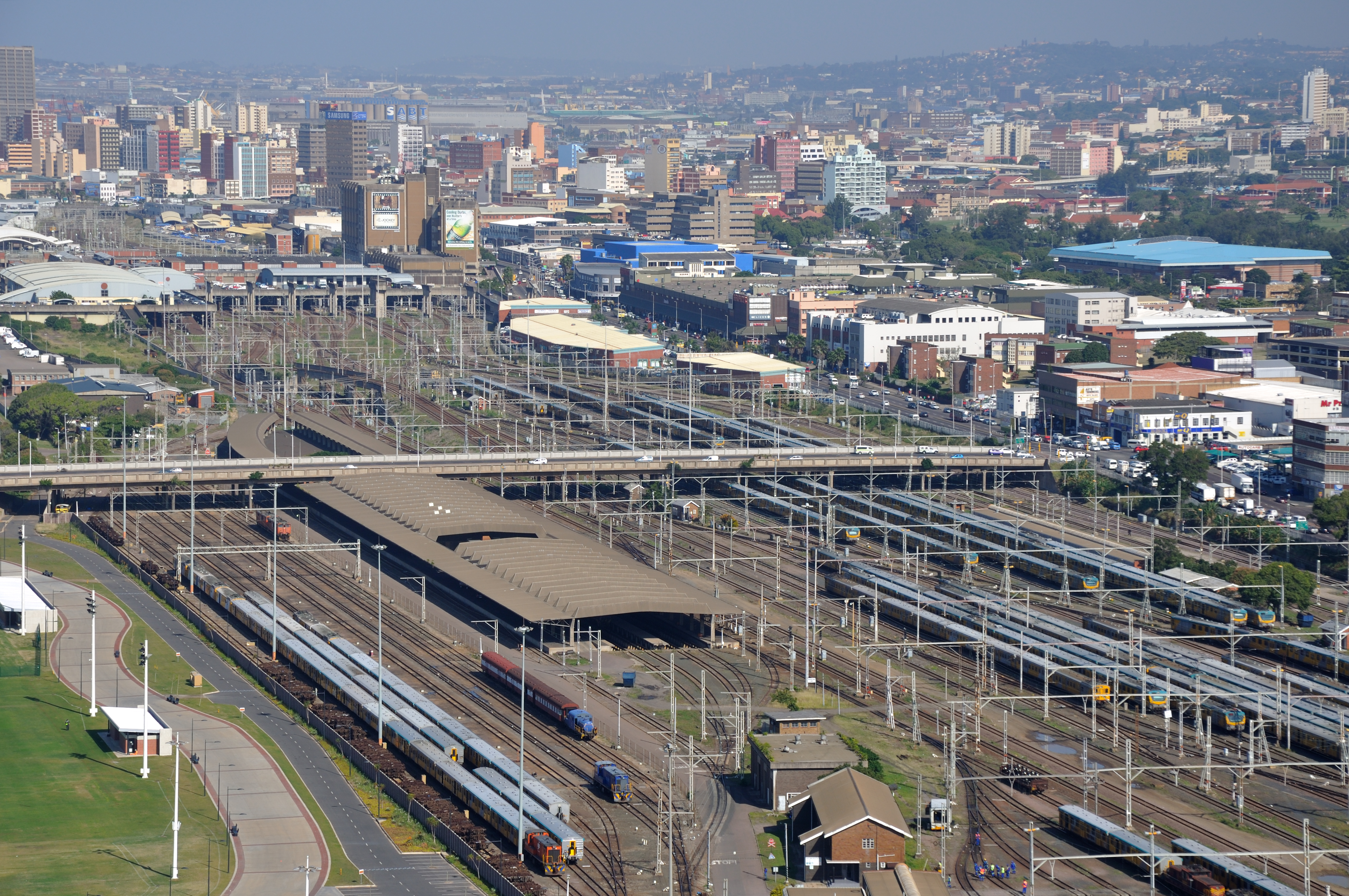
Durban railway station

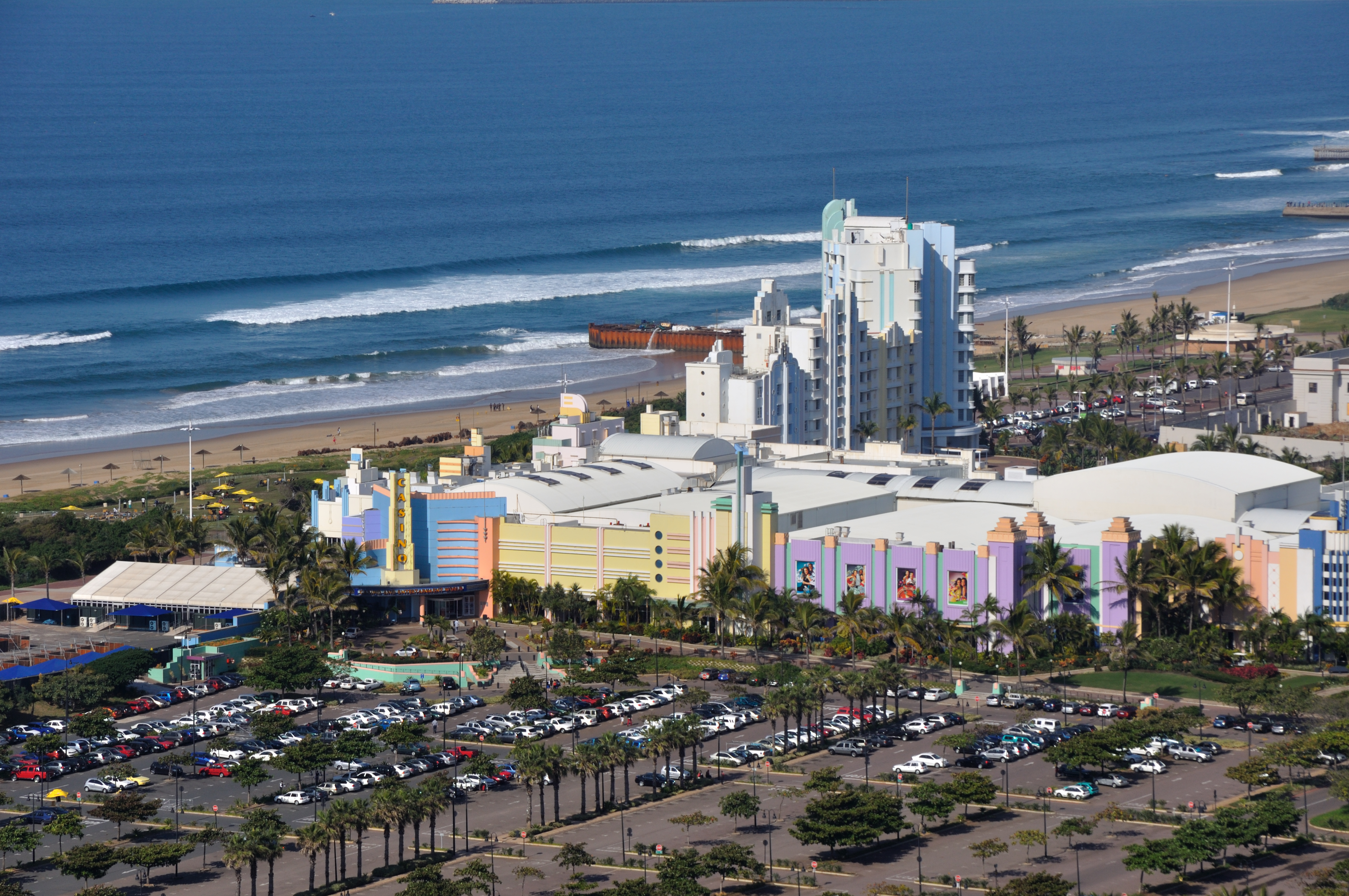
Suncoast Casino and Entertainment World

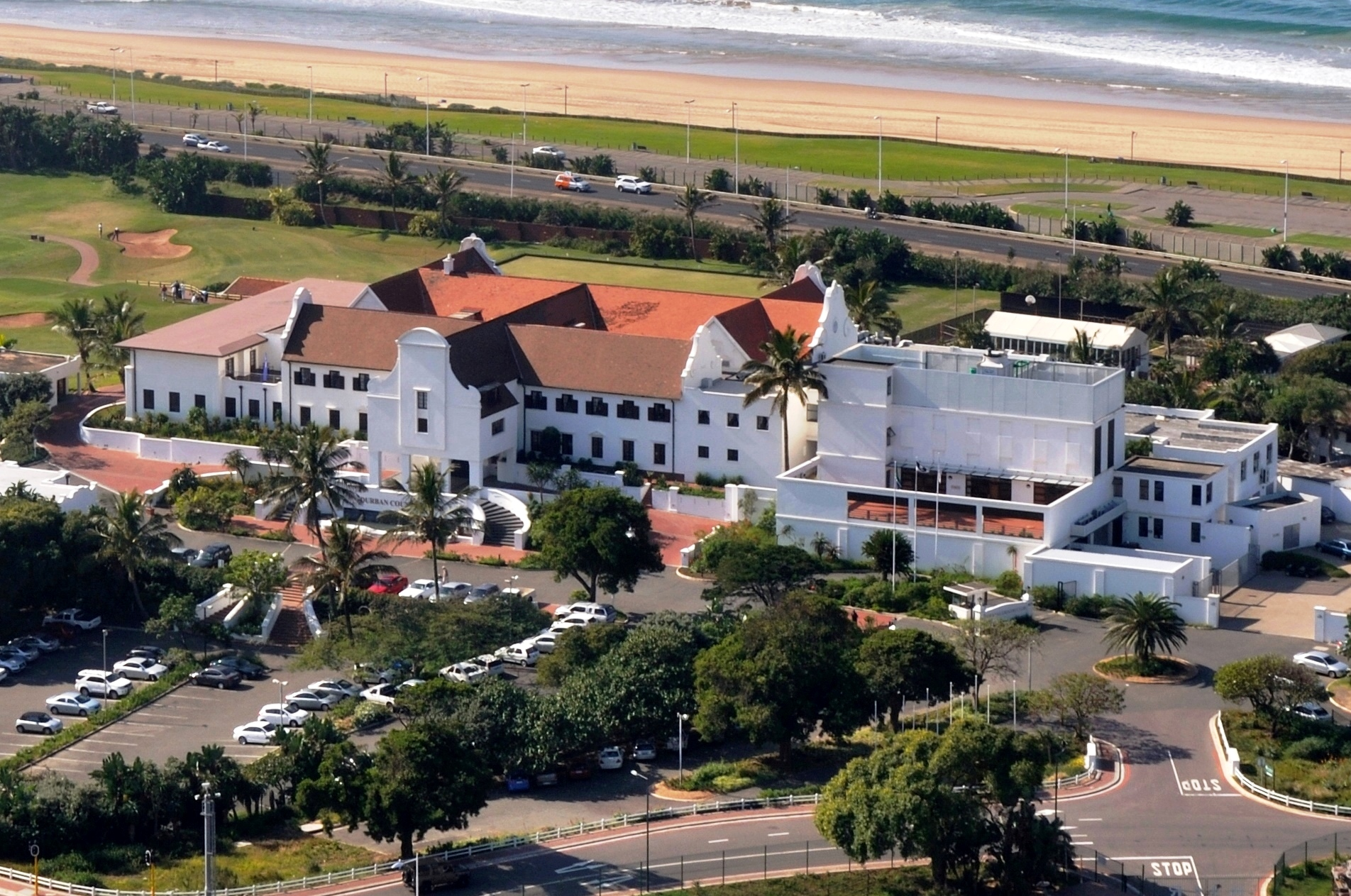
Buildings of the Durban Country Club

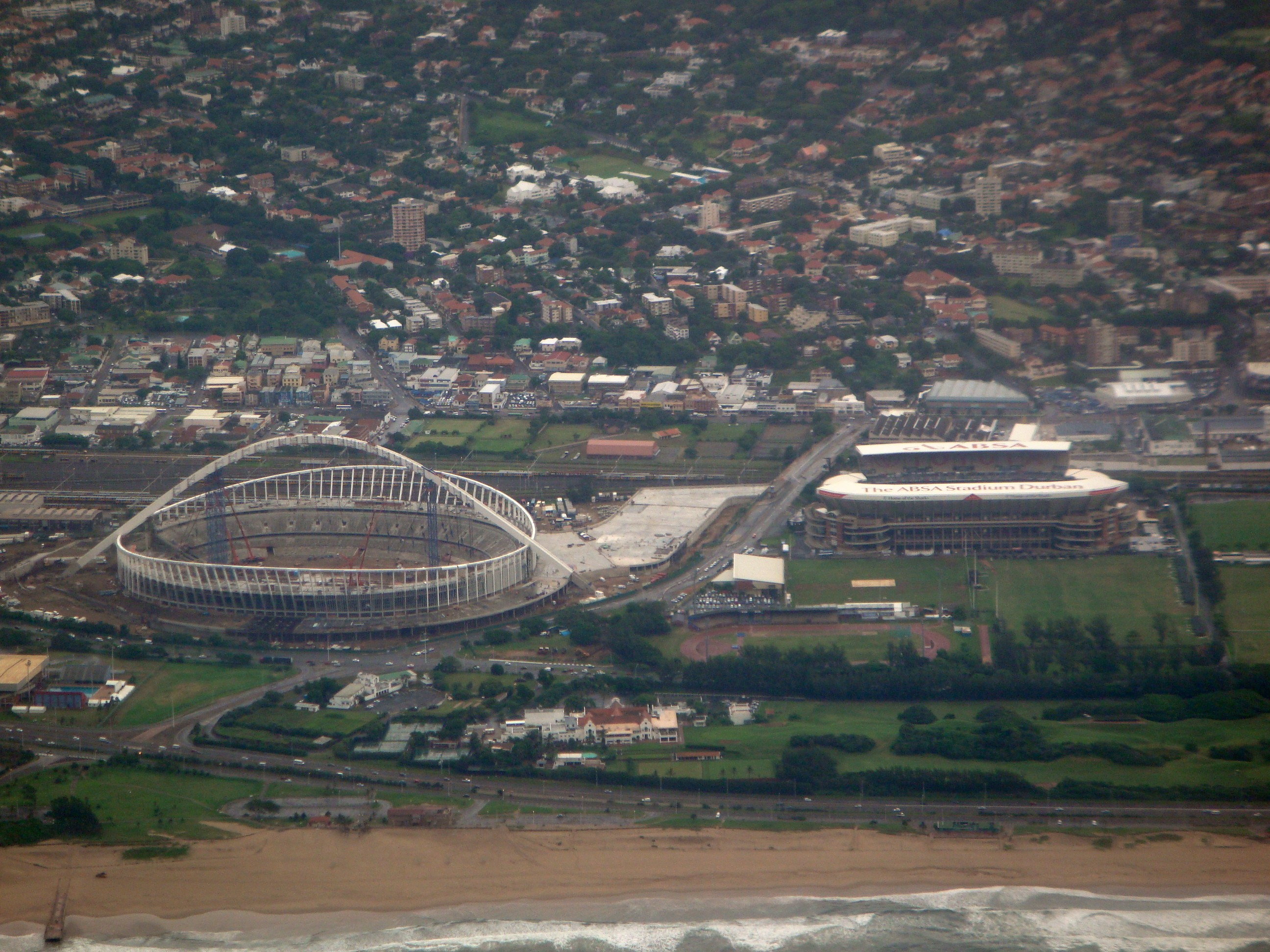
Kings Park Stadium right, in 2009, and the Moses Mabhida Stadium still under construction
