= Sydenham, Durban =

- Location within KwaZulu-Natal Location within South Africa
- Coordinates: 29.8283°S 30.9944°E
- Country: South Africa
- Province: KwaZulu-Natal
- Municipality: eThekwini
- Main Place: Durban

Area
  - Total: 1.78 km^{2} (0.69 sq mi)

Population (2001)
  - Total: 17,835
  - Density: 10,000/km^{2} (26,000/sq mi)

Racial makeup (2001)
  - Black African: 12.7%
  - Coloured: 7.3%
  - Indian/Asian: 79.6%
  - White: 0.4%

First languages (2001)
  - English: 85.4%
  - Zulu: 9.3%
  - Xhosa: 2.2%
  - Afrikaans: 0.4%
  - Other: 2.7%
- Time zone: UTC+2 (SAST)
- Postal code (street): 4091
- PO box: n/a
- Area code: 031

Sydenham is a suburb west of central Durban, South Africa.

== Sydenham added to Durban Municipality ==
Although the municipal area of Durban was quite sizeable, and until 1932 comprised some 12 square miles (31 km^{2}), a number of suburbs developed about its perimeter, and in 1921 village management boards were established at South Coast Junction, Umhlatuzana, Mayville, Sydenham and Greenwood Park.
