= Greyville, Durban =

Coordinates: 29°50′S 31°00′E

Greyville is an area in Durban, South Africa. It is on the flat land west of the Durban city centre, at the foot of the Berea. It includes the Greyville Racecourse.

Initially, Greyville was a middle-class and working class white area, populated by those who couldn't afford to live in the upper Berea, because of its lower altitude. Indians moved in, and by the 1930s, sections of Greyville were largely inhabited by Indians. The shops in the area were owned by shopkeepers of differing nationalities, and the area was cosmopolitan. Declared a slum, by the Slums Act, Greyville was declared off-limits to Indians by the Group Areas Act and parts ("Block AK") were demolished in the 1970s, subsequently being converted into shopping centres, and low-rise corporate offices. Block AK was subject to a substantial land claim by its former inhabitants.
