= Umbilo =

- Location within KwaZulu-Natal Location within South Africa
- Coordinates: 29°53′11″S 30°58′40″E
- Country: South Africa
- Province: KwaZulu-Natal
- Municipality: eThekwini
- Main Place: Durban

Area
  - Total: 3.01 km^{2} (1.16 sq mi)

Population (2001)
  - Total: 11,311
  - Density: 3,760/km^{2} (9,730/sq mi)

Racial makeup (2001)
  - Black African: 30.6%
  - Coloured: 4.8%
  - Indian/Asian: 8.3%
  - White: 56.3%

First languages (2001)
  - English: 64.4%
  - Zulu: 23.2%
  - Afrikaans: 6.4%
  - Xhosa: 3.0%
  - Other: 3.0%
- Time zone: UTC+2 (SAST)
- Postal code (street): 4001
- PO box: 4075
- Area code: 031

Umbilo is a central suburb of Durban, KwaZulu-Natal, South Africa, situated approximately 4 kilometres (2.5 mi) south-west of the city centre.

== Etymology ==
The name is taken from the Umbilo River that flows through Pinetown and Queensburgh via the Umbilo canal and eventually into Natal Bay at Bayhead. Also written as Mbilo, it is of Zulu origin, meaning "boiling".

== Healthcare ==
Victoria Mxenge Hospital (formerly King Edward VIII Hospital) is a tertiary level public hospital situated to the north of Umbilo along the R102 Sydney Road. The function of the hospital is to provide tertiary services, which are specialised services offered beyond district and regional hospitals, to the entirety of the KwaZulu-Natal Province and parts of the Eastern Cape.
