= Outer Ring Road, Durban =

Road in South Africa

Coordinates: 29.806°S 30.978°E

Durban Outer Ring Road

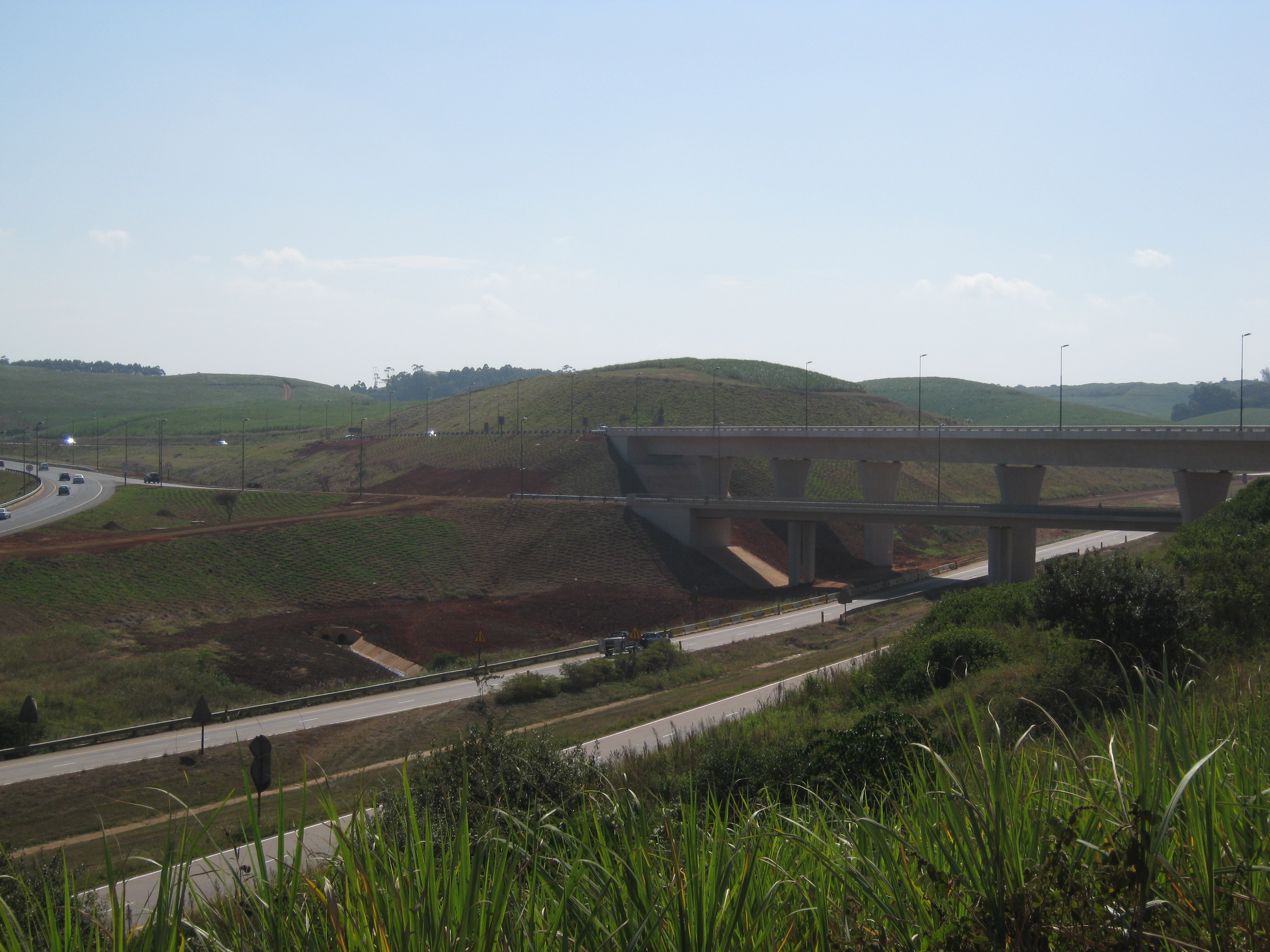

Route information
- Length: 32 km (20 mi)
- Existed: 2007–present

Major junctions
- Beltway around Durban
- North end: M41 in uMhlanga
- N3 in Durban
- South end: R102 / M4 in Durban South

Location
- Country: South Africa

Highway system
- Numbered routes of South Africa

The Durban Outer Ring Road is a half ring road that circles the coastal city of Durban, South Africa. It is part of the N2 highway which links the North and South Coasts of KwaZulu-Natal.

== Route ==
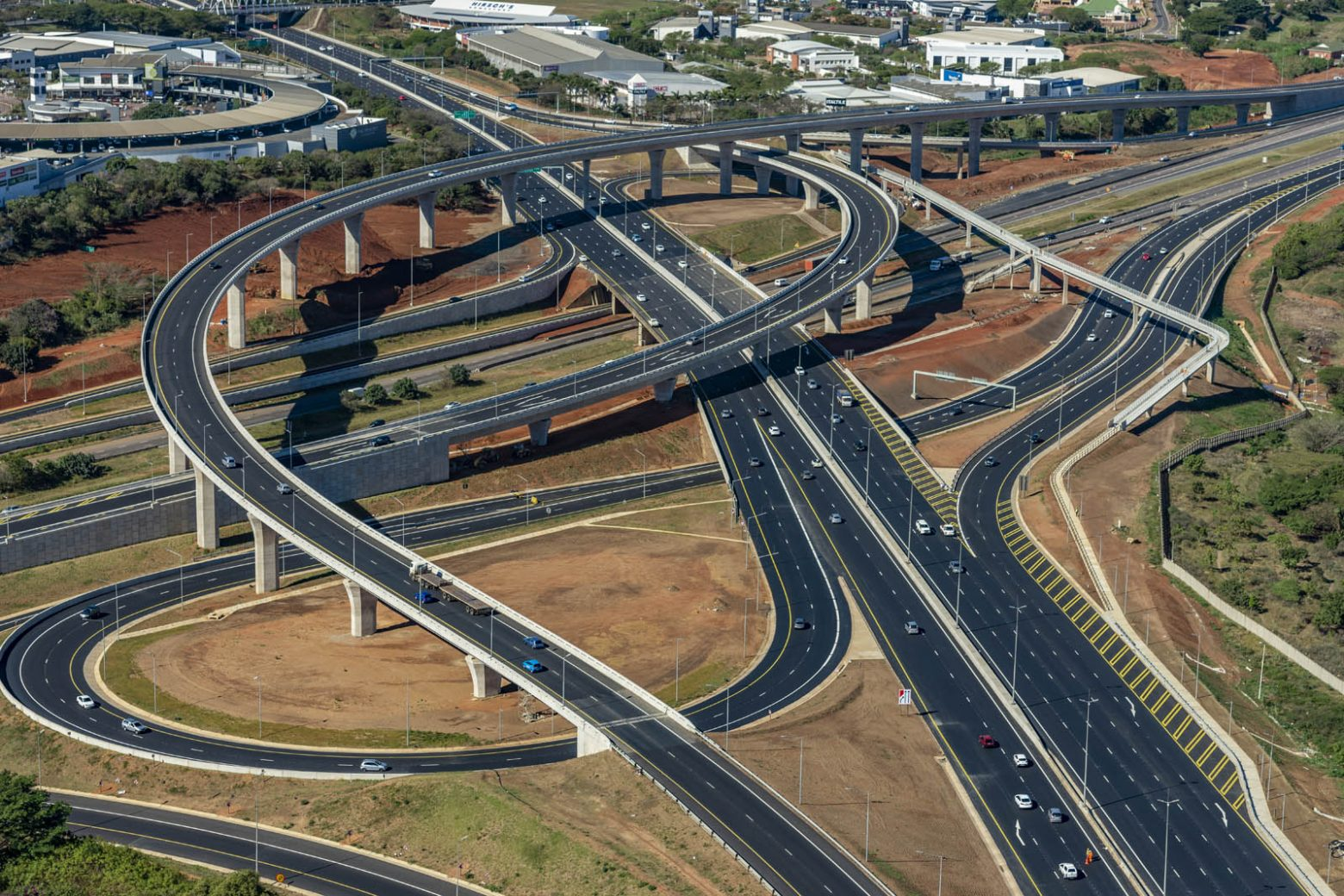
Newly upgraded Mount Edgecombe Interchange

From north to south, the Outer Ring Road begins from the M41 Mount Edgecombe Interchange between Mount Edgecombe and uMhlanga as 3×3 wide freeway. In late 2013 construction began to upgrade the M41 and N2 interchange to a full flowing interchange from its prior diamond interchange shape and was completed and opened on the 30 October 2018.

From the M41, the N2 then fans into a 4×4 wide freeway as it begins to circle the urban parts of Durban. The freeway passes M25 KwaMashu Highway, M45 Queen Nandi Road including a Petropoort (the only urban freeway petrol station in Durban) and continuing to the massive Umgeni Interchange. The interchange is a dual road interchange starting with M21 Inanda Road and linking to the M19 Umgeni Road.

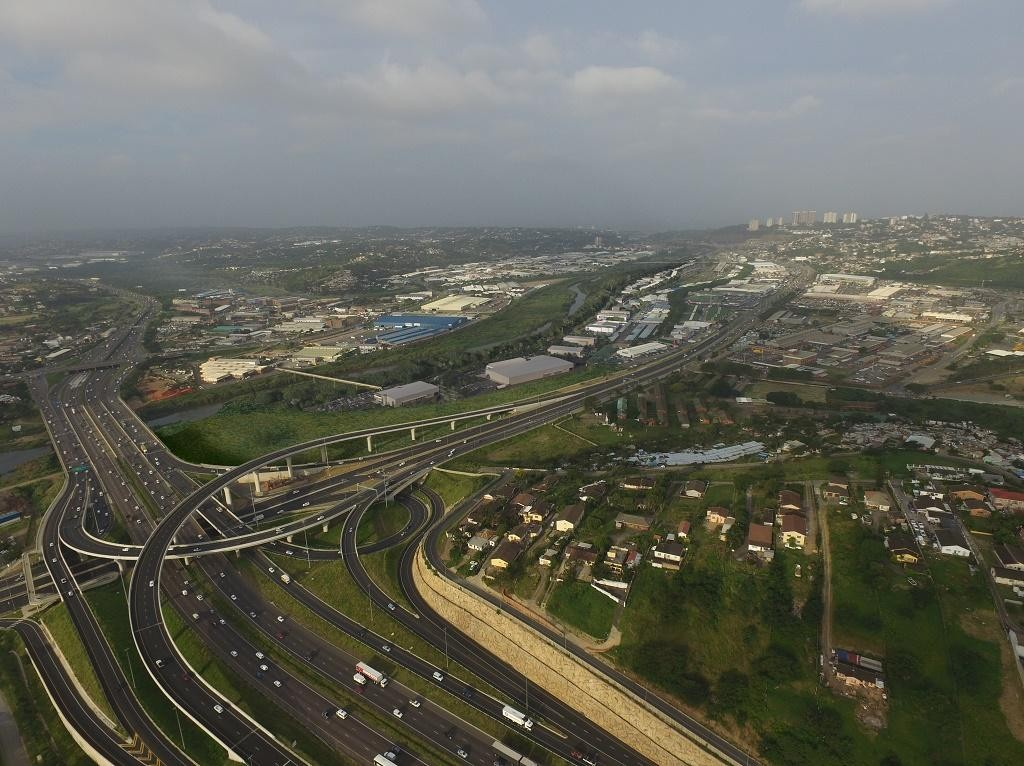
Newly upgraded Umgeni Interchange

In 2012, due to heavy congestions with the M19 Umgeni Road and the N2 SANRAL decided to upgrade the M19 interchange to a semi-free flowing interchange. The project was supposed to have reached completion in May 2014 but delays from local workers and striking has prolonged this, however it was completed and opened in October 2015. Two huge viaduct bridges have been erected for free-flowing traffic for commuters travelling on the M19 West to reach the N2 North, and for the N2 North to reach the M19 West without stopping at signals.

The N2 continues south to reach the EB Cloete Interchange with the N3 highway coming from Johannesburg. Nicknamed "Spaghetti Junction", this is the only five-stack free-flowing interchange in South Africa.

Once passing the interchange with the N3, the N2 continues into the southern parts of Durban meeting the terminus of the freeway portion of the M7 at the Solomon Mahlangu Drive Interchange and continuing southwards passing the M1 Higginson Highway. The N2 then meets the R102 for the Umlazi off-ramp and would continue with an old Durban International Airport offramp, however in 2010 the airport was relocated to the north of Durban. The off-ramp still exists but there is no signage or destination route.

The Durban Outer Ring Road ends at the Reunion Interchange with the M4, which provides an alternative route to the bypass for commuters who wish to drive through the central parts of the city. The M4 begins in Ballito and passes in a southerly direction along the coast as a parallel alternative to the N2 cutting through the city centre and ending at the N2 at the defunct Durban International Airport. After the M4 the N2 heads towards Amanzimtoti and Port Shepstone, the highway changes back to 2×2 lanes and over-head urban signage ends as the freeway makes its way to the South Coast.

== See also ==
- N2 (South Africa)
- Ring roads in South Africa
