= Marine Walk Shopping Centre =

Shopping centre in eMdloti, South Africa

- Interactive map of the Marine Walk Shopping Centre area
- Alternative names: Marine Walk

General information
- Location: eMdloti, South Africa, 4350, Salta Boulevard, Salta Sibaya
- Coordinates: 29.6635°S 31.1106°E
- Opening: 30 September 2022
- Owner: Devmco Group

Technical details
- Floor count: 2
- Floor area: 8,968

Design and construction
- Architecture firm: Craft of Architecture
- Main contractor: Construction ID

Other information
- Number of stores: 25

Website
- https://marinewalk.co.za/

Marine Walk Shopping Centre, simply known as Marine Walk, is a shopping centre situated in the Sibaya Coastal City, east of eMdloti, KwaZulu-Natal, South Africa and approximately 23 kilometres (14,3 mi) north-east of Durban.

Marine Walk, which opened its doors on 30 September 2022, is an open-air shopping centre with a 'boomerang' design which forms a central courtyard.

== Location ==
Marine Walk is situated on Salta Boulevard (accessible via the M27) in the Salta Sibaya Estate (located in the northern portion of the Sibaya Coastal City), bordering eMdloti to the east. Furthermore, it is situated between the M4 Leo Boyd Highway (to uMhlanga and Ballito) to the west and the M27 Jabu Ngcobo Drive (to eMdloti and Verulam) to the south directly adjacent to the M4/M27 interchange.

== Tenants ==
Anchor tenants in Marine Walk include Superspar (including Tops @ Spar), Dis-Chem, Woolworths Food and WEdit. Notably, the office space section of the shopping centre known as Innova Haus also houses the head offices for Devmco Group, Rainmaker Marketing, M3 Africa and EST Quantity Surveyors.
