= Sibaya Coastal City =

Mixed-use development in KwaZulu-Natal, South Africa

- Former names: Sibaya Coastal Precinct, Sibaya Precinct
- Alternative names: Sibaya

General information
- Location: eMdloti, KwaZulu-Natal, South Africa
- Coordinates: 29.664434°S 31.110932°E
- Inaugurated: 2016
- Owner: Tongaat Hulett Developments

Technical details
- Structural system: Mixed-use

The Sibaya Coastal City, previously known as the Sibaya Coastal Precinct and Sibaya Precinct, and simply known as Sibaya, is a mixed-use development situated in eMdloti, on the North Coast of KwaZulu-Natal, South Africa, approximately 23 kilometres (14,9 mi) north-east of Durban.

The Sibaya Coastal City will be developed in seven phases, commencing with nodes 1 and 5, located in the southern portion of the precinct between the M4 and the coastline. The blend of development rights for nodes 1 and 5 encompasses over 2 300 residential units and over 100 000 sqm of commercial space, along with hotel and resort utilisations.

== History ==
In 2015, Tongaat Hulett Developments released the first parcels of land, which was former sugarcane land owned by Tongaat Hulett, to developers and investors seeking to develop in the envisioned precinct.

The 1000-hectare mixed-use development was later officially launched in 2016, with its first residential development, OceanDune Sibaya launched by KZN-based development company, Devmco Group. In October 2018, the first residents of Sibaya officially took occupation of their new residences in OceanDune.

From 2016 onwards Sibaya Coastal Precinct has witnessed the introduction of several residential developments such as Signature Sibaya, Pebble Beach, Shoreline, Coral Point, Gold Coast Estate and Salta Sibaya Estate (includes Mt Cotton and Capri Village). The newest residential development in the precinct is Oasis Sibaya, launched in July 2024.

In 2020, it was announced that Sibaya would include a retail shopping centre which opened in October 2022 as the Marine Walk Shopping Centre. The shopping centre serves as a convenience and lifestyle centre for the residents of Sibaya and eMdloti as a whole.

In 2025, the precinct was recently rebranded from its former longer name, “Sibaya Coastal Precinct” to its current simplified name, “Sibaya Precinct”. In the same year, Porsche Centre South Africa, managed and owned by the OT Venter Group of Companies, also announced its plans to relocate its uMhlanga dealership to the Sibaya Precinct.

Moreover, on 21 June 2025, Solara, located on the south of the uMdloti river estuary opposite La Mercy, was officially launched as the last residential release within the Salta Sibaya Estate. On 20 November 2025, HQ Sibaya, the flagship commercial and office development in the Sibaya Precinct was launched, further strengthening Sibaya's commercial appeal to its established residential portfolio.

== Features ==
Currently, Sibaya Coastal City comprises three out of the seven planned nodes

=== Node 1 ===
- Coral Point
- OceanDune
- Pebble Beach
- Shoreline
- Signature

=== Node 5 ===
- Balize Private Estate
- Gold Coast Estate

=== Node 6 ===
- Salta Sibaya Estate
  - Capri Village
  - Marine Walk Shopping Centre
  - Mt Cotton
  - Serenity Salta
  - Solara Salta

== Location ==
Sibaya Coastal City is situated approximately:

- 6 kilometres (3.7 mi) north of uMhlanga
- 9 kilometres (5.6 mi) south-east of the King Shaka International Airport
- 20 kilometres (12.4 mi) south-east of Ballito
- 23 kilometres (14.3 mi) north-east of Durban

In addition, it is bounded by the uMdloti river estuary to the north, the oHlanga estuary to the south, M4 to the west and eMdloti to the east.

== Transport ==
=== Roads ===
Sibaya Coastal City is well-connected by the M4 and M27. The M4 (Leo Boyd Highway) connects uMhlanga and Durban to the south with Ballito to the north while the M27 (Jabu Ngcobo Drive) connects eMdloti to the east with Verulam to the west. Additionally, the M27 provides direct connectivity to the N2 freeway (connects King Shaka International Airport and KwaDukuza to the north with Durban to the south) at Exit 190.

=== Road access ===
Sibaya Coastal City can be accessed through the following main routes:

- Nodes 1 and 5 – Turning off the M4 onto Heleza Boulevard, the main roadway through the southern portion of Sibaya.
- Node 6 (Salta Sibaya Estate) – Turning off the M27 onto Salta Boulevard, the main roadway through Salta Sibaya.

== Growth ==
As a result of its strategic position on the fast-growing North Coast corridor between uMhlanga and Ballito, Sibaya Coastal City has experienced unprecedented growth since its launch in 2016. Sibaya also forms part of the envisioned “airport city” of the Durban Aerotropolis, stretching between uMhlanga and Ballito and encompassing the King Shaka International Airport.

In 2024, Lightstone Property, a South African property data and analytics firm, ranked Sibaya as the fourth most affluent suburb in South Africa based on data for property sales and total purchase prices in 2023 behind Bryanston (Sandton, Gauteng), Sea Point (Cape Town, Western Cape) and Midstream Estate (Centurion, Gauteng).

=== Road Infrastructure Developments ===
In June 2025, Devmco Group launched the next phase of its development alongside the Premier of KwaZulu-Natal (KZN), Thami Ntuli, KZN MEC for Economic Development, KZN Tourism and Environmental Affairs Reverend Musa Zondi, and eThekwini Mayor Cyril Xaba. A key feature is a new network for walking, cycling and golf carts, connecting Salta Sibaya to the coastal areas via an underpass beneath the M27, promoting a lifestyle less dependent on cars.

In September 2025, Devmco Group announced that it would fund and develop a comprehensive upgrade of the M27 and M4 in the Sibaya vicinity, in collaboration with the eThekwini Roads Authority (which will contribute R7.8 million towards the upgrades), KZN Transport Department and SANRAL. The upgrades include widening the M27 to six lanes, additional lanes and improved on- and off-ramps, new interchanges, modern traffic management systems, teardrop traffic circles at the N2 interchange, traffic lights at M4 interchanges, and improved access to Salta Boulevard. The project aims to reduce congestion, improve traffic flow and enhance road safety and accessibility to the rapidly growing precinct. Preliminary works include relocating underground services and completing Heleza Boulevard to the existing M27/Salta Boulevard intersection.

== Management ==
The Sibaya Precinct Master Management Association (SPMMA) is responsible for managing the public space in the Sibaya Coastal City on behalf of the SPMMA members and property owners, with the purpose of securing long-term measurable value for the members of the precinct.

== Conservation ==
The Sibaya Coastal City has been designed around its inherent natural elements in such a way that it will allow for 60% of the precinct to remain undeveloped green spaces to further preserve the laid-back atmosphere of neighbouring eMdloti.

The Sibaya Coastal Forest Reserve is a nature reserve comprising 350-hectare indigenous coastal dune forest south of the precinct stretching towards the Ohlanga estuary, about 2 kilometres south of Sibaya to include the existing Hawaan Forest.
