= Westbrook, South Africa =

Westbrook
- Village
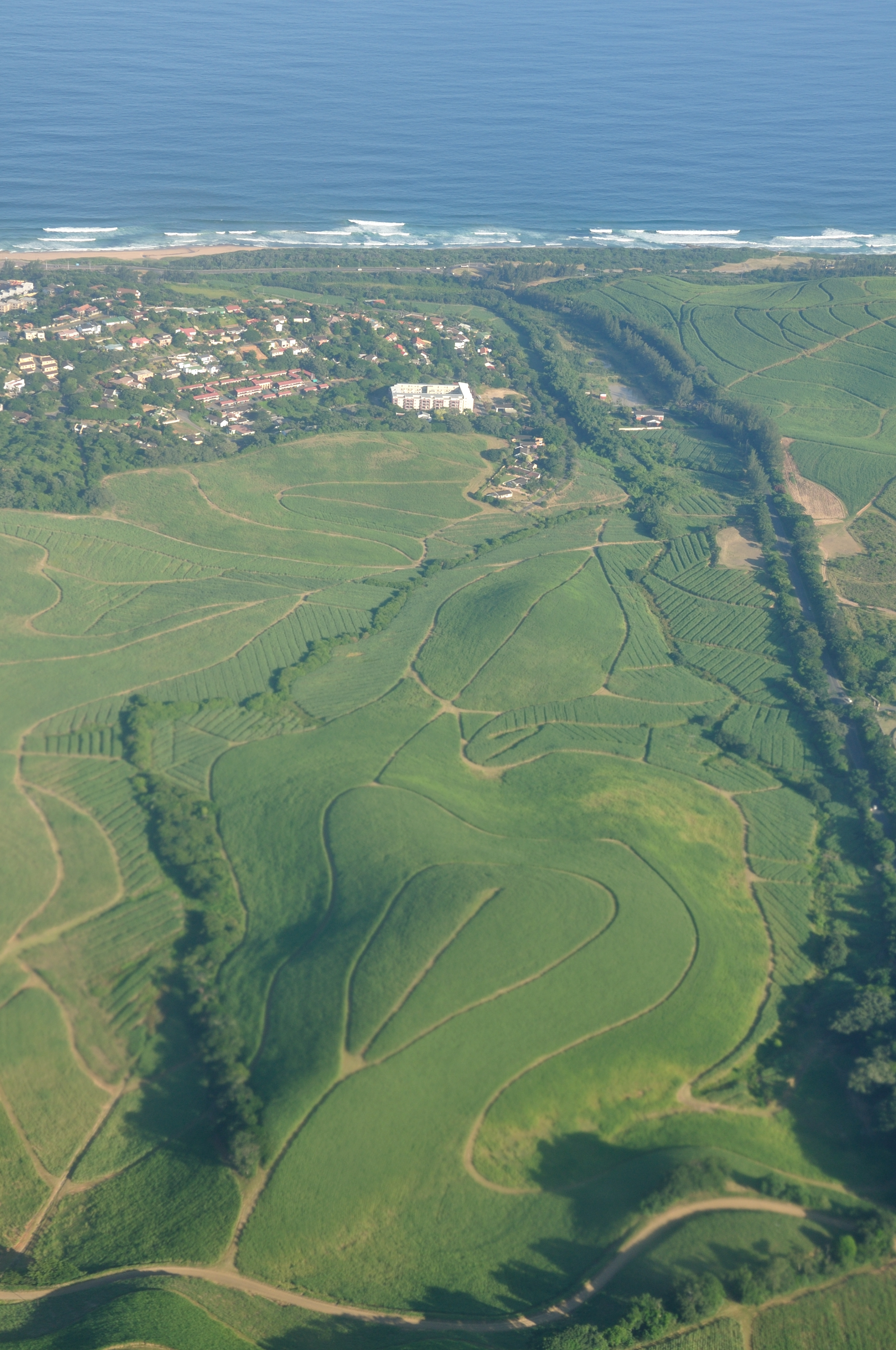
- A view of Westbrook with the ocean in the background

- Location within KwaZulu-Natal Location within South Africa
- Coordinates: 29°35′32″S 31°09′23″E
- Country: South Africa
- Province: KwaZulu-Natal
- Municipality: eThekwini

Area
  - Total: 1.58 km^{2} (0.61 sq mi)

Population (2011)
  - Total: 1,526
  - Density: 966/km^{2} (2,500/sq mi)

Racial makeup (2011)
  - Black African: 20.5%
  - Coloured: 2.9%
  - Indian/Asian: 30.3%
  - White: 46.0%
  - Other: 0.3%

First languages (2011)
  - English: 69.3%
  - Zulu: 14.1%
  - Afrikaans: 11.7%
  - Xhosa: 1.9%
  - Other: 3.0%
- Time zone: UTC+2 (SAST)
- Postal code (street): 4399
- PO box: 4406
- Area code: 032

Westbrook, also known as Westbrook Beach, is a coastal village on the North Coast of the KwaZulu-Natal province of South Africa, approximately 35 kilometres (22 mi) north-east of Durban and 7 kilometres (4 mi) east of oThongathi.

== Overview ==
Located just south of the uThongathi River, Westbrook is the northernmost coastal suburb of the eThekwini Metropolitan Municipality. This quiet, small coastal village is shaded by dense milkwood trees typical of the area and has very limited public facilities. The nearest urban centres are oThongathi (7 km), Ballito (10 km), and uMhlanga (19 km).

Although officially recognised as a separate area from oThongathi, Westbrook is often considered part of the Greater oThongathi area and shares the same postal code.

== Transport ==
Westbrook is located just off the tolled N2 freeway to the west, which connects KwaDukuza in the north with Durban in the south. The M43 (Ushukela Drive), which provides access to the N2 at exit 202, originates at the traffic circle with the M4, heading west toward oThongathi. In addition, the M4 (Leo Boyd Highway) runs through Westbrook, offering an untolled route north from uMhlanga to Ballito.
