= Meadowlands School of Technology =

Meadowlands technical high school

Information
- Type: Government
- Motto: "Avant Garde"
- Established: 20 January 1969
- Session: single
- Principal: S.V.Naidoo
- Website: school site

Meadowlands School of Technology is a government secondary school in Chatsworth a section of Durban. Chatsworth was created under the Apartheid period to house Durban residents of Indian heritage. The school specialises in technology.

== Description ==
Meadowland concentrates on technology and whilst it gives priority to local children and then who are of similar age to the pupils of the grade the admission policy also gives priority to those with an aptitude for technology.

== History ==
The school opened on 20 January 1969 with Mr.P.C.C.Nair as headmaster, he had over a thousand children to teach with very few teachers trained to teach at secondary level. In fact twenty of the teachers had no teaching experience and only enthusiasm, but they were required when just one year consisted of seventeen classes.
