= M12 (Durban) =

Metropolitan route in eThekwini, South Africa

Metropolitan route M12

Route information
- Maintained by eThekwini Metropolitan Municipality
- Length: 17 km (11 mi)

Major junctions
- North end: M4 in uMhlanga Rocks
- M41 in uMhlanga Ridge; M17 Sandile Thusi Road in Stamford Hill
- South end: M4 in Durban CBD

Location
- Country: South Africa
- Towns: uMhlanga and Durban

Highway system
- Numbered routes of South Africa
← M11	→ M13

The M12 is a major metropolitan route in the eThekwini Metropolitan Municipality in South Africa, beginning in uMhlanga Rocks and heading southwards through Durban North and Stamford Hill before ending just north of the Durban CBD.

== Route ==
The M12 begins at the M4 (Leo Boyd Highway) intersection in uMhlanga Rocks and initially heads southwest as uMhlanga Rocks Drive, ascending the ridge. It then turns left at the traffic circle in uMhlanga Ridge, continuing in a south-southwesterly direction before flying over the M41 freeway.

The route runs through La Lucia Ridge, followed by Somerset Park and La Lucia, passing between Somerset Park to the north and La Lucia to the south. At Sunningdale, it changes direction to head south, running between Sunningdale to the west and La Lucia to the east, before entering Durban through the suburb of Durban North.

In Durban North, it turns south-south-west again as it passes Virginia Bush Nature Reserve to reach a t-junction with Kenneth Kaunda Road. It turn left into Kenneth Kaunda Road and rounds to reach an intersection with Swapo Road (which offers access into Central Durban North). It continues south-south-westwards and then south-south-eastwards after the intersection with Portland Place, slightly curving up the suburb of Athlone (southern suburb of Durban North) to reach Avon Crescent. It continues south-south-eastwards to fly over the M21 and leave Durban North, crossing over the uMngeni River as the Athlone Bridge.

After crossing the uMngeni River, it enters the suburb of Stamford Hill and turns south-south-westwards to reach a junction with Athlone Drive. It now becomes Masabalala Yengwa Avenue and continues to pass Windsor Park Golf Course to the right and Durban Country Club to the left to reach a junction with Smiso Nkwanyana Road. It continues in a south-south-easterly direction, passing the Durban Country Club to the left, turning in a southerly direction and then in a south-south-westerly direction as it passes Moses Mabhida Stadium and Kings Park Stadium to the right.

After meeting Battery Beach Road, it proceeds to pass under the exit to the M17 (Sandile Thusi Road) and intersects Somtseu Road, with the Mr Price Head Office to right. It continues in a south-south-easterly direction passing the Durban Railway Station to the right and ends shortly after at another junction with the M4 (KE Masinga Road) on the northern boundary of the Durban city centre.
