= Priven Reddy =

South African technology entrepreneur

- Born: Durban, South Africa
- Education: BSc in Computer Science
- Occupation: Entrepreneur
- Years active: 2000s–present
- Known for: Founding Kagiso Interactive, Dryvar, EON Aerospace, VEU, Ararkis Automobili and CodeBlaze AI

Priven Reddy is a South African entrepreneur and technology executive based in Dubai, United Arab Emirates. He is the founder of several companies operating in software development, mobility, aviation technology, artificial intelligence, and high-performance electric vehicles, including Kagiso Interactive, Dryvar, EON Aerospace, VEU, Ararkis Automobili and CodeBlaze AI.

Reddy has been widely profiled in South African media as a self-made businessman who rose from poverty to leading multinational technology ventures.

== Early life and education ==
Reddy was born and raised in Chatsworth, Durban, where he grew up in a low-income household. He has stated in multiple interviews that he began working from a young age, including selling cardboard boxes to recyclers and managing his primary school's tuck shop as a way to earn pocket money.

After completing high school, Reddy worked a series of low-wage jobs — including as a security guard and restaurant waiter — before deciding to teach himself computer skills. Following what he described as a negative experience while working in hospitality, he began studying web design and development independently and worked as a freelance developer.

He later obtained a bachelor's degree in computer science, specialising in augmented-reality (AR) and virtual-reality (VR) systems.

== Career ==
=== Kagiso Interactive and early ventures ===
Reddy founded Kagiso Interactive in the 2000s as his first major company. The firm developed mobile applications, custom enterprise software, and digital platforms for South African clients. Media profiles credit Kagiso Interactive with establishing Reddy's early reputation in software development.

Reddy was also a director of STTOQ Technology Holdings Ltd (company number 13703264), a United Kingdom-registered company that was dissolved on 11 April 2023.

=== Expansion into aviation and advanced technologies ===
In 2021, Reddy founded EON Aerospace (also referenced as Leap Aerospace), a venture focused on developing supersonic transport concepts and high-speed aviation technologies.

=== Artificial intelligence and software development ===
Reddy later launched VEU, an artificial-intelligence and custom-software development company, operating across enterprise solutions, automation technologies, and AI-driven platforms.

In 2025, he launched CodeBlaze AI, an AI-based coding platform aimed at simplifying application development and enabling code-free software creation. He is also listed in the Estonian business register as a board member of Kryptoro Holdings OÜ (registry code 14684605), which has reported no turnover.

=== Ararkis Automobili and the Sandstorm hypercar ===
Reddy is also the founder of Ararkis Automobili, an electric-vehicle company focusing on high-performance hypercars.

In 2024, the company unveiled the conceptual Ararkis Sandstorm, which media outlets described as an electric hypercar with extreme acceleration figures and a highly limited production run. Reports indicated that the company intended to produce just twenty units. The United Kingdom-registered entity behind the venture, Ararkis Automobili Ltd (company number 15408695), was dissolved on 14 July 2026. Companies House records also show that identity verification for Reddy as a director of the company, required by 25 January 2026, was not completed.
