= Chatsworth, KwaZulu-Natal =

Chatsworth umhlatuzana Suburb
- Location within KwaZulu-Natal Location within South Africa
- Coordinates: 29.910°S 30.885°E
- Country: South Africa
- Province: KwaZulu-Natal
- Municipality: eThekwini

Government

Area
  - Total: 42.73 km^{2} (16.50 sq mi)

Population (2011)
  - Total: 196,580
  - Density: 4,601/km^{2} (11,920/sq mi)

Racial makeup (2011)
  - Black African: 38.2%
  - Coloured: 1.2%
  - Indian/Asian: 60.0%
  - White: 0.1%
  - Other: 0.5%

First languages (2011)
  - English: 62.6%
  - Zulu: 26.2%
  - Xhosa: 5.7%
  - Sotho: 1.3%
  - Hindi: 4.2%
- Time zone: UTC+2 (SAST)
- Postal code (street): 4092
- PO box: 4030
- Area code: 031
- Website: www.durban.gov.za

Chatsworth is a large Suburb [former township] in KwaZulu-Natal, South Africa established in the 1950s to segregate the Indian population and create a buffer between the white suburbs of Durban to the north and the black townships of Durban to the south. Located in the Southern Durban basin and roughly bordered by the Umhlatuzana River in the North and Umlaas River in the South, the suburb is made up mainly of Indian/Asian and Black African people. Umhlatuzane is part of Chatsworth.

== Overview ==
Indian people in Chatsworth are from various religious groups. Many masjids, temples, and churches are present. One of many famous masjids is Habibia Manzil in Shallcross. Due to its history, Chatsworth still has a predominantly Indian population. It is a centre of Indian culture and holds the Temple of Understanding – a Hindu temple. Many Indians from Hindi, Tamil and Telugu backgrounds are present. Such Indian languages are still spoken at home in many instances, with learning classes set up to aid in their development.

This area has developed into a fully-fledged post-apartheid suburb of the Durban eThekwini Municipality.

Prior to December 1st 2023, vehicle registration plates in Chatsworth started with "ZN" - "N" for Natal & "Z" for (Kwa)"Zulu".

== History ==
In the 1940s, the Pegging Acts and the Asiatic Land Tenure and Indian Representation Act, 1946 were passed. These acts gave the government the right to remove and destroy shacks and small self-made shelters, with the putative intention of improving sanitary conditions. This led to the Group Areas Act of June 1950 being enforced directly by the Government, in which certain residential areas were designated for Whites, Indians, Coloureds, and Blacks only. Indians were removed from areas such as Mayville, Cato Manor, Clairwood, Magazine Barracks, Bluff, Riverside, Prospect Hall, Duikerfontein, and Sea Cow Lake. They were forcibly moved into the two townships of Phoenix, situated North of Durban, and Chatsworth to the South.

During the late 1940s and early 1950s, there were advertisements in papers for an exclusively Indian town, Umhlatuzana. This progressed into the greater Chatsworth District in the early 1960s when planning commenced and official movements took place in 1964 to the eleven units: Unit 1, 2, 3, 5, 6, 7, 8, 9, 10, and Unit 11. Modern-day Chatsworth is spread over seven municipal wards which all fall roughly in the South Central Municipal area. The intentional buffer design of Chatsworth creates today an interesting melting pot of people frequenting Chatsworth's business district which comprises a bustling centre, The Chatsworth Center.

== Infrastructure ==
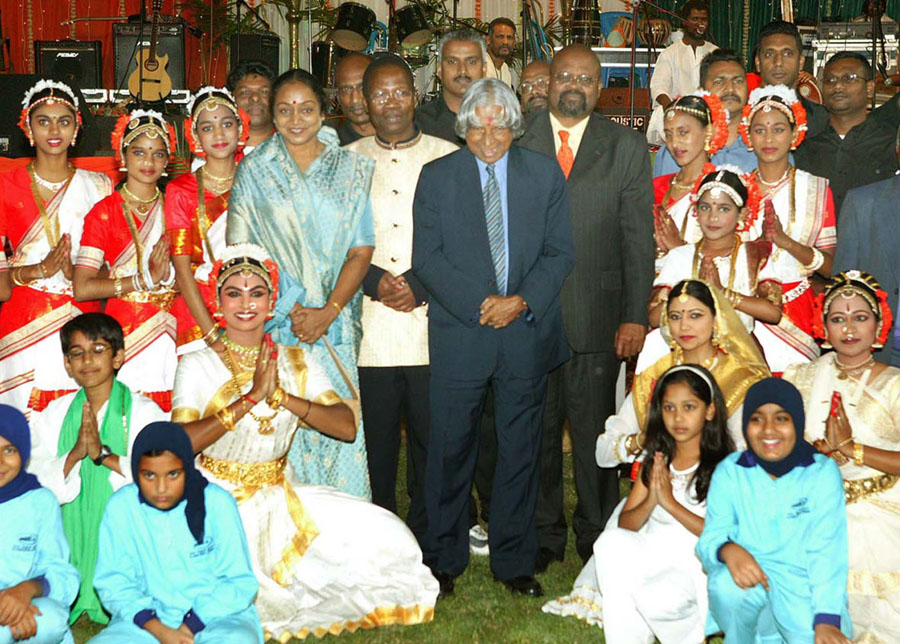
A. P. J. Abdul Kalam visits Chatsworth Stadium in 2004

Chatsworth Had seen most of its development from 1960- to 1980 due to the Group Areas Act, which segregated people based on race. This saw the construction of the entire town from the ground up.

Major infrastructure includes all the roads, and railways. The M1 Higginson Highway runs through the town from Mobeni in the East to Mariannhill in the West. It serves as the artery of Chatsworth linking all 11 Units and surrounding areas.

Alongside the highway is a railroad operated by PRASA (Chatsworth Line), linking some units of Chatsworth directly to areas of Durban South (Merebank, Clairwood, Rossburgh) and the Durban CBD.

The most recent private development is the construction of the Ridge Shopping mall, in Shallcross.

== Nelson Mandela Community Youth Centre ==
The development of the Chatsworth Youth Center was initialized by former president Nelson Mandela, following the deaths of several teenagers at the Throb Nightclub. It serves as a multi purpose facility for youth to engage on societal issues.

== Notable landmarks ==
- Al Ameen Masjid
- Aryan Benevolent Home
- Bangladesh Market (Oldest market in Chatsworth)
- Chatsworth center
- Chatsworth Stadium
- Christian Revival Centre.
- Gandhi Centenary Park
- Lord Hanuman Statue, Shri Vishnu Temple (Tallest in Africa)
- Magazine Barracks Temple
- R.K. Khan Hospital.
- Resurrected Dance Crew(RDC) & Academy(RDA)
- Silverglen Nature Reserve
- Sri Sri Radha Radhanath Temple (Hare Krishna Temple)
- Mission For Christ

== Education ==
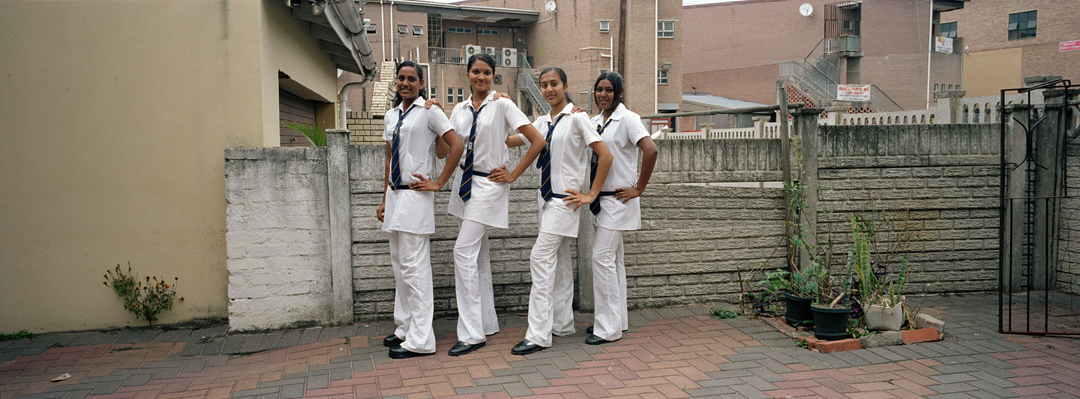
School girls in Chatsworth

South Africa's Indian population, culturally has emphasised education during times when Apartheid Laws prevented the intellectual and material development of non-white races, believing only whites were capable of enquiry of the mathematic and scientific fields. As a result of resistance, the Indian population has excelled academically and has produced many academics who are former inhabitants of Chatsworth. Most secondary schools in Chatsworth boast pass rates above 90 per cent for the Matric Examinations despite lacking resources and facilities. Arena Park Secondary School, Apollo Secondary School, Crossmoor Secondary School, Southlands Secondary School and Kharwastan Secondary School regularly produce learners that are placed in the provincial Top 30. Arena Park Secondary School, Crossmoor Secondary School, Southlands Secondary School and Kharwastan Secondary School regularly have matric pass rates of 90% to 100%, with Crossmoor Secondary School and Arena Park Secondary School generally ranking high in the Umlazi district.

=== Public Secondary Schools ===
- Apollo Secondary School, Collier Avenue, Umhlatuzana Township
- Arena Park Secondary School, Rose Heights Drive, Arena Park
- Asoka Secondary School, Skyridge Circle, Moorton
- Brindhaven Secondary School, Road No 706, Montford
- Chatsworth Secondary School, Lenny Naidu Drive (Pelican Drive), Bayview
- Crossmoor Secondary School, Golden Poppy Crescent, Crossmoor
- Glenover Secondary School, Glenover Rd, Westcliff
- Kharwastan Secondary School, Iris Avenue, Kharwastan
- Marklands Secondary School, Himalaya Drive, Shallcross
- Meadowlands School of Technology, Road 734, Montford
- Montarena Secondary School, Road 706, Montford
- Newhaven Secondary School, Croftdene Road, Croftdene
- Protea Secondary School, Road 257, Bayview
- Risecliff Secondary School, Blue Jill Crescent, Risecliff
- Shallcross Secondary School, Alpine Drive, Shallcross
- Southlands Secondary School, Havenside Drive, Havenside
- Welbedene Secondary School, Road 749, Montford
- Westcliff Secondary School, Florence Nightingale Drive, Westcliff
- Wingen Heights Secondary School, Wingen Walk, Shallcross
- Witteklip Secondary School, Witteklip Street, Croftdene
- Woodhurst Secondary School, Woodhurst Drive, Woodhurst

=== Police training Academy ===
- SAPS Academy Chatsworth.

== See also ==
- African Wanderers F.C.
