= Muzi Yeni =

South African horsee racing jockey (born 1986)

Personal information
- Born: 6 December 1986 (age 39) Claremont, Durban
- Occupation: Jockey

Horse racing career
- Sport: Horse racing
- Career wins: 1788* (as of 24 May 2021)

Major racing wins
- President’s Champions Challenge (2011); Champions Cup (2012); Allan Robertson (2014); Thekwini Stakes (2015); SA Classic (2018); Premier's Champions Challenge (2018); SA Triple Tiara (2021); WILGERBOSDRIFT SA OAKS (2021); H F OPPENHEIMER HORSE CHESTNUT STAKES (Grade 1) (2021)

Significant horses
- Happy Landing, Master Plan, Alboran Sea, Lauderdale, Lobo’s Legend, Coral Fever, War of Athena, Gotthegreenlight
- Updated on 29 April 2012

Muzi Yeni (born 6 December 1986) is a South African thoroughbred horse racing jockey. To date he has won Numerous Grade 1 races, with 1788 career wins (as off 24 May 2021).

He finished second in the 2018/19 SA Jockey Championship riding 215 winners, narrowly losing by 3 wins, to Lyle Hewitson.

Yeni won his first race in the 12th start of his career. He rode Storm King to victory for Mike de Kock at Clairwood in November 2003.

Yeni's first Grade 1 victory came in the President's Champions Challenge over 2000m at Turffontein in April 2011. He rode Happy Landing to victory, which was a big outsider at 55/1.

Muzi Yeni won the Grade 2 Peermont Emperors Palace Charity Mile at Turffontein Racecourse in November 2018. Yeni rode Coral Fever to victory, winning R150,000 for his charity, Khangezile Primary School.

== Early career ==
Yeni was educated at Hunt Road Secondary, before earning his matric at the South African Jockey Academy.

As an apprentice he rode 75 winners. In the 2007/08 season, his first as a fully fledged jockey out of the academy, he rode 36 winners. The following season he rode 57, and 97 in the 2009/10 season. He then broke into the top 10 in the 2010/2011 season, finishing third on the national log with 133 winners.

== National honours ==
Muzi Yeni rode for Team SA for the first time in the International Jockeys’ Challenge in 2010, where he subsequently won the Turffontein leg.

He represented Team SA in Premier Gateway Challenge in Singapore in September 2018.
