= Queensburgh =

- Town
- Location within KwaZulu-Natal Location within South Africa
- Coordinates: 29°52′S 30°56′E
- Country: South Africa
- Province: KwaZulu-Natal
- Municipality: eThekwini

Area
  - Total: 22.88 km^{2} (8.83 sq mi)

Population (2011)
  - Total: 54,846
  - Density: 2,397/km^{2} (6,209/sq mi)

Racial makeup (2011)
  - Black African: 23.8%
  - Coloured: 1.6%
  - Indian/Asian: 53.8%
  - White: 20.2%
  - Other: 0.6%

First languages (2011)
  - English: 70.0%
  - Zulu: 14.3%
  - Afrikaans: 7.5%
  - Xhosa: 4.3%
  - Other: 4.0%
- Time zone: UTC+2 (SAST)
- Postal code (street): 4093
- PO box: 4070

Queensburgh (/ˈkwiːnsbərə/) is a town in KwaZulu-Natal, South Africa that is situated inland (southwest) from Durban and now forms part of eThekwini, the Greater Durban metropolitan area.

== History ==
The hilly area was settled by people working in Durban who wanted to escape the humidity of the coastal city. In 1924, four residential townships in the area, Malvern, Escombe, Northdene and Moseley (now forms part of Pinetown) combined to form the town of Malvern. In 1952, to celebrate Queen Elizabeth II's accession to the throne, Malvern received municipality status and changed its name to Queensburgh.

== Geography ==
Queensburgh is situated approximately 9 kilometres (6 mi) south-west of the Durban CBD, with much of the town situated between the uMbilo River to the north and the uMhlatuzana River to the south. Its neighbouring towns/cities include Pinetown to the west, Westville to the north-east, Durban to the east and Chatsworth to the south.

=== Suburban areas ===
Queensburgh is a collective name for several smaller suburbs located on the rolling hills south-west of Durban, primarily comprising Northdene, Malvern, and Escombe. The 2011 census divided the main place of Queensburgh into eight “sub places” including:

- Buffels Bosch
- Burlington Greenfields
- Escombe
- Malvern
- Northdene
- Queensmead Industrial
- Shallcross
- Shallcross Ext 2

== Transport ==
=== Rail ===
Metrorail operates commuter trains on two lines that pass through Queensburgh: the Old Main Line in the centre and the New Main Line to the south. The Old Main Line, which connects Durban and Pietermaritzburg, has stations at Northdene, Escombe, Malvern, and Poet’s Corner. The New Main Line, the newer railway line between Durban and Pietermaritzburg, includes stations at Shallcross, Burlington, and Cavendish.

=== Roads ===
The M7, also known as Solomon Mahlangu Drive (formerly Edwin Swales VC Drive), is the main freeway running through Queensburgh, extending from the Bluff (in Durban) in the east to Pinetown in the north-west, while also providing access to the N3 and N2 freeways. The M5 (Main Road), serves as the main local artery connecting Queensburgh north to Pinetown and east to Bellair in Durban. Additionally, the M10 (Stella Road), provides an alternative route east towards Bellair.

== Demographics ==
Queensburgh has a diverse population. The suburb has a significant Indian population who moved to the area from neighbouring townships after apartheid had ended.

English is the dominant language followed by Zulu, Afrikaans and Xhosa.
