= M5 (Durban) =

Metropolitan route in eThekwini, South Africa

Metropolitan route M5

Route information
- Maintained by the eThekwini Metropolitan Municipality
- Length: 38 km (24 mi)

Major junctions
- North end: R102 / M25 in KwaMashu
- M45 in KwaMashu; M21 in Newlands East M32 in New Germany; M19 in New Germany; M31 in Pinetown; M13 in Pinetown M34 in Queensburgh; M7 in Queensburgh; M10 in Queensburgh; M10 in Bellair; M7 in Rossburgh
- South end: R102 in Umbilo, Durban

Location
- Country: South Africa

Highway system
- Numbered routes of South Africa
| ← M4 | → M7 |

The M5 is a long metropolitan route in the eThekwini Metropolitan Municipality, South Africa. It starts in KwaMashu in the north-western townships of Durban. It passes through the townships of Newlands East, Newlands West, Ntuzuma and KwaDabeka. It then passes through the industrial town of New Germany and the leafy towns of Pinetown and Queensburgh before entering Durban and ending in the Umbilo industrial area.

== Route ==
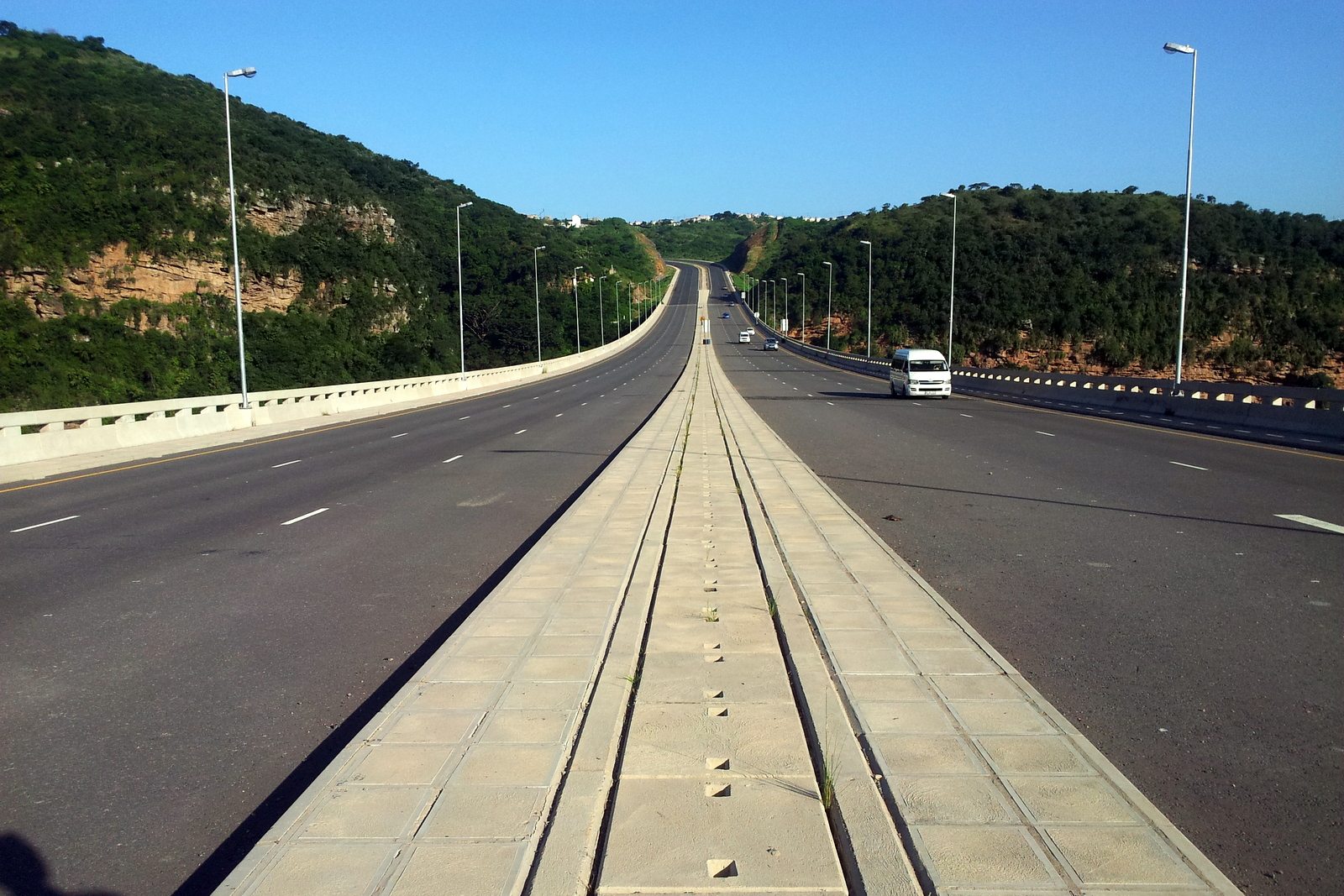
The new M5 Dumisani Makhaye Drive crossing the uMngeni River

The northern terminus of the M5 is a junction with the M25 (to Inanda) and R102 (to Durban and Phoenix) in the Duffs Road suburb of KwaMashu. It heads south-west as a dual-carriageway roadway named Dumisani Makhaye Drive and forms an intersection with the M45 Queen Nandi Drive. Turning west, it passes the townships of KwaMashu and Newlands East. Here it intersects with the M21 Inanda Road and proceeds to head west-southwest between the townships of KwaMashu, Ntuzuma and Newlands West where it gains freeway status with the first off-ramp being the 'Newlands Expressway'. Just after Newlands Expressway, it turns north-west and temporarily stops being a freeway as it enters KwaDabeka by crossing the uMngeni River. Here, it intersects 'Ulwandle Drive' and thereafter regains freeway status, turning south-west through KwaDabeka. The M5 has 2 off-ramps for the remaining length of its freeway section which include 'Wyebank Road' and '1st Avenue'. After the 1st Avenue off-ramp, The M5 becomes Dinkelman Road, turning south towards New Germany and ends as a freeway at the M32 Posselt Road junction.

After the Posselt Road intersection, it becomes Otto Volek Road, passing through the industrial town of New Germany before crossing over the M19 freeway which connects to Pinetown CBD and Westville at the exit 14 off-ramp south of New Germany. After the M19 intersection, the M5 enters Pinetown and intersects with the M31 Josiah Gumede Road just east of the CBD, where the M5 becomes Stapleton Road. Proceeding south-south-west, it passes under the M13 freeway which connects to Westville at the exit 16 off-ramp in the Sarnia suburb of Pinetown. It turns left at a T-junction to become Underwood Road, heading south-east to fly over the N3 freeway. After the Baker Road intersection, it becomes Main Road and turns south-south-east, passing through the Moseley suburb of Pinetown.

It crosses the M7 freeway, which connects to Pinetown CBD and Durban, at the exit 12 off-ramp south of Moseley and enters Queensburgh at its Northdene suburb and turns east-south-east. As it traverses Queensburgh, the road serves as the main arterial through the suburbs of Escombe and Malvern.

It enters Durban through the suburb of Hillary as Sarnia Road at its intersection with Arundel Road. Shortly thereafter, it intersects with the M10 Stella Road (to Queensburgh), with which it becomes co-signed eastwards. The co-signed road flies over the N2 freeway to enter Bellair, turning north-east and splitting from the M10 before turning south-east and entering Sea View. It then turns north-east to pass over the M7 again at an off-ramp in Rossburgh before continuing north-northeast through Umbilo Industrial. It ends at an intersection with the R102 Umbilo Road, which connects to the Durban city centre and Isipingo.

== New Dumisani Makhaye Drive ==
The Dumisani Makhaye Drive (also known as P577 or MR577/Main Road 577) section of the M5 was opened on 2 December 2017 by former president Jacob Zuma for public use. The R1.3 billion project was the biggest road infrastructure development in South Africa since 2012 and also the most complex road project to be undertaken in years. It formed part of government's nationwide programme to upgrade infrastructure.

Dumisani Makhaye Drive spans the uMngeni River and provides a strategic link between Duffs Road in KwaMashu and Dinkelman Road in New Germany. Significantly, the road serves as a new alternative route to the King Shaka International Airport for traffic coming from the Pietermaritzburg and Pinetown areas, which eases traffic congestion on the EB Cloete Interchange (Spaghetti Junction). It also cuts off 16 kilometres for traffic using the N3 to connect to the N2, makes the communities of Newlands, KwaMashu, Inanda, KwaDabeka, Clermont and Pinetown more closely connected and helped eradicate the legacy of apartheid-based spatial planning. The road is named after the late struggle hero, Dumisani Makhaye, who dedicated his life to the fight against apartheid.
