= Mobeni =

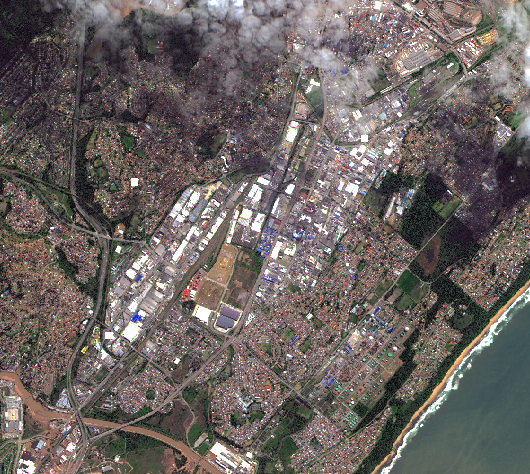

- Location within KwaZulu-Natal Location within South Africa
- Coordinates: 29.9480°S 30.9525°E
- Country: South Africa
- Province: KwaZulu-Natal
- Municipality: eThekwini
- Main Place: Durban

Government

Area
  - Total: 7.77 km^{2} (3.00 sq mi)

Population (2011)
  - Total: 10 833
  - Density: 1.3/km^{2} (3.3/sq mi)

Racial makeup (2011)
  - Black African: 78.9%
  - Coloured: 1.7%
  - Indian/Asian: 18.2%
  - White: 0.9%
  - Other: 0.3%

First languages (2011)
  - Zulu: 49.0%
  - English: 22.8%
  - Xhosa: 12.3%
  - Other: 15.9%
- Time zone: UTC+2 (SAST)
- Postal code (street): 4052 (Mobeni)/4092 (Mobeni Heights)
- PO box: 4060

Mobeni is a suburb of Durban in KwaZulu-Natal, South Africa and forms part of the heavily industrialised South Durban Basin, a sub-region south of Durban.

== Subdivisions ==
Mobeni is a collective of three suburbs that lie between Chatsworth and the Bluff, namely the industrial suburbs of Mobeni East and Mobeni West and the residential suburb of Mobeni Heights. Mobeni Heights lies west of the N2 along the M1 towards Chatsworth. Mobeni West lies between the N2 and R102 and Mobeni East lies between the M4 and Jacobs (part of the Bluff).

== Location ==
Mobeni is located approximately 9 kilometres (5.6 mi) south-west of the Durban CBD, bordered by Clairwood to the north, the Bluff to the east, Reunion (part of Umlazi) to the south, Chatsworth to the south-west and Woodlands and Montclair to the west.

== Transport ==
=== Roads ===
It is positioned in a strategic corridor between the N2 and M4 highways. The N2 to the west connects KwaDukuza in the north with Port Shepstone in the south, while the M4 to the east provides a direct route between the Durban CBD in the north-east and Umlazi (via the M30) and Isipingo (via the R102) in the south-west. The R102 (South Coast Road) forms Mobeni's main arterial spine, connecting Rossburgh and Umbilo in the north-east with Umlazi and Isipingo to the south-west.

== Clairwood Hospital ==
Clairwood Hospital was opened on 1 May 1956, in converted army barracks. It is located at 1 Higginson Highway, Mobeni, and serves residents of the following nearby suburbs as well as Mobeni:

- Lamontville
- Merebank
- Woodlands
- Montclair
- Woodhaven
- Yellowwood Park
- Clairwood
