= M45 (Durban) =

Metropolitan route in eThekwini, South Africa

Metropolitan route M45

Route information
- Maintained by the eThekwini Metropolitan Municipality
- Length: 6.8 km (4.2 mi)

Major junctions
- East end: R102 in Briardene
- N2 in Newlands East
- East end: M21 in KwaMashu

Location
- Country: South Africa
- Towns: KwaMashu, Newlands East, Durban

Highway system
- Numbered routes of South Africa
← M43	→ M46

The M45 also named Queen Nandi Drive is a short metropolitan route in the eThekwini Metropolitan Municipality, South Africa. The road connects Briardene in Durban North to KwaMashu.

== History ==
The eThekwini Metropolitan Municipality decided to construct a new link road, the Queen Nandi Drive between the R102 North Coast Rd and KwaMashu. A joint venture partnership between eThekwini and Tongaat Hulett to develop and sell the sites was formed in June 2000, and construction on the Queen Nandi Drive along with the Interchange on the N2 commenced in 2002.

== Route ==
The M45 begins at the intersection with the R102 (Chris Hani Rd) in Briardene and curves through hills in a north-westerly direction for the entire route. It passes through Kenville before entering Newlands East at Riverhorse Valley and crossing the N2 highway at the exit 174 off-ramp.

It continues through the western side of Riverhorse Valley and curving through the remainder of Newlands East. It intersects with the M5 (Dumisani Makhaye Drive) before entering KwaMashu and ending at the intersection with the M21 (Malendela Road).
