= M25 (Durban) =

Metropolitan route in eThekwini, South Africa

Metropolitan route M25

Route information
- Maintained by eThekwini Metropolitan Municipality
- Length: 20 km (12 mi)

Major junctions
- South-east end: R102 / M5 in KwaMashu
- M21 in KwaMashu
- North-west end: M27 near Mawothi and Inanda

Location
- Country: South Africa

Highway system
- Numbered routes of South Africa
← M22	→ M26

The M25 is a metropolitan route in the eThekwini Metropolitan Municipality, South Africa linking the R102 in KwaMashu to Inanda, north-west of Durban. The M25 serves as one of the most important commuter routes in the Greater Durban region, connecting two of its largest townships to Durban (via the R102).

== Route ==
Also known as the Curnick Ndlovu Highway, after activist Curnick Ndlovu, and previously known as the KwaMashu Highway, the M25 begins as a double-carriageway freeway from its interchange with the R102 (to the N2 and Durban) and M5 (to KwaDabeka and New Germany) in the Duffs Road suburb of KwaMashu.

It runs in a northwesterly direction bordering between KwaMashu in the south and Phoenix in the north and passes over the interchanges at the M21 Malendela Road, Bhejane Road and Ntuzuma Road before ending its status as a freeway.

It enters Inanda and traverses the township before turning right at a traffic circle on its far eastern side, heading north. Beyond the traffic circle, the M25 becomes Mafukuzela Highway, winding through the hills of Inanda before leaving the township and entering the eastern part of Mawothi. It terminates at an intersection with the M27 Jabu Ngcobo Drive, which connects to Verulam, and Mawezulu Road, which leads to Osindweni.

The Bhejane Road interchange construction resulted in an engineering award for eThekwini Municipality.
