= Woodlands, Durban =

- Location within KwaZulu-Natal Location within South Africa
- Coordinates: 29°55′39″S 30°57′24″E
- Country: South Africa
- Province: KwaZulu-Natal
- Municipality: eThekwini
- Main Place: Durban

Area
  - Total: 1.80 km^{2} (0.69 sq mi)

Population (2011)
  - Total: 5,765
  - Density: 3,200/km^{2} (8,300/sq mi)

Racial makeup (2011)
  - Black African: 58.7%
  - Coloured: 4.2%
  - Indian/Asian: 9.7%
  - White: 26.7%
  - Other: 0.7%

First languages (2011)
  - Zulu: 43.1%
  - English: 41.3%
  - Afrikaans: 5.5%
  - Xhosa: 4.5%
  - Other: 5.6%
- Time zone: UTC+2 (SAST)

Woodlands is a southern suburb of Durban, KwaZulu-Natal, South Africa. It lies just south of Montclair and borders Mobeni East.
