= EMdloti =

eMdloti Umdloti
- Village
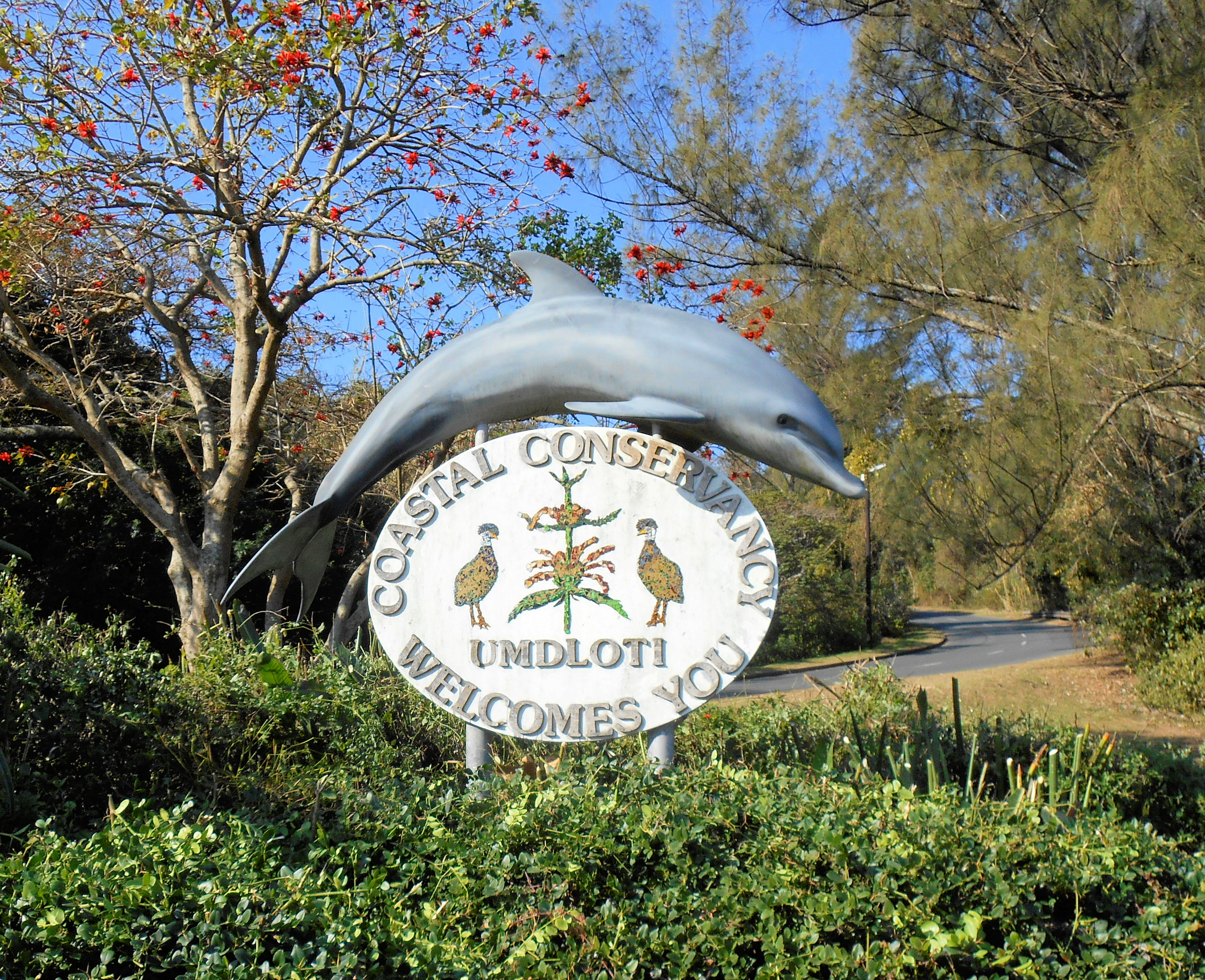
- Entrance to eMdloti/Umdloti

- Location within KwaZulu-Natal Location within South Africa
- Coordinates: 29°40′S 31°07′E
- Country: South Africa
- Province: KwaZulu-Natal
- Municipality: eThekwini

Area
  - Total: 1.59 km^{2} (0.61 sq mi)

Population (2011)
  - Total: 1,778
  - Density: 1,120/km^{2} (2,900/sq mi)

Racial makeup (2011)
  - Black African: 12.3%
  - Coloured: 2.2%
  - Indian/Asian: 8.5%
  - White: 76.7%
  - Other: 0.3%

First languages (2011)
  - English: 72.7%
  - Afrikaans: 14.3%
  - Zulu: 7.1%
  - Xhosa: 1.7%
  - Other: 4.2%
- Time zone: UTC+2 (SAST)
- Postal code (street): 4319
- PO box: 4350

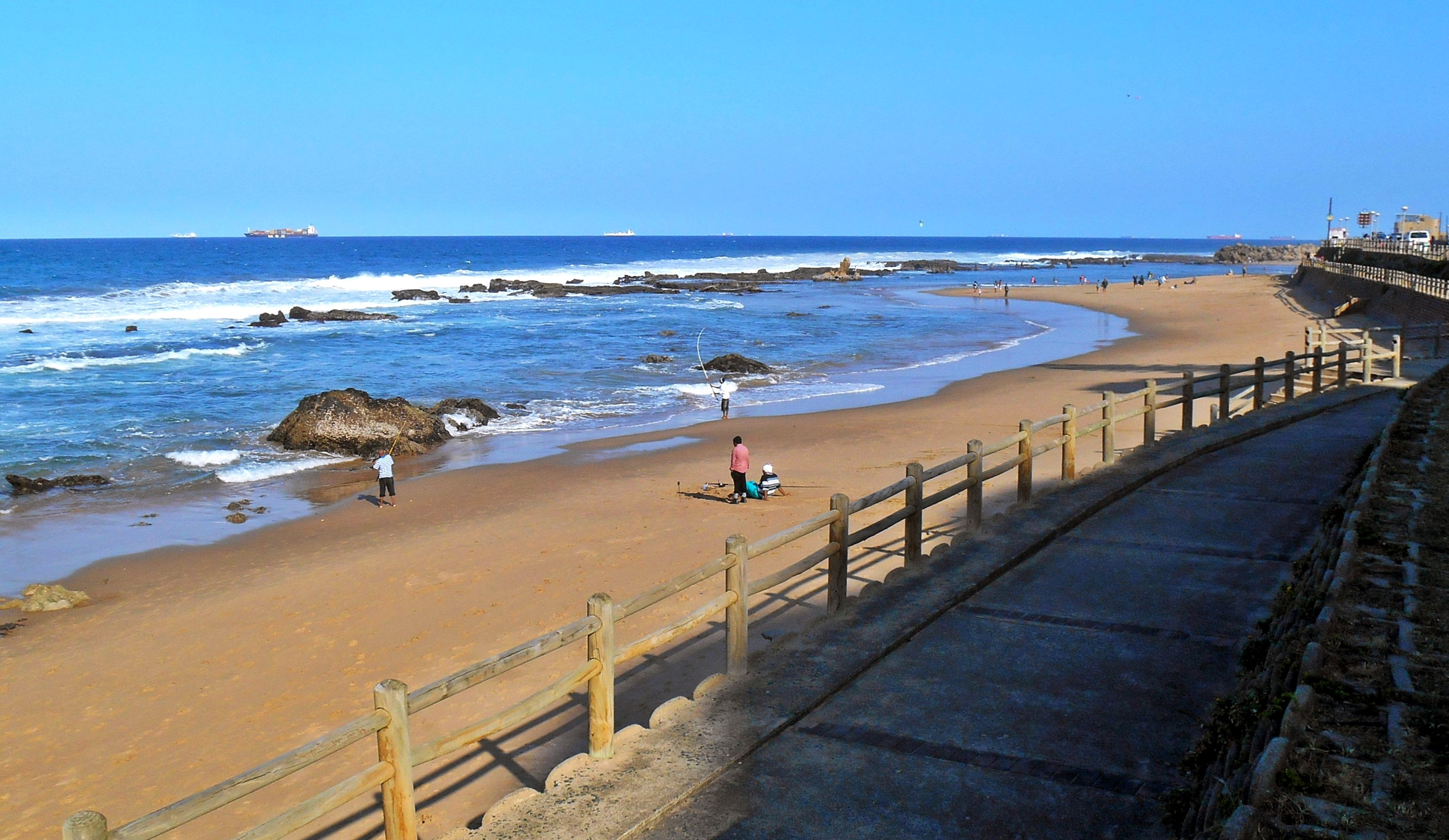
Beach at eMdloti

eMdloti, alternatively rendered Umdloti and also known as Umdloti Beach, is a small resort village situated along the KwaZulu-Natal North Coast, South Africa. It lies at the mouth of the Mdloti River approximately 24 km north-east (14,9 mi) of Durban and 11 km (6.8 mi) north-east of uMhlanga and now forms part of eThekwini, the Greater Durban Metropolitan Municipality.

The name Mdloti is the Zulu word for a species of wild tobacco that grows here.

== Spelling change ==
In November 2009, the eThekwini Metropolitan Municipality submitted a list of places in the municipality to the KwaZulu-Natal Provincial Geographic Names Committee to be changed from their anglicised names to the correct Zulu spelling. In the list, the village "Umdloti" was to be changed to "eMdloti" which meant the uppercase "U" would fall away and be replaced by a lowercase "e" and the Umdloti River was to be changed to "uMdloti River" which meant the '"U" in the spelling would change from an uppercase to a lowercase.

On 1 October 2010, the KwaZulu-Natal Department of Arts and Culture gazette the list of approved name changes which included the village of Umdloti and the Umdloti River. Ever since the name change, the South African National Roads Agency Ltd. (SANRAL) has changed the road signs on the N2 highway leading to and at the M27 Jabu Ngcobo Drive interchange and many news agencies like The Mercury and Northglen News use the spelling "eMdloti", however there are still several road signs that still remain with the spelling "Umdloti" and many Durbanites and residents and businesses of eMdloti still spell the town with its previous spelling.

== Geography ==
eMdloti is situated on a large, ancient sand dune that divides the village into upper and lower sections along the coastline. The village borders on the uMdloti River to the north, with La Mercy on the opposite bank, the Sibaya Coastal Forest Reserve to the south and the Sibaya Coastal City to the west. Nearby communities include uMhlanga to the south-west as well as Waterloo and Verulam to the west.

== Lifestyle ==
Situated just ten kilometers north of uMhlanga Rocks, eMdloti is a town near Sibaya Coastal Forest Reserve. eMdloti features two commercial centres, a post office, and several restaurants, while a natural rock pool by the beach provides a safe swimming area.

eMdloti has a permanent population of around 3,000 people but can increase by as much as tenfold during the Christmas and Easter holiday season. Due to eMdloti's single access road (M27) from the M4/N2 interchanges, the topography, the fact that North and South Beach Roads are both cul-de-sacs and limited public parking, the repercussions of the seasonal holidaymaker influx results in traffic congestion and frequent gridlock, mainly at year-end.

eMdloti is famous for dolphins that swim very close to the beach early morning and July to November is a good time for whale watching when whales are often spotted from the beach.

eMdloti's real estate consists of full title, free-standing homes, mainly on the South Beach and sectional title apartments, located mostly on North Beach. Much of the latter is owned by non-residents as holiday homes or rental properties.

== Developments ==
The Sibaya Coastal City is a development located above eMdloti, to the west of the village, and is led by Tongaat Hulett Developments. Once part of the Bellamont Estate sugarcane plantation, the land is now being transformed into a mixed-use area with luxury apartments, offices, retail space, and residences.

The development includes the well-established Sibaya Casino and Entertainment Kingdom, owned by Sun International, one of South Africa's largest resort hotel and casino chains, located to the south-west of eMdloti.

== Retail ==
eMdloti is mainly served by the Marine Walk Shopping Centre in the Sibaya Coastal City, opened in October 2022. The shopping centre is anchored by Superspar, Woolworths and Dis-Chem, complemented by a variety of restaurants and other stores.

However, due to the small size of the shopping centre the variety of goods sold is limited, and for larger shopping trips, residents need to make the short journey to nearby uMhlanga.

== Infrastructure ==
=== Roads ===
eMdloti is accessed by one road, the M27 (Jabu Ngcobo Drive), which begins at the traffic circle on South Beach and heads west toward Verulam. The M27 connects to both the N2 (leading to Durban and King Shaka International Airport) and the M4 (leading to uMhlanga and Ballito), making eMdloti easily reachable from either freeway.

== 2022 floods ==
During April 2022, an unusual amount of heavy rainfall struck caused by the La Niña effect struck the eThekwini/Dolphin Coast/Ndwedwe/Umdoni Coast region and eMdloti was one of the worst effect areas of the deadly natural disaster. Several apartment buildings and residences in eMdloti were damaged due to landslides that occurred in the area as a result of the heavy rainfall.

This was largely due to two factors, the geographical location of eMdloti and the neighbouring Salta Sibaya development. eMdloti is located on ancient high/steep sand dunes which have a high clay component therefore making the area susceptible to mass movements like solifluction or landslides. At the same time, residents allegedly claimed the neighbouring development of Salta Sibaya part of the greater Sibaya Coastal City development which sits on top of the dune/hill is to blame for the extensive damage that occurred in eMdloti during heavy rainfalls.
