= M27 (Durban) =

Metropolitan route in eThekwini, South Africa

Metropolitan route M27

Route information
- Maintained by eThekwini Metropolitan Municipality
- Length: 23 km (14 mi)

Major junctions
- West end: M25 near Inanda
- R102 in Verulam; N2 near eMdloti; M4 near eMdloti
- East end: North/South Beach Road in eMdloti

Location
- Country: South Africa
- Towns: Buffelsdraai, Redcliffe, Verulam, eMdloti

Highway system
- Numbered routes of South Africa
| ← M26 | → M29 |

The M27 also known as Jabu Ngcobo Drive or Old Inanda Road is a metropolitan route in the eThekwini Metropolitan Municipality, South Africa linking Inanda to Verulam and eMdloti, north of Durban.

== Route ==
The M27 begins at the intersection with the M25 (Mafukuzela Highway) and Mazwezulu Road just outside Inanda. It runs eastward towards the coast, passing through sugarcane fields and the rural areas of Buffelsdraai and Redcliffe before reaching Verulam.

It then intersects the R102 (Gopalall Hurbans Road) south of Verulam's CBD, then turns right onto Ireland Street, continuing through Verulam and the nearby township of Waterloo. The route meanders through rolling sugarcane plantations fields, intersects the N2 highway (to King Shaka International Airport, KwaDukuza and Durban) at Exit 190 and shortly after meets the M4 highway (Leo Boyd Highway). Finally, it passes the Sibaya Coastal City and terminates at the traffic circle with North/South Beach Road in eMdloti.

== History ==
In 2008, it was proposed that the road be named after Jabu Ngcobo, who worked with the ANC. The eThekwiki Municipality assumed maintenance of the road from the KZN Department of Transport in 2017, following driver concerns that the road was not properly maintained. In 2019, there were more concerns expressed about the number of potholes on the road and the lack of response from the KZN Department of Transport. In 2021, a resident expressed concerns that streetlights on Jabu Ngcobo Road not working were contributing to crime in the area.
