= Silverglen Nature Reserve =

Protected area in South Africa

- Location within KwaZulu-Natal
- Location: Chatsworth, South Africa
- Coordinates: 29.9316013°S 30.8923483°E
- Area: 460 ha (1,100 acres)
- Governing body: eThekwini Municipality

Silverglen Nature Reserve is a 460 hectare conservancy on the Umlaas River located aside the suburb of Silverglen, Chatsworth, KwaZulu-Natal in South Africa. The reserve is the largest piece of coastal grassland and bush clump mosaic in Greater Durban, and is home to the first medicinal plant nursery in Africa, established in 1986.

== Fauna and flora ==
Silverglen Nature Reserve has the highest number of tree and bird species of any of the nature reserves in Durban. Over 280 grassland plant species, and over 35 grass species are naturally occurring in the reserve. Of the 120 tree species in the reserve, notable specimens include the forest milkberry, red beech, forest bushwillow and the silver oak. The reserve attracts a number of bird species, including the Narina trogon, green malkoha, and Burchell's coucal.

== Crime and land invasions ==
The nature reserve was closed to the public during the 1990s due to violent crime, but was reopened in 2017. In 2018, residents from the nearby Umlazi township began illegally demarcating land in the reserve for settlement in what has been named a land invasion. The eThekwini Municipality has since erected a fence around the reserve to prevent further attempts at land grabs, and following the discovery of a body in the reserve, an entrance was shut down by authorities. In March 2021 two municipal game rangers on patrol were killed by unknown gunmen. Following the discovery of another body in the reserve in April 2021, two men were arrested for murder.
