= Clairwood =

Coordinates: 29°54′S 30°59′E

- Country: South Africa
- Province: KwaZulu-Natal
- Municipality: eThekwini
- Main Place: Durban

Area
  - Total: 2.76 km^{2} (1.07 sq mi)

Population (2011)
  - Total: 3,717
  - Density: 1,350/km^{2} (3,490/sq mi)

Racial makeup (2011)
  - Black African: 56.51%
  - Indian/Asian: 39.54%
  - Coloured: 2.74%
  - White: 0.48%
  - Other: 0.73%

First languages (2011)
  - English: 47.51%
  - Zulu: 24.11%
  - Xhosa: 18.11%
  - Other: 4.20%
  - Afrikaans: 1.45%
- Time zone: UTC+2 (SAST)
- Postal code (street): 4052
- PO box: 4157

Clairwood is a southern suburb of Durban, KwaZulu-Natal, South Africa. It lies east of Montclair and west of Bluff. Historically, its population has comprised largely Indian South Africans, although that has changed in recent years. In 2011, the population was 3,717.

== History ==
=== Growth ===
When Natal was a British colony (1843–1910), Clairwood developed as a cultural enclave for Indian settlers, brought in predominantly as indentured labour, on the southern edge of Durban. The white settlers were not happy with Indians living in residential areas of Durban, and there was informal segregation. The government allocated certain areas, including Clairwood, Mayville, Cato Manor, Magazine Barracks, and the Bluff. In 1922, Durban municipality was empowered to prevent Indians from buying any municipal land.

By the mid-20th century Clairwood was flourishing, but declined during the apartheid years (1948-1994). Clairwood and its fringes became a growing and soon densely-populated informal residential area, in which all facilities were built by the community. Linked by a common language and religion, as well as reliance on the system of extended family, the residents formed an intricate network of kinship and other relationships, which provided a moral and social framework for developing their suburb. Regarded as an alien temporary group, the Indians were not accepted into the social fabric of the white settlers and were subjugated by them, especially during the apartheid era. A 1944 survey reporting on overcrowding and housing for Indians reported a population of 7,659 Indian people occupying 763 houses in the Clairwood area - the most densely populated in Durban. There was an obvious lack of basic amenities, including roads, pavements, kerbs, and gutters, compared with the adjoining White suburb of Montclair. "Clairwood South" was a shanty town slum, in which more than 3,000 families lived, in which taps were only installed after an outbreak of typhoid – 18 taps for 295 shanties, each of which paid £1.5.0 annually for the water. Many residents of the area became involved in the 1946 Passive Resistance Campaign, to protest a series of three ordinances passed by the government which restricted the rights of Indian South Africans to own or occupy land, and offering only limited, segregated political representation.

The 1950 Group Areas Act displaced thousands of Indians and Africans from their homes and livelihoods, moving them from many of the abovementioned areas. An exclusively Indian suburb called Umhlatuzana was declared.

The old Municipality of Durban wanted to create industries in the area, among the residents' homes, so development proceeded, leaving only a small area remaining as fully residential. By the 1990s, the environment had been physically degraded, but it retained aspects of its former thriving society, and around 1994 underwent revitalisation under the auspices of the municipality.

=== Clairwood Racecourse ===
The former Clairwood Racecourse was located adjacent to what is now Basil February Road in Mobeni East, where Clairwood Logistic Park was built. Clairwood Racecourse, a horse racing track, was established by Jack Hollis (later mayor of Durban) as a proprietary race club, owned by shareholders. It was built on reclaimed swampland in the South Durban Basin, and opened in 1921. It was also known as the Garden Course and was once known as Hollis Park.

In 1982 the course was upgraded after being bought from the shareholders by the Natal Racecourse Development Fund in the 1970s. The most valuable race at Clairwood was the Rising Sun Gold Challenge, run over 7 furlongs and 210 yards each June. In 1999 it was acquired by Gold Circle. In 2012 Clairwood Racecourse was acquired by Capital Property Fund for ZAR430 million, and leased back to Gold Circle for two years. It finally closed after the last race was run on 2 August 2014. Existing races were transferred to Greyville Racecourse, also owned by Gold Circle, and the existing site was renamed Clairwood Logistics Park. In a 2020 poll conducted by Sporting Post, readers voted Clairwood the best South African racecourse ever.

== 2011 census ==
In the 2011 Census, the population total was 3,717 people. They were predominantly Black African (56.51%), while people of Indian or other Asian ethnicity made up 39.54% of the population.

== Today ==
Clairwood has an area of 2.76 km^{2} (1.07 sq mi). It lies east of Montclair and west of Bluff.

As of 2026 the Clairwood Ratepayers and Residents' Association represents the residents.

== Facilities and attractions ==
Clairwood High School, also known as Clairwood Secondary School, is in Clairwood.

Clairwood Hospital is in the adjoining suburb of Mobeni. It was opened in 1956 on the site of former army barracks.

The Clairwood Shree Siva Soobramoniar Temple, a Hindu temple, is located in the suburb.

The St Louis Roman Catholic Church is at 22 Jacobs Road. It is of historic importance, having been founded in 1886, the original building including a school for Coloured and Indian students. The present building was constructed soon after 1911, and was declared a national monument under the former National Monuments Council legislation on 10 February 1989.

A major Muslim festival called Mohurram is held each year in Clairwood, to commemorate the martyrdom of Imam Hussein, who was killed in battle. In the early days, when there was unity in the Indian community, even Hindus participated in the festival.

== Notable people ==
Ebrahim Ismail Ebrahim (1937–2021) attended Clairwood High School. He was an anti-apartheid activist who became a member of the ANC's armed wing uMkhonto we Sizwe, was imprisoned on Robben Island, and was later an MP in the post-apartheid government in 1994.

Human rights lawyer and 2026 Nobel Peace Prize recipient Navi Pillay (born 1941) grew up in Clairwood. The community helped to pay for her education.

Politician Amichand Rajbansi (1942–2011), aka "the Bengal Tiger", was born in Clairwood.

Anglican bishop and anti-apartheid activist Rubin Phillip, the first Indian South African to hold the position of Bishop of Natal, grew up in Clairwood.

Roy Padayachie (1950–2012), activist and politician, was born and grew up in Clairwood.
