= M4 (Durban) =

Metropolitan route in eThekwini, South Africa

Metropolitan route M4

Route information
- Maintained by eThekwini Metropolitan Municipality
- Length: 60.5 km (37.6 mi)

Major junctions
- South end: N2 / R102 near Umlazi
- M7 near Clairwood; R102 in Durban CBD; N3 / M13 in Durban CBD; M15 in Durban CBD; R102 in Durban CBD; M12 in Durban CBD; M17 near Durban CBD; M21 near Durban North; M41 in uMhlanga Rocks; M12 in uMhlanga Rocks; M27 near eMdloti M43 in Westbrook; N2 near Ballito
- North end: R102 near Ballito

Location
- Country: South Africa
- Towns: Durban, uMhlanga, eMdloti, La Mercy, Desainager, Tongaat Beach, Genazzano, Westbrook, Ballito

Highway system
- Numbered routes of South Africa
← M1	→ M5

The M4 is a north–south metropolitan route in the eThekwini Metropolitan Municipality and partially in the KwaDukuza Local Municipality, South Africa. It runs from the N2 at the defunct Durban International Airport to Ballito via the Durban Central Business District (CBD) and uMhlanga. The sections between the airport and the southern edge of the CBD, and between the northern edge of the CBD and the exit to uMhlanga are classified as freeway. On the section from the southern edge of the CBD (where the freeway ends) to the Bram Fischer Street/Soldier's Way junction, the M4 is cosigned with the R102.

== Route ==
The M4 begins at the Reunion Interchange with the N2 (Durban Outer Ring Road) and the R102 adjacent to the old Durban International Airport and AFB Durban (just east of Umlazi). It begins by going north-north-east for 12 kilometres as the Inkosi Albert Luthuli Highway (formerly Southern Freeway), parallel to the R102 and the Metrorail tracks, to reach the Durban Central Business District near the Port of Durban, where it stops being a highway and makes a left and a right turn to join the R102 and be co-signed with it through the city centre.

While co-signed with the R102, it is Julius Nyerere Avenue northwards and Market Road southwards (one-way streets). Upon meeting the M13 (King Dinizulu Road) underneath the N3 highway on the western side of the CBD, the M4/R102 turn eastwards and become Johannes Nkosi Street eastwards and David Webster Street westwards (one-way streets).

At the Umgeni Road junction, the R102 becomes Umgeni Road northwards while the M4 remains facing eastwards (still one-way streets; KE Masinga Road eastwards and Bram Fischer Road westwards). Just after meeting the M12 by the Kingsmead Stadium, the M4 turns northwards to become Stalwart Simelane Street. The route heads north for 40 kilometres, becoming Ruth First Highway (formerly Northern Freeway) after the M17 intersection. It bypasses the Moses Mabhida Stadium and passes through Durban North (where Virginia Airport is located). Here, it becomes Leo Boyd Highway as it exits Durban and enters uMhlanga. In uMhlanga, the highway runs through the suburbs of La Lucia and uMhlanga Rocks, intersecting with the M41, which leads to uMhlanga Ridge and Mount Edgecombe. Beyond uMhlanga, the highway skirts the Sibaya Coastal City and the coastal village of eMdloti, continuing through the coastal villages of La Mercy, Desainager, Tongaat Beach, Genazzano, and Westbrook.

After Westbrook, it crosses the uThongathi River, exiting the eThekwini Metropolitan Municipality and reaches Ballito, where it makes a left turn onto Ballito Drive and meets the N2 highway again. It ends shortly thereafter at another junction with the R102 near Compensation.

== Junctions ==
Municipality	Location	km	mi	Exit	Destinations	Notes
Inkosi Albert Luthuli Highway (formerly Southern Freeway)
eThekwini	Umlazi	0	0	(151-152)	R102 South Coast Road, Umlazi, N2 Durban Outer Ring Road, KwaDukuza, Port Shepstone, Service Road	
eThekwini	Mobeni	0	0	9	Himalayas Road, Merewent, Lamontville, Mobeni	Signed as exits 8/9 northbound
eThekwini	Mobeni	0	0	8	Basil February Road, Merewent, Jacobs	Southbound exit, northbound entrance
eThekwini	Mobeni	0	0	7	Quality Street, Jacobs, Mobeni	
eThekwini	Clairwood	0	0	6	Jacobs Road, Blamey Road, Montclair, Clairwood	
eThekwini	Clairwood	0	0	5	R102 South Coast Road, M7 Solomon Mahlangu Drive, Bluff, Queensburgh	Signed as exits 4/5 northbound
eThekwini	Clairwood	0	0	4	M7 Solomon Mahlangu Drive east, Bluff	Southbound exit, northbound entrance
eThekwini	Durban Central	0	0	3	Margaret Mncadi Avenue, Durban Central	Northbound exit, southbound entrance
eThekwini	Durban Central	0	0	2	Che Guevara Road, Berea	Northbound exit, southbound entrance
Surface street section
eThekwini	Durban Central	0	0	—	R102 Julius Nyerere Avenue, Market Road south, Berea, Durban Central	At-grade intersection; Southern end of concurrency with R102
eThekwini	Durban Central	0	0	—	M13 King Dinuzulu Road, Berea	At-grade intersection
eThekwini	Durban Central	0	0	(1)	N3 west, Pinetown, Pietermaritzburg	Westbound exit, eastbound entrance
eThekwini	Durban Central	0	0	—	R102 Ingcuce Road, Umgeni Road north, Greyville, Windermere	At-grade intersection; Northern end of concurrency with R102
eThekwini	Durban Central	0	0	—	M12 Masabalala Yengwa Avenue, Stamford Hill	At-grade intersection
eThekwini	Stamford Hill	0	0	—	M17 Sandile Thusi Road, North Beach, Windermere	At-grade intersection
Ruth First Highway (formerly Northern Freeway) & Leo Boyd Highway
eThekwini	Stamford Hill	0	0	—	Isaiah Ntshangase Road, Stadium District, Stamford Hill	Northbound exit and entrance
eThekwini	Stamford Hill	0	0	2	Athlone Drive, Blue Lagoon	
eThekwini	Athlone	0	0	3	M21 Riverside Road, Prospect Hall Road, Waterkant Road	
eThekwini	Durban North	0	0	4	Swapo Road, Fairway, Durban North	
eThekwini	Durban North	0	0	5	Virginia Circle, Virginia, Virginia Airport	
eThekwini	Durban North	0	0	—	Aubrey Drive, Glenashley	Northbound exit and entrance
eThekwini	Durban North	0	0	—	Ann Abor Road, Umhlanga Rocks	Southbound exit and entrance
eThekwini	La Lucia	0	0	—	Armstrong Avenue, La Lucia	Northbound exit and entrance
eThekwini	La Lucia	0	0	—	Ridge Road, Armstrong Avenue, La Lucia	Southbound exit and entrance
eThekwini	uMhlanga	0	0	—	M41, Umhlanga Ridge, Mt. Edgecombe, King Shaka International	Northbound exit, southbound entrance
eThekwini	uMhlanga	0	0	—	M12 Umhlanga Rocks Drive, Lighthouse Road, Umhlanga Rocks, Umhlanga Ridge	
eThekwini	uMhlanga	0	0	—	Portland Drive, Herrwood Park, Umhlanga Rocks	Northbound exit, southbound entrance
eThekwini	eMdloti	0	0	—	Sibaya Drive, Heleza Boulevard, Sibaya Coastal City	At-grade traffic circle
eThekwini	eMdloti	0	0	—	M27, eMdloti, Verulam, N2, King Shaka International	
eThekwini	La Mercy	0	0	—	South Beach Road, La Mercy	
eThekwini	La Mercy	0	0	—	South Beach Road, Park Avenue, Desainager	At-grade traffic circle
eThekwini	Westbrook	0	0	—	M43 Ushukela Drive, Westbrook	At-grade traffic circle
eThekwini	Westbrook	0	0	—	North Beach Road, Westbrook Beach	At-grade traffic circle
eThekwini	Ballito	0	0	—	R627 Zimbali Drive, Zimbali Estate	At-grade traffic circle; Southern end of concurrency with R627
eThekwini	Ballito	0	0	(210)	N2, KwaDukuza, Durban	Northern end of concurrency with R627
eThekwini	Ballito	0	0	—	R102, oThongathi, KwaDukuza	At-grade intersection
M4 ends

== Incidents ==
=== 2022 KwaZulu-Natal flood damage ===
The section of the M4 in La Mercy, where it crosses the uMdloti River, was damaged by the 2022 KwaZulu-Natal floods. The South African National Defence Force helped in the rebuilding of the bridge. The bridge was reopened on 10 July 2022.

The section of the M4 by Tongaat Beach (Boys Town) was also washed away by the 2022 KwaZulu-Natal floods. It was reopened on 26 August 2022.

The section of the M4 crossing the uThongathi River was also damaged by the floods. A contractor was appointed by the National Roads Agency to repair the bridge in July 2023 and it was scheduled to be opened to traffic on 19 December 2023. It officially opened on 14 December 2023.
