= M1 (Durban) =

Metropolitan route in eThekwini, South Africa

Metropolitan route M1

Route information
- Maintained by eThekwini Metropolitan Municipality
- Length: 25.7 km (16.0 mi)

Major junctions
- North-west end: M13 / M31 in Pinetown
- N3 in Pinetown; M34 in Savannah Park; M22 in Westcliff; M20 in Bayview; N2 in Mobeni, Durban
- South-east end: R102 in Mobeni, Durban

Location
- Country: South Africa
- Towns: Pinetown, Chatsworth, Durban

Highway system
- Numbered routes of South Africa
→ M4

The M1 is a metropolitan route in the eThekwini Metropolitan Municipality, South Africa, linking Pinetown to Mobeni in Durban via Chatsworth.

== Route ==
The M1 officially starts at the M13 interchange (Exit 19) with the M31 Josiah Gumede Road, west of the Pinetown Central Business District (CBD) as Henry Pennington Road (previously Richmond Road). It proceeds southwards past the suburbs of Ashley, Surprise Farm, Alexander Park and Westmead before meeting the N3 highway (to Durban and Pietermaritzburg) at the Exit 23 interchange.

The M1 proceeds to turn in a southwesterly direction traversing through the suburbs of Mariannhill Park, Mariannhill, Mariannheights and Mariannridge before meeting the Old Richmond Road (to Eston and Richmond). It then proceeds to traverse the suburbs of Nsiswakazi (where it bends eastwards), St Wendolins Ridge, Phumphele, Savannah Park and Mawelewele (where it bends southwards) before leaving Pinetown and entering Chatsworth.

The M1 enters Chatsworth as a single-carriageway freeway named Higginson Highway, passing over the Moorcross Drive/Moorton Drive interchange and thereafter heading in an east-south-east direction. Shortly after, it splits into a dual carriageway, passing over the Moorcross Drive/Arena Park Drive interchange, the Shallcross Road interchange, north of Chatsworth's CBD, the Astral Drive/Florence Nightingale Drive interchange and the 42nd Avenue/Lenny Naidu Drive interchange. After 42nd Avenue, the M1 ends as a freeway and intersects with Havenside Drive before leaving Chatsworth to enter Durban in the suburb of Mobeni Heights. In Mobeni Heights, it intersects Mobeni Heights Drive before intersecting the N2 highway (to KwaDukuza and Port Shepstone) at the Exit 154 interchange. After the N2, it proceeds into the industrial suburb of Mobeni West, ending at the intersection with the R102 South Coast Road.

== History ==
The Higginson Highway was named for a leader of the Durban City Co-Operation Housing Committee that encouraged the relocation of Indian people from white-only areas of Durban to Chatsworth, along the highway's corridor. There is a community-led effort to rename the highway to instead honour Amichand Rajbansi, an Indian leader in the community.

The Higginson Highway is known for the numerous fatal accidents that happen on the road on a reoccurring basis. Some local residents attribute this to a ghost named "Sheila", thought to be a woman that hitchhikes on the road that may have died in one of the accidents, or may have committed suicide by running into traffic. A 2014 movie The Curse of Highway Sheila addressed this legend.
