= Bluff, KwaZulu-Natal =

Bluff
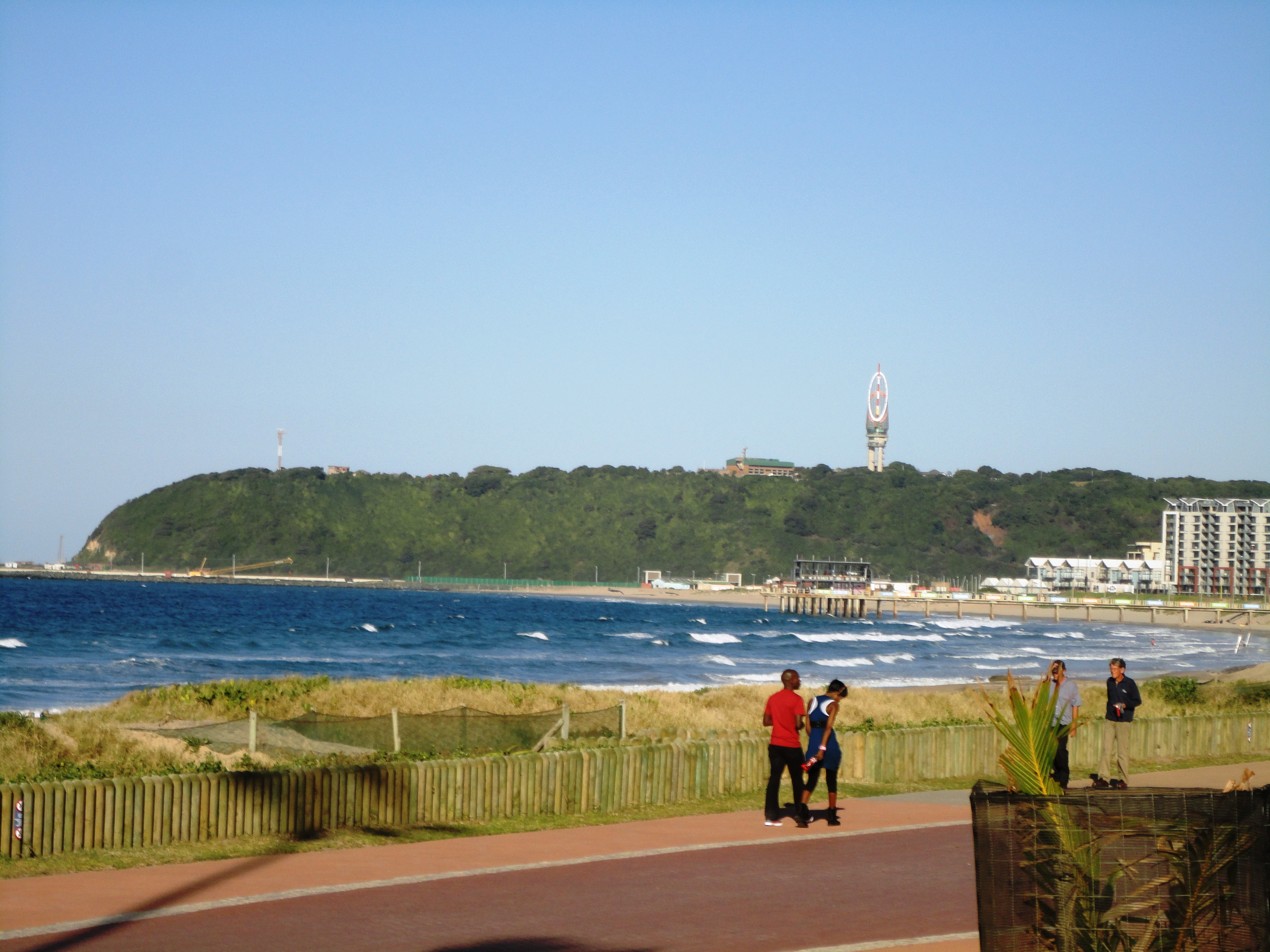
- The Bluff as seen from Greens Walk, Durban

- Location within KwaZulu-Natal Location within South Africa
- Coordinates: 29°55′29″S 31°0′14″E
- Country: South Africa
- Province: KwaZulu-Natal
- Municipality: eThekwini
- Main Place: Durban

Area
  - Total: 21.68 km^{2} (8.37 sq mi)

Population (2011)
  - Total: 68,124
  - Density: 3,142/km^{2} (8,138/sq mi)

Racial makeup (2011)
  - Black African: 15.6%
  - Coloured: 36.6%
  - Indian/Asian: 30.1%
  - White: 17.1%
  - Other: 0.6%

First languages (2011)
  - English: 79.8%
  - Zulu: 8.1%
  - Afrikaans: 7.2%
  - Xhosa: 1.7%
  - Other: 3.3%
- Time zone: UTC+2 (SAST)
- Postal code (street): 4052
- PO box: 4036

Bluff or The Bluff is a geographical area, containing eight suburbs in Durban, eThekwini Metropolitan Municipality, KwaZulu-Natal Province, South Africa. The Bluff forms a large part of the South Durban Basin, a sub-region located south of Durban.

== History ==
The promontory on which Bluff is situated is Durban's most prominent natural landmark. Accordingly, it probably served as an important visual reference for navigational approaches into Durban Harbour.

Between 1907 and 1975, the exposed south-east side of The Bluff housed a whaling station. Since the mid-nineteenth century, the region has been purposed for navigational and military uses. This use has provided protection for much of the area's native vegetation. Today, the area is considered important in the ecological management of Durban and environment.

== Etymology ==
The traditional Zulu name for Bluff is isibubulungu, meaning a long, round-shaped ridge. It also means "white man’s bluff", which may be a reference to habitation by shipwreck survivors.

The name of the area is derived from the long bluff - two ancient sand dunes on which most of the suburbs lie.

== Geography ==
The Bluff promonotory is a remnant of an extensive coastal dune system that formed along the shoreline of KwaZulu-Natal between two and five million years ago.It is situated just south of the Durban CBD and plays a key role in shielding the Port of Durban from the Indian Ocean, forming the port’s southern quayside. The area is bordered by the port’s Island View section to the north-west, the defunct Durban International Airport and SAPREF Petrochemical Refinery to the south, and the suburbs of Mobeni, Bayhead, and Clairwood further southwest and west. Within the area referred to as "The Bluff" lie the suburbs of Brighton Beach, Fynnland, Grosvenor, Jacobs, Merebank, Ocean View, Treasure Beach and Wentworth.

== Recreation ==
=== Beaches ===
The Bluff is a popular holiday destination, with extensive accommodation and plentiful seaside recreation. The area is known for its abundant sea life, including dolphins, and, in the winter months, whales.

The Bluff has access to six beaches including Ansteys Beach, Brighton Beach, Cuttings Beach, Garvies Beach and Treasure Beach. Amongst these beaches Ansteys and Brighton beaches are the most popular with Ansteys Beach home to two pools and Brighton Beach to three pools including one tidal pool. Most of the other beaches along the Bluff remain quiet and unspoilt.

=== Sports ===
Bluff National Park Golf Club is a large 18-hole golf course situated between the suburbs of Grosvenor and Ocean View.

== Economy ==
=== Industries ===
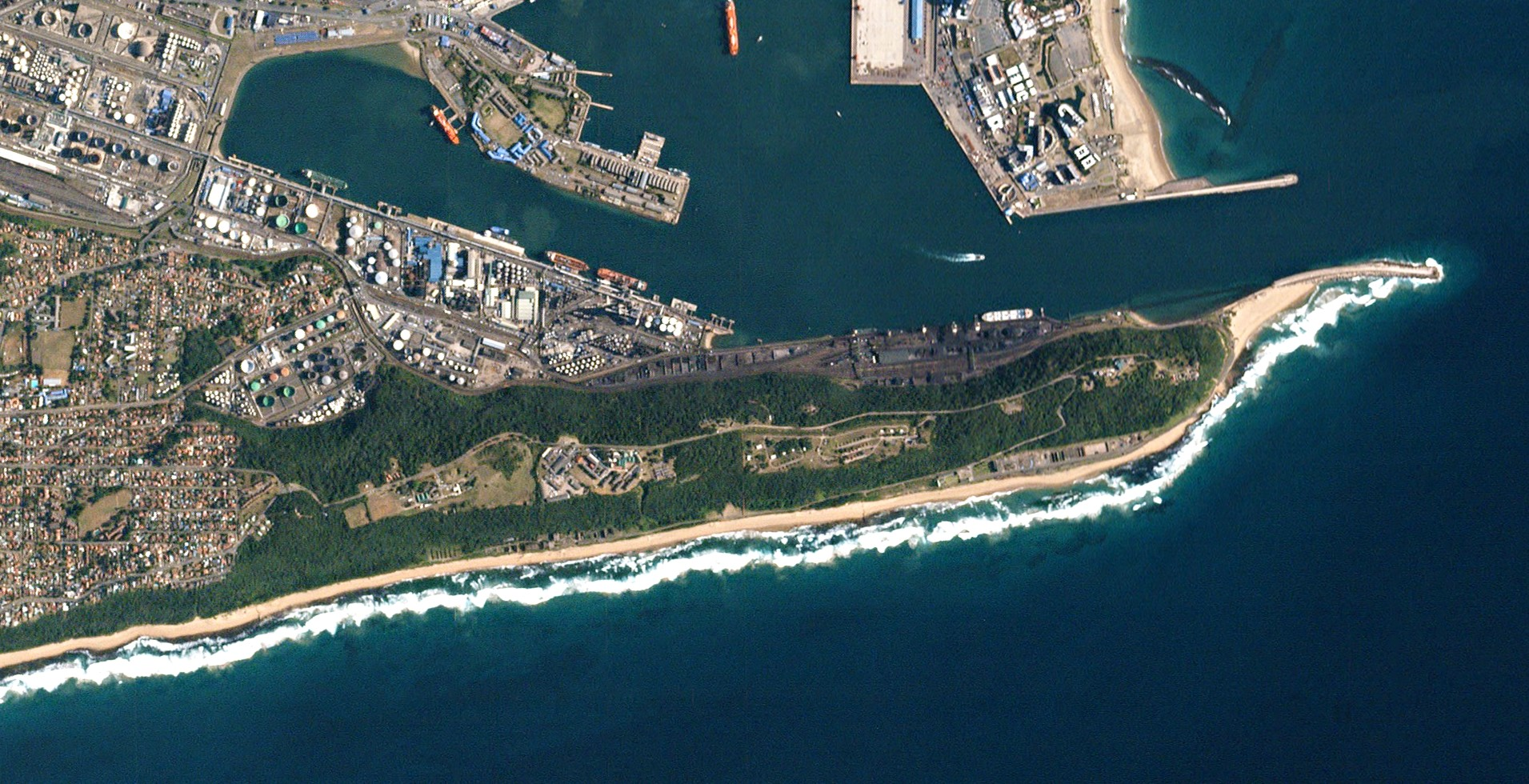
The northern promontory after which the area is named.

At the south end of the Bluff are two main residential suburbs: Wentworth and Merebank. Interspersed among the houses are a number of industries, including two of South Africa's largest oil refineries (Sapref and Engen facilities), the Mondi Paper Mill and other smaller factories. Durban's main airport was nearby until 2010. Durban International Airport moved and changed its name on 1 May 2010, relocating from the South Durban Basin to La Mercy on the North Coast.

The mixture of residential homes and large industries in the basin creates a challenge for all those who live and work in the area. Air pollution, water pollution, overcrowding and litter are some of the problems that residents and industries need to deal with. Community groups are attempting to resolve the issue by working with the large industries in the area.

=== Retail ===
There are two shopping centres in Wentworth serving the Bluff, namely Bluff Towers and Hillside Mall. Other shopping centres serving the area include Merebank Mall in Merebank and the Bluff Shopping Centre in Grosvenor.

== Infrastructure ==
=== Healthcare ===
Wentworth District Hospital is a government-funded hospital and is the sole hospital in the Bluff, aimed at serving the area.

=== Policing ===
The Bluff is divided over two SAPS precincts with the southern part including Merebank, Merewent, Treasure Beach and Jacobs covered by Wentworth SAPS while the northern part including Wentworth, Brighton Beach, Ocean View, Fynnlands and Grosvenor covered by Brighton Beach SAPS.

=== Transport ===
==== Roads ====
Key arterial routes in the Bluff include:

- M4 (Inkosi Albert Luthuli Freeway) – connects Durban CBD to the north with the South Coast to the south (via the N2).
- M7 (Solomon Mahlangu Drive; Bluff Road; Old Mission Road; Grays Inn Road) – connects the Bluff with Queensburgh to the west.

The two main suburban routes within the Bluff include:

- Marine Drive is a coastal route within the Bluff, connecting Merebank with seaside suburbs such as Treasure Beach, Brighton Beach, and Ocean View
- Tara Road serves as the key inland corridor, connecting Merebank with Jacobs, Wentworth, Grosvenor, and Fynnlands
