= Shallcross, Durban =

Shallcross
- Location within KwaZulu-Natal Location within South Africa
- Coordinates: 29.887°S 30.877°E
- Country: South Africa
- Province: KwaZulu-Natal
- Municipality: eThekwini
- Main Place: Queensburgh

Area
  - Total: 3.71 km^{2} (1.43 sq mi)

Population (2011)
  - Total: 14,514
  - Density: 3,910/km^{2} (10,100/sq mi)

Racial makeup (2011)
  - Black African: 12.8%
  - Coloured: 1.5%
  - Indian/Asian: 85.2%
  - White: 0.3%
  - Other: 0.2%

First languages (2011)
  - English: 87.2%
  - Zulu: 5.1%
  - Xhosa: 3.8%
  - Afrikaans: 1.3%
  - Other: 2.6%
- Time zone: UTC+2 (SAST)
- Postal code (street): 4093
- PO box: 4079

Shallcross is a suburb of Queensburgh in KwaZulu-Natal, South Africa, situated approximately 23 kilometres south-west of Durban by road.

== Gang activity ==
Shallcross experienced intermittent gang violence from 2019 to 2021. In January 2021 Yaganathan "Teddy Mafia" Pillay became the 8th victim in an ongoing turf war over drug distribution and sales. A relative of Pillay alleged that the police had failed to arrest any of the killers, and may have been bribed. In one of several drive-by shootings following these murders, a 52 year old man died on 8 March in Taurus street.
