= Verulam, KwaZulu-Natal =

Verulam
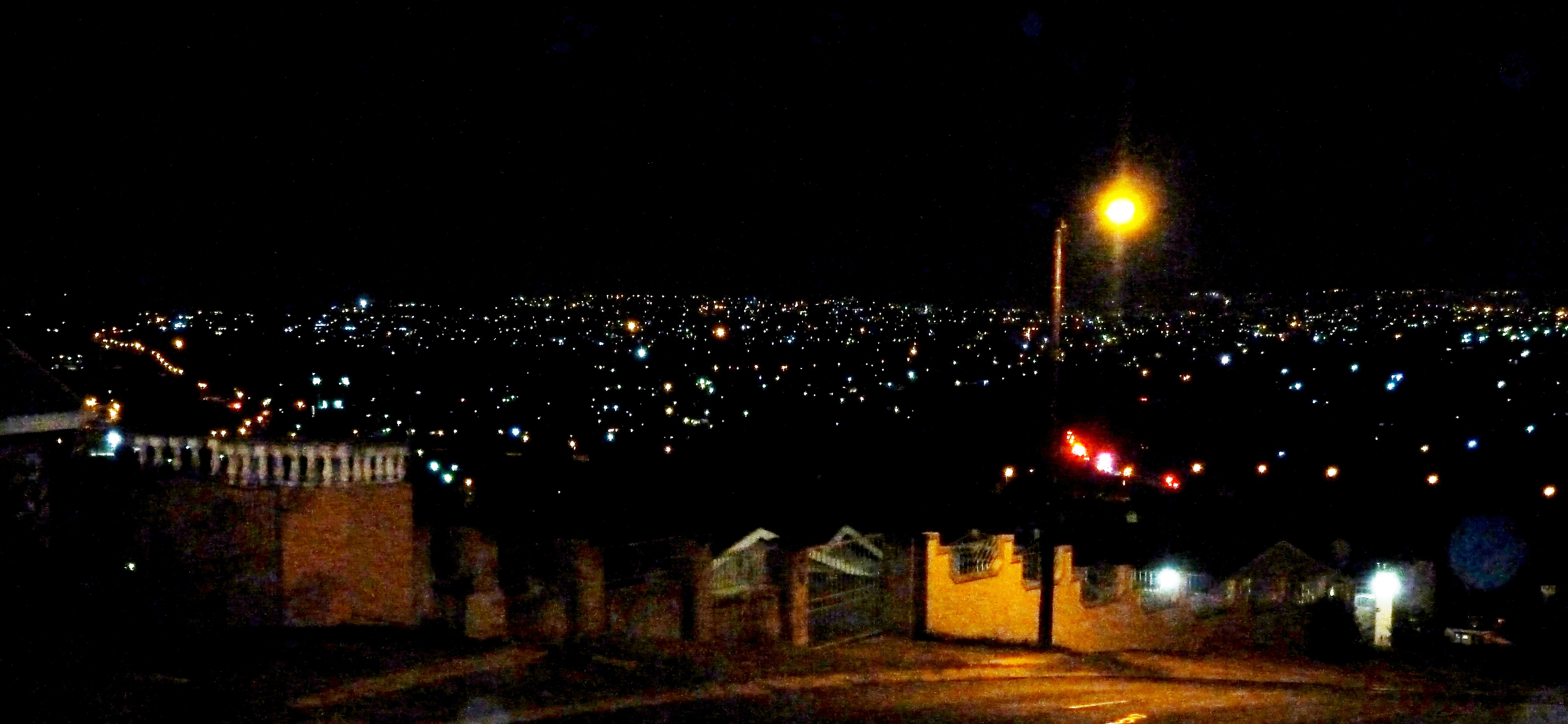

- Location within KwaZulu-Natal Location within South Africa
- Coordinates: 29°39′S 31°03′E
- Country: South Africa
- Province: KwaZulu-Natal
- Municipality: eThekwini
- Established: 1850

Area
  - Total: 18.13 km^{2} (7.00 sq mi)

Population (2011)
  - Total: 37,273
  - Density: 2,056/km^{2} (5,325/sq mi)

Racial makeup (2011)
  - Black African: 38.2%
  - Coloured: 1.5%
  - Indian/Asian: 59.1%
  - White: 0.3%
  - Other: 0.9%

First languages (2011)
  - English: 62.2%
  - Zulu: 25.4%
  - Xhosa: 4.9%
  - S. Ndebele: 1.3%
  - Other: 6.2%
- Time zone: UTC+2 (SAST)
- Postal code (street): 4339
- PO box: 4340
- Area code: 032

Verulam (/vɛrləm/) is a town 24 kilometres north of Durban in KwaZulu-Natal, South Africa and forms part of the eThekwini Metropolitan Municipality, governing the Greater Durban metropolitan area. This region is a culturally rich blend of old and new, shaped by Indian settlers.

== History ==
=== Origin of the name ===
The name Verulam is derived from Verulamium, an ancient Roman settlement located approximately 30 kilometres north of London. Verulamium itself took its name from Verlemion, a Celtic Iron Age settlement whose name translates as "the settlement above the marsh." Following the Roman conquest of Britain in AD 43, it grew into one of the largest towns in Roman Britain before being attacked and destroyed by the Saxons around AD 600–700. The medieval town of St Albans was subsequently built upon its ruins.

=== Founding (1850) ===
The founder of Natal's Verulam was William Josiah Irons, a native of St Albans, who established the Christian Emigration and Colonisation Society with the aim of settling non-conformist — predominantly Wesleyan — emigrants in Natal. Irons initially secured the patronage of the Earl of Verulam, whose father had previously served as Member of Parliament for St Albans, and named the proposed settlement in his honour. In May 1849, Irons dispatched his brother Theophilus to Natal as advance agent to prepare for the settlers' arrival.

Irons subsequently partnered with emigration promoter Joseph Charles Byrne, whose Natal agent John Swales Moreland assisted in land allocation. Byrne & Co. acquired the 22,500-acre landholding of the defunct Natal Cotton Company, and it was on a portion of this that the new settlement was established.

On 23 January 1850, the first vessel carrying Irons's settlers, the King William, arrived at Port Natal (present-day Durban) with 275 passengers, of whom 48 were Wesleyans. After weeks of negotiations over land repossession, the site was formally inspected on 6 March 1850. The town site was chosen on the south bank of the uMdloti River — a location consistent with Irons's stated criteria for "an eligible situation, not far from the sea-port of D'Urban, contiguous to a high road and near a river."

On 13 March 1850, led by Thomas Champion, the first party of settlers arrived at the site by ox-wagon. At the place where the town was to be established, Champion raised a dark blue flag bearing the word "VERULAM" in gold letters — an event regarded as the formal founding of the town. Verulam was then the third formal settlement established in the Colony of Natal, after Durban and Pietermaritzburg.

The surrounding Cotton Lands also accommodated other Byrne & Co. immigrants, their villages being Mount Moreland to the east and New Glasgow to the north, neither of which developed into a town.

=== Early development ===
Within a year of the settlers' arrival, Verulam's first chapel — a wattle-and-daub structure under thatch — had been erected, the first such building constructed beyond the boundaries of Durban and Pietermaritzburg. The settlement comprised 52 families (152 individuals) occupying 23 houses, with 50 one-acre allotments under cultivation and livestock holdings including 200 cattle and 80 pigs.

The first public school, the Verulam Day School in Chapel Street, opened in 1853 under the superintendence of Thomas Champion. By 1854, it had 40 pupils, including approximately 14–15 African children from the Verulam Native Christian Society. The school became exclusively for white children in 1859, following the establishment of a school at the Verulam Native Mission.

A library was opened in November 1856, and in 1858 a lecture and reading room was constructed for what had become known as the Verulam Library and Literary Institute, after Irons had sent out an initial stock of books valued at £6 in 1850.

By 1857, due to its position on the main traffic route between Durban and areas to the north, Verulam had grown into the third-largest town in the Colony. The first Indians arrived in Verulam in 1861, employed as labourers on white-owned farms. By 1890, the town's population comprised 451 whites, 273 Indians, and 349 Africans.

=== Agricultural experiments ===
Prior to the founding of the town, the region had been the site of attempts to establish a cotton-growing industry. Following Britain's annexation of Natal as a district of the Cape Colony in 1845, Cape merchants formed the Natal Cotton Company in 1847, acquiring the same 22,500-acre tract of land for cotton production. The venture failed entirely — not one ounce of cotton was produced — and the grant lapsed. Despite this, the trials confirmed that cotton could grow in Natal's climate. Subsequent experiments with arrowroot, tobacco, tea, and coffee were undertaken before sugar cane ultimately proved viable as the region's dominant agricultural crop.

=== Local government ===
By 1882, Verulam had officially acquired town status. Its first town board held its inaugural meeting on 7 September 1882, with Thomas Groom serving as the inaugural chairman. The town was administered by an all-white town board until 1967.

On 4 December 1964, Verulam was proclaimed an Indian area under the apartheid government's Group Areas Act. In anticipation of this change, a local affairs committee of three Indian members had been elected in October 1961 to advise the town board on matters affecting Indian residents. In September 1967, the first all-Indian town board was appointed by the Administrator of Natal. By 1969, town board members were elected by popular vote, and Dick Naicker was appointed as town clerk.

The pace of development following the transfer of administration into Indian hands was substantial. Roads in the central business district were tarred, a sewerage system installed, a town planning scheme adopted, and residential and industrial areas proclaimed. Several new suburbs emerged around the CBD as affordable plots attracted residents from surrounding areas.

=== Borough status ===
The town's growth was such that within a decade of the 1967 transition it had acquired borough status. In the same year as the first borough council elections, a council of 12 members was elected, with YS Chinsamy as mayor.

Internal divisions among councillors led the Natal Provincial Administration to dissolve the council in 1980. The borough was downgraded to town board status, and a caretaker board of three members was appointed. Fresh elections were held in August 1980, resulting in the election of SGV Subban as mayor, a position he held for the following eight years.

During Subban's mayoralty, significant infrastructure was developed, including Verulam's first swimming pool, the new Market Plaza, the development of Orient Park, a new library, a low-cost housing scheme, and industrial development at the Missionlands area. Subsequent mayors included Cllr L Palliam (1988–1990), Cllr R Munsamy (1990–1991), and Cllr R Rambaran (1991–1996).

=== Incorporation into eThekwini ===
The final years of the borough period were occupied with negotiations for Verulam's incorporation into the new post-apartheid local government structures. These negotiations resulted in the amalgamation of Verulam with Umhlanga and Tongaat into the Durban Northern Transitional Local Government sub-structure, and subsequently the North Local Council. Verulam formally ceased to be an independent borough and became part of the eThekwini Metropolitan Municipality in 1996.

=== 150th anniversary ===
On 13 March 2000 — exactly 150 years after the town's founding — the Verulam Historical Society held a commemorative function at the Verulam Day Care Centre, followed by an exhibition of historical photographs. Later in the year, the Durban North Local Council formed the Verulam Celebrations Committee, which organised a series of events including a street party, arts and crafts exhibitions, a community awards ceremony, and a float parade through the town. The Anniversary Park was formally opened on 23 November 2000.

=== An extensive history write up ===
Amber Ramdass, a retired school principal has written a longer article on the history of Verulam which can be found in the reference. All credits to him for this section as this section was based on his work and is credited as such.

== Demography ==
Verulam is inhabited mainly by people of Indian descent. As of 2011, the population stood at more than 37,000. There are several primary and secondary schools catering for all races and all areas of the town. The town contains densely populated residential and industrial areas, which include a multitude of shopping centres as well as mosques, temples and churches. On the outskirts are large farming areas, several built-up townships, and rural townships. There has been slow but steady progress in modernising the town by providing adequate infrastructure to the rural areas.

== Genealogical records ==
Physical records of Indian indentured labourers who arrived in Natal between 1860 and 1911 are held at the Verulam Library. These records, originally preserved by the Gandhi-Luthuli Documentation Centre at the University of KwaZulu-Natal, document the names, villages of origin, ages, ship voyages, and employer details of over 152,000 individuals who formed the foundation of the Indian community in the region, including many who settled in and around Verulam.

Descendants of indentured labourers can search these records online through SA Indian Routes (saindianroutes.co.za), a publicly accessible digital archive covering 384 ship voyages and 565 employers across the indenture period.

== Geography ==
Verulam is located on the banks of the uMdloti River, predominantly situated south of the river. It is bordered by Waterloo and Cornubia to the south-east, Phoenix to the south, Mawothi to the south-west and Redcliffe to the west. Nearby communities in the surrounding area include Mount Edgecombe (10 km) to the south-east, eMdloti (10 km) to the east, uMhlanga (12 km) to the south-east and oThongathi (13km) to the north-east.

=== Suburbs ===
The 2011 census divided the urban area of Verulam into 23 “sub-places” including:

- Barrs Flats (industrial)
- Brindhaven (residential)
- Canelands (industrial)
- Cordoba Gardens (residential)
- Dawncrest (residential)
- Everest Heights (residential)
- Grangetown (residential)
- Litchie Farm (residential)
- Lotus Farm (residential)
- Lotusville (residential/industrial)
- Mountview (residential)
- Mzomuhle (residential)
- Oaklands (residential)
- Ottawa (residential)
- Redcliffe (residential)
- Riet River (residential)
- Riverview Park (residential/industrial)
- Riyadh (residential)
- Saana Township (residential)
- Southridge (residential)
- Temple Valley (residential)
- Umhloti Heights (residential/industrial)
- Valdin Heights (residential)

== Religious places of interest ==
One of the main attractions in Verulam is the Sri Gopalall Hindu Temple, which was opened in 1913 by Mahatma Gandhi. It is situated in the small suburb of Temple Valley in Verulam. It is one of the oldest temples in South Africa and still caters for prayer and wedding ceremonies. The Shree Siva Subramaniar Alayam has a significant following of devotees, with the annual Kavady procession being one of the highlights of the temple's calendar. It is situated along the Umdloti River.

Another temple is the Gayathri Peedam, situated in Brindhaven. This is the only temple in Africa that houses two full figure Gayathri Murthis. The ashram is very busy with sacred mantra chants and crystal healing crusades, weekly Navagrahas, full moon (Pournami) prayers and Friday satsangs. The peedam hosts a meditation garden; a Hanuman shrine, Shiva Mandir, Sani shrine and the only Mahavatar Kriya Babaj shrine in Africa. The ashram focuses on community and youth development programs.

Christ Embassy Verulam is a church in Temple Valley run by Dr. Pastor Shane Maharaj and is a local branch of the main Christ Embassy Church in Nigeria headed by Pastor Chris Oyakhilome.

Blessed Life Ministries is a full gospel community church that is situated at the Redcliffe Primary School.

Muslim writer and motivational speaker Ahmed Deedat is buried in Verulam.

== Nature ==
The Hazelmere Dam, just a few kilometres from Verulam, features a variety of activities, such as watersports, fishing, nature walks, bird watching, a wide range of game, campsites & luxury accommodation.

Verulam is situated just 8.5 km from the small community of Mount Moreland, an important roosting site for the European barn swallow.

== Schools and Care Centre ==
Verulam has numerous schools, which include Lotusville Primary, Verulam Primary, Dawncrest Primary, Verulam Secondary, Mountview Secondary, Temple Valley Secondary, Verulam Independent School, Trenance Park Secondary, Everest Heights Primary School and Glenhaven Secondary School. Verulam Secondary School has had numerous learners placed among the top 10 matriculants in the province and nationally and has achieved a pass rate of +-97% for six consecutive years . Temple Valley Secondary has achieved a 95%+ pass rate for the past five years.

Verulam is also home to the Verulam Day and Frail Care Centre. The Frail Care Centre caters to destitute, frail and elderly citizens with 24-hour nursing care. There is also a hall that is hired out for various functions and meetings.

== Industry ==
Verulam is one of the smaller industrial nodes in the Greater Durban metropolitan area, with most industries concentrated in the northern part of the town. Notable industries operating in Verulam include: Colgate-Palmolive (oral care), Grafton Everest (furniture), AfriSam (construction materials), Frimax (snacks), Packo (spices) and the Parachute Industries of Southern Africa (sport parachutes). Additionally, Shoprite, Africa’s largest supermarket chain, along with its subsidiary Freshmark, has its regional distribution centres for KwaZulu-Natal based in Verulam.

The Verulam Market, opened by the then Verulam Town Board in 1884, is a historic fresh produce market that draws daily customers from all over KwaZulu-Natal and provides income to many residents of the town.

== Transport ==
=== Air ===
King Shaka International Airport is the only international airport in the Greater Durban metropolitan area and is located approximately 8 km northeast of Verulam via the R102 and M65. It offers flights to various domestic destinations in South Africa and international routes to Doha, Dubai, Harare, Lusaka, Manzini and Istanbul.

=== Rail ===
The main Metrorail commuter route, known as the North Coast Line, runs between Durban in the south (via Mount Edgecombe) and KwaDukuza in the north-east (via oThongathi), serving Verulam with three stations: Verulam Railway Station, which is the main station located in the Verulam CBD, Canelands to the north, and Ottawa to the south.

=== Road ===
Verulam is positioned just off the N2, the major freeway connecting Durban in the south with King Shaka International Airport and KwaDukuza to the north. The R102 is the primary north–south route through Verulam, linking oThongathi to Mount Edgecombe while skirting the CBD to the west. The M27 serves as the main east–west road, running south of the CBD as Jabu Ngcobo Drive and Old Inanda Road. This road connects eMdloti to Buffelsdraai and provides access to both the N2 and M4 highways.

Both the R102 and M4 offer untolled alternatives to the northbound tolled N2, with the M4 also serving as a southbound alternative route to uMhlanga and Durban.
