= Magazine Barracks, Durban =

The Magazine Barracks, was an area in Durban, South Africa, that housed Indian labourers, who worked for the Durban Corporation (the municipality of Durban, now absorbed into the eThekwini Metropolitan Municipality), and their families. Built in 1880, close to the centre of Durban, these rudimentary tin and wood shelters were adjacent to military buildings that stored ammunitions or magazines. Hence the name magazine barracks.

The barracks had a population of up to 6,000 people at times, living in 1251 rooms, and living conditions were regarded as "wretched" due to an unwillingness of the authorities to upgrade the area.

As part of the implementation of apartheid policies, including the Group Areas Act, Indians were removed from the Magazine Barracks, and resettled in areas including Chatsworth, which were much further from the city centre of Durban.

Located next to the Magazine Barracks, was a similar black African labour compound called Baumannville.

The site of the Magazine Barracks is now the location of the Durban Magistrates Court and police headquarters.
