= M21 (Durban) =

Metropolitan route in eThekwini, South Africa

Metropolitan route M21

Route information
- Maintained by the eThekwini Metropolitan Municipality
- Length: 17 km (11 mi)

Major junctions
- North end: M25 in KwaMashu
- M5 in Newlands West N2 in Springfield Park, Durban R102 in Umgeni Park, Durban
- South end: M4 in Durban North, Durban

Location
- Country: South Africa
- Towns: KwaMashu, Newlands West, Durban

Highway system
- Numbered routes of South Africa
← M20	→ M22

The M21 is a metropolitan route in the eThekwini Metropolitan Municipality, South Africa linking Durban with Phoenix via Newlands West and KwaMashu.

== Route ==
The M21 officially starts at the M25 interchange between Phoenix and KwaMashu as Malendela Road. It heads through KwaMashu in a southwesterly direction, passing through the KwaMashu Central Business District (CBD) and then turning to a south-southwesterly direction to intersect the M5 (Dumisani Makhaye Drive). After the M5, the M21 proceeds to enter into Newlands West as Inanda Road, bordering the township to the east and winding down the hilly topography in a south-easterly direction until it meets the N2 highway at the Exit 170 interchange.

After the N2, the M21 proceeds to enter Durban where it passes through the industrial area of Springfield Park in an easterly direction and changes its name to Sea Cow Lake Road after intersecting with Sea Cow Lake Road (to Sea Cow Lake).

Shortly after, the M21 intersects with the R102 (Chris Hani Road). It turns right onto Chris Hani Road, cosigning with the R102 for only 110 meters and then turning left in an easterly direction straddling along the northern banks of the uMngeni River. It borders the Durban North suburbs of Umgeni Park and Prospect Hall to the south before ending at the exit 3 interchange with the M4 (Ruth First Highway).
