= Metropolitan routes in Durban =

South African road network

Ethekwini (Durban metropolitan area), like most South African metropolitan areas, uses metropolitan or "M" routes for important intra-city routes, a layer below national (N) roads and regional (R) roads. Each city's M roads are independently numbered.

Durban metropolitan 1 route marker

Durban metropolitan 20 route marker

== Table of M roads ==
| No. | Direction | Description of route | Suburbs | Street names | Other |
|---|---|---|---|---|---|
| M1 | North/South then East/West | M13 / M31 (Westmead) – N3 – M34 – M22 – M20 – N2 – R102 (Mobeni West) | Westmead, Ashley, Caversham Glen, Mariannhill, Mariannridge, Intake, Savannah Park, Crossmoor, Moorton, Arena Park, Westcliff, Havenside, Mobeni Heights, Mobeni West | Henry Pennington Rd, Higginson Highway, Grimsby Rd | Part highway |
| M4 | North/South | N2 (Merebank, Start highway) – M7 – M11 – R102 (start cosigned) – N3 – M13 – M15 – R102 (end cosigned) – M12 – M17 (Start highway) – M21 – M41 – M12 – M27 – M43 (End highway) – N2 – R102 (near Shaka's Head) | Merebank, Austerville, Mobeni East, Clairwood, Rossburgh, uMbilo Industrial, Congela, Maydon Wharf, Esplanade, Warwick, Old Fort, Blue Lagoon, Prospect Hall, Broadway, Virginia, Glenashley, La Lucia, uMhlanga Rocks, eMdloti, La Mercy, Desainagar, Tongaat Beach, Genazano, Zimbali, Ballito | Inkosi Albert Luthuli Fwy, West Street / Smith Street, Warwick Avenue / Market Rd (R102), Williams St / Leopold St (R102), Old Fort Rd / Ordinance Rd, Prince Alfred St / Stanger Street, Ruth First Fwy, Leo Boyd Hwy, Ballito Dr | Part highway |
| M5 | North/South then East/West | Starts at Kwa-Mashu – M32 – M19 – M31 – M13 – M34 – M7 – M10 – M10 (cosigned) – M7 – R102 (uMbilo) | KwaMashu, Newlands, Ntuzuma, Kwa-Dabeka, Berkshire Downs, Falcon Industrial Park, Cowies Hill Park, Sarnia, Moseley Park, Glen Park, Moseley, Northdene, Escombe, Malvern, Hillary, Bellair, Sea View, Rossburgh, uMbilo | Dinkelman Rd, Otto Volek Rd, Stapleton Rd, Underwood Rd, Main Rd, Sarnia Rd | |
| M7 | East/West | M13 / M19 (Hatton Estate, Start highway) – N3 – M34 – M5 – N2 (end of Highway) – M10 – R102 (start cosign) – M5 – R102 (end cosign) – M4 – M16 (cosigned) – ends at Brighton Beach | Hatton Estate, Farningham Ridge, Moseley Park, Northdene, Escomb, Malvern, Hillary, Carrington Heights, Rossburgh, Sea View, Clairwood, Wentworth, Brighton Beach | M7 Freeway, Solomon Mahlangu Dr, Old Mission Rd, Brighton Rd, Grays Inn Rd | Part highway |
| M8 | North/South | M9 (Glenwood) – M11 – M13 – M15 – M17 (Essenwood) | Glenwood, Bulwer, Musgrave, Essenwood | ZK Matthews Rd, Bulwer Rd, Cleaver Rd, Botanic Gardens Rd, Edith Benson Cresc, Problem Mkhize Rd | |
| M9 | East/West | M32 / M10 (Wiggins) – M8 – R102 – ends at Congella | Wiggins, Glenwood, Congella | Francisco Rd | |
| M10 | East/West then north–south | M5 (Escombe) – M22 – M20 – M5 (cosigned) – M7 – M9/M32 – M13 (cosigned) – M15 – M17 – M19 (Springfield) | Escombe, Queensmead, Mount Vernon, Hillary, Bellair, uMkumbaan, Wiggins, Cato Crest, Waterval Park, Sparks, Sydenham, Springfield | Stella Rd, Sarnia Rd (M5), Wakesleigh Rd, Vusi Mzemela Rd, King Cetshwayo Hwy (M13), Brickfield Rd, Alpine Rd | |
| M11 | East/West | M8 (Bulwer) – R102 – M4 (Esplanade) | Bulwer, Esplanade | Che Guevara Rd | |
| M12 | North/South | M4 (Old Fort) – M17 – M41 – M4 (uMhlanga Rocks) | Stamford Hill, Athlone, Broadway, Glen Hills, Virginia, Glen Anil, Glen Ashley, Sunningdale, Somerset Park, uMhlanga Ridge, uMhlanga Rocks | Masabalala Yengwa Ave, Kenneth Kaunda Rd, uMhlanga Rocks Dr | |
| M13 | East/West | N3 (near Assagay, Start highway) – M46 - R103 – M39 – M39 – M1/M31 – M7/M19 – M5 – N3 – M31 – N3 – M32 – M15 (End highway) – N3 – M10 (cosigned) – R102/M4 (Warwick) | Assagay, St Helier, Gillitts, Kloof, Fields Hill, Padfield Park, Manor, Westmead, Ashley, Hatton Estate, Cowies Hill Park, Woodside, Grayleigh, Beverley Hills, Sherwood, Watervall Park, Westridge, Bulwer, Warwick | King Cetshwayo Hwy, King Dinuzulu Rd, Cannongate Rd/Chris Ntuli Rd | Part highway |
| M15 | East/West | R102 / M4 (Warwick) – M8 – M10 – M13 (Sparks) | Warwick, Essenwood, Sydenham, Sparks | Cross St / grey St, Gladys Manzi Rd, John Zikhali Rd, ridge Rd, South Rd, Moses Kotane Rd, Locksley Dr | |
| M16 | Southwest / Northeast | R102 (Montclair) – M7 (cosigned) – ends at Fynnlands | Montclair, Jacobs, Clairwood, Grosvernor, Fynnlands | Bluff Rd | |
| M17 | East/West | M10 (Morningside) – M17 – R102 – M12 – M4 (Old Fort) | Springfield, Morningside, Essenwood, Windermere, Stamford Hill | Hendry Rd, Earl Haig Rd, Springfield Rd, Sandile Thusi Rd | |
| M19 | East/West | M7 / M13 (Hatton Estate, Start highway) – M31 – M32 – M5 – M32 – N2 (End highway) – M10 – R102 (Puritan Hills) | Hatton Estate, Pinetown CBD, Falcon Industrial Park, Atholl Heights, Reservoir Hills, Palmiet, Springfield, Puritan Hills | St Johns Ave, M19 Hwy, Umgeni Rd | Part highway |
| M20 | North/South | M10 (Mount Vernon) – M1 (Bayview) | Mount Vernon, uMhlatuzana, Bayview | Hillary Rd, Chatsworth Main Rd | |
| M21 | North/South then East/West | M25 (Phoenix Industrial) – M45 – N2 – R102 – M4 (Prospect Hill) | Phoenix Industrial, KwaMashu, Siyanda, Newlands West, Steelcastle, Newlands East, Parlock, Springfield Flats, Riverside, Prospect Hil | Malandela Rd, Inanda Rd, Riverside Rd | |
| M22 | North/South | M10 (Queensmead) – M1 (Westcliff) | Queensmead, Kharwastan, Westcliff | Carrick Rd, Erica Ave, Astral Dr | |
| M25 | East/West | Starts in eMachobeni – M27 – M26 - M21 – R102 (cosigned) – N2 (near Avoca Hills) | eMachobeni, Glebe, Congo, Langalibalele, Mshayazafe, Newtown, eZimangweni, eMzomusha, Phoenix Industrial, KwaMashu, Duff's Road | Curnick Ndlovu Hwy | |
| M26 | North/South | R102 (Palmview) – M25 (Phoenix Industrial) | Palmview, Shastri Park, Brookdale, Northcroft, Starwood, Whetstone, Redfern, Phoenix Industrial | Gopalall Hurbans Rd, JG Champion Dr, Phoenix Hwy, Industrial Park Rd | |
| M27 | North/South then East/West | M25 (Congo) – R102 – N2 – M4 – ends in eMdloti | Congo, amaTikwe, Tafula, Goqokazi, eKafuleni, Trenance Park, Dawncrest, Cordoba Gardens, Mountview, Brindhaven, Lotusville, Southridge, Waterloo, eMdloti | Mafukuzela Hwy, Jabu Ngcobo Dr | |
| M29 | North/South then East/West | M5 (Sea View) – R102 (Mobeni) | Sea View, Coedmore, Yellowwood Park, Woodlands, Mobeni | Coedmore Rd, Kenyon Howden Rd | |
| M30 | East/West | R603 (near uMbumbulu) – M35 – R102 (uMlazi) | uMbumbulu, uMlazi | Griffiths Mxenge Hwy | |
| M31 | East/West | M1 / M13 (Westmead) – M19 – M32 – M5 – M13 (Cowies Hill Park) | Westmead, Pinetown CBD, Cowies Hill Park | Josiah Gumede Rd | |
| M32 | East/West | M31 (Pinetown CBD) – M19 – M39 – M5 – M19 – M13 – N3 – M10/M9 (Wiggins) | Pinetown CBD, Pineside, The Wolds, Clermont, Atholl Heights, Grayleigh, Beverley Heights, Blackhurst, Wiggins, University of KwaZulu-Natal, Glenwood, Congella, Maydon Wharf | Beviss Rd, Qashana Khuzwayo Rd, Roger Sishi Rd, Jan Hofmeyr Rd, St James Ave, Harry Gwala Rd, Rick Turner Rd | |
| M33 | East/West | R103 (Hillcrest) – M39 – M39 (Kloof CBD) | Hillcrest, Belvedere, Waterfall, Forest Hills, Everton, Kloof CBD | iNanda Rd, Link Rd, Bridle Rd, Kloof Falls Rd, Church Rd, Old Main Rd | |
| M34 | North/South | M5 (Moseley Park) – M7 – M1 (Savannah Park) | Moseley Park, Highlands Hills, Nirvana Hills, Shallcross, Savannah Park | Hans Dettman Hwy | |
| M35 | East/West | R603 (near Folweni) – N2 – M30 (uMlazi) | Folweni, Malukazi, Lotus Park, Isipingo Hills, Isipingo Rail, uMlazi | Sbu Magwanyane Dr, Wanda Cele Rd | |
| M37 | East/West | R603 (near Adams Mission) – N2 – R102 (Amanzimtoti) | Adams Mission, Adams Rural, Malagazi, Amanzimtoti | Moss Kolnik Dr | |
| M39 | East/West | M33 (Kloof CBD) – M13 – M13 – M33 – M32 (The Wolds) | Adams Mission, Adams Rural, Malagazi, Amanzimtoti | Moss Kolnik Dr | |
| M41 | East/West | M4 (La Lucia) – M12 – N2 – R102 (Mt Edgecombe) | La Lucia, uMhlanga Ridge, Cornubia, Mt Edgecombe | M41 | Highway |
| M43 | East/West | R102 (oThongathi) – N2 – M4 (Westbrook) | oThongathi, Westbrook | uShukela Dr (Watson Highway) | |
| M45 | North/South | R102 (Parkhill) – N2 – M21 (KwaMashu) | Parkhill, Kenville, Melkhoute, KwaMashu | Queen Nandi Dr | |
| M46 | North/South | N3 (near Assagay) – M59 - M13 – R103 (Assagay) | Assagay, Hillcrest | Kassier Rd | |
| M47 | North/South | Herrwood Dr (uMhlanga Ridge) – N2 - Umganu Rd (Cornubia) | uMhlanga Ridge, Cornubia | uMhlanga Ridge Blvd | |
| M59 | East/West | Starts in Outer West Durban – M46 (near Hillcrest) | | Cliffdale Rd | |
| M65 | East/West | R102 (near Nyaninga) – N2 (near La Mercy) | | Dube Blvd | |

== See also ==
- Numbered routes in South Africa
