= Sea Cow Lake, Durban =

Sea Cow Lake
- Location within KwaZulu-Natal Location within South Africa
- Coordinates: 29.8014°S 31.0034°E
- Country: South Africa
- Province: KwaZulu-Natal
- Municipality: eThekwini

Area
  - Total: 2.31 km^{2} (0.89 sq mi)

Population (2011)
  - Total: 8,911
  - Density: 3,860/km^{2} (9,990/sq mi)

Racial makeup (2011)
  - Black African: 85.0%
  - Coloured: 0.9%
  - Indian/Asian: 13.9%
  - White: 0.1%
  - Other: 0.1%

First languages (2011)
  - Zulu: 64.2%
  - English: 15.5%
  - Xhosa: 13.0%
  - Sotho: 1.3%
  - Other: 6.0%
- Time zone: UTC+2 (SAST)
- Postal code (street): 4051

Sea Cow Lake is a residential area in central Durban, KwaZulu-Natal, South Africa.
