= Montclair, Durban =

Montclair
- Location within KwaZulu-Natal Location within South Africa
- Coordinates: 29°55′S 30°58′E
- Country: South Africa
- Province: KwaZulu-Natal
- Municipality: eThekwini
- Main Place: Durban

Area
  - Total: 3.83 km^{2} (1.48 sq mi)

Population (2011)
  - Total: 16,301
  - Density: 4,260/km^{2} (11,000/sq mi)

Racial makeup (2011)
  - Black African: 70.7%
  - Coloured: 3.3%
  - Indian/Asian: 8.3%
  - White: 16.5%
  - Other: 1.2%

First languages (2011)
  - Zulu: 44.1%
  - English: 36.2%
  - Xhosa: 6.0%
  - Afrikaans: 4.5%
  - Other: 10.2%
- Time zone: UTC+2 (SAST)
- Postal code (street): 4004
- PO box: 4061

Montclair is a southern suburb of Durban, KwaZulu-Natal, South Africa. It lies west of Clairwood and north of Woodlands.
