= Newlands West =

- Location within KwaZulu-Natal Location within South Africa
- Coordinates: 29°46′S 30°57′E
- Country: South Africa
- Province: KwaZulu-Natal
- Municipality: eThekwini

Area
  - Total: 13.33 km^{2} (5.15 sq mi)

Population (2011)
  - Total: 50 627
  - Density: 3.8/km^{2} (9.7/sq mi)

Racial makeup (2011)
  - Black African: 66.3%
  - Indian/Asian: 31.1%
  - Coloureds: 1.7%
  - White: 0.3%
  - Other: 0.6%

First languages (2011)
  - Zulu: 55.7%
  - English: 36.4%
  - Xhosa: 2.9%
  - S. Ndebele: 1.2%
  - Other: 3.8%
- Time zone: UTC+2 (SAST)
- Postal code (street): 4037
- Area code: 031

Newlands West is a suburb located 15 kilometres (9 mi) north-west of Durban in the province of KwaZulu-Natal, South Africa.
