= Buffelsdraai =

- Location within KwaZulu-Natal Location within South Africa
- Coordinates: 29.645°S 30.978°E
- Country: South Africa
- Province: KwaZulu-Natal
- Municipality: eThekwini

Area
  - Total: 2.28 km^{2} (0.88 sq mi)

Population (2011)
  - Total: 3,078
  - Density: 1,350/km^{2} (3,500/sq mi)

Racial makeup (2011)
  - African: 98.9%
  - Coloured: 0.1%
  - Indian/Asian: 0.6%
  - White: 0.3%
  - Other: 0.1%

First languages (2011)
  - Zulu: 78.3%
  - Xhosa: 13.9%
  - English: 3.1%
  - Southern Ndebele: 1.1%
  - Other: 3.5%
- Time zone: UTC+2 (SAST)
- PO box: 4340

Buffelsdraai is a township in eThekwini in the KwaZulu-Natal province of South Africa.
