= Mdloti River =

Mdloti River uMdloti
- Location of the Mdloti River mouth
- Etymology: A Zulu word for "wild tobacco"

Location
- Country: South Africa
- Region: KwaZulu-Natal

Physical characteristics
- Source
  - location: South Africa
- Mouth: Indian Ocean
  - location: North of eMdloti, South Africa
  - coordinates: 29°39′4″S 31°7′41″E
  - elevation: 0 m (0 ft)

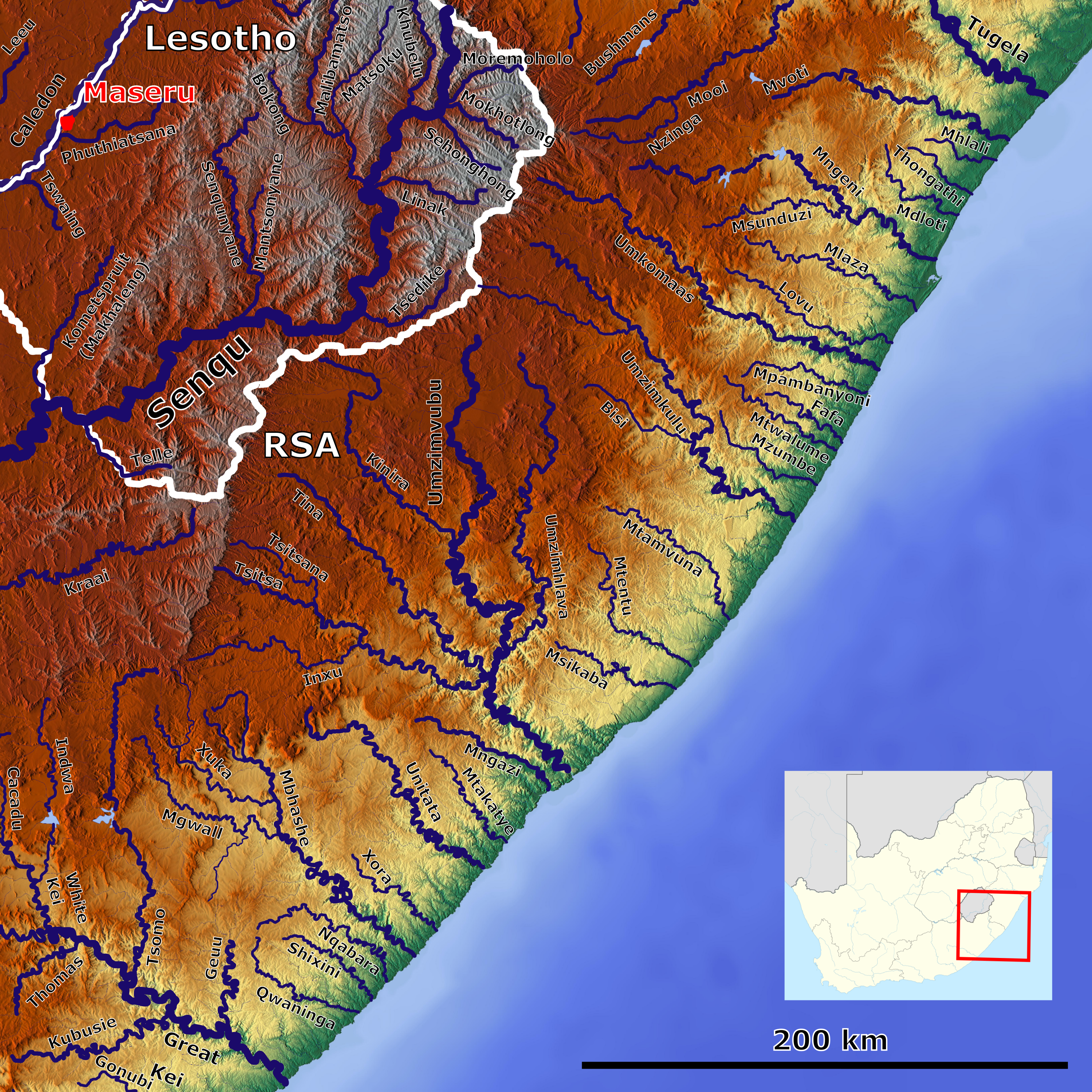
Rivers of south KwaZulu-Natal

The Mdloti River or uMdloti River flows in the KwaZulu-Natal province, South Africa.

The mouth of the Mdloti River is situated in eMdloti (part of eThekwini Metropolitan Municipality). The name Mdloti is the Zulu word for a species of wild tobacco that grows here.
