= Fawzia Peer =

South African politician

Deputy Mayor of eThekwini
- In office 23 August 2016 – 5 September 2019
- Mayor: Zandile Gumede
- Preceded by: Nomvuzo Shabalala
- Succeeded by: Belinda Scott

Personal details
- Born: Fawzia Asmal Stanger, Natal Province
- Party: African National Congress
- Relations: Kader Asmal (uncle)
- Education: University of KwaZulu-Natal

Fawzia Peer (née Asmal) is a South African politician and businesswoman. A member of the African National Congress, she was the Deputy Mayor of eThekwini Local Municipality between August 2016 and September 2019. During that time, from June 2019 onwards, she was the Acting Mayor while Mayor Zandile Gumede faced criminal charges.

In January 2023 Peer was co-opted onto the ANC National Executive Committee. The following year she became the head of capacity building for the BRICS Women's Business Alliance.

== Early life and education ==
Peer was born in Stanger in the former Natal Province. She was one of three children, and the only daughter, of Ebrahim and Mariam Asmal, who were conservative Muslims. She attended Stanger High School. In her later life, she completed postgraduate diplomas at the University of KwaZulu-Natal.

Her paternal uncle was Kader Asmal, an anti-apartheid activist who lived in exile in Britain. As a child she was disturbed by his exile, and when she visited Dublin he "conscientised" her, introducing her to the anti-apartheid movement and African National Congress (ANC). After the ANC was unbanned in 1990, she became a prominent figure in the party's branch in Durban.

== Deputy Mayor of eThekwini: 2016–2019 ==
Pursuant to the August 2016 local elections, Peer was elected as deputy mayor of the eThekwini Metropolitan Municipality, in which capacity she deputised mayor Zandile Gumede. City Press reported that her election followed "a shift of allegiance" by Peer, who had formerly been viewed as an ally of Gumede's predecessor and rival, James Nxumalo. In later years there were rumours that tensions continued to exist between Gumede and Peer.

In July 2018 the opposition Democratic Alliance (DA) reported Peer to the speaker of the council for violating the councillors' code of conduct. The complaint arose from a phone call between Peer and a resident of Reservoir Hills, which the resident recorded, in which Peer said that "service delivery is not my job" and suggested that she was not concerned about service delivery in DA-controlled wards.

Gumede was arrested on corruption charges in May 2019 and the ANC compelled her to take a leave of absence the following month. On 12 June 2019, the municipality confirmed that Peer was standing in as acting eThekwini mayor during Gumede's leave. Though Gumede was initially put on one month's leave, her leave was extended in August. Her allies reportedly ran a concerted campaign to block Peer from being appointed to the mayoral office permanently.

In the last week of August, the ANC announced a reshuffle of its caucus in eThekwini, which would see Mxolisi Kaunda replacing Gumede as mayor and Belinda Scott replacing Peer as deputy mayor. Peer continued as mayor until reshuffle could be effected. After Kaunda and Scott were sworn in on 5 September 2019, Peer continued to serve as an ordinary councillor until the November 2021 local elections, when she ceded her seat in the council. After she left the council, she retreated from politics and worked in the private sector as a consultant.

== ANC National Executive Committee: 2023–present ==
In January 2023, in an apparent political comeback for Peer, she and three other politicians – Steve Letsike, Alvin Botes, and Gerhard Koornhof – were co-opted onto the ANC's National Executive Committee. The committee had been elected for a five-year term at the ANC's recent 55th National Conference, but its demographic composition had been criticised; the party said that the co-options were intended to increase the representation of minorities on the committee.

In June 2024, Peer was appointed as head of capacity building for the BRICS Women's Business Alliance.

== Personal life ==
At the age of 18, she married Dawood Peer, an ear, nose and throat doctor, in an arranged marriage. She said in 2017 that he she would choose to marry him "10 times over". They have four children, two of whom are twins.

Peer is a strident opponent of Zionism and supports a one-state solution to the Israel–Palestine conflict.
