= Timeline of Durban =

Coordinates: 29.883333°S 31.05°E

The following is a timeline of the history of the city of Durban in the eThekwini Metropolitan Municipality, KwaZulu-Natal province, South Africa.

== 19th century ==
- 1824 - British settlement of Port Natal established on land "acquired...through treaties with the Zulu king Shaka."
- 1835 - Settlement renamed "D'Urban" after British colonial administrator Benjamin D'Urban.
- 1839
  - A small British military force was stationed at the port.
  - On its withdrawal Dutch emigrants from the Cape took possession and proclaimed the Natalia Republic.
- 1841 - Printing press in operation (approximate date).
- 1842
  - A British military force reoccupied Durban.
  - Treaty signed by the Dutch recognizing British sovereignty.
- 1846 - "Native reserves" created.
- 1851 - Natal Times newspaper begins publication.
- 1852 - Mercury newspaper begins publication.
- 1854
  - "First Town Council, consisting of 8 members representing four wards" created.
  - George Cato becomes mayor.
  - Natal Bank in business.
  - D'Urban Club formed.
- 1860
  - 26 June: Natal Railway (Market Square-Customs Point) begins operating in Durban.
  - Indian workers begin to arrive in Durban.
- 1863 - Population: approximately 5,000 (3,390 white, 1,380 black and 230 Asian).
- 1865 - Sites for Albert Park and Victoria Park established.
- 1866 - Durban High School was founded.
- 1870 - Durban Fire Department founded.
- 1877 - Durban Girls' College was founded.
- 1880 - Magazine Barracks built.
- 1882 - Durban High School for Girls was founded.
- 1885 - Town Hall built.
- 1888 - Lord's cricket ground established.
- 1889 - Natal cricket team formed.
- 1896 - Population: 31,877.
- 1899 - Maris Stella School was founded.

== 20th century ==
=== 1900s-1950s ===
- 1902 - Electric tram begins operating.
- 1903
  - Utrecht and Vryheid become part of city.
  - Indian Opinion newspaper begins publication.
- 1904
  - Zulu Ilanga lase Natal newspaper begins publication.
  - Indian leader Mahatma Gandhi establishes settlement at Phoenix.
  - Population: 67,842.
- 1908 - Union Whaling Station begins operating.
- 1910
  - Durban becomes part of newly formed Union of South Africa.
  - Glenwood High School was founded.
- 1911 - Population: 69,187 (31,783 white, 17,784 black, 19,620 Asian).
- 1914 - Indian Views newspaper begins publication.
- 1921
  - Clairwood Shree Siva Soobramoniar Temple built.
  - Comrades Marathon (Pietermaritzburg-Durban) begins.
- 1923 - Kingsmead Cricket Ground in use.
- 1924 - Clifton School was founded.
- 1926 - Memorial Cenotaph unveiled in Farewell Square.
- 1929 - St. Henry's Marist College was founded.
- 1931 - Natal University College Durban campus established.
- 1935 - Durban officially gained its city status.
- 1946 - Population: 338,817 city.
- 1949
  - Anti-Indian riot.
  - Electric tram stops operating.
- 1950 - Parliamentary Group Areas Act leads to urban apartheid.
- 1951 - November: World premiere of feature film Cry, the Beloved Country.
- 1953 - Northlands High School for Girls was founded.
- 1958 - Kings Park Stadium opens.

=== 1960s-1990s ===
- 1960
  - Ukhozi FM radio begins broadcasting.
  - African Art Centre established.
  - Population: 560,010 city; 681,492 metro.
- 1961
  - University College for Indians established on Salisbury Island.
  - Durban becomes part of the new Republic of South Africa.
- 1965 - Cinerama Theatre opens.
- 1966 - Brettonwood High School was founded.
- 1968 - Durban Heights water reservoir begins operating.
- 1970 - Population: 736,853 city; 850,946 metro.
- 1972 - University of Durban-Westville opens.
- 1973 - 1973 Durban strikes
- 1977 - Durban Container Terminal begins operating at the Port of Durban.
- 1978 - 8 January: Academic Rick Turner assassinated.
- 1985
  - Anti-Indian unrest.
  - 23 December: Amanzimtoti bombing occurs near Durban.
  - Population: 634,301 city; 982,075 metro.
- 1986 - 14 June: Durban beach-front bombing occurs.
- 1990
  - "Separate Amenities Act was repealed, thus opening up Durban’s facilities to all races."
  - Northwood School was founded.
- 1991 - Population: 715,669 city; 1,137,378 metro.
- 1993
  - June: 1993 African Championships in Athletics held in Durban.
  - Pavilion shopping centre in business in Westville.
- 1995 - Sharks (rugby union) formed.
- 1996
  - Part of 1996 Africa Cup of Nations football contest played in Durban.
  - Obed Mlaba becomes mayor.
  - City website Durban.gov.za launched (approximate date).
  - Population: 669,242.
- 1997 - International Convention Centre opens.
- 1998 - September: International summit of the Non-Aligned Movement held in city.
- 1999 - November: Commonwealth Heads of Government Meeting 1999 held in city.
- 2000
  - July: XIII International AIDS Conference, 2000 held in city.
  - 5 December: South African municipal elections, 2000 held.
  - Durban becomes seat of newly created eThekwini Metropolitan Municipality.

== 21st century ==
- 2001
  - UN World Conference against Racism 2001 held in city.
  - Population: 536,644 city.
  - Gateway shopping centre in business in nearby Umhlanga.
- 2002
  - 6 February: 2002 Charlotte's Dale train collision occurs in vicinity of Durban.
  - 9 July: African Union launched in Durban.
- 2003
  - Dolphins cricket team formed.
  - Part of 2003 Cricket World Cup played in Durban.
- 2004
  - University of KwaZulu-Natal established.
  - uShaka Marine World theme park in business.
- 2005 - 19 March: Demonstration at Kennedy Road shack settlement.
- 2006
  - February: Strike at the University of KwaZulu-Natal.
  - 1 March: South African municipal elections, 2006 held.
- 2007 - Eden College was founded.
- 2008 - Ulwazi Programme for local history launched.
- 2009
  - 24 September: Airplane crash occurs.
  - 26 September: Ethnic attack on Kennedy Road shack settlement.
  - Moses Mabhida Stadium opens in Stamford Hill.
- 2010
  - King Shaka International Airport opens.
  - Part of 2010 FIFA World Cup football contest played in Durban.
  - Field Band Academy founded.
- 2011
  - 18 May: South African municipal elections, 2011 held.
  - November–December: 2011 United Nations Climate Change Conference held in city.
  - James Nxumalo becomes mayor.
  - Population: 595,061 city; 3,442,361 metro.
- 2013
  - March: International 5th BRICS summit held in city.
  - Part of 2013 Africa Cup of Nations football contest played in Durban.
- 2016
  - 3 August: South African municipal elections, 2016 held.
  - 2016 African Championships in Athletics held in city.
  - Zandile Gumede becomes mayor.
- 2017 - March: Durban bid for the 2022 Commonwealth Games rejected.

== See also ==
- Durban history (fr)
- List of mayors of Durban
- Timelines of other cities in South Africa: Cape Town, Gqeberha, Johannesburg, Pietermaritzburg, Pretoria

== Bibliography ==
=== published in 19th-20th centuries ===
- J. Forsyth Ingram (1895). "Durban". Colony of Natal: an official illustrated handbook and railway guide. London.
- "Principal Towns in Natal: Durban", Natal Almanac Directory and Yearly Register, Pietermaritzburg: P. Davis & Sons, 1897
- W. P. M. Henderson (1904). Durban: Fifty Years' Municipal History. Durban: Robinson & Co.
- Twentieth Century Impressions of Natal: Its People, Commerce, Industries, and Resources. Twentieth Century Impressions. Lloyd's Greater Britain Publishing Company. 1906.
- "Durban" . Encyclopædia Britannica. Vol. 8 (11th ed.). 1910. pp. 696–697.
- "Durban" . Encyclopædia Britannica. Vol. 30 (12th ed.). 1922. p. 868.
- Leo Kuper; Hilstan Watts; Ronald Davies (1958). Durban: A study in racial ecology. Jonathan Cape. OCLC 958188774.
- P. Maylam (1982). "Shackled by the Contradictions: The Municipal Response to African Urbanization in Durban, c. 1920-1950". African Urban Studies. Michigan State University. ISSN 0736-6760.
- Dowlat Ramdas Bagwandeen (1983). The question of 'Indian penetration' in the Durban area and Indian politics, 1940-1946 (PhD). University of Natal. hdl:10413/8711.
- Paul Maylam (1985), "Aspects of African Urbanization in the Durban Area before 1940", in Richard Haines; Gina Buijs (eds.), Struggle for Social and Economic Space: Urbanization in Twentieth Century South Africa, University of Durban-Westville, ISBN 0-949947-73-3
- R. Posel (1985). "Durban Ricksha Pullers' Strikes of 1918 and 1930". Journal of Natal and Zulu History. 8. University of Natal: 85–106. doi:10.1080/02590123.1985.11964240. ISSN 0259-0123.
- R.J. Davies (1991). "Durban". In Anthony Lemon (ed.). Homes Apart: South Africa's Segregated Cities. Indiana University Press. ISBN 0-253-33321-0.
- Timothy Andrew Nuttall (1991). Class, race and nation: African politics in Durban, 1929-1949 (PhD). University of Oxford.
- David Hemson (1996). "Beyond the Frontier of Control: Trade Unionism and the Labour Market in the Durban Docks". Transformation: Critical Perspectives on Southern Africa (30). University of Natal. ISSN 0258-7696 – via African e-Journals Project.
- Paul Maylam; Iain Edwards, eds. (1996). The People's City: African Life in Twentieth-century Durban. University of Natal Press. ISBN 978-0-86980-934-1.
- Nelson Tozivaripi Sambureni (1997). The apartheid city and its labouring class: African workers and the independent trade union movement in Durban, 1959-1985 (PhD). University of South Africa – via Disa.ukzn.ac.za.

=== published in 21st century ===
- Bill Freund (2001). "Contrasts in Urban Segregation: A Tale of Two African Cities, Durban (South Africa) and Abidjan (Côte d'Ivoire)". Journal of Southern African Studies. 27 (3): 527–546. doi:10.1080/13632430120074572. JSTOR 823314. PMID 17650571. S2CID 37285422.
- Antoine Bouillon (2002). "Citizenship and the city: the Durban centre-city in 2000". Transformation (48). University of Natal. ISSN 0258-7696 – via African e-Journals Project.
- Bill Freund; Vishnu Padayachee, eds. (2002). (D)urban Vortex: South African City in Transition. University of Natal Press.
- Brij Maharaj (2002), "Post Apartheid Metro Boundaries: Conflicts, Contestations and Compromises in Durban", Rencontres scientifiques franco-Sud-Africaines de l'innovation territoriale, p. 22 – via Halshs.archives-ouvertes.fr
- "Durban". Understanding Slums: Case Studies for the Global Report 2003. United Nations Human Settlements Programme and University College London. 2003.
- Cherl Hendricks (2003). "Durban, South Africa". In Paul Tiyambe Zeleza; Dickson Eyoh (eds.). Encyclopedia of Twentieth-Century African History. Routledge. ISBN 0-415-23479-4.
- Exit, Voice and Tradition: Loyalty to Chieftainship and Democracy in Metropolitan Durban, South Africa, London: Crisis States Research Centre, 2005 – via International Relations and Security Network
- Aran S. MacKinnon (2005). "Durban". In Kevin Shillington (ed.). Encyclopedia of African History. Fitzroy Dearborn. ISBN 978-1-57958-245-6.
- Kate Tuttle (2005). "Durban". In Kwame Anthony Appiah; Henry Louis Gates (eds.). Africana: The Encyclopedia of the African and African American Experience (2nd ed.). Oxford University Press. ISBN 978-0-19-517055-9.
- Bill Freund (2007). "Globalisation and the African city: Touba, Abidjan, Durban". The African City: A History. Cambridge University Press. p. 177+. ISBN 978-0-521-52792-7.
- Case study: Metropolitan Governance, EThekwini (Durban), South Africa, United Nations Human Settlements Programme, 2015
- Ralph Callebert (2017). On Durban's Docks: Zulu Workers, Rural Households, Global Labor. Rochester NY: University of Rochester Press. ISBN 978-1-58046-907-4.
