= Controversies at the University of KwaZulu-Natal =

There have been a number of controversies at the University of KwaZulu-Natal since its foundation. Firstly, there have been several strikes and demonstrations on the part of both staff and students. Some strikes from 2009 onward have involved police intervention and the use of riot control measures, as well as violence on the part of some strikers. Secondly, there have been a series of legal and disciplinary actions taken by senior university management against academics for speaking in public about the university. These actions have drawn wide criticism, both from academics and from organizations such as Cosatu and UNESCO.

== Strikes ==
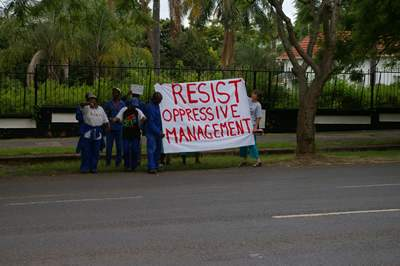
Staff on strike in 2006

=== 2006 strikes ===
On Thursday, 2 February 2006, the four unions at UKZN (COMSA, NEHAWU, NTESU, and UNSU) served notice to University Management that they would commence strike on Monday, 6 February 2006. The immediate grievance was the sub-inflationary wage increases of the general staff while senior management was given bonuses. However, the unions also cited the "corporatization" of the university and the rise of an "authoritarian style of Management" as wider concerns. The strike was timed with the first week of the academic year (registration week) in order to demonstrate seriousness.

The strike had a strong unifying effect on staff, bringing them together across race, class and employment categories. During the strike, Professor Dasarath Chetty, director of public relations, circulated emails to staff threatening to dock pay for time spent not at work, and instructing them not to speak to the press about the strike. Students also joined in on strike, with approximately 1000 students participating during one day on the Pietermaritzburg campus. On 16 February 2006, two weeks after the start of the strike, the unions and management reached an agreement and issued a joint press release suspending the strike. The release also pledged to "develop processes for the full engagement of all issues raised" during the strike.

=== 2009 March strikes ===
In March 2009, police fired rubber bullets and teargas at students that had turned violent at the Howard College campus. The students had been protesting since 17 March 2009 over accommodation, financial aid, and student exclusions and had handed a memorandum of demands to the university's management on 19 March. A blind student was shot in the back with a rubber bullet by police, and nonstriking students were forced to leave lecture venues as a result of the strike action.

=== 2010 March–April strikes ===
On 9 March 2010, student strikes at the Howard College campus caused lectures and tests to be canceled. The strike - called by the students' representative council in support of their call for adequate transport for disabled students, among other demands - was declared illegal by the university.

The strikes ended officially on 14 April, with the Student Representative Council holding strikes on different campuses on different days of the week, suspending only on 13 April when the SRC agreed to meet with management to discuss their complaints.

=== 2010 September strikes ===
On Monday, 6 September 2010, protests sparked against what students said was an attempt by the varsity to privatize accommodation started at the Westville campus. The demonstrations then spread to the Howard College and Pietermaritzburg campuses on 8 September. 8 students were arrested after a security guard was assaulted on the Pietermaritzburg campus. A number of tests at the Westville campus were postponed as a result of the strike.

=== 2011 March–April financial aid strikes ===
Student strikes over financial aid in March/April 2011 lead to the police action on all of the UKZN campuses. Police used rubber bullets and tear gas to control students leaving many students injured. 150 students were arrested and charged with public violence. At the time of the strikes, UKZN had an interim interdict preventing students from striking on any one of the five campuses of UKZN.

Toward the end of March, all five campuses were closed due to the violence of the protests, and striking and police presence turned Howard College Campus into a 'battlefield'.

Police were accused of using 'heavy-handed tactics' against protesting students, specifically shooting students with rubber bullets at close range. Two students were hospitalized, awaiting treatment after being shot by police. Nkosinathi Jele was admitted to Addington Hospital, awaiting an operation for two rubber bullets to be removed from his left upper thigh. Another unnamed student was transferred to St Augustine's Hospital after he was shot in his penis.

== Actions taken against academics ==
=== Freedom of expression ===
In 2006, the International Freedom of Expression Exchange stated that "Free expression and academic freedom are in severe decline at the university."

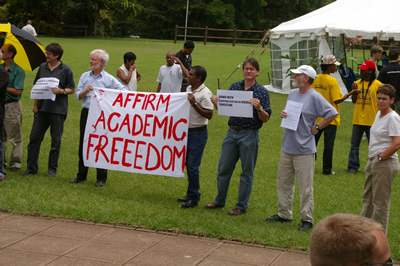
Academics striking for academic freedom in the 2006 strike. On the right of the sign, holding it up, is Nithaya Chetty. Next on the right (on his left) is John van den Berg.

In 2007, the Freedom of Expression Institute was concerned about the university's suspension of professor Evan Mantzaris for criticizing management, "part of a larger process in which the space for free expression and academic freedom at that university is being narrowed".

In 2008, Education Minister Naledi Pandor wanted to meet vice-chancellor Malegapuru Makgoba and discuss resignations of staff overexpression concerns and the condemnation from Cosatu and the Freedom of Expression Institute for the punishment of academics. See below for more information on the resignations of staff and punishment of academics by the university.

=== UKZN disciplinary action against professors ===
The University of KwaZulu-Natal brought charges in August 2008 against scientists Nithaya Chetty and John van den Berg for 'not exercising due care in communicating with the media' and bringing the university into disrepute. Van den Berg, professor of mathematics, has signed a settlement agreement terminating disciplinary hearings against him, while Chetty, an associate professor and president of the SA Institute of Physics, elected to resign on the advice of his attorney and union representative.

The charges against Chetty and Van den Berg arose out of comments by the two men, published in the press and on the university's "Change" listserv in March and April. The comments were critical of UKZN vice-chancellor Malegapuru Makgoba's alleged repeated attempts to block from the senate agenda a faculty of Science and Agriculture submission on academic freedom, which refers to a "prevailing culture of incivility and racial stereotyping that further impedes the free exchange of ideas" at the university.

Academics and staff were banned by Makgoba from meeting to discuss the disciplinary action against the professors.

The events put the University of KwaZulu-Natal and Malegapuru Makgoba in the international spotlight when 35 professors from around the world wrote an open letter to Mr. Mac Mia, Chair of Council of the University of KwaZulu-Natal, and Professor Malegapuru William Makgoba urging them to reconsider their treatment of academics and the state of academical freedom at the university. The letter stated: "We do not wish to review the specific charges brought against Chetty and van den Berg; rather, we are deeply concerned that the adjudication processes set in motion by UKZN's leaders run in the face of globally recognized standards regarding the rights of academic staff to speak and act on policies of their institutions and of higher education in particular and to maintain core responsibility for the review and discipline of academic colleagues."

The authors went on to cite various UNESCO statements commenting that '"These standards recognize that the protection of the rights of expression of academic staff is both fundamental to democratic institutions in a democratic society and also essential to success of institutions of higher education. The UNESCO recommendations hold that academic staff:"

The authors of the letter also expressed deep concern in the fact that the leadership of the University of KwaZulu-Natal had violated "deeply held standards": "We have deep concerns that the processes established by the leadership of the University violate broadly and deeply held standards of governance which give a central responsibility to, and broad freedom for, academic staff in the conduct of academic governance in institutions of higher education."

The authors concluded:

"In respect of these standards, and with concern for the future of the University of KwaZulu-Natal in the worlds of scientific and humanistic learning and research, we respectfully ask you, first, to reconsider the process you have proposed; second, to restate the University's commitment to academic freedom, including the rights of academic staff to review, criticize, and debate the policies and directions of their institutions; and, third, to reaffirm the University's commitment to standards of university governance consonant with the standards recognized by the UNESCO Statement of 11 November 1997."

The letter was signed by 35 professors named below with their institution:

- William Beinart, University of Oxford;
- Stephanie M.H. Camp, Rice University;
- James T. Campbell, Stanford University;
- David William Cohen, Paul N. Edwards, Geoff Eley, Gabrielle Hecht, Daniel Herwitz, Anthea Patricia Josias, Regina Morantz-Sanchez, Lucia Saks, Scott Spector, Penny M. Von Eschen, David A. Wallace all of the University of Michigan;
- Jean Comaroff, Chicago Center for Contemporary Theory and New York University;
- Fernando Coronil, City University of New York;
- Donald L. Donham, University of California, Davis;
- Gillian Hart, University of California, Berkeley;
- Chris Benner, University of California;
- Keith Hart, University of London;
- Preben Kaarsholm, Corinne A. Kratz all of Emory University;
- Pier M. Larson, Johns Hopkins University;
- David Lyon, Queen's University;
- Shula Marks, University of London;
- James Oakes, Graduate Center of the City of New York
- Tejumola Olaniyan, University of Wisconsin;
- Derek R. Peterson, Dr. Simon Szreter, Dr. Christopher Warnes all of the University of Cambridge;
- Jonathan Sadowsk, Case Western Reserve University;
- Lynn M. Thomas, University of Washington;
- Luise White, University of Florida;
- Kwame Anthony Appiah, Princeton University;

=== Eviction of shack dwellers and the firing of Fazel Khan ===
In 2005 vice-chancellor Malegapuru Makgoba tried to have three families, living in shacks on the Westville campus, evicted.

UKZN academics Fazel Khan and Sally Giles directed a documentary film about Abahlali baseMjondolo, a shack dwellers' movement. When Khan was excised from both the photo and text in an article about the documentary in the university newsletter UKZNdaba, he was charged with dishonest conduct because he told newspapers that he believed that he had been excised from the photograph and text by the university management due to his role in the staff strike of 2006. Khan was found guilty of bringing the university into disrepute and fired. The Mercury had previously reported that vice-chancellor Makgoba had publicly declared that, following a request from Mayor Obed Mlaba, he would charge Khan and 2 other academics working with Abahlali baseMjondolo for 'incitement'. Khan is currently suing the university for unfair dismissal.

== Animal Cruelty ==
There have been two major cases of animal cruelty by students of the University of KwaZulu-Natal.

=== Microwaving of a cat by UKZN students ===
In May 2005, the pet cat of a campus security chief's family was killed by students from the Pinewood men's residence for student teachers on the UKZN Edgewood Campus when they cooked her in a microwave oven. The cat was said to have died an "extremely painful death".

The management of the university condemned the "barbaric" act, and an officer of the SPCA, Roland Fivaz, said "it was particularly disturbing that some students laughed about the incident at a meeting". An outcome of the investigation into the killing of the cat by the SPCA and RMS was not reported.

=== Killing of a monkey by UKZN students ===
On 18 September 2011, the killing of a monkey on the Westville campus was reported. Witnesses reported seeing four of five male students trapping a monkey inside a communal kitchen inside one of the campus halls of residence. The students were alleged to have started beating the animal with a stick, continuing to do so until they thought it was dead. Witnesses said the animal then began to crawl away with a broken spine; the students were alleged to have continued hitting the monkey until it was dead. One witness said, 'monkey was screaming so loudly that it could be heard inside some of the residence blocks'.

The incident leads to a 'national outcry' and protests at the entrances of the Westville and Howard campuses. The protesters demanded brutality against animals to stop at university and that the university bring justice to those to have committed the alleged killing. A similar incident in 2005 involved students cooking a cat alive in a microwave further aggravated the situation, as this was seen as a further example of animal cruelty by students of UKZN. The university was smashed for turning a 'blind eye' to animal cruelty, and the university was criticized for not disciplining the alleged culprits.

The university reported that the perpetrators claimed that they were "unaware that beating the monkey constituted cruelty to animals". There was also uncertainty into whether the monkey was killed or not, but students at the university who witnessed the incident were adamant that the monkey was, in fact, dead when the beatings stopped and stated that the perpetrators were "obviously denying that they killed it".

The SPCA and Monkey Helpline were heavily involved in the case.
