= Mbali Frazer =

South African politician and former educator

Mbali Frazer MPL

KwaZulu-Natal MEC for Education
- In office 11 August 2022 – 14 June 2024
- Premier: Nomusa Dube-Ncube
- Preceded by: Kwazi Mshengu
- Succeeded by: Sipho Hlomuka

Member of the KwaZulu-Natal Legislature
- Incumbent
- Assumed office 21 May 2014

Personal details
- Born: Mbalenhle Cleopatra Frazer
- Party: African National Congress
- Profession: Educator, politician

Mbalenhle Cleopatra Frazer, commonly known as Mbali Frazer, is a South African politician and former educator who was KwaZulu-Natal's Member of the Executive Council (MEC) for Education from August 2022 until June 2024. She has served in the KwaZulu-Natal Legislature as an African National Congress MPL since 2014. Frazer was elected deputy provincial chairperson of the African National Congress Women's League in August 2023.

== Career in the ANC ==
Frazer is a former teacher and trade unionist. In 2014, Frazer was elected to the KwaZulu-Natal Legislature on the ticket of the African National Congress. Frazer supported Nkosazana Dlamini-Zuma's unsuccessful ANC presidential campaign in 2017. She was re-elected to the provincial legislature in 2019 and then elected as the chairperson of the public works committee. When Dlamini-Zuma came under scrutiny during the COVID-19 lockdown in 2020, Frazer came to her defence.

At the provincial African National Congress Women's League elective conference held from 4 to 7 August 2023, Frazer successfully contested the position of deputy provincial chairperson. She defeated Phumzile Mbatha-Cele for the position, winning with 649 votes to Mbatha-Cele's 545.

== Provincial government ==
Following the resignation of Sihle Zikalala as the premier of KwaZulu-Natal on 5 August 2022, Frazer, ANC MPL Amanda Mapena and Finance MEC Nomusa Dube-Ncube were shortlisted by the provincial ANC as possible candidates to succeed Zikalala. The premier's position ultimately went to Dube-Ncube. Following Dube-Ncube's election and inauguration, she named her executive council on 11 August 2022. Frazer was appointed as the MEC for Education, succeeding Kwazi Mshengu. Trade unions welcomed her appointment.

Frazer was re-elected to her seat in the provincial legislature in the 2024 provincial election, however, she was not reappointed to the Executive Council.
