= Inchanga =

Inchanga iNtshanga
- iNchanga
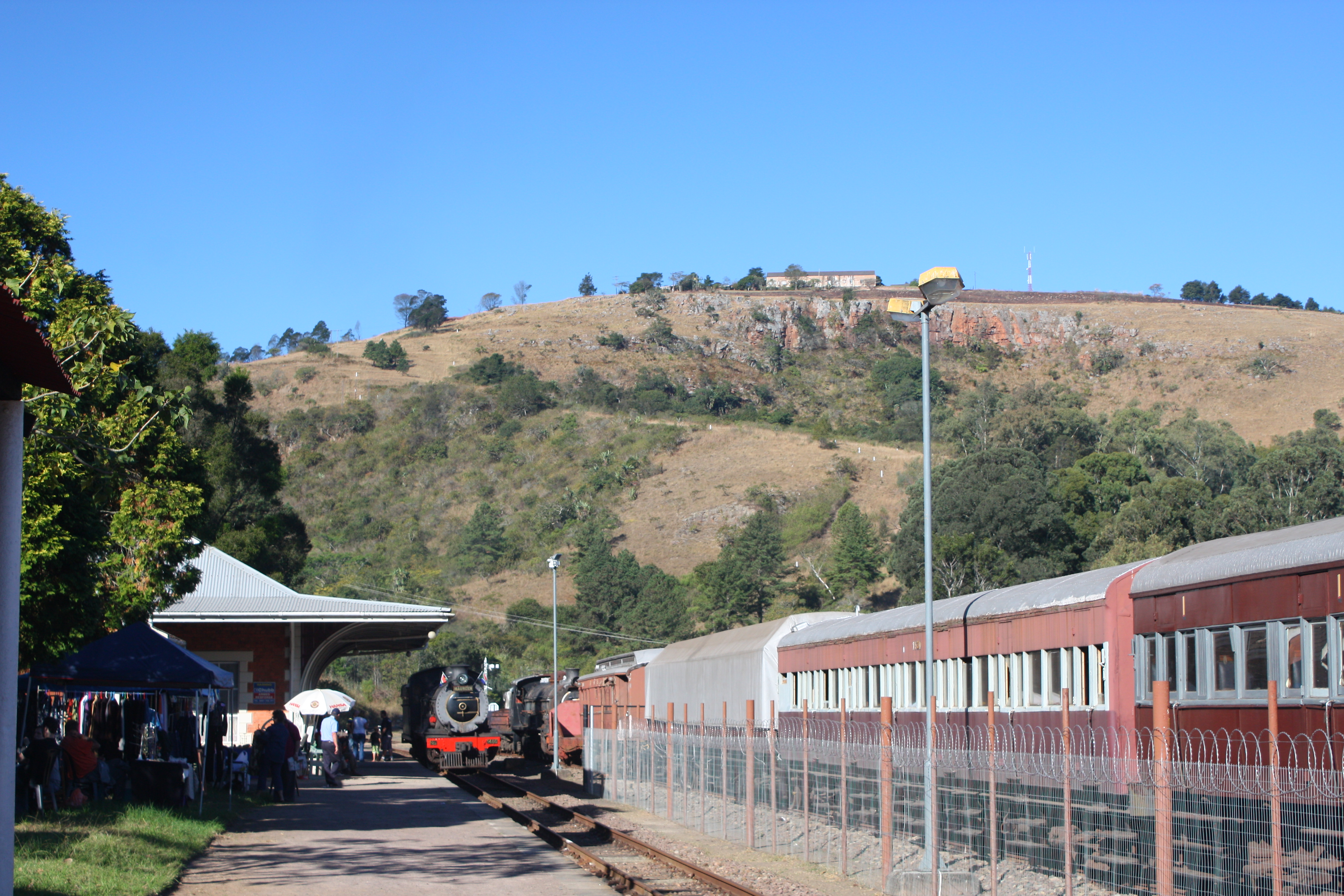
- Inchanga train station

- Location within KwaZulu-Natal Location within South Africa
- Coordinates: 29°44′27″S 30°40′42″E
- Country: South Africa
- Province: KwaZulu-Natal
- Municipality: eThekwini
  - Councillor: (SACP)

Area
  - Total: 3.29 km^{2} (1.27 sq mi)

Population (2011)
  - Total: 1,008
  - Density: 306/km^{2} (794/sq mi)

Racial makeup (2011)
  - Black African: 19.5%
  - Coloured: 1.2%
  - Indian/Asian: 2.4%
  - White: 76.3%
  - Other: 0.6%

First languages (2011)
  - English: 77.2%
  - Zulu: 13.4%
  - Afrikaans: 6.3%
  - Other: 3.2%
- Time zone: UTC+2 (SAST)
- PO box: 3706
- Area code: 031

Intshanga is a village in KwaZulu-Natal, South Africa, approximately halfway between Durban and Pietermaritzburg.

== Schools ==
Inchanga has several schools, including

- Rietvallei Combined School
- Siphesihle High School,
- Inchanga Primary School
- Zifikele High School
- MbaliYezwe Primary School
- KwaXimba Combined School

== Notable people ==
- Dawude Phungula
- James Nxumalo
- Obed Mlaba
- Thobelani Qephu

== History ==
Intshanga was noted as the location of a 27 meters (89 ft) tall rail viaduct that was poorly constructed and required extremely slow crossing (10km/h), and if the wind speed exceeded 15km/h the passengers were made to walk across the bridge, after which the train followed.

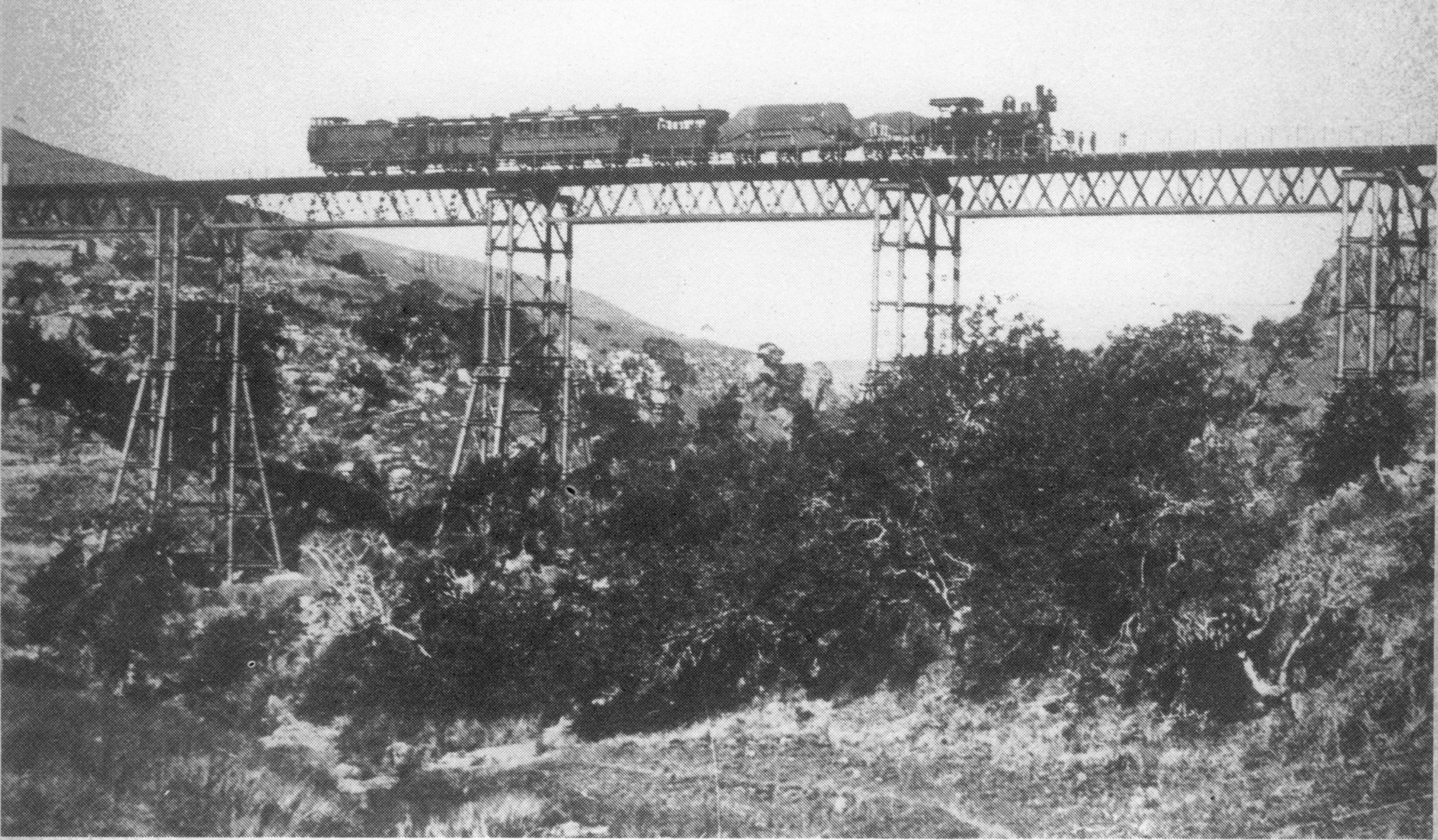
Inchanga viaduct, c. 1880

An alternate route around the ravine made the bridge obsolete in 1892, and a train station was built nearby in 1895. A hotel was built near the train station in 1903, but 20 years later a new rail line was built some distance away and business suffered. Both the hotel and the train station have been restored and are operating in their original function. The station serves as the midpoint on the excursion trips of the Umgeni Steam Railway.
