= Vause Raw =

South African politician (1921–2001)

Vause Raw DMS

Senator for Natal
- In office 1955–1958

Member of the House of Assembly for Durban Point
- In office 1958–1987
- Preceded by: Vernon Shearer
- Succeeded by: J. C. Mathee

Leader of the New Republic Party
- In office 1977–1984
- Succeeded by: Sutton, B

Personal details
- Born: Wyatt Vause Raw; 21 September 1921 Durban, Natal, Union of South Africa
- Died: 13 March 2001 (aged 79) Durban, KwaZulu-Natal, South Africa
- Party: United Party; New Republic Party
- Spouse: Barbara Airelle Giles

Wyatt Vause Raw (21 September 1921 – 13 March 2001) was a conservative opposition South African politician of the Apartheid era. He was a prominent member of the United Party from the 1940s to the late 1970s, and the leader of the succeeding New Republic Party (NRP).

== Early life ==
Raw was born in Durban, Natal in 1921. He matriculated from Pretoria Boys High and subsequently attended the University of the Witwatersrand and the Johannesburg Teachers' Training College before enlisting with the South African forces in May 1940, and went on to serve in the military in central Africa, Egypt and Europe.

He joined his father in a farming and trading venture from 1946 to 1950, served as secretary to the Pretoria District Farmers' Union, and was appointed a director of the Waterberg Farmers' Co-operative. In 1954, he became sales manager of a textile knitting mill, and from 1956 to 1981 ran his own textile and clothing machinery agency.

== Politics ==
Raw was known for his support of ex-servicemen. He published Flares, a collection of war poems written during his military service.

He was vice chairman of the United Party's Pretoria District and was elected to the divisional committee in 1948, where he served until 1950. In 1951, he was appointed Natal secretary of the party. He became a Senator for Natal in 1955, and won the Durban Point parliamentary seat for the party in 1958. He became the party's official spokesperson on defence and transport. In that position, he cooperated well with the National Party's Minister of Defence, even managing to secure concessions such as amendments to bills.

Helen Suzman characterised Raw as a "very right-wing United Party member", and identified him as one of the reasons she left the party.

The United Party disbanded in 1977. Its successor, the NRP, elected Raw as national chairman in 1978, and as its national leader later in the same year. Raw discredited the party in a string of by-election defeats from 1977 to 1980, by making "extravagant" claims of support and predicting victory in areas where the party had no prospects. He nevertheless continued in his capacity as leader until 1984.

He served for many years in the whites-only parliament as the Member of Parliament for Durban's Point constituency. In 1985, he was awarded the Decoration for Meritorious Services; he was the first serving opposition MP to receive it. He was also a lifelong honorary colonel of 38 Field Workshop Regiment. He retired from Parliament just before the 1987 general election.

== Death ==
He died in March 2001 after a long illness. Twice married, he was the father of seven children.
