= Durban Point (House of Assembly of South Africa constituency) =

- Durban-Punt
- Former constituency for the South African House of Assembly
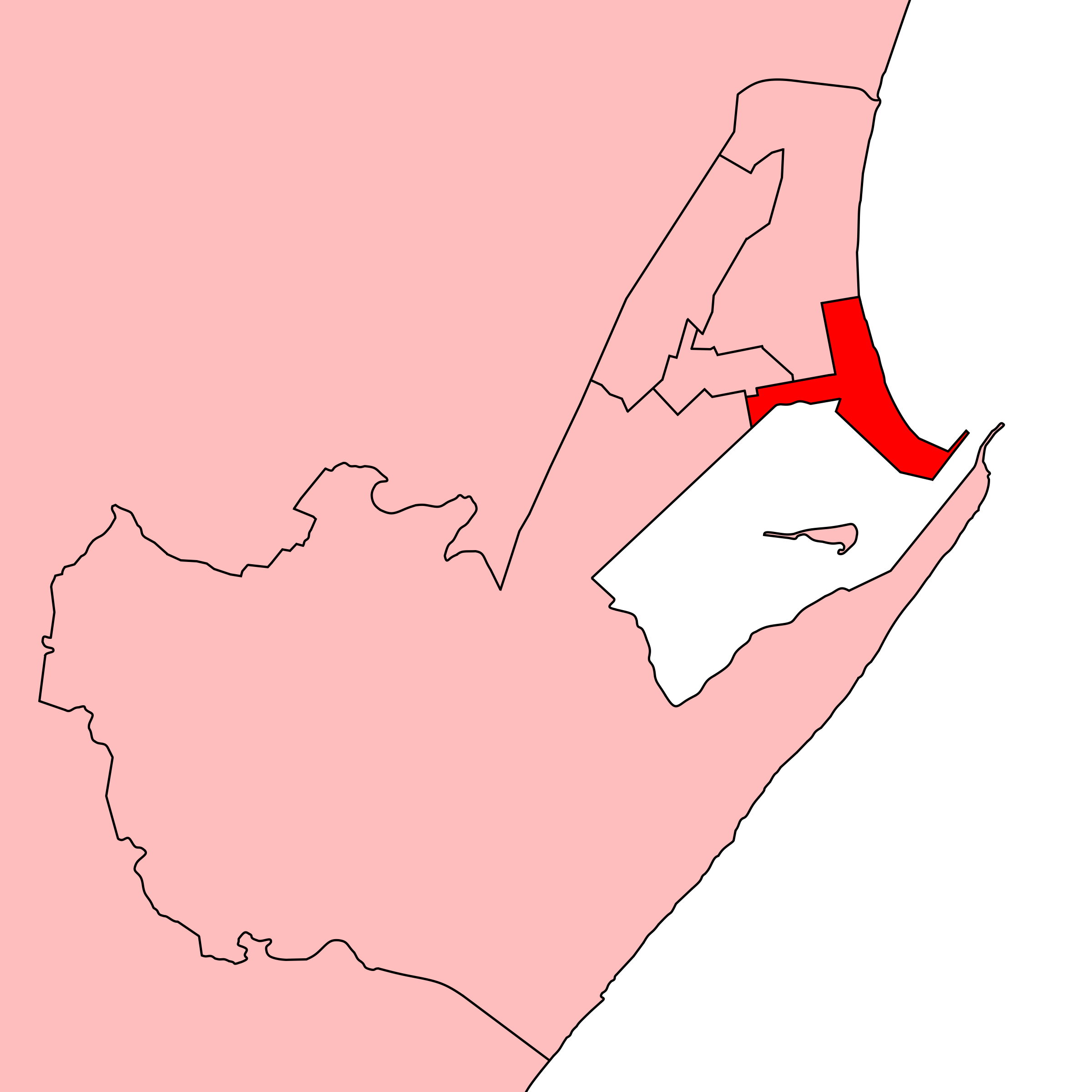
- Location of Durban Point within Durban (1910)
- Province: Natal
- Electorate: 17,001 (1989)

Former constituency
- Created: 1910
- Abolished: 1994
- Number of members: 1
- Last MHA: (NP)
- Replaced by: KwaZulu-Natal

Durban Point (Afrikaans: Durban-Punt) was a constituency in the Natal Province of South Africa, which existed from 1910 to 1994. Named for the Point area of central Durban, it initially covered the eastern part of the CBD, but later expanded to cover much of Durban’s northern waterfront. Throughout its existence it elected one member to the House of Assembly.

== Franchise notes ==
When the Union of South Africa was formed in 1910, the electoral qualifications in use in each pre-existing colony were kept in place. The franchise used in the Natal Colony, while theoretically not restricted by race, was significantly less liberal than that of the Cape, and no more than a few hundred non-white electors ever qualified. In 1908, an estimated 200 of the 22,786 electors in the colony were of non-European descent, and by 1935, only one remained. By 1958, when the last non-white voters in the Cape were taken off the rolls, Natal too had an all-white electorate. The franchise was also restricted by property and education qualifications until the 1933 general election, following the passage of the Women's Enfranchisement Act, 1930 and the Franchise Laws Amendment Act, 1931. From then on, the franchise was given to all white citizens aged 21 or over, which remained the case until the end of apartheid and the introduction of universal suffrage in 1994.

== History ==
Like the rest of Durban, Durban Point was a largely English-speaking seat. In its first years, it was a marginal seat, electing a Labour member in 1920 but otherwise returning members from the South African Party and its predecessors. After the abolition of Stamford Hill constituency in 1943, the Point constituency expanded to take in much of Durban’s affluent northern suburbs, and became a far more conservative seat as a result. Its member between 1958 and 1987, Vause Raw, was a key figure of the United Party’s conservative faction, and later became the leader of the New Republic Party. When Raw retired in 1987, the seat was captured by the National Party under J. C. Mathee, who would hold it until its abolition in 1994.

== Members ==
Election	Member	Party
1910	P. A. Silburn	Unionist
1915	P. A. Silburn	Independent
1920	Archibald Jamieson	Labour
1921	Walter Greenacre	South African
1924	A. M. Miller	South African
1929	V. L. Nicoll	South African
1933	T. M. Wadley	South African
1934	T. M. Wadley	United
1938	Vernon Shearer	Dominion
1943	Vernon Shearer	Independent
1948	Vernon Shearer	United Party
1953	Vernon Shearer	United Party
1954	Vernon Shearer	National Conservative
1958	Vause Raw	United Party
1961	Vause Raw	United Party
1966	Vause Raw	United Party
1970	Vause Raw	United Party
1974	Vause Raw	United Party
1977	Vause Raw	New Republic
1981	Vause Raw	New Republic
1987	J. C. Mathee	National
1989	J. C. Mathee	National
1994	Constituency abolished	

== Detailed results ==
=== Elections in the 1910s ===
General election 1910: Durban Point
Party	Candidate	Votes	%	±%
Unionist	P. A. Silburn	788	58.7	New
Labour	C. H. Knowler	554	41.3	New
Majority		234	17.4	N/A
Unionist win (new seat)				

General election 1915: Durban Point
Party	Candidate	Votes	%	±%
Independent	P. A. Silburn	1,059	67.8	−6.1
Labour	H. Humphrey	498	31.9	+5.8
Independent	J. E. Palmer	5	0.3	New
Majority		561	35.9	−11.9
Turnout		1,562	72.1	N/A
Independent gain from Unionist		Swing	-5.9	

=== Elections in the 1920s ===
General election 1920: Durban Point
Party	Candidate	Votes	%	±%
Labour	Archibald Jamieson	941	49.2	+17.3
South African	H. G. MacKeurtan	846	44.3	New
Independent	H. B. Bradford	124	6.5	New
Majority		95	4.9	−31.0
Turnout		1,562	65.6	−5.5
Labour gain from Independent		Swing	N/A	

General election 1921: Durban Point
Party	Candidate	Votes	%	±%
South African	Walter Greenacre	1,069	54.4	+10.1
Labour	Archibald Jamieson	745	37.9	−11.3
Independent	S. M. Pettersen	94	4.8	New
Independent	P. A. Silburn	58	3.0	New
Majority		324	16.5	N/A
Turnout		1,966	60.5	−5.1
South African gain from Labour		Swing	+10.7	

General election 1924: Durban Point
Party	Candidate	Votes	%	±%
South African	A. M. Miller	736	43.5	−10.9
Labour	Archibald Jamieson	522	30.9	−7.0
Independent	H. H. Kemp	429	25.4	New
Rejected ballots		4	0.2	N/A
Majority		214	12.6	−3.9
Turnout		1,691	80.1	+19.6
South African hold		Swing	-2.0	

General election 1929: Durban Point
Party	Candidate	Votes	%	±%
South African	V. L. Nicoll	1,719	67.8	+24.3
Labour (N.C.)	W. Wanless	786	31.1	+0.2
Rejected ballots		24	0.9	+0.7
Majority		933	34.7	+22.1
Turnout		2,529	73.4	−6.7
South African hold		Swing	+11.1	

=== Elections in the 1930s ===
General election 1933: Durban Point
Party	Candidate	Votes	%	±%
South African	T. M. Wadley	2,204	63.6	−4.2
Independent	J. E. Hay	1,217	35.1	New
Rejected ballots		43	1.3	+0.4
Majority		987	28.5	N/A
Turnout		3,464	53.6	−19.8
South African hold		Swing	N/A	

General election 1938: Durban Point
Party	Candidate	Votes	%	±%
Dominion	Vernon Shearer	3,201	55.0	New
United	O. Shearer	2,072	35.6	−28.0
Labour	J. J. de Smidt	397	6.8	New
Independent	R. S. Webb	75	1.3	New
Independent	P. H. Tomlinson	47	0.8	New
Rejected ballots		27	0.5	N/A
Majority		1,129	19.4	N/A
Turnout		5,819	73.5	+19.9
Dominion gain from United		Swing	N/A	
