= Kwazi Mshengu =

South African politician (born 1984)

KwaZulu-Natal MEC for Education
- In office 27 May 2019 – 11 August 2022
- Premier: Sihle Zikalala
- Preceded by: Mthandeni Dlungwane
- Succeeded by: Mbali Frazer

Member of the KwaZulu-Natal Legislature
- In office 22 May 2019 – 14 February 2023

Personal details
- Born: Kwazikwenkosi Innocent Mshengu; 10 November 1984 (age 41) Mooi River, Natal Province, South Africa
- Party: African National Congress
- Spouse: Nneileng
- Children: 2
- Education: University of KwaZulu-Natal

Kwazikwenkosi Innocent Mshengu (born 10 November 1984) is a South African lawyer and African National Congress politician who served as the Member of the Executive Council (MEC) for Education in KwaZulu-Natal until 11 August 2022 when he was replaced with Mbali Frazer by the new KwaZulu-Natal Premier Nomusa Dube-Ncube. He served as a member of the KwaZulu-Natal Legislature from May 2019 until February 2023. Mshengu is the provincial chairperson of the African National Congress Youth League.

== Early life and education ==
Mshengu was born on 10 November 1984 in Mooi River in the former Natal Province. He attended farm schools in the area for his primary education. In 2001, he matriculated at Dabulamanzi Combined School. In 2002, Mshengu started university at the University of KwaZulu-Natal and graduated with a bachelor of laws (LLB) degree. He also obtained an honours degree in policy and development studies at the university. In 2017, Mshengu received a master of laws (LLM) degree, also from the university.

== Career ==
From 2006 to 2008, Mshengu served as the president of UKZN's SRC. He was then the regional secretary of the ANC's Moses Mabhida region from 2007 to 2009. Mshengu was elected as the provincial chairperson of the African National Congress Youth League in 2017. The following year, he was elected to the ANC's provincial executive committee and the provincial working committee. He was also elected chair of the ANC's subcommittee on communications.

Additionally, Mshengu was employed as the commissioner for the KwaZulu-Natal Youth Commission in 2008. He was appointed as a deputy manager for skills development in the provincial Department of Health in 2009. Soon after, Mshengu worked for the ANC caucus in the provincial legislature from 2011 to 2013. Mshengu was the head of ministry at the provincial Department of Economic Development, Tourism and Environmental Affairs from June 2016 until his election to the KwaZulu-Natal Legislature in May 2019. The newly elected premier, Sihle Zikalala, named him Member of the Executive Council (MEC) for Education. Teachers unions welcomed his appointment.

After the death of Bheki Ntuli, the MEC for Transport Community Safety and Liaison, in January 2021, Mshengu was appointed as the acting MEC for the portfolio. He served until 9 March, when Peggy Nkonyeni was appointed to the position as part of a cabinet reshuffle done by premier Zikalala.

Prior to the ANC's provincial elective conference from 22 to 24 July 2022, Mshengu was on provincial chairperson Zikalala's "Ankole" slate, a group of candidates allied to party president Cyril Ramaphosa, as his preferred candidate for deputy provincial chairperson. On 23 July 2022, Mshengu was defeated by Health MEC Nomagugu Simelane-Zulu in the election for deputy provincial chairperson. Mshengu managed to receive only 661 votes, while Simelane-Zulu received 930 votes.

On 11 August 2022, Mshengu resigned as Education MEC ahead of the newly elected premier Nomusa Dube-Ncube's cabinet announcement. He was replaced by the former chairperson of the public works portfolio committee Mbali Frazer.

Mshenhu resigned from the provincial legislature on 14 February 2023.

== Personal life ==
Mshengu is married to Nneileng, and they have two daughters.
