= Vernon Shearer =

South African politician and Mayor of Durban

Vernon Lyall Shearer

Member of the House of Assembly for Durban Point
- In office 18 May 1938 – 16 April 1958
- Preceded by: Thomas Mansfield Wadley
- Succeeded by: Wyatt Vause Raw

Deputy Mayor of Durban
- In office 1963–1964

Mayor of Durban
- In office 1964–1966
- Preceded by: C. A. Milne
- Succeeded by: Margaret Maytom

Personal details
- Born: 1903 Durban, Colony of Natal
- Died: September 1968 (aged 64–65)
- Party: Dominion (1938-1943); Independent (1943-1948); United (1948-1954); National Conservative (1954-1957); Independent (1957-1958)
- Awards: Africa Service Medal; War Medal 1939-45; Coronation Medal

Vernon Lyall Shearer (1903 – September 1968) was a South African politician. He served as a member of the House of Assembly and as Mayor of Durban.

== Life and Career ==
Shearer was born in Durban in 1903. He studied to become a dentist.

At the age of twenty-eight, he became a member of the Durban City Council for Durban Point. He stood in the 1938 general election as a Dominion candidate for Durban Point, winning the seat and holding it until the 1958 general election. During his time as a member of the House of Assembly, he was affiliated with several political parties, serving as a member of Dominion Party (1938-1943), United Party (1948-1954) and National Conservative Party (1954-1957) and also as an independent (1943-1948 and 1957-1958).

He served as Deputy Mayor of Durban from 1963 to 1964 and subsequently as Mayor of Durban from 1964 to 1966.

Two of his grandsons, Robin Smith and Chris Smith, played cricket for England.
