= Lamontville =

- Location within KwaZulu-Natal Location within South Africa
- Coordinates: 29.941°S 30.939°E
- Country: South Africa
- Province: KwaZulu-Natal
- Municipality: eThekwini
- Main Place: Chatsworth

Area
  - Total: 3.81 km^{2} (1.47 sq mi)

Population (2011)
  - Total: 32,421
  - Density: 8,510/km^{2} (22,000/sq mi)

Racial makeup (2011)
  - Black African: 99.6%
  - Coloured: 0.2%
  - Indian/Asian: 0.1%
  - White: 0.0%
  - Other: 0.1%

First languages (2011)
  - Zulu: 83.3%
  - Xhosa: 11.1%
  - English: 2.0%
  - Sotho: 1.4%
  - Other: 2.2%
- Time zone: UTC+2 (SAST)
- Postal code (street): 4027
- PO box: 4027
- Area code: 031

Lamontville is a township in eThekwini situated in KwaZulu-Natal, South Africa.

Township south of Durban, on the Umlaas River and next to Mobeni. It was laid out in 1930 and named after the Revd Archibald Lamont, then Mayor of Durban.
