= Mayor of Durban =

Below is a list of mayors of Durban, South Africa. In 2000 Durban became the seat of the newly created eThekwini Metropolitan Municipality.

== 1854–1910 ==
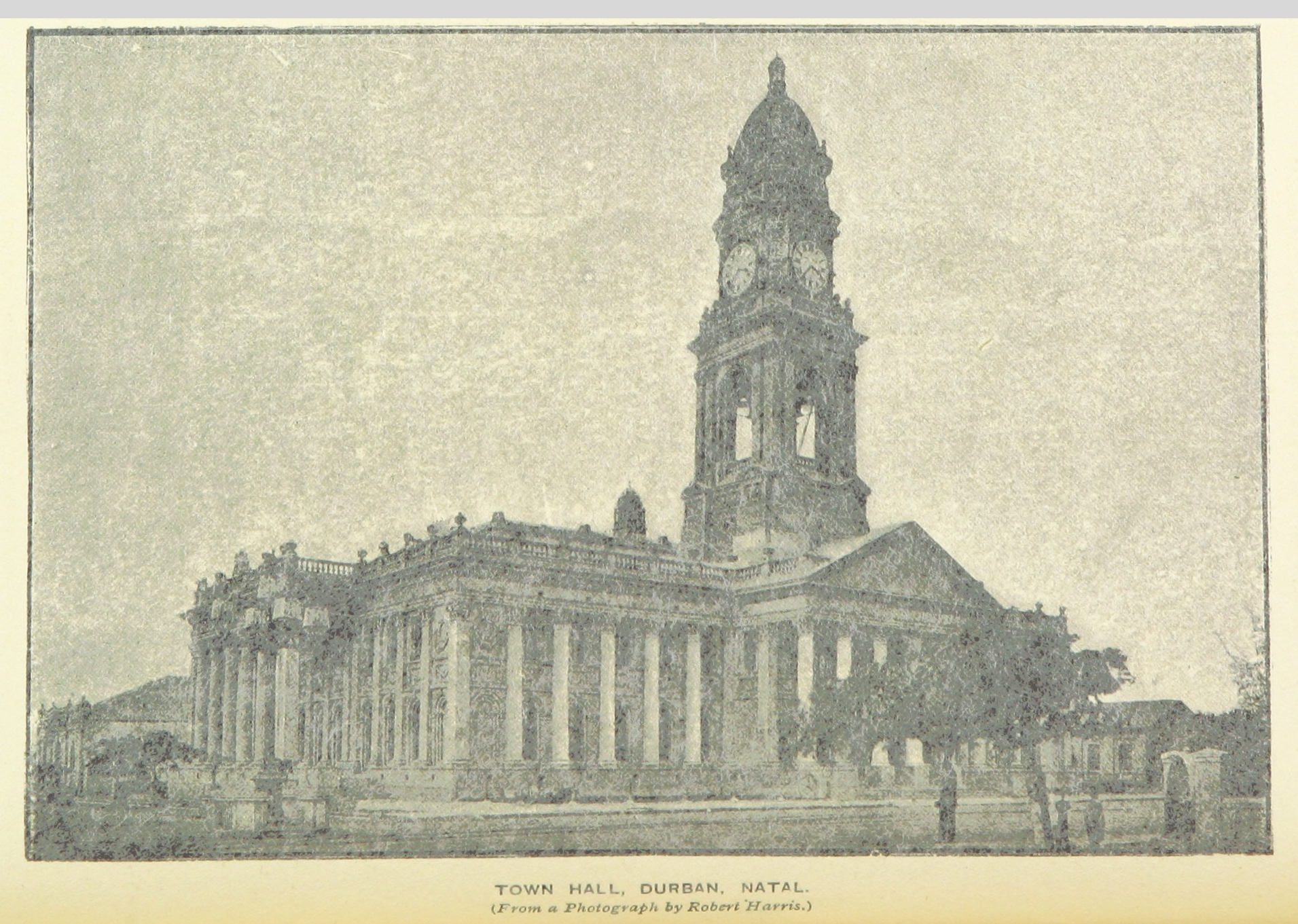
Town Hall, Durban, circa 1891

- George Christopher Cato, 1854–1856
- Edward Snell, 1856, 1867–69
- Savery Pinsent, 1856–57, 1859
- A W Evans, 1857–58
- J R Goodricke, 1857–59
- William Hartley, 1859–60
- Alexander McArthur, 1860–63
- Hugh Gillespie, 1863–65
- John Hunt and R W Tyzack, 1865–66
- Arthur Harvey and John Miller, 1866–67
- William Field, 1869–70
- J D Ballance, 1870
- William Palmer, 1871–72
- John Goodliffe, 1872–73
- Edward Pickering, 1873–74, 1882–83
- Richard Vause, 1870–71, 1874–75, 1878–79, 1883–85
- Sir Benjamin Wesley Greenacre, 1875–76, 1889–92, 1897–98
- William Arbuckle, 1876–78, 1880–82
- H W Currie, 1879–80
- J W Stranack, 1885–86
- W E Robarts, 1886–87
- T A O'Flaherty, R L Cunningham, 1887–88
- J J Hillier, 1887–89
- A W Leuchars, 1892–93
- George Payne, 1893–95, 1896–97
- R Jameson, 1895–96
- John Nicol, 1897–1901
- Ernest Leslie Acutt, 1901–02
- Joseph Ellis-Brown, 1902–05
- Charles Henwood, 1905–09
- Walter Greenacre, 1909–10

== 1910-2000 ==
- F C Hollander, 1910–13
- W Holmes, 1913–15
- J H Nicolson, 1915–18
- T Burman, 1918–20
- T Burman and Fleming Johnston, 1920–21
- Fleming Johnston, 1921–22
- W Gilbert, 1922–24
- Thomas Mansfield Wadley, 1924–26
- H L Buzzard, 1926–28
- A Eaton, 1928–29
- The Revd Archibald Lamont, 1929–32
- Oliver Lea, 1932–33
- Percy Osborn, 1933–34
- Dr S Copley, 1934–35
- Fleming Johnston, 1935–39
- Rupert Ellis-Brown, 1939–45, 1946–47
- S J Smith, 1945–46
- Leo Boyd, 1947–49
- Ken Clarke, 1949–50
- Percy Osborn, 1950–54
- R A Carte, 1954–55
- G Vernon Essery, 1955–56
- Percy Osborn, 1956–57
- H W Jackson, 1957–58
- W E Shaw, 1958–59
- C A Milne, 1959–64
- Dr Vernon Shearer, 1964–66
- Margaret Maytom
- T M Warman, 1968–70
- R Goldman, 1970–72
- Ron Williams, 1972–74
- A D Adams, 1974–76
- Dr G J Hollis, 1976–78
- Haydn Bradfield, 1978–80
- Mrs Sybil C Hotz, 1980–84
- Neil MacLennan, 1984–85
- Stanley H Lange, 1985–87
- Henry P Klotz, 1987–88
- D W Watterson, 1988–90
- J A Venter and G J Müller, 1990–92
- Margaret Winter, 1992–93
- Mike Lipschitz, 1993–96
- Obed Mlaba, 1996–2011

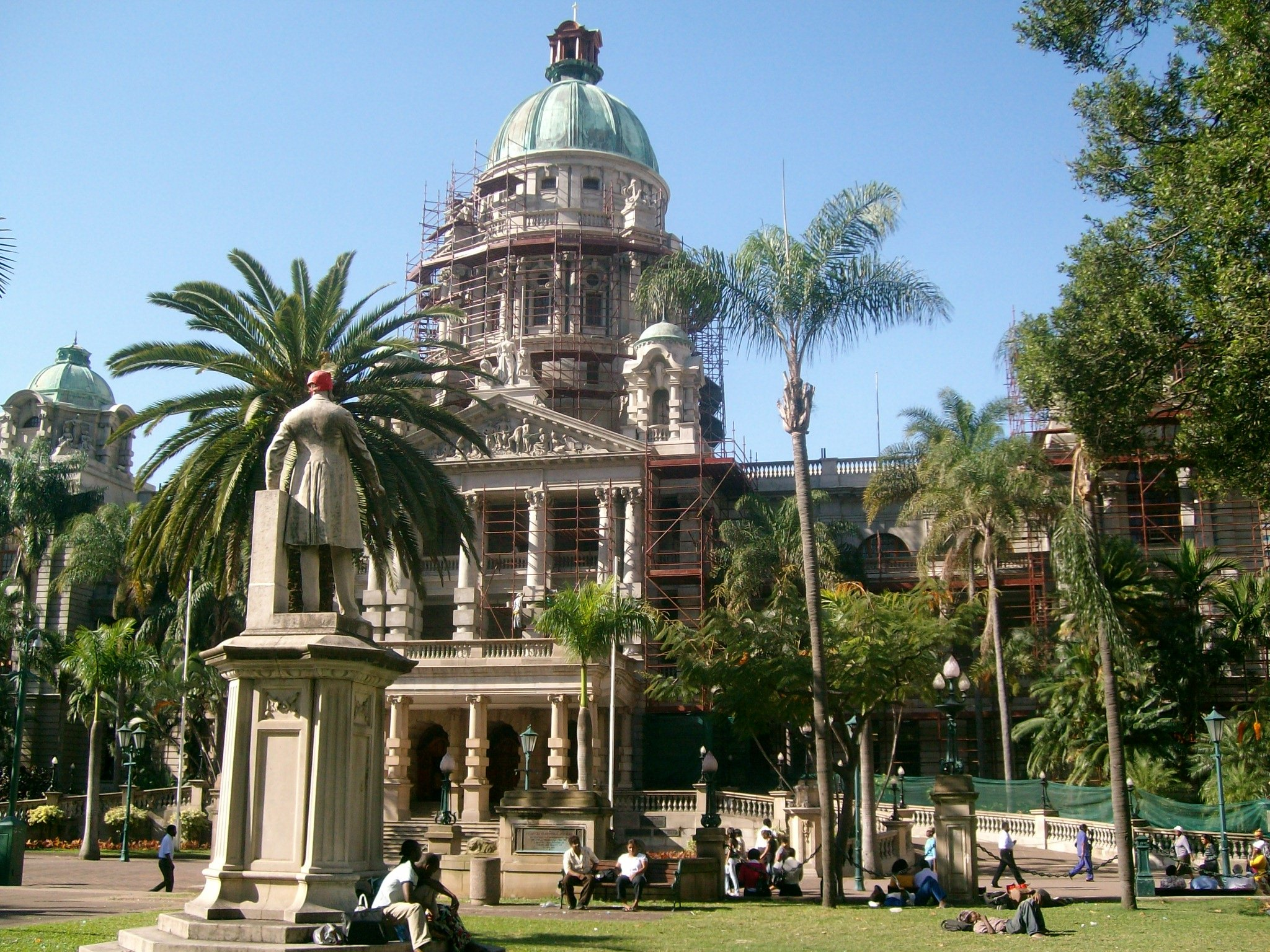
Durban City Hall, 2009

== Since 2000 (eThekwini Municipality) ==
- Obed Mlaba, 1996–2011
- James Nxumalo, 2011–2016
- Zandile Gumede, 2016–2019
- Mxolisi Kaunda, 2019–2024
- Cyril Xaba, 2024-present

== See also ==
- Timeline of Durban
- Metropolitan municipality (South Africa)
