= Umgeni Steam Railway =

World's oldest railway tunnel

Coordinates: 29.791°S 30.833°E

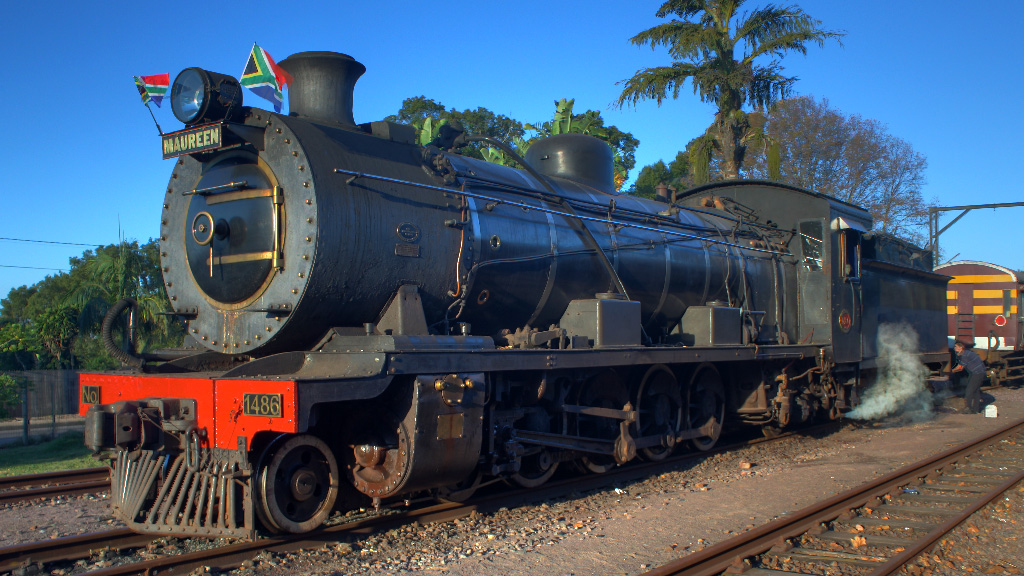
Steam locomotive 1486 (named "Maureen") at Kloof railway station after returning from an excursion run to Inchanga.

The Umgeni Steam Railway is a 3 ft 6 in (1,067 mm) gauge heritage railway at Inchanga (eThekwini Metropolitan Municipality), near Durban. The Durban to Pietermaritzburg line was built in the 1880s; it runs through a 53 metres (174 ft) long tunnel at Drummond built in 1878, which is probably the oldest tunnel in use today in South Africa

In 1982, a small Dubs locomotive was donated by the Illovo Sugar company to local enthusiasts; this was the start of the preservation group. A Class-3BR locomotive is used every month; it was built by North British Locomotive Company in February 1912. The coaches used were built between 1908 and 1953, with most being built in the 1930s.

== Excursion Trains ==
On the last weekend of every month excursion trains are run from Inchanga to Bothas Hill because of flood damage between Bothas Hill and Kloof.

== Museum ==
The Inchanga Railway Museum in the old Station Master's house next to the Inchanga Station, covers the history of South African Railways. It is open to the public on days when trains are operating.

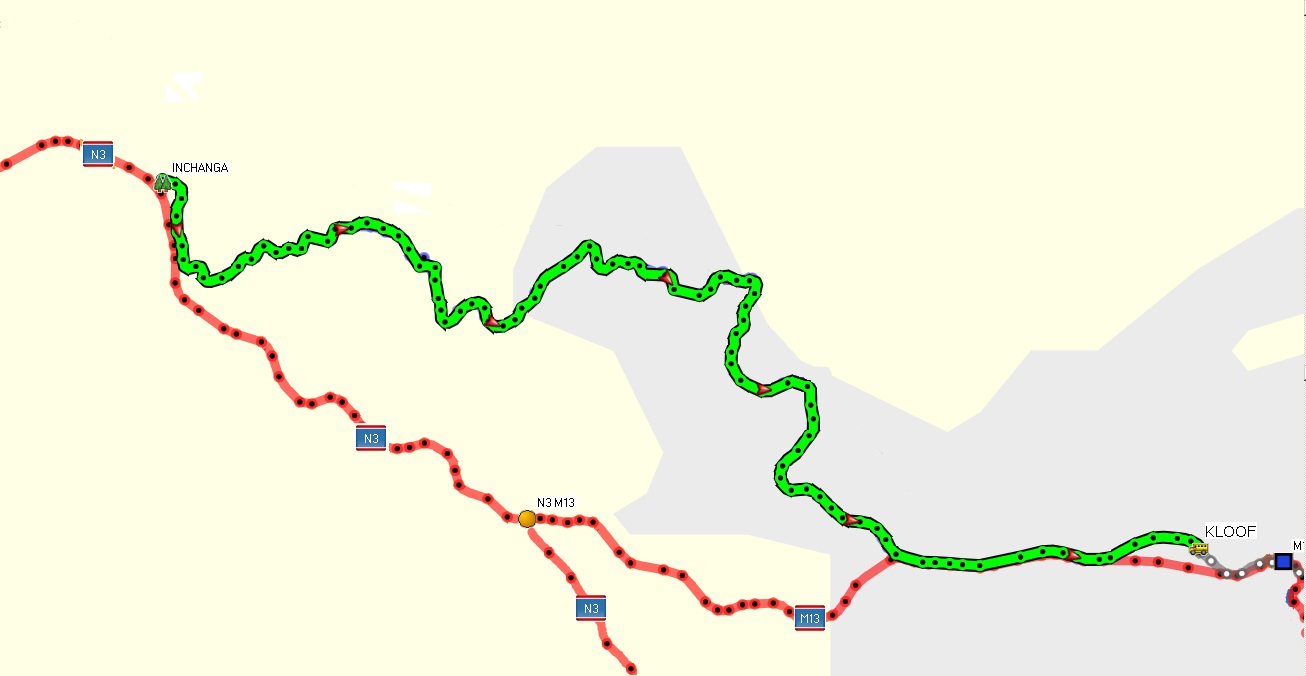
GPS tracked route from Kloof to Inchanga. The route meanders alone the Valley of 1000 Hills.

== Routes ==
The Umgeni Steam Railway currently operates trains on the last Sunday of all months of the year between Kloof and Inchanga, with special trains running from Pietermaritzburg to Inchanga and Nottingham Road. The route from Kloof to Inchanga follows the old main line from Durban to Pietermaritzburg and traverses some of the steepest railway gradients in South Africa (1:30 to 1:50).

== Fleet ==
The fleet of steam locomotives includes a Class 3BR, Class 12R, Class 14R, two Class 19Ds, a Class GF Garratt and a Class GMAM Garratt, along with the locomotive that the company was started with - namely an 1892 vintage Class A "Dübs A".

== Picture Gallery ==
(Click to enlarge)

Exhibits and scenery

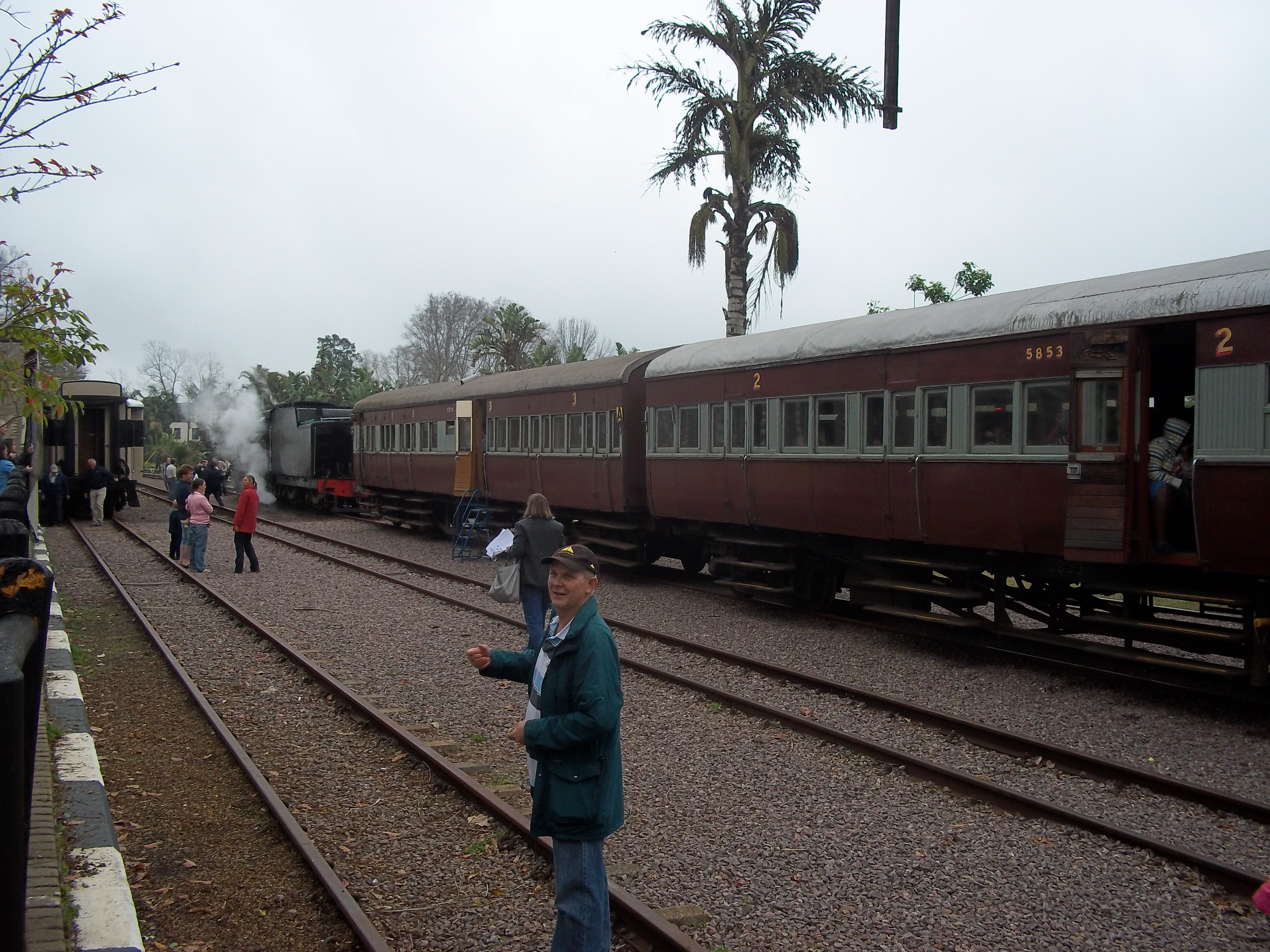
The Umgeni Steam Railway prior to departure.

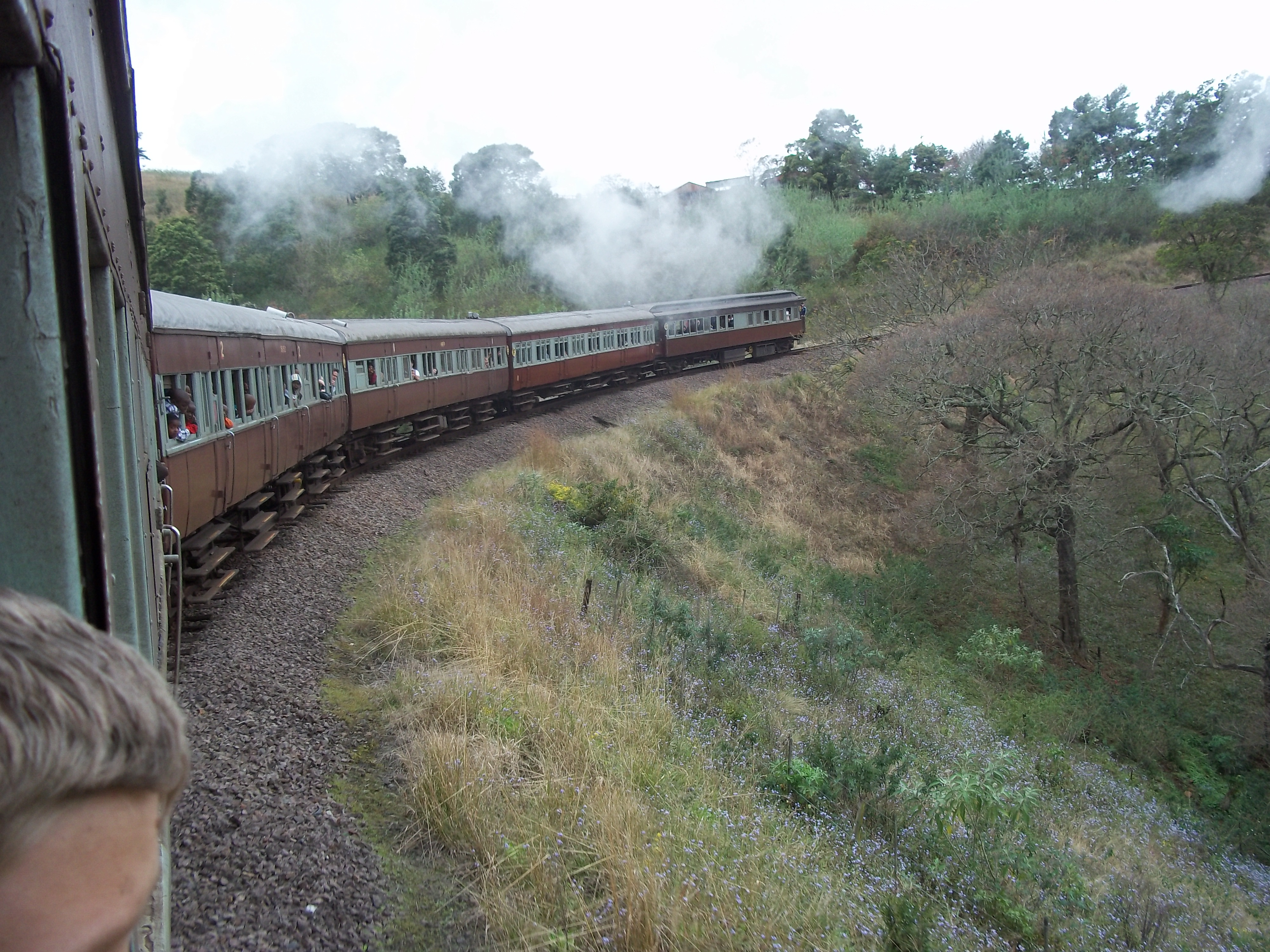
The Umgeni Steam Railway en route.

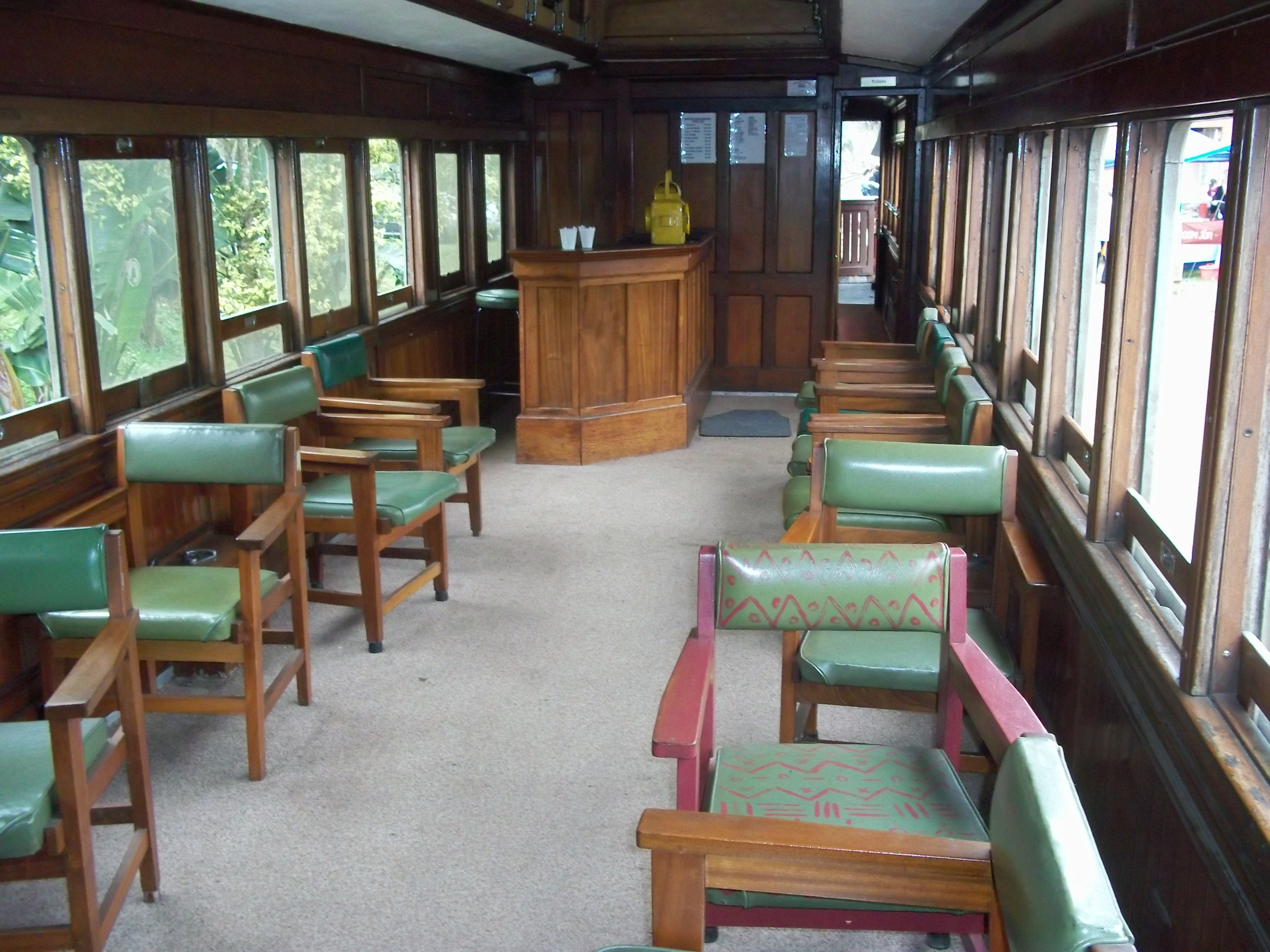
The Umgeni Steam Railway refreshment carriage.

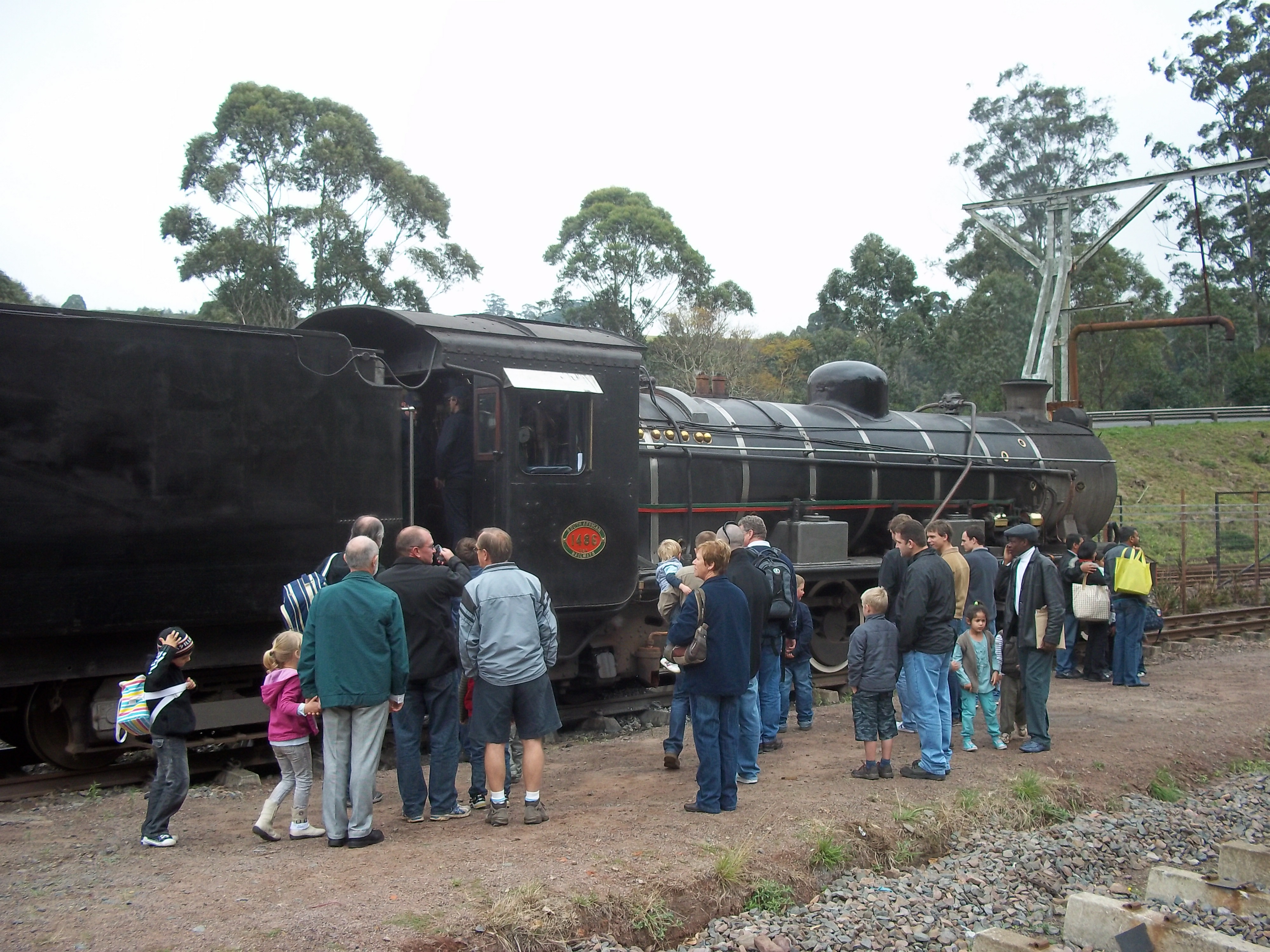
Maureen, the Class 3BR locomotive No.1486 built in 1912.

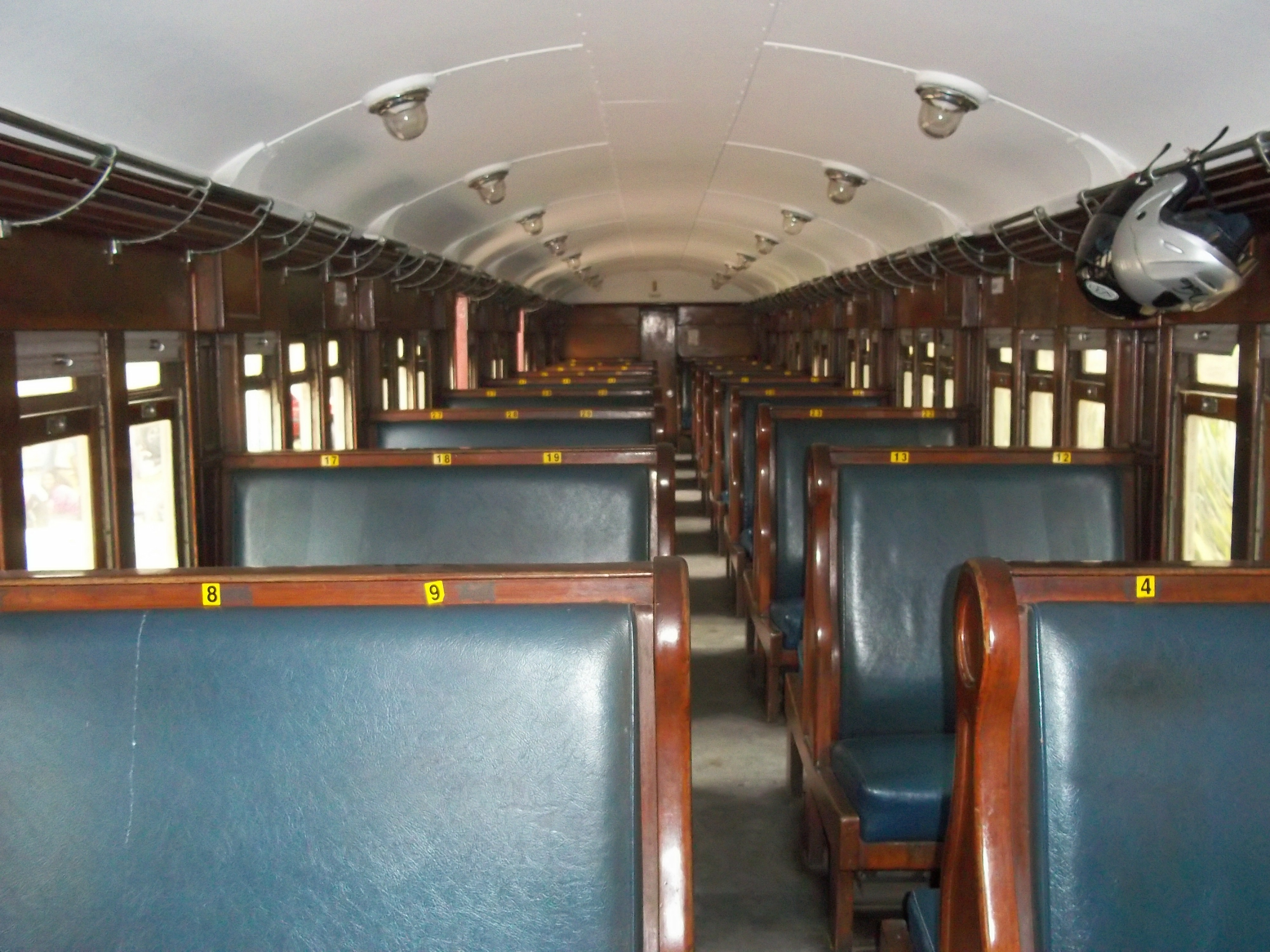
One of the passenger carriages of the Umgeni Steam Railway

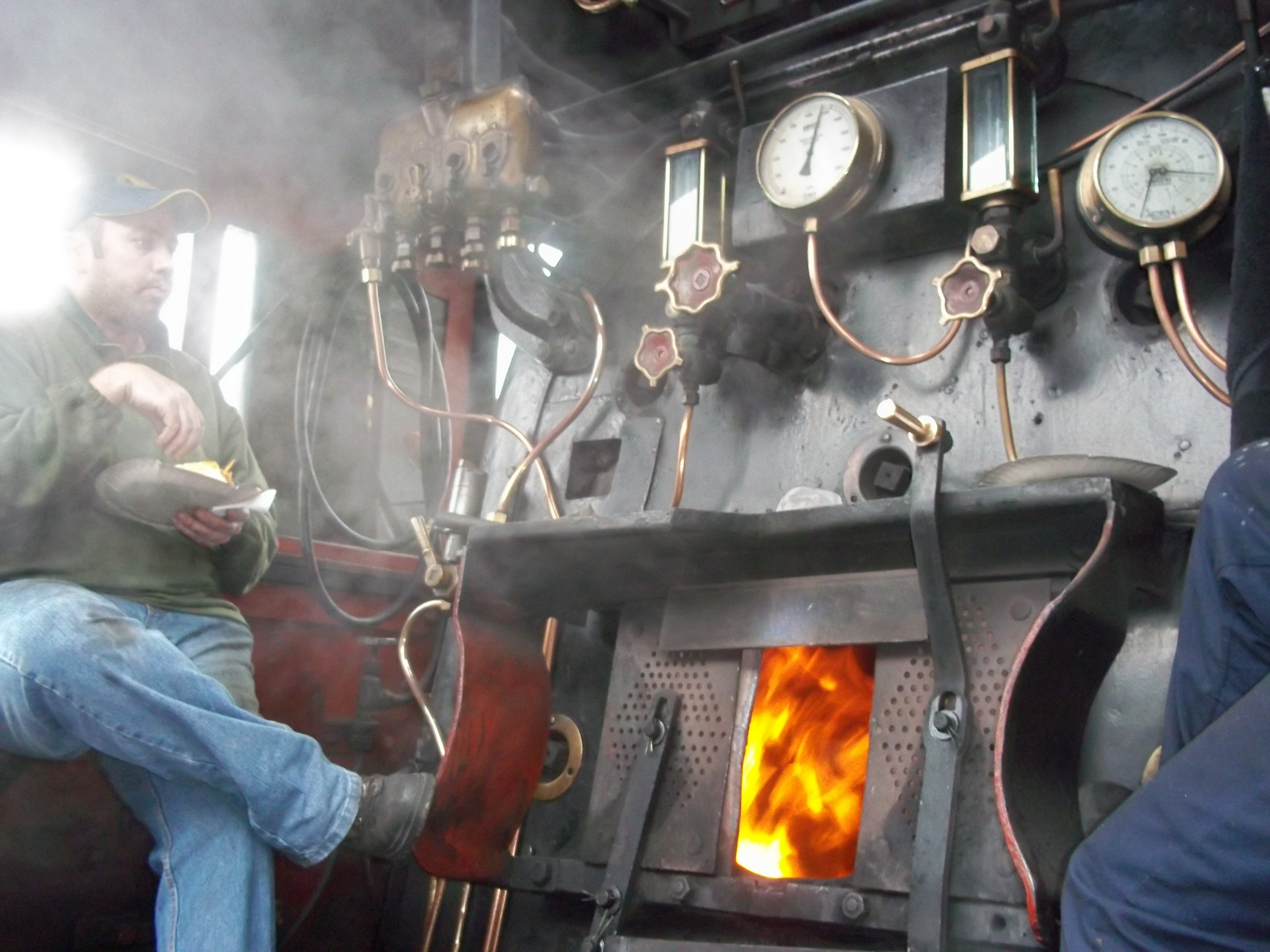
The firebox of Maureen, a 1912 built Class 3BR locomotive No.1486

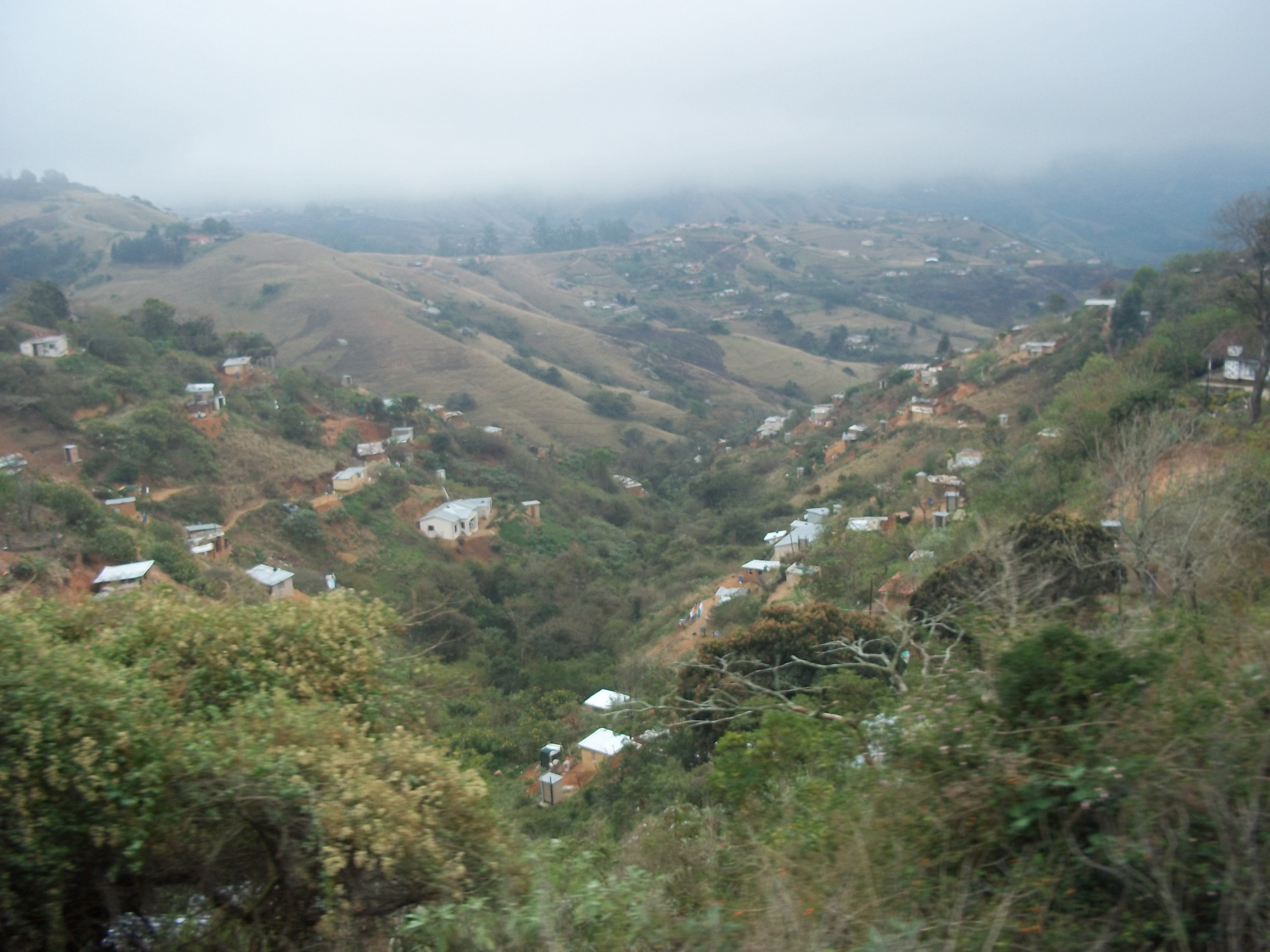
A view of KwaZulu-Natal from the Umgeni Steam Railway
