= Nomvuzo Shabalala =

South African politician (1960–2020)

Member of the National Assembly of South Africa
- In office 14 August 2018 – 26 December 2020
- Succeeded by: Nkosinathi Dlamini

Deputy Mayor of the eThekwini Metropolitan Municipality
- In office 2011–2016
- Preceded by: Logie Naidoo
- Succeeded by: Fawzia Peer

Personal details
- Born: 29 April 1960
- Died: 26 December 2020 (aged 60)
- Party: African National Congress; South African Communist Party
- Profession: Politician

Nomvuzo Francisca Shabalala (29 April 1960 – 26 December 2020) was a South African politician. She was a member of the African National Congress and the South African Communist Party. From 2011 to 2016 she was the deputy mayor of the eThekwini Metropolitan Municipality. In 2018, Shabalala was sworn in as a member of the National Assembly.

== Education ==
Shabalala was born on 29 April 1960. She only fulfilled grade eleven while she attended school. She studied programming and word processing at Mangosuthu Technikon and then waste management at the Natal Technikon. At the Durban Commercial College, she studied accounting and bookkeeping and advanced word processing. Shabalala fulfilled a leadership course at the University of Pretoria.

== Political career ==
Shabalala served as the deputy chairperson of the ANC's Durban South region between 2001 and 2002. In 2011, she was elected deputy mayor of the eThekwini Metropolitan Municipality, replacing Logie Naidoo. The next year, she was elected to the ANC's Provincial Executive Committee. Shabalala left the ANC PEC in 2015. Also in 2015, Shabalala was elected as deputy provincial chairperson of the South African Communist Party.

In February 2016, Shabalala said that the #FeesMustFall movement was a "political campaign funded by international forces that wanted to prove a point". In August 2016, Fawzia Peer was elected to succeed her as deputy mayor of eThekwini. Shabalala was elected to the Central Committee of the SACP at the party's 14th national congress in July 2017. On 14 August 2018, Shabalala was sworn in as a Member of Parliament in the National Assembly. She was then made an alternate member of the Portfolio Committee on Home Affairs and a member of the Portfolio Committee on Cooperative Governance and Traditional Affairs. Nomalungelo Gina replaced her as deputy provincial chair of the SACP at its provincial congress later on in August 2018.

At the May 2019 general election, Shabalala was elected to a full term as a parliamentarian. She was then assigned to the Joint Committee on Ethics and Members Interests and the Portfolio Committee on Basic Education.

== Death ==
Shabalala died from a COVID-19-related illness on 26 December 2020, during the COVID-19 pandemic in South Africa.

== See also ==
- List of members of the National Assembly of South Africa who died in office
