= Bheki Ntuli =

South African politician (1957–2021)

KwaZulu-Natal MEC for Transport, Community Safety & Liaison
- In office 11 September 2019 – 16 January 2021
- Premier: Sihle Zikalala
- Preceded by: Mxolisi Kaunda
- Succeeded by: Kwazi Mshengu (acting); Peggy Nkonyeni

Member of the KwaZulu-Natal Legislature
- In office 6 May 2009 – 16 January 2021

Member of the National Assembly of South Africa
- In office 1999 – 18 September 2003

Personal details
- Born: Muntukayise Bhekuyise Ntuli; 24 December 1957 Mtubatuba, Natal Province, South Africa
- Died: 16 January 2021 (aged 63)
- Party: African National Congress
- Education: Madadeni College; UCT Graduate School of Business; University of the Witwatersrand; University of Johannesburg
- Profession: Politician

Muntukayise Bhekuyise Ntuli (24 December 1957 – 16 January 2021) was a South African politician. A member of the African National Congress, he served as a Member of the National Assembly of South Africa from 1999 to 2003, when he resigned amid fraud allegations. He was then elected to the KwaZulu-Natal Legislature in 2009. On 11 September 2019, Ntuli became the Member of the Executive Council for Transport, Community Safety & Liaison, replacing Mxolisi Kaunda, who was elected Mayor of the eThekwini Metropolitan Municipality. Ntuli died on 16 January 2021, from complications of COVID-19.

== Early life and education ==
Ntuli was born on 24 December 1957 in Mtubatuba, north of Richard's Bay, in South Africa's former Natal Province. In 1980, he matriculated from Siyamukela High School in Madadeni, a township outside Newcastle. Ntuli obtained a primary teachers certificate at Madadeni College and an associate in management qualification from the UCT Graduate School of Business. From the University of the Witwatersrand, he held a certificate in leadership. Ntuli also had a post-diploma in research, strategic diplomacy and transitional justice from the University of Johannesburg.

== Political career ==
Ntuli was active in the underground structures of the African National Congress and was part of uMkhonto we Sizwe operations during apartheid. Soon after, he was involved with the establishing of ANC structures in Northern Natal. He then served as the regional chair of the ANC's Musa Dladla region for a total of 15 years and was a member of the ANC's Peace and Stability Committee for over 20 years.

In 1999, he was elected to the National Assembly, the lower house of the South African parliament, as an ANC representative. He resigned from parliament in 2003 after he pleaded guilty to abusing his travel facilities, his parliamentary medical aid and defrauding parliament. Speaker Frene Ginwala called his actions "totally unacceptable" and "reprehensible".

At the 2009 general election, Ntuli was elected to the KwaZulu-Natal Legislature. For nine years, he was a member of various committees, including the transport portfolio committee, and served as chairperson of the community safety and liaison portfolio committee in the legislature. On 11 September 2019, he was appointed Member of the Executive Council (MEC) for Transport, Community Safety and Liaison, replacing Mxolisi Kaunda, who was elected Mayor of the eThekwini Metropolitan Municipality.

== Death ==
Ntuli died from COVID-19 complications on 16 January 2021, during the COVID-19 pandemic in South Africa. At the time of his death, he was a member of the provincial executive committee of the ANC.
