= Christopher Warnes =

South African academic

Christopher Warnes is a South African academic based at the University of Cambridge. He is a University Senior Lecturer in English, a corresponding Lecturer in African Literatures and Cultures at the Cambridge Centre of African Studies, and a College Lecturer in English at St. John's College. He is the author of Magical Realism and the Postcolonial Novel: Between Faith and Irreverence, (Palgrave Macmillan, 2009), Writing, Politics and Change in South Africa after Apartheid (Cambridge University Press, 2023) and co-author, with Kim Anderson Sasser, of Magical Realism and Literature (Cambridge University Press, 2020).
