= Steve Letsike =

South African human rights activist

Steve Letsika
- Born: March 30, 1986 (age 40); Guateng, South Africa
- Citizenship: South Africa
- Known for: HIV/AIDS Activism, Women's rights and LGBT+ Activism
- Awards: UNDP-ILGA International Pride Award; 2023 UK - Human Rights Defender of the Year Award

Mmapaseka "Steve" Letsike is a South African human rights activist and politician.

Well known for her AIDS activism through her leadership roles within the South African National AIDS Council, Letsike is also one of the most prominent lesbian figures within the African National Congress, and has campaigned for LGBT rights, Women's rights and other marginalised people in South Africa. She led various other structures including the South African Pharmacy Council as the Vice President elected in February 2024.

Her activism started when she was a teenager at the age of 13. Joining Congress of the Congress of the South African Students (COSAS) Atteridgeville Branch, subsequently African National Congress Youth League in Atteridgeville and Tshwane Region, ANC Women's League and the Mother body ANC. Having served in the Region of birth, now as a resident of City of Johannesburg she is a member of ANC in the Joburg Region. Letsike is currently serving in the African National Congress National Executive Committee(2022- current).

In 2024 she was elected as a member of the National Assembly of South Africa.

== Activism ==
=== HIV/AIDS activism ===
Letsike was the deputy chair of the South African National AIDS Council, and served as the chair of its National Society Forum, implementing policies at a grassroots and local level. For several years, Letsike served as deputy to Cyril Ramaphosa, who went on to become the President of South Africa. Through his role with SANAC, Letsike called on increased psychosocial support, in addition to antiretroviral programmes, for people diagnosed with HIV/AIDS.

In 2015, Letsike represented South Africa at the launch of the DREAMS Partnership, aiming to secure an AIDS-free future for women in sub-Saharan Africa.

In 2016, she co-led the world's first LGBTI HIV strategy for South Africa. Steve Letsike has been a pioneer in the Human Rights and social justice movement for over 22 years.

In 2021, Ramaphosa named Letsike to the Chief Justice Panel, to interview shortlisted candidates and to decide who to replace Mogoeng Mogoeng at the end of his term as Chief Justice of South Africa.

=== LGBT activism ===
As a teenager, Letsike successfully challenged his high school's uniform policy, which had prohibited girls from wearing trousers. She also established its first female football team. As an adult, Letsike worked for various organisations, including Anova Health Institute, which provided sexual health services to men who had sex with men in Gauteng, Mpumalanga, North West, Limpopo, and Western Cape.

Letsike went on to establish Access Chapter 2, a non-governmental organisation that raised awareness of intersectional issues facing South Africa's marginalised communities, including black people, women, children, and the LGBT community. AC2 was named after South Africa's Bill of Rights.

Following the murders of several lesbians in 2011, including Noxolo Nogwaza, the government of South Africa established the National Task Team to investigate the increase in LGBT hate crimes in the country, with Letsike named as co-chair. In 2014, she wrote an open letter to African leaders following the passing of the Anti-Homosexuality Act by the government of Uganda.

In 2021, Letsike was named the chair of the Commonwealth Equality Network, an organisation representing civil society organisations working for LGBT rights across the Commonwealth.

In 2023, Letsike was widely tipped as being likely to be elected to the ANC's National Executive Committee; when she did not secure a nomination for any of the 87 available seats, the party's Embrace Diversity Political Movement criticised his exclusion and the failure to elect any LGBT people to the NEC. In January 2024, the NEC's General Secretary, Fikile Mbalula, named Letsike as among four new people appointed to the NEC to bring "more balanced representation" to the ANC's decision-making body. She became the second openly LGBT person to sit on the NEC, after Lynne Brown.

Over the last 2 decades, Letsike has been globally recognised and awarded multiple times for her courage, significance and commitment in the fight for liberation and freedom for minority people particularly the LGBTI community. In 2026, she won the UNDP–ILGA International Pride Award in the Emerging Leader category. With the recent 2023 UK - Human Rights Defender of the Year Award <ref>https://kaleidoscopetrust.com/kaleidoscope-trust-marks-end-of-2023-with-lifetime-achievement-award-for-former-united-nations-independent-expert/

== Personal life ==
Letsike was born on 30 March 1986 and raised in Atteridgeville, Gauteng, South Africa. Letsike's parents (from Phokeng, Rusternburg, North West) both died when she was 7 years old with her other 3 siblings all young, and they were subsequently raised by their grandparents. She has a daughter.
