= Archibald Lamont (minister) =

Presbyterian minister, social activist and mayor

Archibald Lamont (1864—1933) was a Presbyterian minister, social activist and mayor of Durban.

Lamont was born in Port Bannatyne, Bute, Scotland, he was the son of Alexander Lamont and Sarah Graham. Lamont graduated with a bachelor of divinity degree and later obtained a master of arts degree from the University of Glasgow in 1888. On the 15 December 1889 he was ordained as Presbyterian minister in Glasgow and inducted as a missionary of the Presbyterian Church of England at Singapore. He learned some Chinese language for a few months in Amoy, China, after which he conducted services in the Hokkien language in Singapore and Malaya.

Lamont became more interested in education, he gave up preaching and in 1891, he founded the Singapore Chinese Educational Institute in his own home to educate Chinese men for leadership. In 1893, Lamont bought the Eastern School in Singapore's River Valley Road. This school was founded in 1890 by the Anglo-Chinese government but was threatened with closure due to mismanagement. He merged it with his own Institute under the English Presbyterian Mission.

In 1897 Lamont returned to the United Kingdom and served in a number churches in Scotland and England. In 1912 Lamont moved to South Africa, his first ministry was in Tarkastad, Eastern Cape, in 1916 Lamont moved to Durban and was installed as minister of the Greyville Presbyterian Church. In 1918 a disagreement in the church caused a schism and Lamont and a part of the congregation left the Greyville church and met at the Inanda Masonic Hall in Stamford Hill Road in Durban, and later moved to a church in Florida Road, Durban.

He became a city councilor but, because of his stand against racial discrimination, most white Durban residents found him too liberal in his views. He was defeated in both provincial and parliamentary elections in 1927 and 1929. His election as Durban's mayor in 1929 came as a surprise. He was defeated in his bid for a fourth term as mayor, but the white workers of Durban elected him a member of the provincial council for Greyville in 1932. In recognition of his efforts to improve the conditions of the black people, a new black township was named Lamontville in his honor.

After his mayoralty he ran the Marine College, a private educational institution.

Lamont was buried in Durban in 1933.

== Published works ==
- Bright Celestials: The Chinaman at Home and Abroad. London: T. F. Unwin. 1894.
- How China Ought to be Governed: Written Before the Russo-Japan War, and Modified to Suit the Present Republican Regime. Singapore: Kelley and Walsh. 1914.
