= Clairwood Shree Siva Soobramoniar Temple =

Hindu Temple of Murugan in Durban

Clairwood Shri Shiva Soobramoniar Temple
- C.S.S.S.T
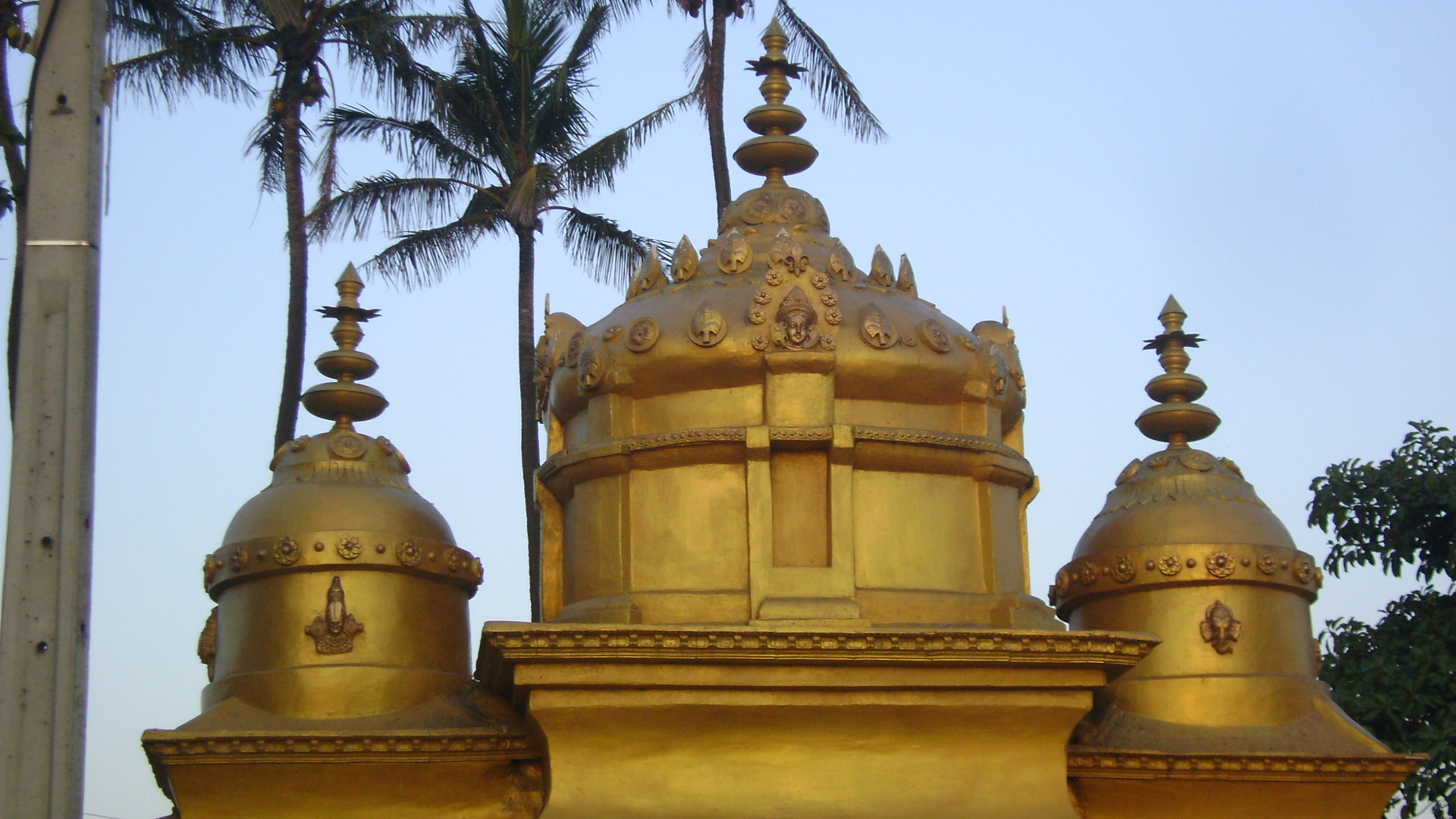
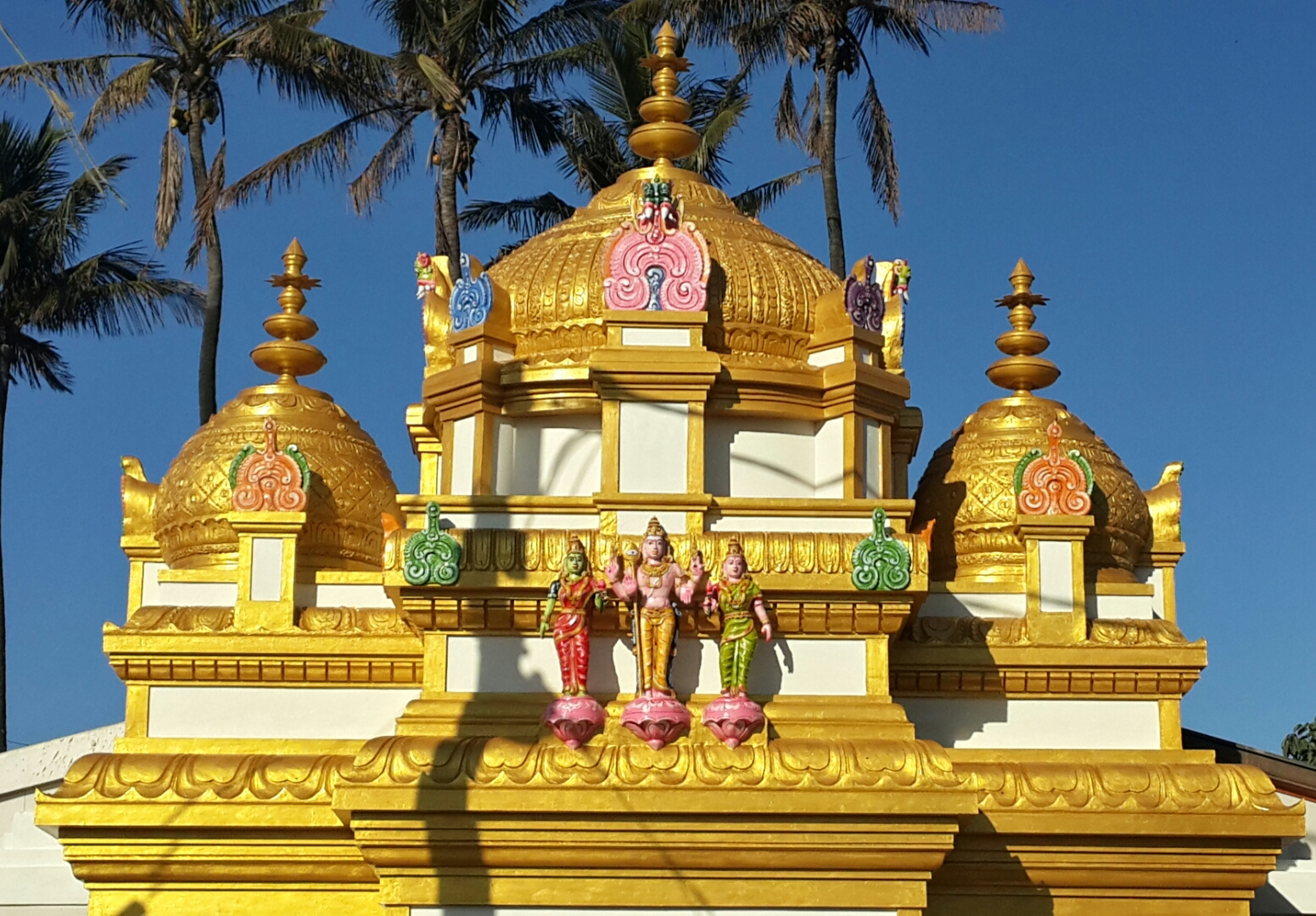
- Gopuram before refurbishment Gopuram after refurbishment Official symbol of the temple

- Location in Durban

Religion
- Affiliation: Hinduism
- District: eThekwini Metropolitan Municipality
- Deity: Siva Soobramonior(Muruga), Valli and Devasena
- Festival: Thaipusam Kavady

Location
- Location: Clairwood, Durban
- State: KwaZulu-Natal
- Country: South Africa
- Coordinates: 29°54′40″S 30°59′5″E

Architecture
- Established: 1889
- Completed: 1921

Specifications
- Temples: 2 (large) and 3 (small)
- Elevation: 13.5 m (44 ft)

Website
- www.cssst-sa.com

Clairwood Shri Shiva Subrahmanyar Temple, also known as CSSST, is a Hindu temple dedicated to the deity Muruga, located in Clairwood in Durban, South Africa. Muruga is worshipped as Shiva-Subrahmanyar. It was renovated on a number of occasions for various reasons; major refurbishment was undertaken in 2014 by sthapatis from India. It was followed by observing the Maha Kumbha Abhishekam, which marked the 125th year since the temple was established in 1889.The temple has been popular among the South African Indians for the Annual Thaipusam Kavady Festival.

== Legend ==
Legend and folklore has it that the earliest origins of the temple can be attributed to the sudden appearance in the area of a Sadhu or holy man, in or about 1889, shortly after the earliest free indentured labourers settled here.

This man was first observed sitting in deep meditation under a tree on the bank of the Amanzimyama river. His appearance, demeanor and mysticism caused a great stir of interest among the community. When the residents went to meet and have an audience with the holy man, however, they sadly found that he had left the place and disappeared.

What they did find through, was that he had left behind a boulder in the shape of a lingam with three white stripes and a red dot, and a vel fashioned out of wire. The perplexed residents not yet having a temple in the area, perceived this to be a divine message to build a temple on the site of the lingum and vel. Thus was the built the first temple around the lingum and vel.

== History ==
One devoted and spiritual-minded person in the name of Arumuga Soobramoney Paradassi established a Vel indicating the weapon of Muruga in order to start regular services of worship. This was done on a, piece of open ground in a wood place, also known as Bob place, and thus a place of worship had begun. Services were continued under some sort of shelter, though premature it may be there were devout followers of Hinduism. Services and religious festivities were carried on and people co-operated with him. Eventually in 1915 a committee was instituted and office bearers were elected. In order to give impetus and develop the temple ideologies and they continued vigorously to carry out the functions of the temple and accumulated funds which enabled them to acquire a piece of ground in 1919 in Sirdar Road, Clairwood under the name of the Madras Temple. The first trustees were elected and thus a further stage had been reached in the early days of this temple. The functions of the temple continued and the cooperation of the people were so automatic that the activities were of high order and Chariots, Kavadies, Amman Gargams and other incidental practices were embarked upon. In this way the people became enlightened to throw in their forces in support of the temple work. During this period there was no constructional progress although funds were being accumulated and this gave rise to differences of views as to the future developments and others were very enthusiastic and co-operated with a view to make substantial improvement and to plan the erection of a permanent temple on the piece acquired in Sirdar Road. However this did not materialise during the term of office of the present officials. At that stage the Indian population of the area increased tremendously and the congregation grew larger and larger.

In the year 1919, the first move of the committee was to transfer the existing temple to its new place in Sirdar Road and to rename the temple as the Shree Siva Soobramoniar Temple. A quick move was made to raise sufficient funds in cash and kind to start building operations in Sirdar road. Donations in cash and kind were pouring in through special efforts of the people and the main temple was completed, other community members gave of their services free of charge. The officials continued with the building programmes and completed the other subsidiary temple, including the Drobathy Ammen temple. Soon after this various prominent people in the district of Clairwood donated idols which are still in the temple up to this day.

Immediately after the completion of the temple work the committee made a bold move to erect a very large hall to hold social functions and for the benefit of the devotees . The residents willingly contributed towards the erection of this hall. The committees were admired for its efforts in conducting festivals and services associated with the temple.

Ever since the Temple was transferred to Sirdar Road under the designation of Shree Siva Soobramoniar Temple, various additions and improvements have taken place to enhance the surroundings and uplift the spirituality of devotees.

== Description ==
Clairwood Shri Shiva Subrahmanyar Temple is also referred to by the initialism CSSST or C.S.S.S.T. It is a Hindu temple dedicated to the deity Muruga, located in Clairwood, Durban.

== Festivals ==
- Good Friday Amman Prayer
- Chitraparuvam Kavady
- Aadi Amman Prayer
- Varalakshmi Vratam
- Krishna Janmashtami
- Ganesh Chaturthi
- Purattaasi Prayer
- Navratri
- Skanda Shashti
- Karthikai Deepam
- Hanuman Jayanti
- Thaipusam Kavady
- Maha Shivaratri
- Monthly Shashti

== See also ==
- Kaumaram
- Six Abodes of Lord Muruga
- Skanda Purana
- Kanda Shasti Kavasam
