= Mxolisi Kaunda =

Mayor of eThekwini

Mxolisi Kaunda MP

Permanent Delegate to the National Council of Provinces from KwaZulu-Natal
- Incumbent
- Assumed office 15 June 2024

Mayor of Durban
- In office 5 September 2019 – 14 June 2024
- Deputy: Belinda Scott; Philani Mavundla
- Preceded by: Zandile Gumede

KwaZulu-Natal MEC for Transport, Community Safety and Liaison
- In office 7 June 2016 – 4 September 2019
- Premier: Sihle Zikalala; Willies Mchunu
- Preceded by: Willies Mchunu
- Succeeded by: Bheki Ntuli

Member of the KwaZulu-Natal Legislature
- In office 6 May 2009 – 4 September 2019

Personal details
- Born: Thomas Mxolisi Kaunda; 13 September 1972 (age 54) Inanda, Natal Province, South Africa
- Party: African National Congress
- Spouse: Nomzamo
- Education: University of South Africa; University of the Witwatersrand

Thomas Mxolisi Kaunda (born 13 September 1972) is a South African politician from KwaZulu-Natal serving as a Permanent Delegate to the National Council of Provinces since 2024. Prior to serving in parliament, he was the Mayor of the eThekwini Metropolitan Municipality from 2019 until 2024. He was the KwaZulu-Natal MEC for Transport, Community Safety and Liaison from 2016 to 2019 and a member of the KwaZulu-Natal Legislature from 2009 to 2019. Kaunda is a member of the ruling African National Congress (ANC).

== Early life and education ==
Kaunda was born on 13 September 1972, in the town of Inanda outside Durban in the Natal Province. He became involved in politics at the age of fifteen, as he joined the Congress of South African Students (COSAS). He matriculated from Intshisekelo High School and then went on to study at the University of South Africa, where he achieved a Diploma in Governance and Leadership. He later studied at the University of the Witwatersrand and obtained an Advanced Diploma in Advanced Governance and Public Leadership.

== Political career ==
In 2000, Kaunda was elected as a ward councillor of the newly established eThekwini Metropolitan Municipality, a position he held until the 2006 municipal election when he became a PR councillor of the municipality. He served on the municipal Economic Development and Markets Sub-Committee.

He was deployed to the KwaZulu-Natal Legislature following the 2009 general election. In his first term as an MPL, he served as Chairperson of the Transport Portfolio Committee. He was a member of the Finance, Community Safety and Liaison committees. Kaunda was also an alternate member of the Co-Operative Governance and Traditional Affairs committees.

Following his re-election in 2014, he remained Chairperson of the Transport Committee and became a member of the legislature's Economic Development, Tourism and Environmental Affairs, and Community Safety and Liaison committees.

In June 2016, newly elected Premier Willies Mchunu appointed Kaunda as the MEC for Transport, Community Safety and Liaison. Sihle Zikalala was elected Premier in May 2019, and he retained Kaunda in his post.

In addition to holding public office, Kaunda has also held multiple ANC party leadership positions. He was elected to the post of ANCYL Provincial Secretary in 2004 and served until 2008 when he was appointed ANCYL Provincial Chairperson, a post he held until 2010. He has been a member of the ANC's Provincial Executive Committee (PEC) since 2012. Kaunda is also a Provincial Working Committee (PWC) member.

== Mayor of eThekwini (2019–present) ==
In August 2019, after months of legal challenges and infighting controversies, the ANC KwaZulu-Natal branch officially recalled Zandile Gumede as Mayor of eThekwini on 13 August 2019. Kaunda was seen as one of three frontrunners for the post alongside Nomusa Dube-Ncube and Nhlanhla Ngidi. Kaunda was ultimately selected for the post on 22 August 2019. Gumede tendered her resignation as mayor on 26 August 2019, but withdrew it on 29 August 2019. This move from Gumede resulted in the monthly council sitting, which was supposed to elect new leadership, being delayed. Gumede officially resigned on 3 September 2019. Kaunda was elected Mayor of eThekwini on 5 September 2019.

On 12 June 2024, the ANC in KwaZulu-Natal recalled Kaunda as mayor of eThekwini and announced that he would be taking up a seat in the National Council of Provinces, the upper house of parliament. He resigned as mayor on 14 June and was sworn in as a permanent delegate to the NCOP the following day.
