= Amanda Mapena =

South African politician

Amanda Mapena MPL

KwaZulu-Natal MEC for Sports, Arts and Culture
- In office 11 August 2022 – 12 April 2023
- Premier: Nomusa Dube-Ncube
- Preceded by: Hlengiwe Mavimbela
- Succeeded by: Ntuthuko Mahlaba

Member of the KwaZulu-Natal Legislature
- Incumbent
- Assumed office 22 May 2019

Personal details
- Born: Amanda Glenrose Bani
- Party: African National Congress
- Spouse: William Mapena
- Profession: Politician

Amanda Glenrose Mapena (née Bani) is a South African politician who was the Member of the Executive Council (MEC) for Sports, Arts and Culture in KwaZulu-Natal from August 2022 until her resignation in April 2023. She has been a member of the KwaZulu-Natal Legislature since May 2019. Mapena is a member of the African National Congress.

== Political career ==
Mapena was elected to the KwaZulu-Natal Legislature on the ticket of the African National Congress in the 2019 national and provincial elections. Having entered the provincial legislature, Mapena was appointed chairperson of the sports, arts and culture portfolio committee. In June 2021, Mapena was implicated in an estimated R140 000 fraudulent payment that resulted in the former head of eThekwini parks and recreation department, Thembinkosi Ngcobo, being fired. Mapena is also a member of the ANC provincial elective committee.

Following the resignation of Sihle Zikalala as the premier of KwaZulu-Natal on 5 August 2022, Mapena was one of three candidates nominated by the ANC PEC to succeed Zikalala. The MEC for Finance, Nomusa Dube-Ncube, was selected by the national executive committee of the ANC to replace Zikalala. On 11 August 2022, Mapena was appointed by premier Dube-Ncube as the MEC for Sports, Arts and Culture. She resigned from office on 12 April 2023.

== Personal life ==
Mapeni is married to William Mapena, the former speaker of the eThekwini Metropolitan Municipality and the former deputy regional chairperson of the ANC in eThekwini.
