= Zandile Gumede =

South African politician (born 1961)

Deputy Convenor of KwaZulu-Natal
- In office 23 August 2016 – 3 September 2019
- Preceded by: James Nxumalo
- Succeeded by: Mxolisi Kaunda

Member of the KwaZulu-Natal Provincial Legislature
- Incumbent
- Assumed office 19 August 2020

Personal details
- Born: 12 May 1961 (age 65) Durban, South Africa
- Party: uMkhonto weSizwe Party

Zandile Ruth Thelma Gumede (born 12 May 1961) is a South African politician who has been serving as a Member of the KwaZulu-Natal Provincial Legislature since 2020. She served as the Executive Mayor of the eThekwini Metropolitan Municipality from 2016 until 2019. Gumede is a member of the African National Congress. And the current Chair Person of the African National Congress (ANC) at EThekwini Region.

== Early life ==
A mother of four and a grandmother of seven, Gumede, who resides in Phoenix, was born on 12 May 1961 in Amaoti at Inanda, north of Durban. She is one of thirteen children born to Mr and Mrs Majola. Gumede attended Amaoti Primary, Okhozini Primary in Hammarsdale and JL Dube and Zwelibanzi Secondary Schools. Her father was a police officer.

== Politics ==
Her career included being a former ward councillor, executive committee member and chairperson of the Community and Emergency Services Committee. Gumede was elected as a proportional representative (PR) councillor for two terms before she became Amaoti councillor. In the eThekwini Municipality, she was also elected as treasurer from 2007 to 2015.

After 1994, Gumede worked in different community development organisations in Inanda, including the Inanda Civic Association, Inanda Development Forum, CPF and also a health organisation.

Her purchases of armoured vehicles has raised concern by some critics.

After nominating Mxolisi Kaunda in August 2019 as Durban's new mayor, the ruling ANC begged Gumede to resign her mayoralty. On 26 August 2019 it was reported that the ANC had received Gumede's resignation, but two days later Gumede withdrew her resignation. Her lawyers advised her to withdraw her resignation in the light of the criminal charges she is facing.

On 19 August 2020, Gumede was sworn in as a Member of the KwaZulu-Natal Provincial Legislature, replacing Ricardo Mthembu, who died from COVID-19 in July. Opposition parties criticised her appointment, while Duduzane Zuma, son of former president Jacob Zuma, congratulated her.

== Alleged involvement in crime ==
In December 2018, the Hawks, a South African criminal investigation unit, included Gumede in forensic investigations related to fraud, money laundering and corruption during her tenure, and personal involvement in alleged illegal tender awards, fake employment creation and various other matters.

On 14 May 2019, Gumede appeared in the Special Commercial Crimes court in Durban for multiple crimes relating to fraud, and was released on R50,000 bail, pending further court appearances. The ANC Youth League called for Gumede to resign as mayor because the bail conditions imposed by the court would not allow her execute her mayoral functions, while the ANC Women's League showed support for her to remain in office. After the arrest of Gumede, the Hawks investigation officer in charge of this case, was ambushed by three gunmen and injured in an alleged assassination attempt. Her term as mayor came to an end when Mxolisi Kaunda was elected as Durban's mayor on 5 September 2019.

On 10 October 2019, the Hawks and members of the South African National Prosecuting Authority's (NPA) Asset Forfeiture Unit raided Gumede's Illchester Avenue home in Durban North. However, Gumede was not found there and it was discovered that she had only rented the property and vacated it in July, subsequently changing addresses - a direct violation of her bail conditions. The Hawks and the NPA then moved to Gumede's home in Inanda where they served her a court order to carry out the raids in relation to a R280 million tender scam within the Durban Solid Waste department. The raids were intended to seize R51 million in assets, including a number of luxury vehicles, including Porsches, Lamborghinis and Jaguar. Various homes, belonging to fifteen other co-accused individuals were also targeted during the raids. Footage of the raids went viral online.

On 30 November 2021, Gumede, along with 21 other individuals, is scheduled to appear at the Durban High Court for a pre-trial conference. The trial will cover charges of corruption, fraud and racketeering in relation to business tenders in the eThekwini Municipality. As of 29 March 2022, the case against Gumede and her co-accused continued, as they face more than 2000 charges.On the 18 August 2025 Zandile Gumede and others are back in court for corruption.

== See also ==
- Mayor of eThekwini
- Timeline of Durban
