= Obed Mlaba =

South African politician (born 1943)

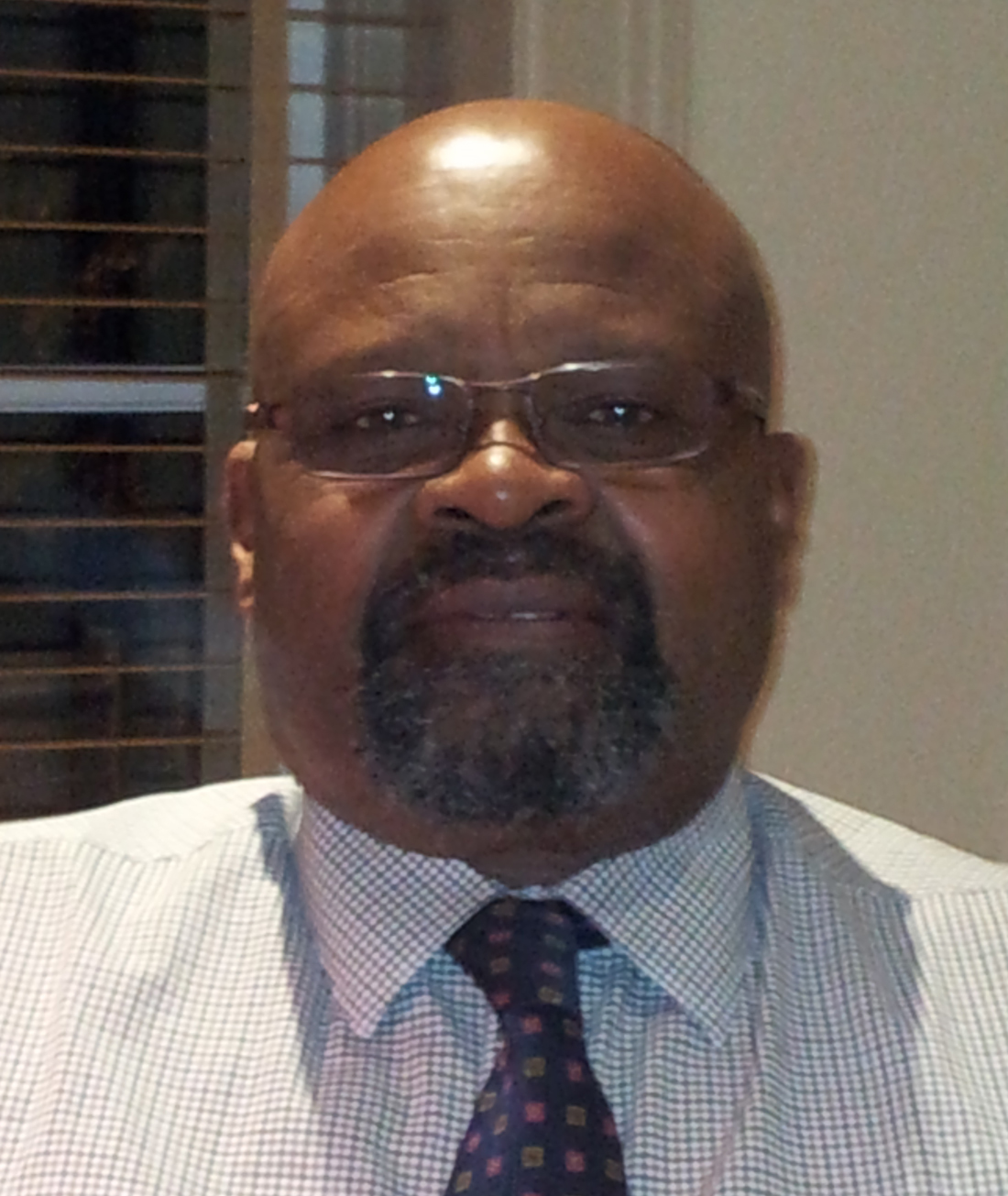

South African High Commissioner to the United Kingdom
- In office February 2014 – 22 September 2017
- President: Jacob Zuma
- Preceded by: Zola Skweyiya
- Succeeded by: Nomatemba Tambo

Mayor of Durban
- In office 1996–2012
- Preceded by: Mike Lipschitz
- Succeeded by: James Nxumalo

Personal details
- Born: Obed Thembinkosi Mlaba; 9 September 1943 (age 83) Estcourt, KwaZulu-Natal
- Party: African National Congress
- Spouse: Nomfundo Audrey
- Education: International Management Centre

Obed Thembinkosi Mlaba (born 9 September 1943) is the former High Commissioner of South Africa to the United Kingdom and served as mayor of Durban, one of the largest and most commercially active cities in South Africa.

== Early life and career ==
Mlaba was born near Estcourt, KwaZulu-Natal to Japhet and Garlina Mlaba and was one of three children and the only boy. He went to Inchanga Primary School and then St Augustine where he obtained his matric. He holds BA in Administration and an MBA.

He grew up in the apartheid era and the events of that period heavily influenced his views and expectations. He developed keen political awareness and became a member of the African National Congress, ANC when it was unbanned in 1990.

Mlaba started as social worker in a government department before moving into the private sector where he has held positions that include personnel officer, industrial relations specialist as well as senior managerial positions in business development. In the process he has worked for some of the biggest companies in South Africa such as Grinrod and Co, South African Breweries and Eskom, the energy giant.

Over the years he has also been involved in the retail and groceries sector and became an entrepreneur, building his own supermarket chain.

Throughout his career, he has sat on a number of boards; Thekwini Business Development Centre, South African Breweries, Osri Telecommunications and others. In 1994/95 he was chair of the Durban Metropolitan Council During this time he was active member of the team tasked with the development and drafting of local government legislation.

In 1995 he became the chairman of the KwaZulu Natal Local Government Association and deputy chairman of the national equivalent, the South African Local Government Association, SALGA.

== Mayor of Durban (1996-2012) ==
Mlaba was elected the first mayor of Durban or as it is known in South Africa, Ethekwini Metropolitan Municipality in 1996 after the transition to multiparty democracy. Durban is the third largest city in South Africa with the busiest port in the whole of Africa.

During his three terms of office, some major developments involving flagship infrastructure projects were commissioned or completed. These include the “ambitious social realignment programme” in the KwaMashu Town Centre Upgrade, the South Durban Basin Hub, the expansion of the Harbour whose capacity was now being stretched to the limit, the development of the River Horse Valley Business Estate, a development that was designed to provide this strategic infrastructure linking major residential and business townships, restructuring the colonial and apartheid urban landscape. He was also the mayor who oversaw the infrastructural development geared towards the staging of 2010 FIFA world cup competition. These are just but a few major ones from the numerous projects and developments that were commissioned during his terms in office.

He had a bias towards business and economic development and encouraged and lured investors to Durban and supported the development of local business and entrepreneurs. However, providing housing for the general population, proved to be a more difficult task for both the national and local governments. Social injustices of the many years of colonialism and apartheid will take quite a while and enormous resources to reverse. In Durban shanty towns continue to sprout and blight many landscapes and this has led to protest demonstrations and sometimes confrontation between the dwellers and local authorities.

As a public figure, he also attracted a lot of attention, allegations of corruption, rumours and criticism. The MEC of KZN instituted an investigation into the running of the council culminating in the Manase Report. No charges resulted against Mlaba from this investigation and he strongly defends his time in office as mayor.

== The Sixth South African High Commissioner to the United Kingdom ==
In February 2014, Mlaba was appointed High Commissioner to the United Kingdom. One of his goals during his term of office as a diplomat is to improve and strengthen the relationship that exists between the two countries, politically and economically. With a strong bias towards business and industry, Mr Mlaba is determined to attract investment towards South Africa. He strongly believes that the two countries have much to offer each other and that the history that binds them should be exploited to their mutual benefit.

== Personal life ==
Mlaba is married to Nomfundo Audrey, a former nurse and they have seven children and 11 grandchildren. He loves sport, particularly football.

== See also ==
- Mayor of eThekwini
- Timeline of Durban
