= James Nxumalo =

South African politician

James Nxumalo MPL

Member of the KwaZulu-Natal Provincial Legislature
- Incumbent
- Assumed office 22 May 2019

Mayor of eThekwini
- In office May 2011 – August 2016
- Preceded by: Obed Mlaba
- Succeeded by: Zandile Gumede

Personal details
- Born: 12 February 1965 (age 61) New Hanover, Natal; South Africa
- Party: African National Congress
- Other political affiliations: South African Communist Party

James Sikhosiphi Nxumalo (born 12 February 1965) is a South African politician who has represented the African National Congress (ANC) in the KwaZulu-Natal Provincial Legislature since 2019. He was formerly the Mayor of eThekwini from 2011 to 2016, and during that time he was engaged in a strident political rivalry with Zandile Gumede, who became his successor. He was elected to a five-year term on the Central Committee of the South African Communist Party (SACP) in 2022, and he has served as the Provincial Chairperson of the SACP's KwaZulu-Natal branch for over a decade.

== Early life and career ==
Nxumalo was born on 12 February 1965 in Natal province, later incorporated into KwaZulu-Natal. He was born on a farm in New Hanover, where his parents were farm labourers, and he had 14 siblings. While attending Siphesihle High School in Inchanga in the 1980s, he joined the United Democratic Front; he later also joined the ANC, the ANC Youth League, and the SACP. He first left his hometown to take up his first job packing chicken at Rainbow Chicken in Cato Ridge outside Pietermaritzburg.

Between 1996 and 2000, Nxumalo represented the ANC as a local councillor in the now-defunct Outer West Local Council. When the council was amalgamated with others in 2000, he was elected to a council seat in the new eThekwini Metropolitan Municipality, and he became eThekwini Speaker in 2005.

== Mayor of eThekwini: 2011–2016 ==
By early 2011, Nxumalo was Provincial Chairperson of the KwaZulu-Natal branch of the SACP, an office he held in parallel to his position as eThekwini Speaker, and, ahead of the 2011 local elections, he was considered the frontrunner to succeed longstanding incumbent Obed Mlaba as Mayor of eThekwini. He was indeed elected in 2011.

=== ANC regional leadership contest ===
By 2014, while still Mayor, he was engaged in a hostile contest over the leadership of the ANC's powerful eThekwini regional branch, the party's largest branch in the country. His main rival for the position of Regional Chairperson was Zandile Gumede, the incumbent Regional Treasurer, but his candidacy reportedly had the support of Bheki Cele, then a national deputy minister, and Senzo Mchunu, then the ANC Provincial Chairperson in KwaZulu-Natal. The leadership elections were postponed twice – amid violence, intimidation, and allegations of vote-buying – before they were finally held in Durban on 14–15 February 2015. Nxumalo was elected Regional Chairperson, receiving 253 votes against Gumede's 212, and Thabani Nyawose was elected as his deputy.

However, in the aftermath of the February elective conference, aggrieved ANC members disputed the election outcome. In March, the election was nullified on the basis that three disqualified local branches had wrongly been allowed to vote in the elections; there were also allegations, denied by Nxumalo, that he or his supporters had bought votes from delegates at the conference. In response Nxumalo wrote an open letter alleging that Gumede's supporters had themselves engaged in unfair practices ahead of the election, including by attempting to bribe voters.

The leadership election was not re-run for several months, as further violent clashes between Gumede and Nxumalo's supporters led to further postponements. In the interim, in November 2015, the provincial ANC held its own controversial elective conference, at which Sihle Zikalala was elected ANC Provincial Chairperson in KwaZulu-Natal. Gumede was a strong supporter of Zikalala, while Nxumalo supported Senzo Mchunu's failed re-election bid. These alliances additionally took on a national factional dimension, as Nxumalo and Mchunu were viewed as aligned to ANC Deputy President Cyril Ramaphosa while the Gumede–Zikalala axis was opposed to Ramaphosa's bid to become ANC President.

The eThekwini ANC's leadership elections were finally re-run at Moses Mabhida Stadium on 12–13 December 2015, but Nxumalo and his supporters boycotted the elective conference, alleging that there had been irregularities in the electoral process. Gumede was elected Regional Chairperson, receiving 283 votes against the single vote for Nxumalo. Nxumalo claimed that his name had been included on the ballot paper, his boycott notwithstanding, as part of an intentional attempt to humiliate him.

=== Succession ===
By May 2016, as the 2016 local elections approached, sources told the Mail & Guardian that Nxumalo was likely to be dropped as the ANC's mayoral candidate by the eThekwini ANC, under the influence of newly elected Regional Chairperson Gumede. In early June, Nxumalo gave an emotional and reflective budget speech that was misinterpreted by some as a resignation announcement, prompting the council to clarify that he would complete his five-year mayoral term. Nxumalo vacated the mayoral office after the election, which was held in early August, and he was succeeded as Mayor by Gumede.

After he left the mayoral office, Gumede remained in office as SACP Provincial Chairperson; he was re-elected to that office in August 2018, with Nomalungelo Gina elected as his deputy. Also in 2018, he was touted as a possible candidate to run against Zikalala for the ANC provincial chair, after the other Ramaphosa-aligned candidate, Mike Mabuyakhulu, was charged with corruption.

== Provincial legislature: 2019–present ==
In the 2019 general election, Nxumalo was elected to an ANC seat in the KwaZulu-Natal Provincial Legislature, ranked fourth on the ANC's provincial party list. The ANC also nominated him to chair the legislature's committee on economic development. Midway through the legislative term, in 2022, Nxumalo faced an SACP elective conference, but he was not expected to face any significant opposition to his bid to be re-elected as SACP Provincial Chairperson. Also in 2022, he was elected for the first time to a five-year term on the national Central Committee of the SACP.

== Personal life ==
In 2006, he married Busi, whom he met in 2000; they have six children together.
