= List of nature reserves in eThekwini =

This is a list of nature reserves in the eThekwini Metropolitan Municipality, South Africa (the municipality governing Durban and its surrounding suburbs). They are managed by several organizations, including the eThekwini Municipality, Ezemvelo KZN Wildlife, Msinsi Holdings, the National Ports Authority, and the Wildlife and Environment Society of South Africa (WESSA).

== eThekwini Municipality ==
The following reserves and parks are managed by the eThekwini Municipality, with some forming part of the Durban Metropolitan Open Space System (D'MOSS):

=== Central region ===
- Burman Bush
- Durban Botanic Gardens
- Pigeon Valley

=== West region ===
- Alverstone Wildlife Park
- Alfred Park
- Giba Gorge Nature Reserve
- Iphithi Nature Reserve (in partnership with Gillits Conservancy)
- Madwala Wildlife Sanctuary
- Mariannwood
- New Germany Nature Reserve
- Palmiet Nature Reserve
- Paradise Valley
- Roosfontein
- Springside
- St Helier Dam

=== South region ===
- Amanzimtoti Bird Sanctuary
- Ilanda Wilds
- Illovo Estuary
- Silverglen

=== North region ===
- Danville Park
- Seaton Park
- Umgeni River Bird Park
- Virginia Bush

== Ezemvelo KZN Wildlife ==
Ezemvelo KZN Wildlife, the provincial conservation authority in KwaZulu-Natal province, manages the following nature reserves within the bounds of the eThekwini Municipality:

- Beachwood Mangroves Nature Reserve
- Bluff Nature Reserve
- Kenneth Stainbank Nature Reserve
- Krantzkloof Nature Reserve
- North Park Nature Reserve
- uMhlanga Lagoon Nature Reserve

== Msinsi Holdings ==
Msinsi Holdings, a subsidiary of water utility Umgeni Water, manages the following resource reserves in eThekwini:

- Hazelmere Dam
- Inanda Dam
- Shongweni Dam

== National Ports Authority ==
The National Ports Authority of South Africa manages the following nature reserve:

- Bayhead Natural Heritage Site

== WESSA ==
WESSA (the Wildlife and Environment Society of South Africa), manages the following reserves, in some cases in partnership with other organisations:

- Clive Cheeseman Nature Reserve
- Empisini Nature Reserve
- Glenholme Nature Reserve (in partnership with the SPCA)
- Hawaan Forest Nature Reserve (in partnership with Tongaat-Hulett)
- Msinsi Nature Reserve (in partnership with the University of KwaZulu-Natal)
