= Umgeni Park =

- Suburb
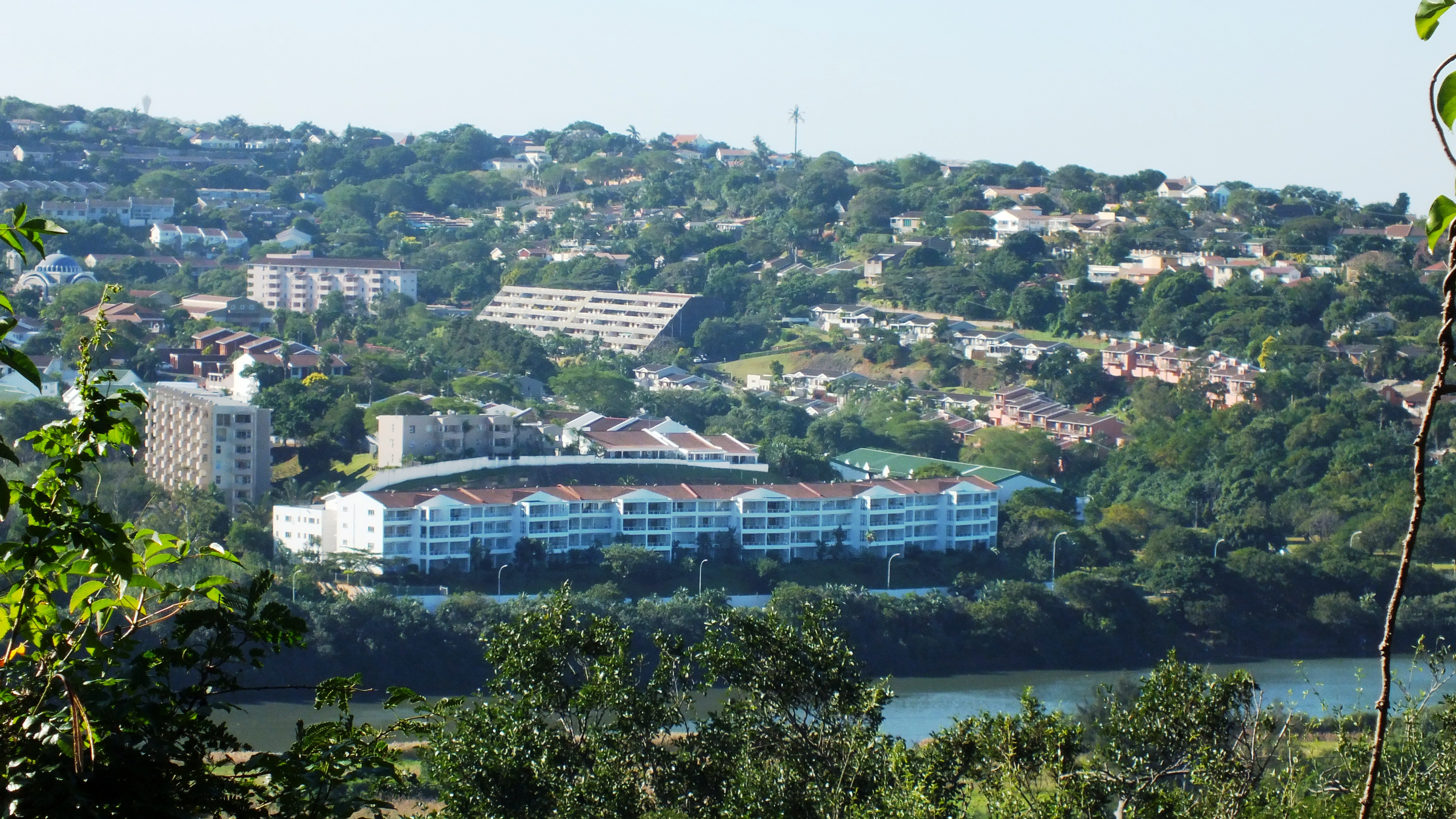
- View over Umgeni Park and the Blue Lagoon from Burman Bush

- Location within KwaZulu-Natal Location within South Africa
- Coordinates: 29.8032°S 31.0208°E
- Country: South Africa
- Province: KwaZulu-Natal
- Municipality: eThekwini

Area
  - Total: 1.85 km^{2} (0.71 sq mi)

Population (2011)
  - Total: 6,871
  - Density: 3,710/km^{2} (9,620/sq mi)

Racial makeup (2011)
  - Black African: 46.35%
  - White: 35.6%
  - Indian/Asian: 15.76%
  - Coloured: 1.19%
  - Other: 1.09%

First languages (2011)
  - English: 51.11%
  - Zulu: 27.63%
  - Xhosa: 3.98%
  - Other: 17.18%
- Time zone: UTC+2 (SAST)
- Postal code (street): 4001
- PO box: 4098

Umgeni Park is a residential area in northern Durban, KwaZulu-Natal, South Africa. Together with its neighbouring Durban North suburb of Athlone, the area is also known as Riverside, due to its location along the northern banks of the Umgeni River. The area is marked by its cluster developments and townhouse complexes, as well as free standing homes. On the western boundary of the suburb is the Briardene Informal Settlement and the Umgeni Park light industrial area.

The suburb is home to the Umgeni River Bird Park. Rosehill Primary School, on the border with the suburb of Park Hill, serves the area.

== Geography and sites ==
Umgeni Park is situated 7 kilometres (4.3 mi) north of the Durban city centre and is one of the southernmost suburbs of the greater Durban North suburban area. The suburb is bounded by Park Hill to the north, Athlone to the east, uMngeni River to the south (beyond which lies Stamford Hill) and Briardene to the west. uMngeni Park has many points of interest like the Hellenic Community Centre, Park Boulevard shopping centre, Umgeni River Bird Park and the Riverside Hotel.

== Transport ==
Umgeni Park is mainly accessed from the M21 (Riverside Road), which runs along the northern banks of the uMngeni River connecting the M4 (to uMhlanga and Durban city centre) and Prospect Hall to the east with the R102 and Springfield Park to the west.

Bordering to the west, the R102 (Chris Hani Road) connects the Umgeni Park light industrial area with Avoca to the north and the Durban city centre to the south.
