= Springfield Park (Durban) =

- Umgeni Business Park
- Location within KwaZulu-Natal Location within South Africa
- Coordinates: 29.8155°S 30.9903°E
- Country: South Africa
- Province: KwaZulu-Natal
- Municipality: eThekwini
- Main Place: Durban

Government

Area
  - Total: 4.03 km^{2} (1.56 sq mi)

Population (2011)
  - Total: 33
  - Density: 8.2/km^{2} (21/sq mi)

Racial makeup (2011)
  - Black African: 93.9%
  - Coloured: 6.1%

First languages (2011)
  - Zulu: 87.9%
  - English: 6.05%
  - Xhosa: 6.05%
- Time zone: UTC+2 (SAST)
- Postal code (street): 4051

Springfield Park, officially known as Umgeni Business Park is an industrial suburb of Durban in KwaZulu-Natal, South Africa located north-east of the city centre.

== Location ==
Springfield Park is located approximately 10 km (6.2 mi) north-east of the Durban CBD and is divided into a northern and a southern part by the uMngeni River which flows through the area.

== Business ==
The southern part of Springfield Park mainly comprises clothing retail, motor retail and hardware stores. The area is one of Durban's most popular retail nodes, encompassing two main retail centres along the M19 including: Springfield Value Centre which mainly consists of factory stores and Springfield Retail Centre which is located adjacent to the Value Centre and consists of a number of retail stores.

The Makro store adjacent the Value Centre is also one of the major features in Springfield Park, serving as the only Makro outlet within the city proper of Durban. There are two other Makro stores within the Greater Durban metropolitan area including one in Amanzimtoti, south of Durban and one in Cornubia, north of Durban.

The northern part of Springfield Park comprises various business related to home improvement, auto repair, packaging and timber among other businesses within the area.

== Infrastructure ==
=== Road infrastructure ===
The M21 (Inanda Road) is the main route through the northern part of Springfield Park heading westwards to Newlands West and KwaMashu and eastwards to Umgeni Park and Prospect Hall. The M19 (Umgeni Road) is the main route through the southern part of Springfield Park heading westwards to Westville and eastwards to the Durban city centre (via the R102).

The N2 freeway passes Springfield Park to the west, leading northwards to KwaDukuza and southwards to Port Shepstone. In passing through Springfield Park, the N2 provides direct access at the M19 Umgeni Interchange and the M21. The R102 (Chris Hani Road) passes Springfield Park to the east, leading northwards to Briardene and Avoca and southwards to the Durban city centre.
