= Banco Privado Português =

Former Portuguese investment bank

- Industry: Investment services
- Founded: 1996
- Defunct: 2010
- Fate: Bankruptcy, liquidation
- Headquarters: Lisbon, Portugal
- Key people: João Rendeiro
- Products: Financial services Investment banking Investment management
- Website: BPP Homepage (archived)

Banco Privado Português (Portuguese pronunciation: [ˈbɐ̃ku pɾiˈvaðu puɾtuˈɣeʃ], lit. 'Portuguese Private Bank', abbr. BPP) was a Portuguese private bank based in Lisbon, founded by João Rendeiro. In 2010 it was declared bankrupt.

== The BPP case ==
On 24 July 2009, Paulo Guichard and Salvador Fezas Vital, two former board committee members of BPP were suspended by Banco de Portugal, and joined João Rendeiro in the BPP case, to be indicted for falsifying accounts, tax crimes and money laundering. On 15 April 2010, the Banco de Portugal, Portugal central bank, "after verifying the impossibility of recapitalization and recovery efforts of this institution", ordered the liquidation of the Banco Privado Português.

On 11 October 2010, the Polícia Judiciária conducted searches at the homes of former officials of the BPP under the scope of an investigation into suspected money laundering and fraud. On 11 February 2013, João Rendeiro, Fezas Vital and Paul Guichard, former members of the board committee were charged by the Public Ministry with fraud, in a matter of a Collective investment scheme that damaged hundreds of clients for an estimated 41 million euros. In May 2015, assets from João Rendeiro were seized to pay a 4.7 million euro fine from the Bank of Portugal.

On 29 September 2021, João Rendeiro announced in his personal blog he would not be returning to Portugal for his trial, and international arrest warrants were issued for him. On 11 December 2021, Portuguese police announced Rendeiro had been arrested in South Africa. The arrest was made at Umhlanga Rocks, Durban by Interpol's National Crime Bureau in Pretoria, acting on an Interpol Red Notice. On 13 May 2022, Rendeiro was found dead in his prison cell in Westville Prison, Westville, KwaZulu-Natal. The cause of death was ruled to have been suicide. The extradition of Rendeiro to Portugal was planned to be decided in court in June 2022.
