= Glenholme Nature Reserve =

Nature reserve in eastern South Africa

- Location within KwaZulu-Natal
- Location: Kloof, South Africa
- Coordinates: 29°47′49″S 30°49′52″E
- Area: 42 ha (100 acres)
- Governing body: WESSA/SPCA

Glenholme Nature Reserve is a 42-hectare (100-acre) privately managed area of grassland, scarp and swamp forest in Kloof, outside of Durban, South Africa. A small stream in the reserve leads to a waterfall and gorge which forms one of the headwaters of the Umbilo River.

The reserve is managed by WESSA and the Kloof and Highway SPCA. The Glenholme Nature Reserve is accessible via a one-hour-long trail to the neighbouring Clive Cheesman Nature Reserve.
