= João Rendeiro =

Portuguese banker, entrepreneur (1952–2022)

- Born: João Manuel Oliveira Rendeiro; 22 May 1952; Lisbon, Portugal
- Died: 13 May 2022 (aged 69); Westville, KwaZulu-Natal, South Africa
- Occupations: Banker, university teacher
- Spouse: Maria de Jesus Rendeiro

João Manuel Oliveira Rendeiro (22 May 1952 – 13 May 2022) was a Portuguese banker, entrepreneur and university teacher. He was the founder of the Banco Privado Português.

== Biography ==
Rendeiro was born in Lisbon, the son of João Augusto da Silva Rendeiro and wife Joana Marques Gonçalves Oliveira, shoe store owners in Lisbon. Both of his parents were originally from Murtosa, in Aveiro District. The family moved to Lisbon and lived in Campo de Ourique, a civil parish (freguesia) of the historic center of Lisbon, and João Rendeiro attended both the reputed Salesianos private catholic school and the state-run Liceu Pedro Nunes high school in the city. He then studied economics at the Instituto Superior de Economia e Gestão (ISEG) of the Technical University of Lisbon, where he was also a teacher, and later went to the University of Sussex in England where he would be awarded a doctorate degree also in economics. While working as a university teacher in a marketing class, João Rendeiro created together with a pupil a successful mineral sparkling water brand called Frize, founded as a company in 1994 that they would later sell to Compal.

However, Rendeiro became nationally known after he founded the Banco Privado Português (BPP) in 1996, a private bank that grew considerably for several years but collapsed in 2008 and went into liquidation. His private bank followed to bankruptcy for which on 24 July 2009, Paulo Guichard and Salvador Fezas who served as two board of directors committee members of the BPP were suspended and were both joined by Rendeiro with the appointment to a case that involved indicting for falsifying accounts, money laundering and tax crimes. He had claimed that he did not know anything about its issues.

On 11 February 2013, the three of them were charged by Public Prosecution Service with indictments of intention of deception and fraud in the management of an investment fund. In a second case, on 15 October 2018, Rendeiro was sentenced by the Judicial Court of the District of Lisbon for committing computer and falsification of documents. On 14 May 2021, he was sentenced to ten years by the Lisbon District for breach of trust, money laundering and tax fraud.

On 28 September 2021, Rendeiro was sentenced by a Lisbon District court to three years of imprisonment for fraud. In the same day, it was reported that he had fled via London from Portugal and Europe to break free from the execution of his sentences. His wife Maria de Jesus Rendeiro had stayed in Portugal for Rendeiro's escape and the childless couple got an arrest warrant on 3 November 2021. Her wife was subjected to an interrogation by the Portuguese Judicial Police (PJ) for which she was placed under house arrest.

On 11 December 2021, Rendeiro was arrested in South Africa. On 23 February 2022, his ten-year sentence was upheld by the Lisbon Court of Appeal for which Rendeiro was declared with other issues. As of May 2022, the extradition of Rendeiro to Portugal was planned to be decided in court in June 2022.

=== Death ===
He died in May 2022 of suicide from hanging in his serving sentence time inside the Westville Prison, in Westville, KwaZulu-Natal.
