= Shongweni Dam and Nature Reserve =

Dam and nature reserve in Durban, South Africa

The Shongweni Dam and Nature Reserve is located outside Durban, KwaZulu-Natal. It was established in 1927 and consists of 17 thousand hectares of nature reserve.

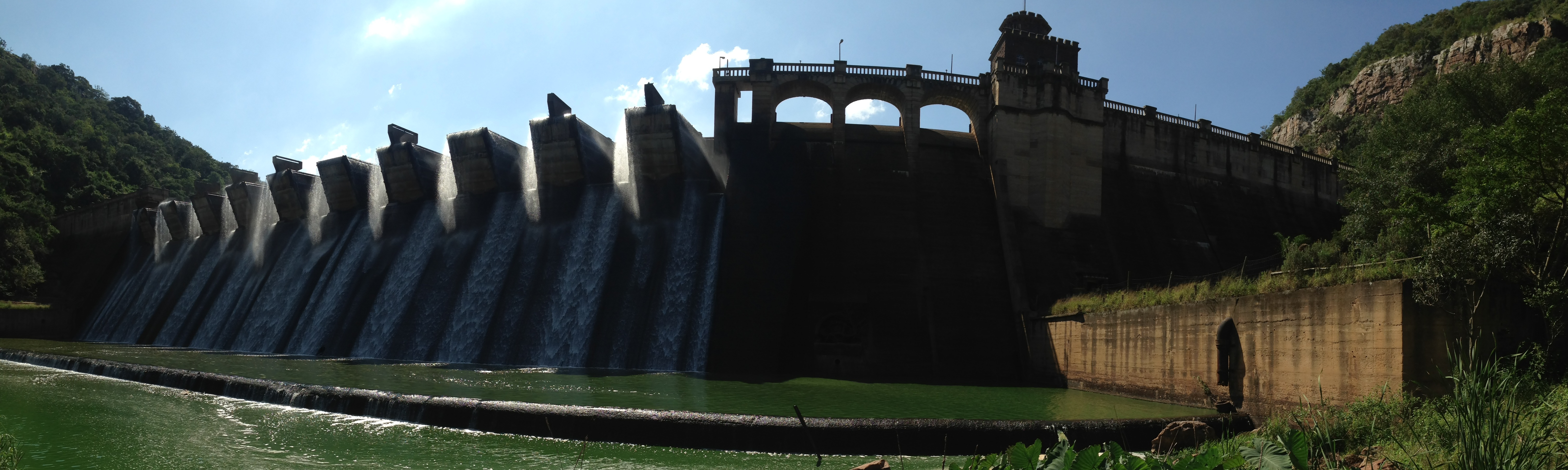
Shongweni Dam

The Reserve is eutrophic in nature and is home to a range of wildlife including, but not limited to buffalo, giraffe, wildebeest and more than 250 species of birds. The Shongweni Dam and Nature Reserve is used for both tourism and trade given its diverse wildlife, and physical activities such as canoeing and game viewing.

The Umlazi River which originates from the south west of Pietermaritzburg flows through Baynesfield, Mapstone Dam and Thornlea Dam before reaching Shongweni Dam.

== See also ==
- List of dams in South Africa
- List of nature reserves in eThekwini
