= Durban North =

- Suburb
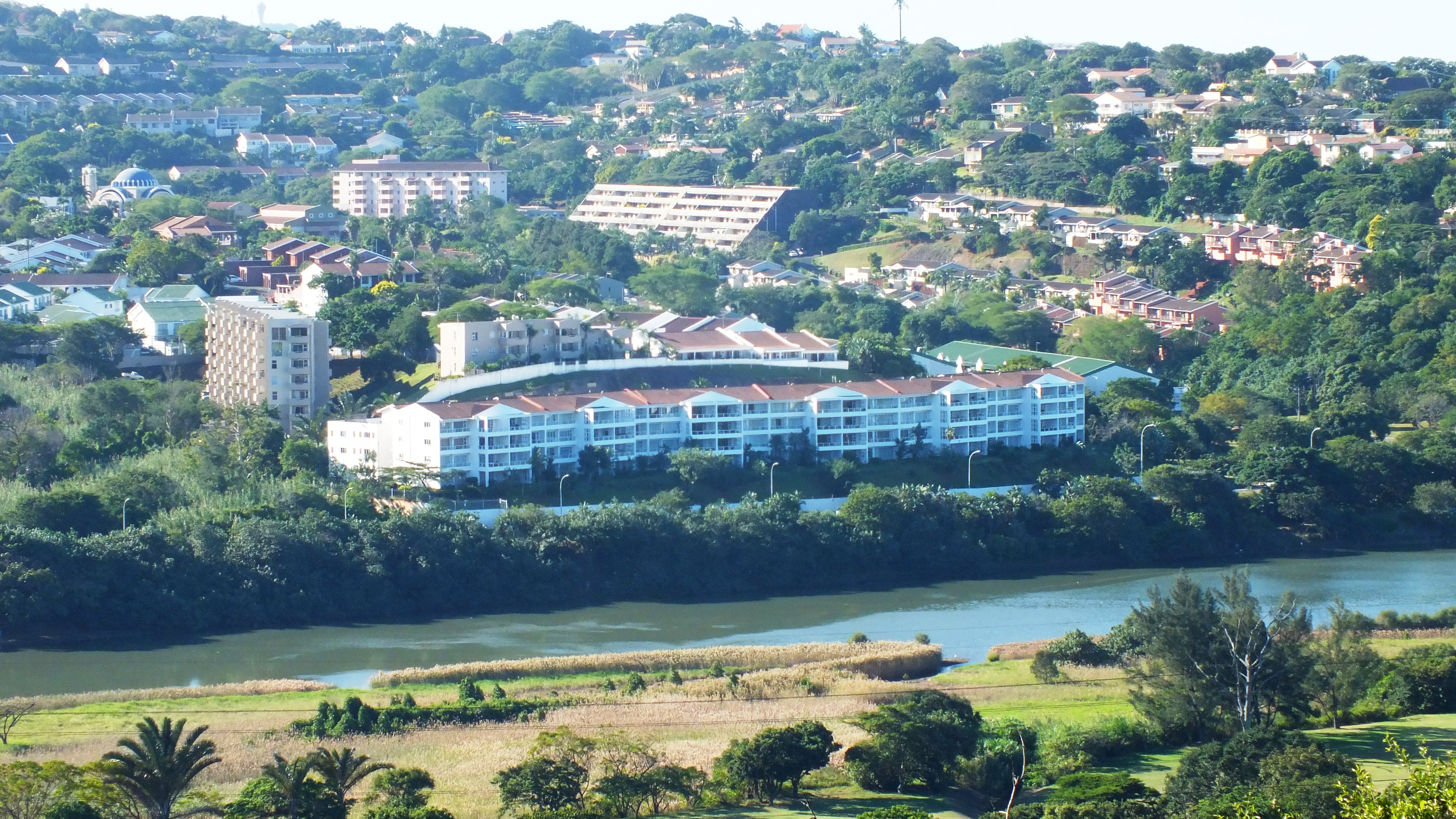
- Umgeni Park on the north bank of the Umgeni River's Blue Lagoon

- Location within KwaZulu-Natal Location within South Africa
- Coordinates: 29.8°S 31.033°E
- Country: South Africa
- Province: KwaZulu-Natal
- Municipality: eThekwini
- Main Place: Durban

Government
  - Councillor: Heinz De Boer (DA)
- Time zone: UTC+2 (SAST)
- Postal code (street): 4051
- PO box: 4016

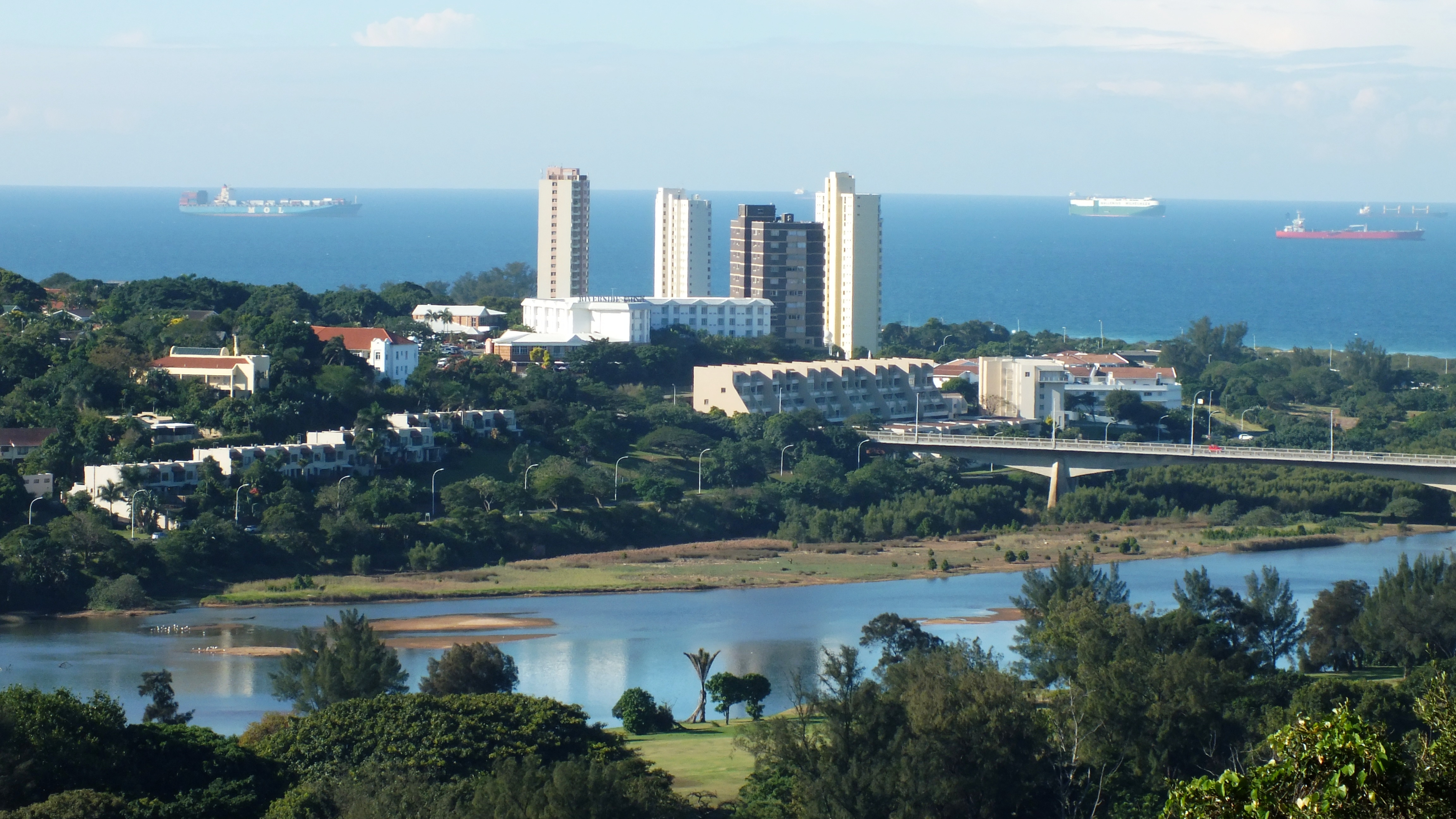
Tower blocks of Prospect Hall north of the Blue Lagoon

Durban North is an area to the north of Durban in the eThekwini Metropolitan Municipality, KwaZulu-Natal, South Africa. Durban North lies between the N2 freeway and the eastern seashore, with the Umgeni River forming its southern boundary. It has residential suburbs that are some of Durban's most affluent and is flanked by uMhlanga in the north.

== History ==
In 1927 the Durban North Estates Company, a property development company, bought a large tract of land north of the Umgeni River known as the Prospect Hall Sugar Estate. Plans were laid out for the development of the land into a residential suburb, and roads were built, beginning with Northway, to be the main arterial through the new suburb. At the time, access to the land across the Umgeni was limited to the Connaught Bridge further upstream. In November 1927, the company completed the iron girder Athlone Bridge across the Umgeni River to link the new suburb at Northway to the established area of Stamford Hill in the South. Following the completion of the bridge and enhanced access to the city, Durban North rapidly developed, followed by Virginia in the 1950s, and Glenashley in the 1970s.

== Location and suburbs ==
Durban North begins on the northern bank of the Umgeni River with the suburbs of Umgeni Park, Prospect Hall and Athlone. Along the eastern coastline northwards towards La Lucia are the suburbs of Beachwood, Virginia and Glenashley. Central Durban North is now officially known as Broadway, and is the commercial and educational hub of the area. To the west at the boundary with Avoca and are the suburbs of Parkhill, Red Hill, Glen Anil, Glen Hills, Greenwood Park, Kenville and the industrial area, Briardene.

=== Roads and airport ===
The M12 Kenneth Kaunda Road links the western suburbs of Durban North to uMhlanga Ridge in the north and Stamford Hill in the south. The Ruth First/Leo Boyd Highway (M4) connects Durban North to the city in the south and uMhlanga Rocks along the coast in the north. Virginia Airport is situated along the northern shoreline.

=== Recreation facilities, beaches and nature reserves ===
The Beachwood Mangroves Nature Reserve conserves the mangrove swamps of Beachwood on the northern bank of the Blue Lagoon. Rocket Hut Beach is adjacent to the reserve and is known for its fishing and was the scene of a shark attack in 1947 and 1954.

Beachwood Country Club abuts the mangrove swamp, with a non-swimming beach known as Beachwood. The golf course at Beachwood was redesigned by Gary Player in 1994. Virginia Beach is just north of Beachwood, alongside the Virginia Airport. Glenashley Beach is popular with locals, although it is officially a non-swimming beach.

The Umgeni River Bird Park is located on the banks of the Umgeni River in Umgeni Park. Virginia Bush Nature Reserve is located in the suburb of Virginia, while Seaton Park Nature Reserve is found in Park Hill. Durban North has a municipal swimming pool and a number of parks serviced by the eThekwini Municipality, including the Durban North Japanese Gardens.

=== Sports clubs ===
Northwood Crusaders, established in 1964, is a sportsground catering to the community and old boys of Northwood School. Crusaders, as it is popularly known, has extensive sporting facilities for cricket, rugby, soccer, and athletics. At the site of the old Glenwood Old Boys' Club is Riverside Sports, which offers rugby and soccer fields along with two artificial turfs for hockey. Durban North is home to the Regent Harriers, an informal running club that has been meeting since 1960.

== Education ==
There are a number of independent and government schools in the area. Independent higher education provider Varsity College has a campus in Durban North.

=== Government Schools ===
- Chelsea Preparatory School
- Danville Park Girls' High School
- Durban North College
- Glenashley Preparatory
- Northcrest Primary School
- Northlands Primary School
- Northlands Girls' High School
- Northwood School
- Rose Hill Primary School
- Virginia Preparatory School
- Greenwood Park Primary School
- Parkhill Secondary School
- Effingham Primary School
- Effingham Secondary School
- Columbia Primary School

=== Private schools ===
- Oakridge College
- Our Lady of Fatima Convent School
- Hamptons High School
- St Barnabas Independent School

== Safety ==
Durban North is divided over two SAPS precincts. The section east of uMhlanga Rocks Drive and Kenneth Kaunda Road is covered by Durban North SAPS (located in Broadway) and the section west of uMhlanga Rocks Drive and Kenneth Kaunda Road is covered by Greenwood Park SAPS.
