= Durban Metropolitan Open Space System =

The Durban Metropolitan Open Space System (D'MOSS) is a system of green corridors in the city of Durban, South Africa. Implemented in 1982, the system links a number of significant conservation sites and nature reserves, allowing a path for the free movement of fauna and flora.

D'MOSS is managed by the eThekwini Metropolitan Municipality, the metropolitan body that oversees the greater Durban area. As of 2015, the system represents one-third of the eThekwini Municipal Area, at 74 500 hectares. The objective of the project is the conservation of natural areas, while providing recreation facilities for the public.

D'MOSS manages a number of nature reserves and parks in the Ethekwini Metropolitan boundaries:

- Burman Bush Nature Reserve
- Danville Park
- Pigeon Valley Park
- Seaton Park
- Silverglen Nature Reserve
- Virginia Bush Nature Reserve
