= M19 (Durban) =

Metropolitan route in eThekwini, South Africa

Metropolitan route M19

Route information
- Maintained by the eThekwini Metropolitan Municipality
- Length: 18 km (11 mi)

Major junctions
- West end: M7 / M13 in Pinetown
- M31 in Pinetown M32 in Pinetown; M5 in New Germany M32 in Westville; N2 in Reservoir Hills; M10 in Springfield Park
- East end: R102 in Durban

Location
- Country: South Africa
- Towns: Pinetown, Westville, Durban

Highway system
- Numbered routes of South Africa
← M17	→ M20

The M19 is a metropolitan route in the eThekwini Metropolitan Municipality, South Africa, connecting Pinetown to Springfield Park in Durban.

== Route ==
The M19 begins at the M13 off-ramp intersection with the M7 in Pinetown and follows a route north as a dual-carriage roadway named 'St Johns Avenue'.

Shortly after, it then meets the M31 (Josiah Gumede Road) in the Pinetown CBD and proceeds north-east. At the M32 Shepstone Rd/Beviss Rd intersection, the M19 leaves Pinetown to enter New Germany as a dual-carriageway freeway and passes under the M5 Otto Volek Road off-ramp. It then turns eastwards at the M32 Roger Sishi Road off-ramp before proceeding through Westville.

A few kilometres after Dunkeld Road off-ramp, it enters Durban at Reservoir Hills, turns in northeast, passes over the Mountbatten Drive off-ramp and turns in a southeasterly direction. Hereafter, it ends as a freeway east of Reservoir Hills at the massive Umgeni Interchange with the N2 freeway (to KwaDukuza and Port Shepstone).

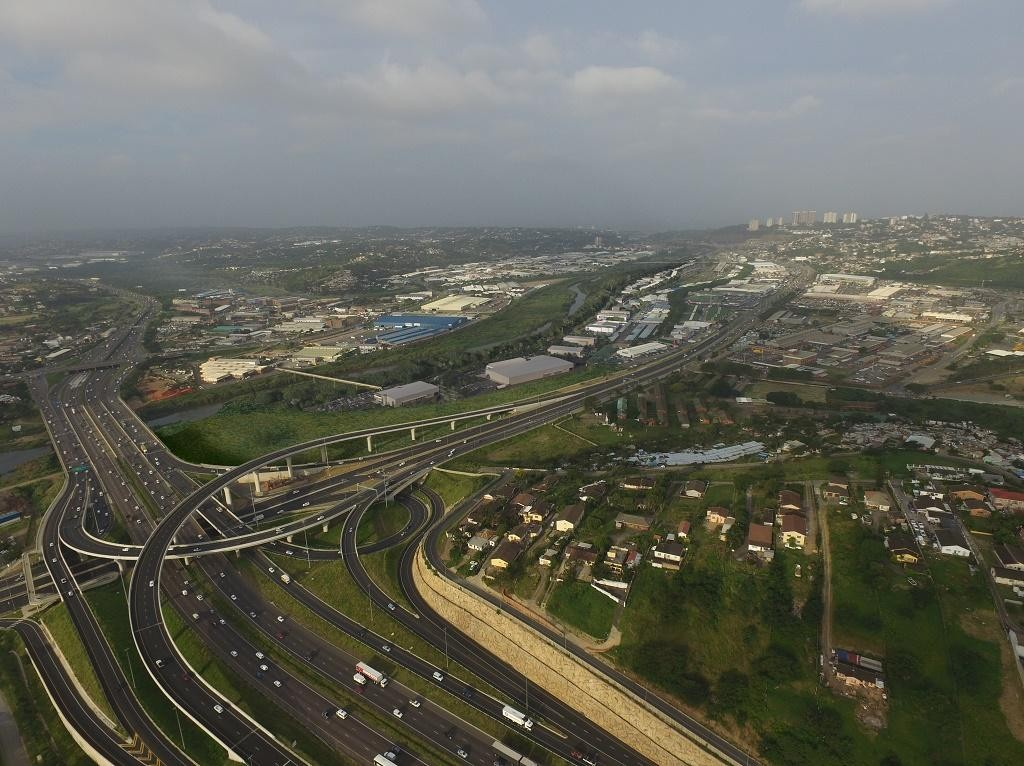
The M19 intersecting with the N2 at the Umgeni Interchange

It continues southeast as a dual-carriage roadway named 'Umgeni Road' through the Springfield Park industrial area and turns in an easterly direction before ending at an interchange with the R102 Chris Hani Road/Umgeni Road (to Avoca and the Durban city centre).
