= The Pavilion (mall) =

Shopping Centre in Westville, KwaZulu-Natal, South Africa

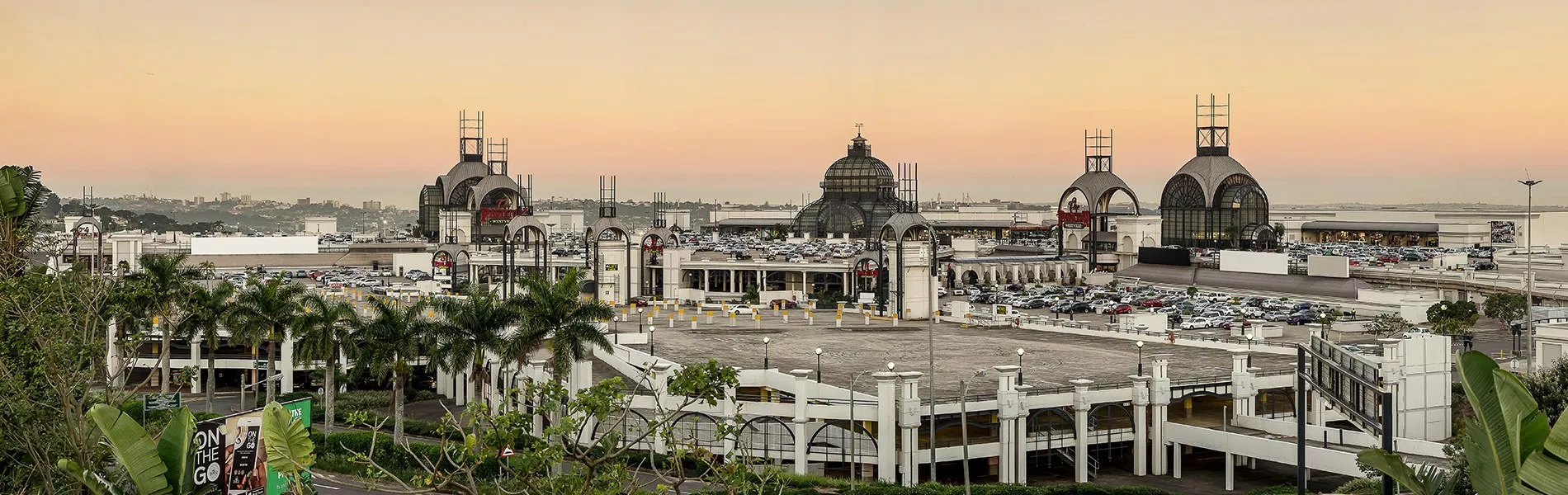
- Exterior of The Pavilion Shopping Centre
- Interactive map of the The Pavilion area
- Alternative names: The Pav

General information
- Location: Westville, KwaZulu-Natal, South Africa
- Completed: October 1993
- Inaugurated: October 1993

Technical details
- Floor count: 5
- Floor area: 135,000 m^{2} (1,450,000 sq ft)

Other information
- Number of stores: 285

Website
- www.thepav.co.za

The Pavilion is a regional shopping centre located in Westville, west of Durban, South Africa and is the second largest shopping centre in the Greater Durban metropolitan area, and one of the largest in South Africa. The mall has gone through many phases of extensions.

== History ==
The mall was developed in the early 90s and opened in October 1993 by Murray and Roberts, (now Concor), to initially provide 75,000 m^{2} (810,000 sq ft) of shopping space. Subsequently, the centre has gone through six phases of expansion, the most recent of which was completed in 2014, bringing the floor space to just under 135,000 m^{2} (1,450,000 sq ft). An additional 35,000 m^{2} (380,000 sq ft) expansion is planned for 2018.
