= Bayhead Natural Heritage Site =

- Bayhead Mangrove Swamps
- Location within South Africa
- Location: Durban Bay, KwaZulu-Natal, South Africa
- Nearest city: Durban
- Coordinates: 29°53′32″S 31°0′40″E
- Area: 20 ha (49 acres)
- Governing body: Transnet National Ports Authority

Bayhead Natural Heritage Site, also known as the Bayhead Mangrove Swamps, is a 20 ha (49 acres) nature reserve protecting mangrove forest and coastal grassland within the industrial area of Durban Bay, KwaZulu-Natal, South Africa. The reserve is a remnant of what was once the largest mangrove swamp in the province, which originally covered approximately 440 hectares around the edges of the bay. Three species of mangrove occur within the reserve, along with an area of coastal grassland.

The site supports a variety of wildlife, including up to 120 species of aquatic birds, various crab species, and mudskippers. A boardwalk and environmental education centre are located on site. The reserve is managed by the Transnet National Ports Authority.

== History ==
=== Original extent and colonial-era destruction ===
Prior to European settlement and harbour development, mangroves were extensive around the edges of Durban Bay, covering an area of approximately 438-440 hectares. The largest mangrove area lost in South Africa, 440 hectares, occurred during the construction of Durban Bay harbour.

In 1889, Durban's Nuisance Inspector, W.C. Daugherty, examined the mangroves along the coastline of Congella and recommended their removal as a "great sanitary improvement", claiming that decomposing leaves and berries in the mud carried diseases. Despite petitions from Congella residents—who argued that the mangroves were aesthetically pleasing and may have helped eliminate malaria, the Harbour Board passed a resolution to remove the trees to make space for commercial shipping facilities. Approximately 60 acres of Congella mangroves were removed by the end of the 19th century.

Throughout the 20th century, Durban systematically destroyed its remaining mangroves for harbour expansion and urban development. Mangrove forest is now classified as 'Critically Endangered' in South Africa, with much of its original extent lost as a result of harbour development, urban development, and degradation through unfavourable agricultural practices inland.

=== 2015 oil spill ===
In March 2015, a fire broke out at the Africa Sun Oil Refineries on South Coast Road in Mobeni. The fire ruptured pipes at the facility, causing vegetable oil to leak into nearby canals and subsequently into Durban Harbour.

The Department of Environmental Affairs issued a directive to Africa Sun Oil under Section 30(6) of the National Environmental Management Act, requiring the company to prevent the spread of oil into the mangroves, natural heritage site, and sandbanks. Approximately 663,430 litres of oil was recovered during clean-up operations. However, some mangroves within the upper part of the Silt Canal and Bayhead area could not be saved. Damages were provisionally estimated at R100 million.

== Ecology ==
=== Mangrove species ===
Three species of mangrove occur at Bayhead, as elsewhere along the KwaZulu-Natal coast:

- White mangrove (Avicennia marina) – A primary coloniser that creates conditions allowing other mangrove species to establish. It eliminates excess salt through glands on its leaves.
- Black mangrove (Bruguiera gymnorhiza) – Characterised by stabilising buttress roots and underground cable roots that loop upward to form "knee roots" for oxygen intake.
- Red mangrove (Rhizophora mucronata) – Named for the mucro (needle-like point) on the leaf tip. It has extensive prop roots that can extend up to 30 metres, anchoring and stabilising the tree.

Mangroves in South Africa occur at one of the most southerly locations in the world, restricted by the exposed, high-energy coastline to 32 sheltered estuaries.

=== Fauna ===
==== Birds ====
The reserve attracts a high number of waterbirds despite its location within an industrial harbour. Up to 120 species of aquatic birds have been recorded in Durban Bay.

The Mangrove kingfisher (Halcyon senegaloides) is associated with the mangrove habitats of Durban Bay. This species was first described by Andrew Smith in 1834 from specimens collected around Port Natal (now Durban). According to the SANBI Red List, the species has declined in Durban Bay as mangrove habitat has decreased, with the wintering population in KwaZulu-Natal estimated at between 25 and 110 individuals.

==== Crustaceans ====
The intertidal mudflats support various crab species. Fiddler crabs, recognisable by the male's single enlarged claw, are among the most conspicuous inhabitants. Five fiddler crab species occur in South Africa, with the mangroves representing the southernmost distribution limit for several species. Species likely present include Paraleptuca chlorophthalmus, a common fiddler crab found in East African mangroves from Somalia to South Africa, and Austruca occidentalis, a Western Indian Ocean species.

The Red Mangrove Crab feeds on fallen mangrove leaves, collecting them and taking them into its burrows. The sesarmid crab Chiromantes eulimene also burrows in the mangroves, feeding on leaf-litter and decaying organic matter, thereby facilitating decomposition processes and nutrient cycling.

==== Fish ====
Mudskippers inhabit the mudflats, using their modified pectoral fins to propel themselves across mud surfaces out of the water. The Barred mudskipper (Periophthalmus argentilineatus) occurs along the East African coast from Zululand in South Africa northwards, and is one of the most widespread Indo-Pacific mudskippers.

== Conservation ==
Mangrove forest in South Africa is classified as 'Critically Endangered'. The Bayhead Natural Heritage Site, together with the Beachwood Mangroves Nature Reserve at the Umgeni River mouth, represents one of only two protected mangrove remnants in the Durban area.

The site faces ongoing threats from industrial pollution due to its location within the harbour. Mangroves provide important ecosystem services including coastal protection against extreme weather, shoreline stabilisation, habitat provision for wildlife, and carbon sequestration.

== Facilities and access ==
The reserve features a boardwalk that winds through the mangroves, a bird hide, and an environmental education centre. Opening hours are 06:00 to 18:00. Dogs are not permitted.

Access is via Bayhead Road and Langeberg Road (Gate 7 entrance towards National Ports Authority).

== See also ==
- Beachwood Mangroves Nature Reserve
- Port of Durban
- Mangroves
- List of protected areas of South Africa
