= Paradise Valley Nature Reserve =

- IUCN category IV (habitat/species management area)
- Interactive map of Paradise Valley Nature Reserve
- Location: Pinetown, KwaZulu-Natal, South Africa
- Nearest city: Durban
- Coordinates: 29°50′20″S 30°53′35″E
- Area: 170 ha (420 acres)
- Established: 1950
- Governing body: eThekwini Municipality

Paradise Valley Nature Reserve is a protected area located in Pinetown, KwaZulu-Natal, South Africa. The reserve spans 170 hectares of coastal forest and grassland, centered around a gorge carved by the Umbilo River.

== History ==
The area that became Paradise Valley Nature Reserve was originally part of a farm owned by Francis Drake, son of Commodore Drake R.N., in 1850. The reserve was established in 1950 after Pinetown became a borough in 1948. The construction of the M13 national road in 1952 made the valley accessible to the public. The reserve gradually expanded from its original 25 hectares to the current 170 hectares, encompassing land along the Umbilo valley.

=== Umbilo Waterworks ===
One of the reserve's most significant heritage features is the remains of the historic Umbilo Waterworks, established in 1887 to supply water to early Durban. The waterworks complex included a 159 megalitre storage dam, a 27 megalitre settling dam, and water pipelines. Materials were transported by ox-wagon from Pinetown Bridge station (later Sarnia station) to construct the facility.

The waterworks operated until 1905, when catastrophic flooding during a 15-hour rainstorm that dropped 397mm of rain led to the dam wall failing. The resulting flood released 150 megalitres of water, causing significant destruction along the lower Umbilo riverbanks. With Durban having developed alternative water supplies by this time, the dam was never rebuilt.

Today, the remaining structures of the waterworks include:

- Stone reservoir remains
- Sand filter beds
- Stone pipeline supports
- Remnants of the original dam wall

The Umbilo Waterworks ruins are a Provincial Heritage Site under the KwaZulu-Natal Heritage Act.

=== Indigo Vats ===
The reserve also contains the historic Indigo Vats, located on Portion of Erf 3079 Pinetown. These structures were constructed by two Dutch immigrants, Colenbrander and Van Prehn, and were used between 1854 and 1856 for the manufacture of indigo dye.The structures were declared a National Monument on 25 October 1974 under the National Monuments Act 28 of 1969. They are now classified as a Heritage Landmark (in private ownership) under Section 39 of the KwaZulu-Natal Heritage Act, equivalent to a Grade II Provincial Heritage Site.

== Geography and environment ==
The reserve features steep forested gorges along the Umbilo River, including a prominent waterfall. The vegetation consists primarily of coastal scarp forest with areas of grassland on the periphery. The reserve has significant heritage value for its aesthetic, scientific, social and historical aspects.

== Facilities and activities ==
The reserve offers:

- Hiking trails
- Picnic areas
- Environmental education programs
- Bird watching opportunities

== See also ==
- List of protected areas of KwaZulu-Natal
- Pinetown
- Umbilo River
