= Athlone, Durban =

Northern suburb of Durban, South Africa

Athlone
- Suburb
- Location within KwaZulu-Natal Location within South Africa
- Coordinates: 29°47′50″S 31°01′51″E
- Country: South Africa
- Province: KwaZulu-Natal
- Municipality: eThekwini
- Main Place: Durban

Area
  - Total: 1.38 km^{2} (0.53 sq mi)

Population (2011)
  - Total: 2,851
  - Density: 2,070/km^{2} (5,350/sq mi)

Racial makeup (2011)
  - White: 65.28%
  - Indian/Asian: 16.98%
  - Black African: 16.17%
  - Coloured: 0.91%
  - Other: 0.67%

First languages (2011)
  - English: 83.76%
  - Zulu: 7.33%
  - Afrikaans: 4.95%
  - Other: 3.96%
- Time zone: UTC+2 (SAST)
- Postal code (street): 4051

Athlone is a northern suburb of Durban, South Africa. The area is located to the north of the uMngeni River, and together with neighboring Umgeni Park is known colloquially as Riverside.

The Athlone Bridge built in 1927 over the Umgeni River, links the suburb and greater Durban North to the central suburb of Stamford Hill.

== Geography ==
Athlone is situated 7 kilometres (4.3 mi) north of the Durban city centre and is one of the southernmost suburbs of the greater Durban North suburban area. The suburb is bounded by Broadway to the north, Prospect Hall to the east, uMngeni River to the south, as well as Park Hill and Umgeni Park to the west.

== Transport ==
The M12, named Kenneth Kaunda Road (previously known as Northway), is the main arterial through Athlone. To the north, it connects to the Durban North suburbs of Broadway, Glenashley and Glen Anil, as well as uMhlanga, while to the south, it provides access to Stamford Hill and the Durban city centre.

To the east beyond Prospect Hall, the M4 (Ruth First Highway) is the main freeway connecting Durban North with uMhlanga to the north and the Durban city centre to the south. Access to Athlone is provided via the M21 interchange, from which local streets connect Prospect Hall to Athlone, as the M21 does not directly serve the suburb.
