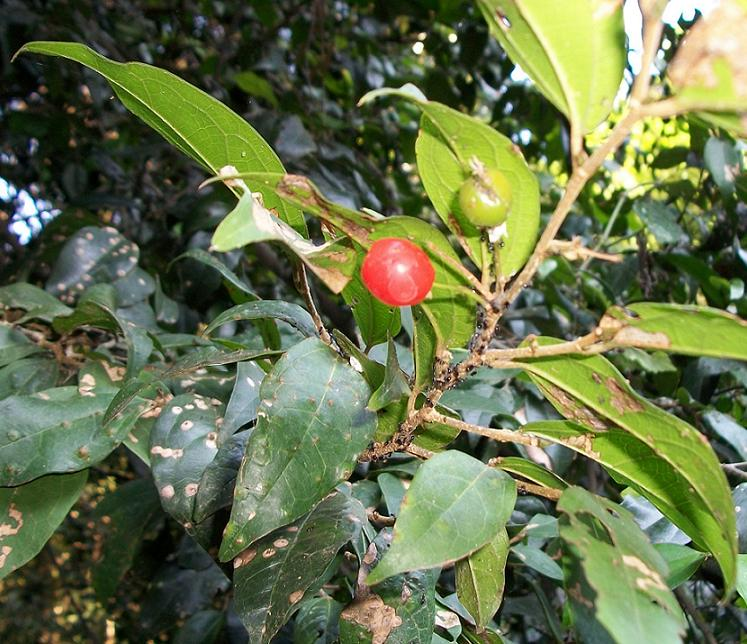
- Leaves and fruit of Celtis mildbraedii

Conservation status
- Least Concern (IUCN 3.1)

Scientific classification
- Kingdom: Plantae
- Clade: Tracheophytes
- Clade: Angiosperms
- Clade: Eudicots
- Clade: Rosids
- Order: Rosales
- Family: Cannabaceae
- Genus: Celtis
- Species: C. mildbraedii

Binomial name
- Celtis mildbraedii Engl.

Synonyms
- Celtis bequaertii De Wild.; Celtis compressa A.Chev.; Celtis dubia De Wild.; Celtis franksiae N.E.Br.; Celtis usambarensis Engl.

= Celtis mildbraedii =

Species of flowering plant

Celtis mildbraedii is a species of forest tree in the family Cannabaceae. It was previously assigned to the family Ulmaceae. These trees grow in limited areas of South Africa, Mozambique and Zimbabwe. They are also found in forested areas from West Africa to Sudan, DRC, Angola and Tanzania. Common names include natal white stinkwood, red-fruited white-stinkwood and natal elm. This species is more common in Tropical Africa than in Southern Africa.

There are about forty specimens in Pigeon Valley Natural Heritage Park, Durban, South Africa. The southernmost specimen is found in Ilanda Wilds Nature Reserve in Amanzimtoti.

The fruit of the tree turns red as it ripens but viable seed is difficult to find. No Natal White Stinkwoods were available from plant nurseries in South Africa in 2009 suggesting that this tree species is not being propagated, despite its rarity in South Africa.

This tree is a dominant species in the moist semi-deciduous forests of Ghana along with Triplochiton scleroxylon and African Mahogany (Khaya ivorensis). The trees were common in Ajenjua Bepo and Mamang River Forest Reserves in Ghana.

In Uganda the tree is used for timber and is a primate food source in Budongo Forest Reserve. A study of correlations between seedling and adult tree densities of Celtis mildbraedii here, suggested that this species had a healthy regeneration pattern.

== Bibliography ==
- Pooley, E. (1993). The Complete Field Guide to Trees of Natal, Zululand and Transkei. ISBN 0-620-17697-0.
- Hyde, M.A. & Wursten, B. (2010). Flora of Zimbabwe: Species information: Celtis mildbraedii.
- Vordzogbe, V. V. et al. The Flora and Mammals of the Moist Semi-Deciduous Forest Zone in the Sefi-Wiawso District of the Western Region, Ghana. University of Ghana.
