= Roosfontein Nature Reserve =

Protected South African nature area

- Location within KwaZulu-Natal
- Location: Durban, South Africa
- Coordinates: 29.857747°S 30.930213°E
- Area: 150 ha (370 acres)
- Established: 1985
- Governing body: eThekwini Metropolitan Municipality

Roosfontein Nature Reserve is a protected nature area in Durban, KwaZulu-Natal, South Africa. Threatened protected species such as the Dwarf Chameleon and Tephrosia inandensis are found in the reserve, which is an example of North Coast Grassland.

== History ==
The area was originally a farm named after Voortrekker pioneer Francois Roos. The nature reserve was established in 1985 and further enlarged in 1992 with land from the nearby Westville Prison. The reserve was proclaimed as a national protected area in 2015, after environmental activists successfully lobbied against development of the land.
