= Reservoir Hills =

- Location within KwaZulu-Natal Location within South Africa
- Coordinates: 29.794°S 30.938°E
- Country: South Africa
- Province: KwaZulu-Natal
- Municipality: eThekwini
- Main Place: Durban

Area
  - Total: 9.51 km^{2} (3.67 sq mi)

Population (2011)
  - Total: 19,143
  - Density: 2,010/km^{2} (5,210/sq mi)

Racial makeup (2011)
  - Black African: 34%
  - Coloured: 2.2%
  - Indian/Asian: 61%
  - White: 0.5%
  - Other: 1.2%

First languages (2011)
  - Zulu: 20.6%
  - English: 65.8%
  - Xhosa: 5.6%
  - Afrikaans: 1.8%
  - Other: 6.2%
- Time zone: UTC+2 (SAST)
- Postal code (street): 4091
- PO box: 4090
- Area code: 031

Reservoir Hills is a suburb of Durban, KwaZulu-Natal, South Africa. It is administered by the eThekwini Metropolitan Municipality and its postal code is 4091. It was named after the local reservoir located at the highest peak and the vast rolling hills. Reservoir Hills was an affluent, predominantly Indian suburb during the apartheid era.

It is located north of Westville (which was a predominantly White suburb prior to democracy in South Africa) and Palmiet, east of Clermont, south of Newlands West and west of the Papwa Sewgolum Golf Course.

== Notable residents ==
- Sukhraj Chotai (1912–1981), prominent politician, philanthropist and member of the education board – As an official of the South African Hindu Maha Sabha, he spearheaded a campaign for the introduction of Hindu religious instruction in Indian schools. As an official of the Hindi Shiksha Sangh S. A., he successfully campaigned for the teaching of Hindi in Indian schools. He also commissioned and funded the construction of the Aryan Benevolent Home.
