= Sydney Skaife =

South African entomologist and naturalist (1889-1976)

Sydney Harold Skaife
- Born: 12 December 1889; London, England
- Died: 6 November 1976 (aged 86); Hout Bay, Cape Town, South Africa
- Education: University of Cape Town; Natal University College; University of Leipzig
- Scientific career
- Fields: Entomology

Sydney Harold Skaife ('Stacey') D.Sc. FRSSAf. (12 December 1889 – 6 November 1976) was an eminent South African entomologist and naturalist. His career and educational publications covered a wide field. Especially in his later years his main research interest was in social insects and the transitional phases in sociality, particularly in the Hymenoptera and Isoptera. He wrote detective novels using the pseudoynm Hendrik Brand.

He was also a school inspector, prolific author of scientific and popular books, broadcaster, and conservationist. Of his many achievements his greatest was probably his leading role in the creation of the Cape of Good Hope Nature Reserve between Cape Town and Cape Point. He lived for most of his life in Hout Bay on the Cape Peninsula.

== Early life ==
Skaife was born in London, England, to Katherine and John Skaife. He spent his boyhood in Bath, Somerset and went to St Marks Grammar School. Educated at Reading University, England, he initially studied in the Arts, even though his passion lay with Biology. In 1911 he took the Intermediate BA examination of London University because Reading at that stage was not a university and could not confer a degree. He then studied for a Teacher's Diploma and passed it with distinction.

In 1912 he went to the University of Leipzig in Germany, at the urging of his uncle. He stayed with the Schober family. During this period he taught English to earn some extra money.

In 1913 he went to Cape Town to teach biology at the Rondebosch Boys High School. When World War I broke out in 1914, he tried to enlist for service, but was turned down on medical grounds due to an irregular heart beat, which was later found to be harmless.

He was then offered and accepted a post as entomologist at the Rosebank Research Station in Cape Town. Here he worked on insects that fed on stored grain. This was a particularly urgent issue at the time, since large quantities of grain were being stored at the Cape as part of the war effort.

== Later career ==
On 29 September 1917 he married Elsie Mary Croft, a pianist. After his marriage he was transferred to the Cedara College of Agriculture in Natal where he worked on bees and wattle bagworm infestation.

In 1918 he became the first South African to receive a Carnegie Grant for further study. In 1920 he received an MSc at the Natal University College. From 1921 to 1945 he was the Inspector of Science in the Cape Department of Education. In 1922 he received a PhD from the University of Cape Town for his research on bean weevils or the subfamily Bruchinae. Africa has a rich Bruchid fauna, many of them dependent on thorn trees and other indigenous leguminous plants. In the relaxed railway schedules of the time, he sometimes found opportunities to collect new species from thorn trees during halts.

During this period he found time to edit Nature Notes (1924–1931) and become one of the first people to make a radio broadcast in South Africa, in which he talked on scorpions (1925).

In 1929 he established the Wild Life Protection and Conservation Society (now called the Wildlife and Environment Society of South Africa, WESSA), largely as a result of his concern at the widespread destruction of game in Zululand as part of the tsetse fly control campaign. In his capacity as chairman, he helped to establish the Outeniqua Mountain Zebra Reserve, the Bontebok Park, and the Addo Elephant Reserve.

During the period 1935–1945 he was director of the School Broadcasting Service. In 1939, largely through his efforts, the Cape of Good Hope Nature Reserve was established.

He became president of the Entomological Society of Southern Africa in 1940, served as chairman of the newly created Fisheries Development Corporation from 1945 to 1951, and during this same period was a member of the Board of Governors of the South African Broadcasting Corporation. In 1950 he was elected president of the Royal Society of South Africa and from 1950 to 1957 he acted as vice-chairman of the board of Trustees of the South African Museum. In 1951 he became chairman of the Fisheries Commission of Northern Rhodesia.

In 1952 he retired to his home in Hout Bay and did extensive research on the social behaviour of ants, bees and wasps which resulted in the publication of some books. In his book on termites, and other papers, he published ground-breaking work on the dynamics and ecology of termite mounds and the means of studying them. He also wrote a book on ants, and a number of scientific publications on various topics, including possible routes to sociality from primitive bees such as South African carpenter bees.

In 1952 he was awarded the South African Medal and Grant for scientific research by the South African Association for the Advancement of Science.

In 1953 he visited the UK where he spoke about his research work over the BBC and attended the Annual Congress of the British Association in Belfast, Northern Ireland.

In 1957 he was awarded a D.Sc. (honoris causa) by the University of Natal, and despite having retired became the president of the Zoological Society of South Africa in 1960. He also found time to lecture in Medical Entomology at the University of Cape Town and serve as president of the then South African Association for the Advancement of Science.

On 6 November 1976 he died at Hout Bay in the Cape Peninsula.

A daughter and son were born from this marriage:

- Mary Katherine Rowan "Bunty" d1986 – an eminent ornithologist and author
- John Skaife b1927

== Published works ==
- Animal Life in South Africa (Miller, Cape Town 1920)
- The Strange Old Man (Longmans, Green & Co., London, 1930)
- South African Nature Notes (Maskew Miller, Cape Town, c1938)
- African Insect Life (Longmans, Green & Co., London, 1953)
- Dwellers in Darkness – an Introduction to the Study of Termites (Longmans Green & Co., London, 1956)
- Reminiscences of a Naturalist (1958)
- The Study of Ants (Longmans, 1961)
- The Weaker Sex – Brochure based on a series of six talks broadcast in the English Service of the SABC during Feb and March 1961.
- A Naturalist Remembers (Longmans, Cape Town, 1963)
- The Amazing World of the Ant (South African Broadcasting Corporation)
- The Outdoor World of Africa (Longmans, Cape Town)
- African Insect Life – revised edition by Ledger & Bannister (Struik, Cape Town 1979)
- Adriaan Hugo – series of Afrikaans detective novels under the pseudonym of Hendrik Brand
