= Msinsi Nature Reserve =

Grassland reserve in Durban, South Africa

Msinsi Nature Reserve is a seven hectare private nature reserve on the grounds of the University of KwaZulu Natal's Howard College Campus in Glenwood, Durban. The reserve protects one of the last remaining patches of natural grassland in Durban. The name "Msinsi" is Zulu for the Erythrina Iysistemon or Coral Tree which is found within its boundaries. The reserve is home to a number of small mammals and birds, and was once the site of a mango tree plantation, some of which remain today.
