= Virginia Bush Nature Reserve =

Nature reserve in Durban, South Africa

- Location within KwaZulu-Natal
- Location: Durban, South Africa
- Coordinates: 29.76984°S 31.0445293°E
- Area: 38 ha (94 acres)
- Governing body: D'MOSS

Virginia Bush Nature Reserve is a 38 hectare coastal bush reserve in the suburb of Durban North, Durban, South Africa. The reserve is currently under the auspices of the Durban Metropolitan Open Space System (D'MOSS).

== History ==
Previously natural grassland, the area was once used for market gardening and military purposes, but is now a demarcated municipal nature reserve. The area is in the process of being proclaimed a national nature reserve.

== Flora and fauna ==
=== Birds ===
The following birds can be in Virginia Bush: the natal robin, bluebilled firefinch, boubou shrike, bush shrike, flycatcher, green twinspot, grey waxbill, purple crested-lourie and the whitebrowed robin.

=== Mammals ===
Dwarf mongoose, red and white duiker and spotted genets are known to inhabit the area.

=== Vegetation ===
Wild hibiscus, natal figs and milkwood trees are found in the reserve. Many of the species of vegetation are alien.
