= Mariannwood =

Mariannwood Nature Reserve
- Location within KwaZulu-Natal
- Location: Pinetown, South Africa
- Coordinates: 29°50′06″S 30°50′12″E
- Area: 12 ha (30 acres)
- Governing body: eThekwini Metropolitan Municipality

Mariannwood Nature Reserve is a 12 hectare protected area in Pinetown, KwaZulu-Natal in South Africa. The park consists of scarp and riverine forest, as well as grasslands. The Grasslands are noted for their flowers during the spring months.

The park has self-guided trails and picnic facilities.
