= Madwala Wildlife Sanctuary =

South African Nature Reserve

Madwala Wildlife Sanctuary Reserve
- Location within KwaZulu-Natal
- Location: Assagay, South Africa
- Coordinates: 29°45′37″S 30°44′15″E
- Area: 102 ha (250 acres)
- Governing body: eThekwini Metropolitan Municipality

Madwala Wildlife Sanctuary is a 102 hectare nature reserve in Assagay, Outer West Durban, South Africa. The reserve is managed by the eThekwini Municipality and is home to a number of mammals and birds.

Working for Water, an initiative of the South African government's Department of Water Affairs, is working to remove invasive alien plants from the area.
