= Alverstone Wildlife Park =

Protected area in South Africa

- Location within KwaZulu-Natal
- Location: Hillcrest, South Africa
- Coordinates: 29.779833°S 30.7309149°E
- Area: 100 ha (250 acres)
- Established: 1997
- Governing body: eThekwini Metropolitan Municipality

Alverstone Wildlife Park is a 100 hectare nature reserve near Hillcrest, KwaZulu-Natal, South Africa. The reserve was created in 1997 by a group of neighbouring landowners.

The wildlife park has a diverse ecosystem, which includes grasslands, a forest, and wetlands. A number of mammals can be found in the reserve, including duiker, bushbuck, bushpig, civet, genet, mongoose and rock hyrax. Herds of blesbok, blue wildebeest, impala and zebra have been introduced to the reserve.
