= Danville Park =

- Location within KwaZulu-Natal
- Location: Durban, South Africa
- Coordinates: 29°46′12″S 31°03′10″E
- Area: 7 ha (17 acres)
- Governing body: D'MOSS

Danville Park is a green lung of protected coastal lowland forest and wetland in Durban North, South Africa. The park is home to a number of bird species including the Egyptian goose.

Sports fields can be found at the entrance of the park, which are made use of by Virginia United Football Club.
