= Alfred Park Nature Reserve =

Nature reserve in South Africa

- Location within KwaZulu-Natal
- Location: New Germany, South Africa
- Coordinates: 29°47′17″S 30°52′24″E
- Area: 8.4 ha (21 acres)
- Governing body: eThekwini Metropolitan Municipality

Alfred Park is a small (8.4 ha) wetland swamp forest in New Germany, KwaZulu-Natal, South Africa. It is managed by the Ethekwini Municipality.

The park is noted for its frog population, including reed frogs, various tree frogs, and the rare argus reed frog. There are picnic areas and self-guided trails in the park.

The park is currently under threat from alien invasive species, especially the Pickerel weed, which has impacted the frog population.
