= Palmiet, Durban =

Palmiet
- Location within KwaZulu-Natal Location within South Africa
- Coordinates: 29.8159°S 30.9669°E
- Country: South Africa
- Province: KwaZulu-Natal
- Municipality: eThekwini

Area
  - Total: 3.13 km^{2} (1.21 sq mi)

Population (2011)
  - Total: 9,782
  - Density: 3,130/km^{2} (8,090/sq mi)

Racial makeup (2011)
  - Black African: 53.5%
  - Coloured: 3.1%
  - Indian/Asian: 42.1%
  - White: 0.5%
  - Other: 0.8%

First languages (2011)
  - English: 47.6%
  - Zulu: 25.8%
  - Xhosa: 16.0%
  - Other: 10.6%
- Time zone: UTC+2 (SAST)
- Postal code (street): 4001

Palmiet is a residential area in the north of Durban, KwaZulu-Natal, South Africa.
