= Palmiet Nature Reserve =

- Location within KwaZulu-Natal
- Location: Westville, KwaZulu-Natal, South Africa
- Coordinates: 29°49′14″S 30°55′53″E
- Area: 90 ha (220 acres)
- Established: 1972
- Governing body: Ethekwini Metropolitan Municipality
- Website: https://palmiet.durban/

Palmiet Nature Reserve is located in Westville, a town located ten kilometres from Durban, South Africa. The reserve is made up of a wide variety of natural habitats ranging from forests to grassland. Hundreds of bird species have been recorded and the tree list is extensive. There are a number of self-guided trails that include river crossings. The diversity seen in the Palmiet Nature Reserve has been extensively threatened by human activity and invasive species, leading to the need for more pronounced guidelines on how to protect and reserve the area.

Igwalagwala Cliff, found in the reserve, is a site of archaeological significance as it has evidence of prehistoric human habitation.

== Geography ==
Palmiet Nature Reserve spans across 90 hectares (220 acres) of land, containing over 10 km of trails for tourists to explore. The reserve is located just 10 km from Durban, South Africa, which is the third most populous city in South Africa as well as in close proximity to the Indian Ocean.

The reserve has an annual high temperature of about 29 °C (84 °F) and an annual low temperature of about 11 °C (52 °F). Annual precipitation reaches a high of 4.3 inches and a low of 0.7 inches. The precipitation and temperature remains consistently high except for the months of May to August, where it is seen that both drop.

The Palmiet River is 26 km long, with only 6 km cutting through the Palmiet Nature Reserve. Due to its close proximity to Durban, the Palmiet River has been increasingly affected and prone to flooding due to human activity. The creation of roads and shopping centres has led to increased drainage into the river, and therefore more flooding in the reserve.

The area is presumed to have been formed over thousands of years of erosion and development. The granite-like rocks seen all over the reserve are the creation of magma that rose to the surface in prehistoric times, forming these layers of rocks from sediment already deposited in the area. The reserve is in close proximity to the coast and the Indian Ocean, which has seen rising sea levels over the years. The Palmiet River in the reserve has cut into the plains as a result of rising sea levels and is seen this way today.

== History ==
The Palmiet Nature Reserve has a history dating back to its formation during prehistoric time, but a more recent history of about 200 years. The reserve was found to have a large amount of the plant Palmiet present in the area, which led to the name Palmiet Nature Reserve at its founding in September 1972. Recent archeological evidence of the area has found an abundance of iron tools and artefacts dating back about a thousand years, suggesting the inhabitance of those who lived during the Stone Age. The first German families who migrated to the area were very familiar with the Palmiet Valley, using this path to travel to church or visit other German settlers nearby. The use of this path in turn became the starting point of the trail that leads into the nature reserve of Palmiet Valley. The reserve itself is now home to a diverse number of wildlife species and habitats, including but not limited to hundreds of bird species, hundreds of tree species, as well as an abundance of reptiles and mammals. The preservation and care-taking of the reserve is extremely important to maintain the biodiversity seen in this area.

== Species Interactions ==
The Palmiet Nature Reserve is home to thousands of different species, which promotes an abundance of species interactions such as predation and competition. Snakes are commonly seen in the nature reserve, and have been observed as the main predator in the region with species including the common or rhombic night adder. The snakes exert a level of control over the populations of small mammals, frogs, birds, and other reptiles as well by using them all as a food source. Water monitors, which are aquatic lizards, also exert control over all neighbouring species besides snakes. They use small mammals, birds, other reptiles, invertebrates and more as a food source. Competition is seen for resources among the species, specifically interactions seen between differing bird species for fish in the river.

== Environmental Concerns ==
Human activities have caused reason for concern over the maintenance of biodiversity in the nature reserve. The mammals specifically seen in the region have been largely affected by human involvement and activities in the area. Years ago, humans were prone to poaching and developing urban structures in the area, which ultimately led to massive habitat destruction and the direct killing of mammals in the reserve. Recently, the area has been officially proclaimed as a reserve which has provided extra levels of protection for the survival of species including the cape clawless otter, water mongoose, and the vervet monkeys. Limiting or decreasing the biodiversity of Palmiet would lead to the dysfunctioning of the ecosystems seen in the area, so establishing the Palmiet Nature Reserve has a huge impact on preserving the wildlife and diversity.

Even following the establishment of Palmiet Valley as a nature reserve, human activities have continued to negatively affect the region. The reserve has more recently become home to a diverse number of invasive species, brought by human involvement in harvesting and farming as well as inside packing material from the Second World War. These invasive species include Chromolaena odorata, which is the biggest threat to native wildlife of the region, Lantana camara, Bugweed and Syringa. These species have the ability to massively and quickly spread their seeds and overpopulate the areas, posing a massive threat to the ecosystems of the reserve. Visitors and employees are informed to attempt to kill these species upon sight of them.
