= Clive Cheesman Nature Reserve =

Protected area in Durban, South Africa

- Location within KwaZulu-Natal
- Location: Durban, South Africa
- Coordinates: 29°48′03″S 30°50′12″E
- Area: 5 ha (12 acres)
- Governing body: WESSA

The Clive Cheesman Nature Reserve is a protected area of riverine forest and grassland in the suburb of Kloof, Durban, South Africa.
