= Avoca, Durban =

Avoca
- Location within KwaZulu-Natal Location within South Africa
- Coordinates: 29.7678°S 31.0195°E
- Country: South Africa
- Province: KwaZulu-Natal
- Municipality: eThekwini
- Main Place: Durban

Area
  - Total: 2.53 km^{2} (0.98 sq mi)

Population (2011)
  - Total: 7,568
  - Density: 2,990/km^{2} (7,750/sq mi)

Racial makeup (2011)
  - Black African: 30.0%
  - Coloured: 4.7%
  - Indian/Asian: 63.2%
  - White: 0.3%
  - Other: 1.8%

First languages (2011)
  - Zulu: 16.6%
  - English: 70.9%
  - Xhosa: 4.8%
  - Afrikaans: 1.2%
  - Other: 6.5%
- Time zone: UTC+2 (SAST)
- Postal code (street): 4001
- Area code: 031

Avoca is a northern suburb of Durban, KwaZulu-Natal, South Africa. It is administered by the eThekwini Metropolitan Municipality and its postal code is 4001.

== Geography ==
Forming part of the easternmost area of Durban North, Avoca is situated approximately 13 kilometres north of the Durban CBD. It is bordered by Red Hill to the east, Park Hill to the south-east, Kenville and Greenwood Park to the south and Newlands East to the west and north.

== Transport ==
Avoca lies between the N2 which runs NE/SW and the R102 which runs NW/S. The N2 (Outer Ring Road) connects KwaDukuza to the north with Port Shepstone to the south, providing access to Avoca via the R102 at the exit 144 interchange. The R102 (Chris Hani Road) connects Phoenix to the north and Inanda to the north-west (via the M25) with the Durban city centre to the south.
