= Beachwood Mangroves Nature Reserve =

Nature reserve at the Umgeni River mouth, north of Durban, South Africa

Beachwood Mangrove Nature Reserve
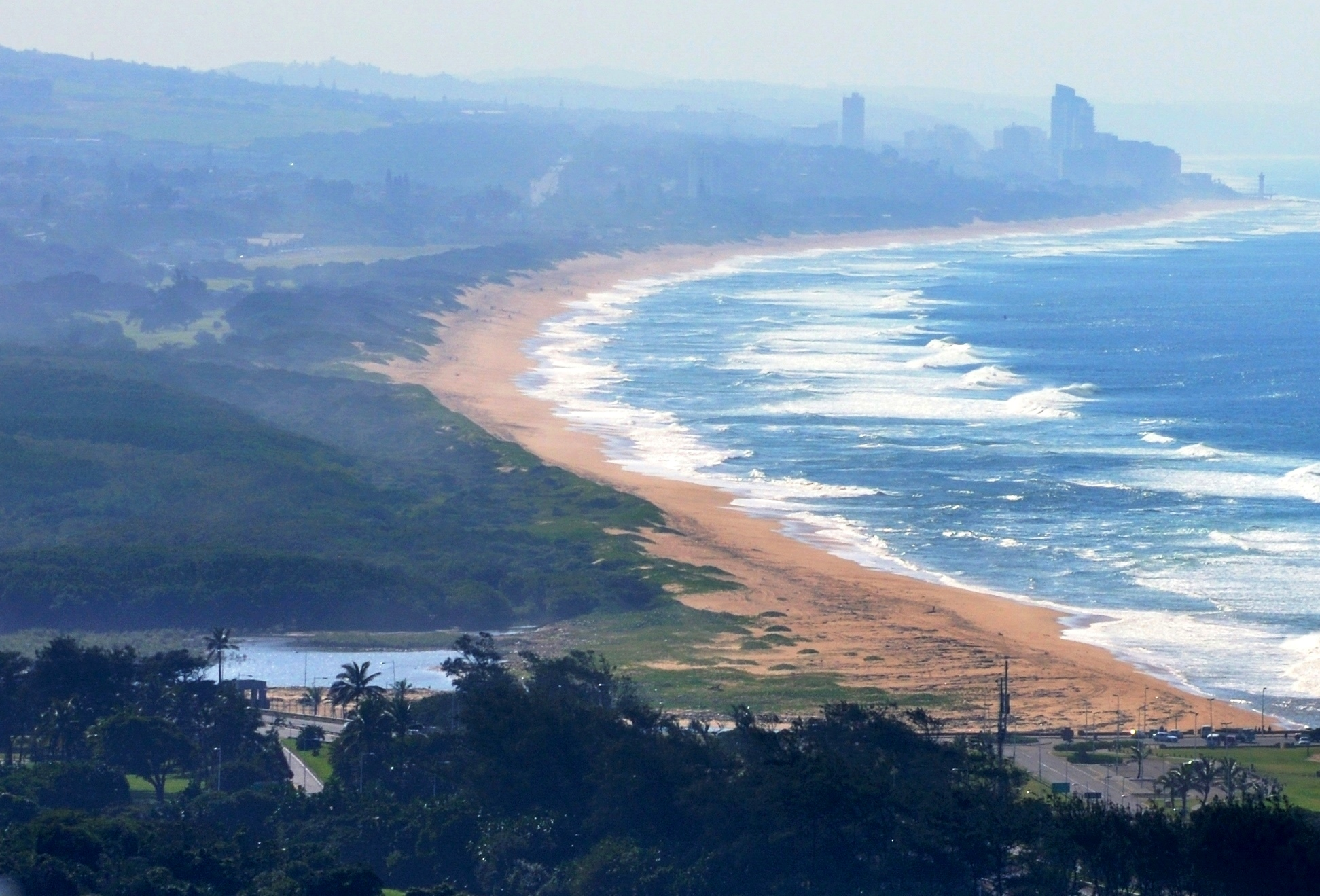
- View from the south

- Location within KwaZulu-Natal
- Location: Durban, South Africa
- Coordinates: 29.806404°S 31.037402°E
- Area: 76 ha (190 acres)
- Established: 1977
- Governing body: Ezemvelo KZN Wildlife

Beachwood Mangroves Nature Reserve is located at the mouth of the Umgeni River in Durban North, a suburb of Durban, South Africa. The nature reserve, proclaimed in 1977, protects 76 hectares of a natural estuarine system, and was declared a national monument in 1980.

== Flora and fauna ==
Three species of protected mangrove trees are found in the reserve: black, red, and white. The reserve is home to a number of animal species, including mudskippers, fiddler crabs and the mangrove kingfisher.

== Facilities ==
The area is used as a nature conservation education centre and has an activities centre available for educational groups. An elevated boardwalk throughout the reserve allows visitors to walk through the swamps at high tide along three trails. The reserve also provides a bird hide for the use of birdwatchers.
