= Pigeon Valley =

Nature reserve in Durban, South Africa

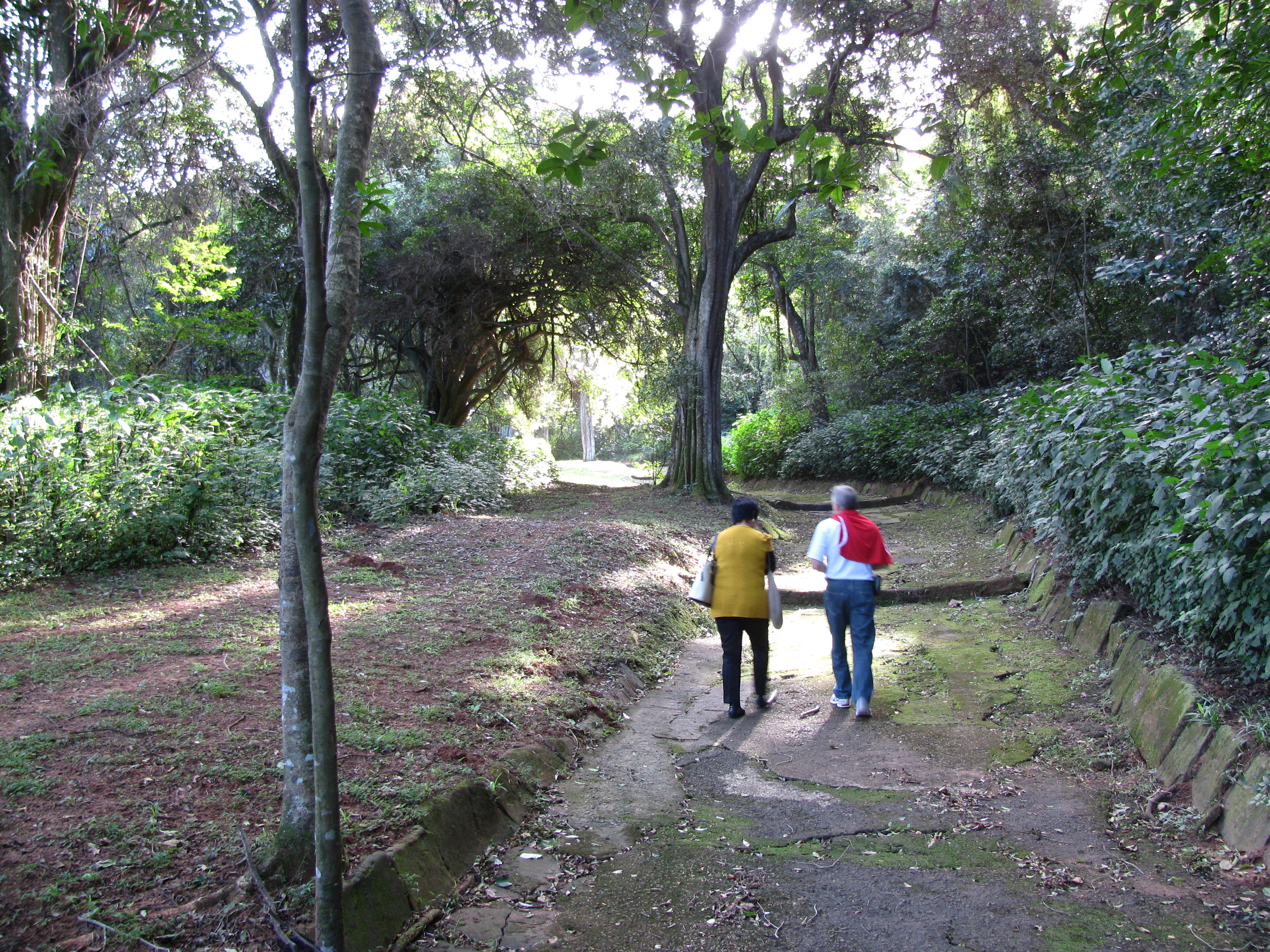
Hikers in Pigeon Valley

Pigeon Valley is a Natural Heritage Park and formally declared municipal nature reserve in Durban, South Africa (29.8646° S, 30.9869° E). It is an unusual example of an urban reserve with very high levels of biodiversity. It was established to provide protection for the Natal elm (Celtis mildbraedii) and other forest giants of the coastal climax forest. Another rare tree that occurs here is Natal forest loquat (Oxyanthus pyriformis), which is endemic to the Durban area and to oNgoye Forest.

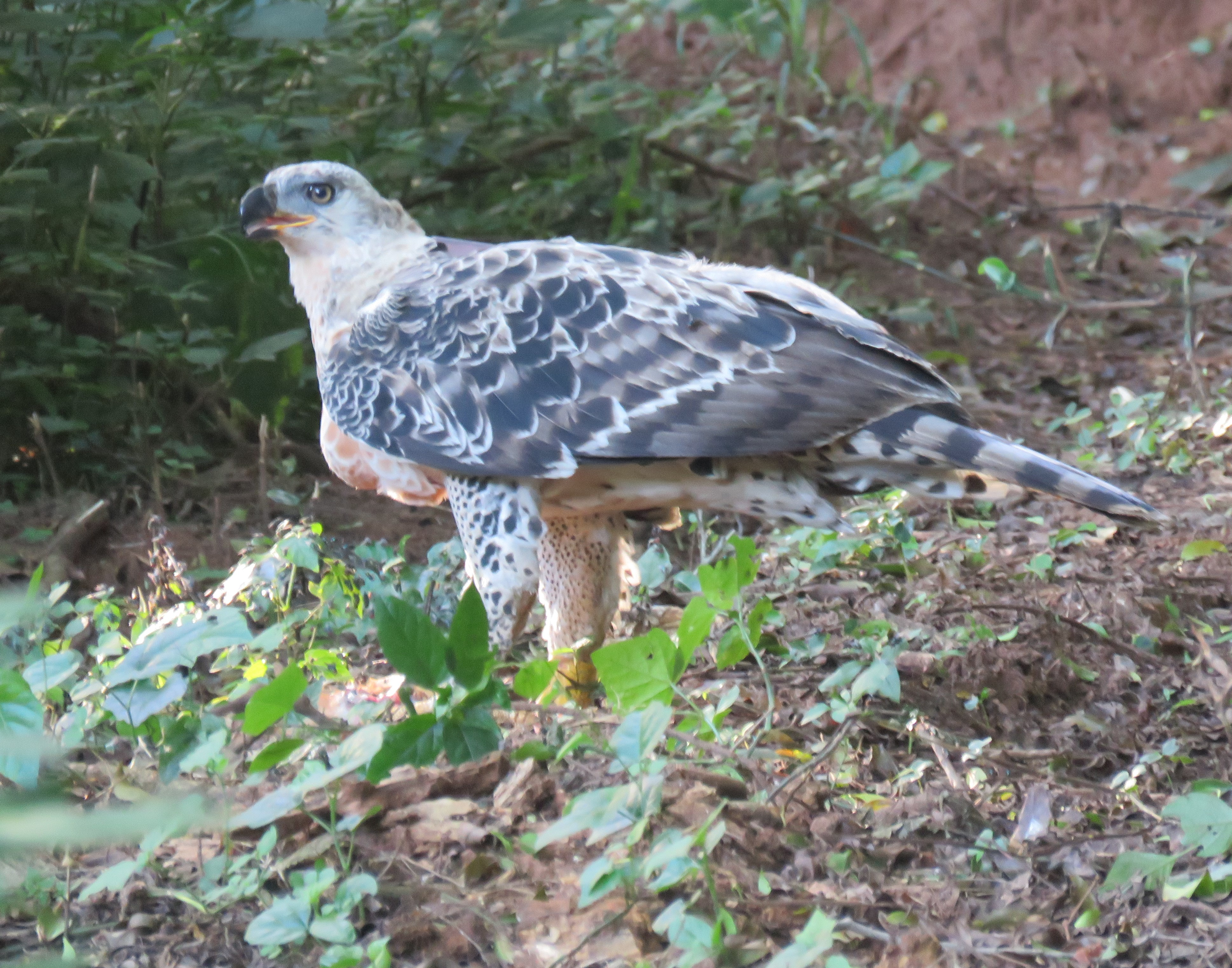
In March 2020, a juvenile Crowned Eagle stands over its prey, a Red Duiker

Pigeon Valley is about 11 ha in extent, and is situated on the Berea, overlooking Durban Bay. Its unusual north-south orientation may contribute to the biodiversity, with the south-facing slope covered in canopy forest, while the north-facing slope has thorny thickets. An adjoining reservoir, previously part of the reserve, provides a patch of coastal grassland.

== Animals ==
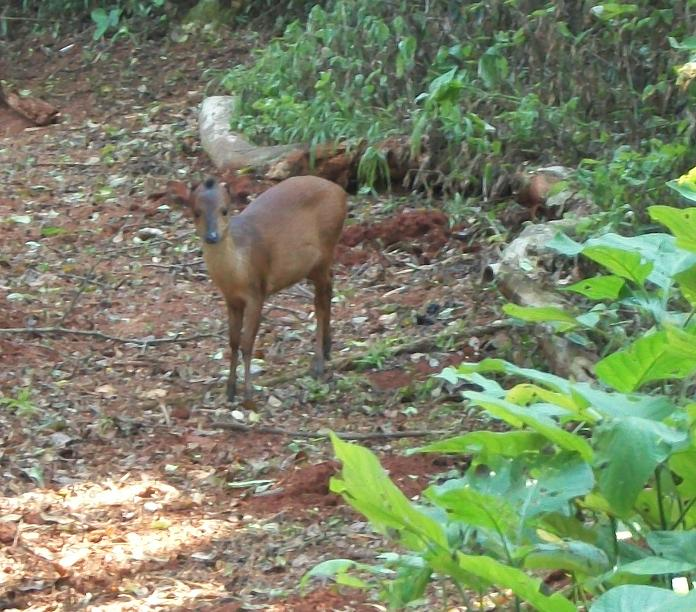
Red duiker at Pigeon Valley

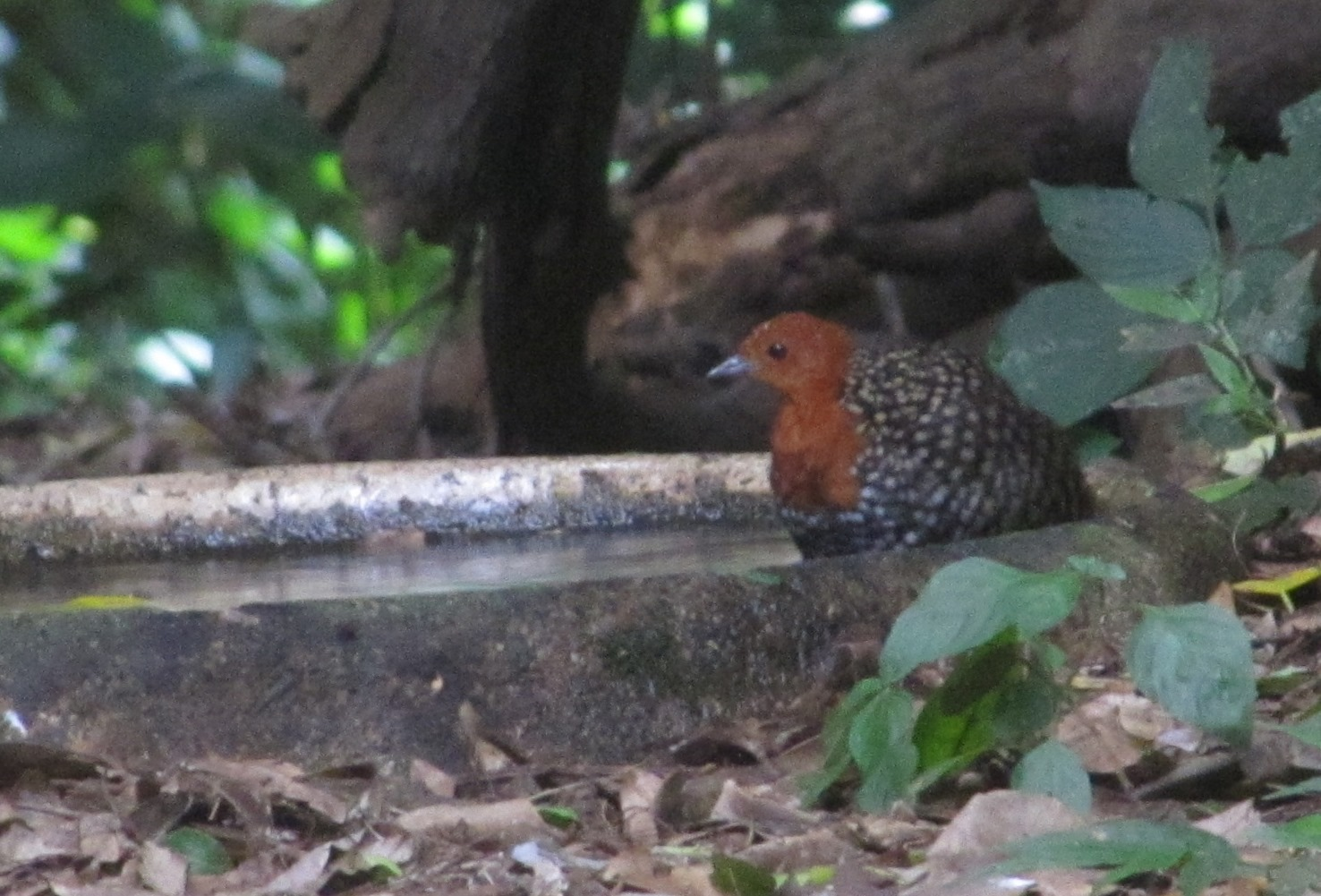
Male buff-spotted flufftail in Pigeon Valley, January 2014

The park is home to red duiker and blue duiker. Other mammals include Cape genet, a troop of banded mongooses as well as slender and water mongooses. Blue vervet monkeys are constantly present. In July 2019, a side-striped jackal was seen in neighbouring roads and was apparently living in the reserve for a time. This may be the southernmost sighting of this species.

The reserve was named after the Eastern Bronze-naped Pigeon, which is now locally extinct. Various species of forest birds are found here including; red-capped robin-chat, green twinspot, Cape white-eye, southern boubou, spotted ground thrush, purple-crested turaco and African paradise flycatcher. The black sparrowhawk breeds here annually. There are increasingly common visits by the Crowned eagle, and it seems that two birds are now resident in the suburban area. Another bird that is seldom seen but that is generally present is buff-spotted flufftail. Unusual sightings of note in recent years include European nightjar, Knysna warbler, lemon dove, mountain wagtail, black-throated wattle-eye, common scimitarbill, palm-nut vulture and Knysna turaco. The current bird list for Pigeon Valley includes 162 species. Now (Nov 2023) 167 species recorded out of 879 recorded by BLSA (List of birds of South Africa).

The Spotted ground thrush is of particular note, as Pigeon Valley is one of the places where this endangered bird can be most reliably found in winter. It arrives typically in late March or early April, and is present until August or September; earliest arrival date recorded has been 22 March and latest (in 2015) 5 October, apart from a single January sighting. Summer migrants include, occasionally, black cuckoo, red-chested cuckoo and red-backed shrike.

=== Bird list ===
Bird list for Pigeon Valley
| Family | Species | Status | Notes |
|---|---|---|---|
| Apalis | Bar-throated | Breeding resident | |
| Apalis | Yellow-breasted | Breeding resident | |
| Barbet | Acacia Pied | Rare visitor | July 2021 |
| Barbet | Black-collared | Breeding resident | Recent decline in numbers |
| Barbet | Crested | Occasional visitor | |
| Barbet | White-eared | Breeding resident | Increasing in number |
| Batis | Cape | Breeding resident | |
| Batis | Chinspot | Occasional visitor | |
| Bee-eater | Little | Occasional visitor | |
| Blackcap | Black | Rare visitor | 22 August 2020 |
| Boubou | Southern | Breeding resident | |
| Brownbul | Terrestrial | Breeding resident | |
| Bulbul | Dark-capped | Breeding resident | |
| Bunting | Golden-breasted | Occasional visitor | April 1992, 30 March 2013 |
| Bush shrike | Gorgeous | Rare visitor | 2007 |
| Bush shrike | Grey-headed | Occasional visitor | 2012; 2014, 2019-2020, possibly breeding summer 2024-5 |
| Bush shrike | Olive | Winter and spring visitor | |
| Bush shrike | Orange-breasted | Occasional visitor | 2011; 2024-5 |
| Buzzard | Steppe | Infrequent visitor | March 2019 |
| Camaroptera | Green-backed | Breeding resident | |
| Canary | Brimstone | Regular visitor | |
| Canary | Yellow-fronted | Regularly present | |
| Chat | Familiar | Occasional visitor | |
| Cisticola | Zitting | Rare visitor | Pair present 2015; 2020 |
| Coucal | Burchell's | Breeding resident | Breeding since 2021 |
| Crested Flycatcher | Blue-mantled | Rare visitor | Female present 2014-6 |
| Crow | Pied | Occasional visitor | |
| Cuckoo-Hawk | African | Rare visitor | Present June 2014 |
| Cuckoo | Black | Occasional summer visitor | |
| Cuckoo | Common | Rare visitor | 1979; November 2018 |
| Cuckoo | Diederik | Regular summer visitor | |
| Cuckoo | Emerald | Occasional summer visitor | |
| Cuckoo | Jacobin | Rare visitor | October 2016 |
| Cuckoo | Klaas's | Breeding resident | Breeding 2014 |
| Cuckoo | Red-chested | Occasional summer visitor | 2015, 2017 |
| Cuckooshrike | Black | Occasional visitor | Mainly winter |
| Cuckooshrike | Grey | Rare visitor | Mainly winter |
| Doves & pigeons | African green pigeon | Record from 1979 | |
| Doves & pigeons | Laughing dove | Breeding resident | |
| Doves & pigeons | Lemon dove | Rare visitor | 2012, 2018 |
| Doves & pigeons | Red-eyed dove | Breeding resident | |
| Doves & pigeons | Rock dove | Occasional visitor | |
| Doves & pigeons | Tambourine dove | Breeding resident | |
| Drongo | Fork-tailed | Breeding resident | |
| Drongo | Square-tailed | Breeding resident | |
| Duck | White-faced whistling | Infrequent visitor | November 2017 |
| Eagle | African crowned | Occasional visitor | |
| Eagle-owl | Spotted | Occasional visitor | |
| Falcon | Lanner | Occasional visitor | |
| Firefinch | African | Breeding resident | |
| Firefinch | Red-billed | Breeding resident | First sighting January 2015; now established |
| Fiscal | Common | Not seen in recent years | |
| Flufftail | Buff-spotted | Breeding resident | Seen regularly |
| Flycatcher | Ashy | Breeding resident | |
| Flycatcher | Dusky | Breeding resident | |
| Flycatcher | Fiscal | Regular winter visitor | |
| Flycatcher | Southern Black | Breeding resident | |
| Flycatcher | Spotted | Uncommon summer visitor | Present late 2014 |
| Goose | Egyptian | Breeding resident | |
| Goshawk | African | Breeding resident | |
| Greenbul | Sombre | Breeding resident | |
| Greenbul | Yellow-bellied | Breeding resident | Breeding since 2021 |
| Hamerkop | Hamerkop | Occasional visitor | |
| Harrier-Hawk | African | Regular visitor | |
| Heron | Black-headed | Occasional visitor | |
| Hobby | Eurasian | Rare visitor | March 2015 |
| Honey-Buzzard | European | Rare visitor | First sighting January 2015 |
| Honeybird | Brown-backed | Occasional visitor | |
| Honeyguide | Greater | Rare visitor | Not seen in recent years |
| Honeyguide | Lesser | Usually present | |
| Honeyguide | Scaly-throated | Occasional visitor | |
| Hoopoe | African | Occasional visitor | |
| Hornbill | Crowned | Rare visitor | 2015 |
| Hornbill | Trumpeter | Rare visitor | 2011 |
| Ibis | Hadeda | Breeding resident | |
| Indigobird | Village | Uncertain as yet | First sighted June 2019 |
| Kingfisher | African Pygmy | Occasional visitor | |
| Kingfisher | Brown-hooded | Breeding resident | |
| Kingfisher | Malachite | Dry season | Roberts VII |
| Kingfisher | Mangrove | Rare visitor | 2011, March 2016, 8 October 2017 |
| Kite | Yellow-billed | Breeding migrant | |
| Malkoha | Green | Infrequent visitor | 2010, 2017-8 |
| Mannikin | Bronze | Breeding resident | |
| Mannikin | Red-backed | Breeding resident | |
| Martin | Rock | Occasional visitor | |
| Mousebird | Red-faced | Breeding resident | |
| Mousebird | Speckled | Breeding resident | |
| Myna | Common | Frequent visitor | |
| Nightjar | European | Rare visitor | 2013; 18 December 2014 |
| Nightjar | Fiery-necked | Occasional visitor | |
| Oriole | Black-headed | Breeding resident | |
| Owl | Southern White-faced | Rare vagrant | July 2018 |
| Owl | Western Barn | Rare visitor | Record from 1979, April 2023 |
| Paradise flycatcher | African | | |
| Parakeet | Rose-ringed | Regular visitor | |
| Prinia | Tawny-flanked | Breeding resident | |
| Puffback | Black-backed | Breeding resident | |
| Quelea | Red-billed | Rare visitor | December 2017 |
| Robin | White-starred | Rare visitor | Juvenile 26 April 2026, first in recent years |
| Robin-Chat | Cape | Occasional visitor | Mainly winter |
| Robin-Chat | Chorister | Occasional visitor | Mainly winter |
| Robin-Chat | Red-capped | Breeding resident | |
| Saw-wing | Black | Regular visitor | |
| Scimitarbill | Common | Rare visitor | 11 November 2016 |
| Scrub Robin | White-browed | Formerly breeding resident | |
| Seedeater | Streaky-headed | Breeding resident | |
| Shrike | Red-backed | Infrequent summer visitor | Present Nov 2015 |
| Sparrow | House | Occasional visitor | |
| Sparrow | Southern grey-headed | Occasional visitor | |
| Sparrowhawk | Black | Breeding resident | |
| Sparrowhawk | Little | Occasional visitor | |
| Spurfowl | Natal | Breeding resident | |
| Starling | Black-bellied | Breeding resident | |
| Starling | Cape Glossy | Breeding resident | |
| Starling | Red-winged | Regularly present | |
| Starling | Violet-backed | Occasional summer visitor | |
| Stonechat | African | Rare visitor | Not seen in recent years |
| Stork | Woolly-necked | Occasional visitor | |
| Sunbird | Amethyst | Breeding resident | |
| Sunbird | Collared | Breeding resident | |
| Sunbird | Greater double-collared | Infrequent visitor | |
| Sunbird | Grey | Breeding resident | |
| Sunbird | Olive | Breeding resident | |
| Sunbird | Purple-banded | Regular visitor | Winter |
| Sunbird | White-bellied | Breeding resident | |
| Swallow | Barn | Regular visitor | Summer |
| Swallow | Lesser-striped | Regular visitor | |
| Swallow | White-throated | Occasional visitor | |
| Swift | African Palm | Regularly present | |
| Swift | Alpine | Rare visitor | Not seen in recent years |
| Swift | Black | Rare visitor | |
| Swift | Little | Regularly present | |
| Swift | White-rumped | Occasional visitor | |
| Tchagra | Southern | Rare visitor | 2017, 2018 |
| Thrush | Kurrichane | Breeding resident | |
| Thrush | Olive | Winter visitor | Present March 2014, 2018 |
| Thrush | Spotted Ground | Regular migrant | April to September; November 2014; January 2016 |
| Tinkerbird | Red-fronted | Occasional visitor | October 2017, July 2020 |
| Tinkerbird | Yellow-rumped | Breeding resident | |
| Tit | Southern black | Breeding resident | |
| Trogon | Narina | Occasional visitor | |
| Turaco | Knysna | Rare visitor | September 1991; 1 October 2017 |
| Turaco | Purple-crested | Breeding resident | |
| Twinspot | Green | Regular visitor | Breeding record 2014 |
| Vulture | Palm-nut | Rare visitor | 22 October 2017, May 2020 |
| Wagtail | Cape | Occasional visitor | |
| Wagtail | Mountain | Rare visitor | Seen once in 1990s, again in 2013 |
| Warbler | Barratt's | Infrequent winter visitor | June 2014, 2017 |
| Warbler | Garden | Rare visitor | Present winter 2015 |
| Warbler | Knysna | Rare visitor | 20 August 2017, 2018, 2025 |
| Warbler | Marsh | Summer visitor | Several 2017-9 |
| Warbler | Willow | Rare summer visitor | December 2014 |
| Warbler | Yellow-throated Woodland | Rare visitor, winter | 13 August 2016 |
| Wattle-eye | Black-throated | Rare visitor | 2013; present in 2015 |
| Waxbill | Common | Regular visitor | |
| Waxbill | Grey | Breeding resident | |
| Weaver | Cape | Breeding resident | |
| Weaver | Dark-backed | Breeding resident | |
| Weaver | Eastern Golden | Breeding | Rare visitor, then breeding from 2023 |
| Weaver | Spectacled | Regularly present | |
| Weaver | Thick-billed | Breeding resident | |
| Weaver | Village | Breeding resident | |
| White-eye | Cape | Breeding resident | |
| Wood-hoopoe | Green | Regular visitor | |
| Woodpecker | Cardinal | Breeding resident | |
| Woodpecker | Golden-tailed | Breeding resident | |
| Woodpecker | Olive | Rare visitor | 2009, 2017, 2018, 2019-2020 |
| Whydah | Pin-tailed | Irregular visitor | 2015, 2017 |

== Butterflies ==
The reserve is excellent for butterflies, and the total listing is now 95 species. In September 2018 the first pupae of the short-barred sapphire were found on a Celtis mildbraedii tree. The host plant is the Oncocalyx quinquenervius mistletoe, which grows profusely on the tree. Subsequently a red-line sapphire was found at the same spot. The first forest queen was found in 2019.

Butterflies of Pigeon Valley
| Family or subfamily | Common name | Scientific name |
|---|---|---|
| Monarch | African Monarch | Danaus chrysippus orientis |
| | Novice | Amauris ochlea ochlea |
| | Layman | Amauris albimaculata albimaculata |
| Browns | African Ringlet | Ypthima asterope |
| | Common Bush Brown | Bicyclus safitza safitza |
| | Squinting Bush Brown | Bicyclus anynana anynana |
| | Twilight Brown | Melanitis leda helena |
| Acraeas | Blood-red Acraea | Acraea petraea |
| | Common Wanderer | Acraea aganice aganice |
| | Dancing Acraea | Telchinia serena |
| | Dusky Acraea | Telchinia esebria esebria |
| | Dusky-veined Acraea | Telchinia igola |
| | Natal Acraea | Acraea natalica |
| | White-barred Acraea | Telchinia encedon encedon |
| | Window Acraea | Acraea oncaea |
| | Yellow-banded Acraea | Telchinia cabira |
| Leopards | Blotched Leopard | Lachnoptera ayresii |
| | Forest Leopard | Phalanta eurytis imitator |
| Emperors | Blue-spotted Emperor | Charaxes cithaeron cithaeron |
| | Forest Queen | Charaxes wakefieldi |
| | Green-veined Emperor | Charaxes candiope candiope |
| | Pearl Emperor | Charaxes varanes varanes |
| | Satyr Emperor | Charaxes ethalion ethalion |
| | Silver-barred Emperor | Charaxes druceanus druceanus |
| | White-barred Emperor | Charaxes brutus natalensis |
| Gliders/Sailers | Blonde Glider | Cymothoe coranus coranus |
| | Boisduval's False Acraea | Pseudacraea boisduvali trimeni |
| | Boisduval's Tree Nymph | Sevenia boisduvali |
| | False Chief | Pseudacraea lucretia tarquinia |
| | False Wanderer | Pseudacrea eurytus imitator |
| | Golden Piper | Eurytela dryope angulata |
| | Natal Tree Nymph | Sevenia natalensis |
| | Pied Piper | Eurytela hiarbas angustata |
| | Spotted Joker | Byblia ilithyia |
| | Spotted Sailer | Neptis saclava marpessa |
| Diadems/Pansies | Blue Pansy | Junonia oenone oenone |
| | Brown Pansy | Junonia natalica natalica |
| | Clouded Mother-of-pearl | Protogoniomorpha anacardii nebulosa |
| | Common Diadem | Hypolimnas misippus |
| | Common Mother-of-Pearl | Protogoniomorpha parhassus |
| | Eyed Pansy | Junonia orithya madagascariensis |
| | Garden Inspector | Precis archesia archesia |
| | Painted Lady | Vanessa cardui |
| | Soldier Pansy | Junonia terea elgiva |
| | Variable Diadem | Hypolimnas anthedon wahlbergi |
| Buff | Spotted Buff | Pentila tropicalis tropicalis |
| Sapphires | Red-line Sapphire | Iolaus sidus |
| | Short-barred Sapphire | Iolaus aemulus |
| | Southern Sapphire | Iolaus silas |
| Blues | African Grass Blue | Zizeeria knysna |
| | Apricot Playboy | Deudorix dinochare |
| | Barker's Smoky Blue | Euchrysops barkeri |
| | Black Pie | Tuxentius melaena melaena |
| | Brown Playboy | Deudorix antalus |
| | Bush Bronze | Cacyreus lingeus |
| | Common Black-eye | Leptomyrina gorgias gorgias |
| | Common Blue group | Leptotes sp. |
| | Gaika Blue | Zizula hylax |
| | Geranium Bronze | Cacyreus marshalli |
| | Grass Jewel | Chilades trochylus |
| | Long-tailed Blue | Lampides boeticus |
| | Osiris Smoky Blue | Euchrysops osiris |
| | Purple-brown Hairstreak | Hypolycaena philippus philippus |
| | Rayed Blue | Actizera lucida |
| | Scarce Fig-tree Blue | Myrina dermaptera dermaptera |
| | Thorn-tree Blue | Azanus moriqua |
| | Twin-spot Blue | Lepidochrysops plebeia |
| Vagrants | Autumn-leaf Vagrant | Afrodryas leda |
| | Buquet's Vagrant/Green-eyed Monster | Nepheronia buquetii |
| | Vine-leaf Vagrant | Eronia cleodora |
| Tips | Coast Purple Tip | Colotis erone |
| | Smoky Orange Tip | Colotis euippe omphale |
| Whites | African Common White | Belenois creona severina |
| | African Migrant | Catopsilia florella |
| | African Wood White | Leptosia alcesta inalcesta |
| | Angled Grass Yellow | Eurema desjardinsii marshalli |
| | Ant-heap Small White | Dixeia pigea |
| | Broad-bordered Grass Yellow | Eurema brigitta brigitta |
| | Brown-veined White | Belenois aurota aurota |
| | Common Dotted Border | Mylothris agathina |
| | Common Grass Yellow | Eurema hecabe senegalensis |
| | Diverse White | Appias epaphia contracta |
| | False Dotted Border | Belenois thysa thysa |
| | Twin Dotted Border | Mylothris rueppellii haemus |
| Swallowtails | Citrus Swallowtail | Papilio demodocus demodocus |
| | Green-banded Swallowtail | Papilio nireus lyaeus |
| | Mocker Swallowtail | Papilio dardanus cenea |
| Skippers | Buff-tipped | Natrobalane canopus |
| | Clouded Flat | Tagiades flesus |
| | Common Hottentot Skipper | Gegenes niso niso |
| Elfins | Small Elfin | Sarangesa phidyle |
| Sylphs | Gold Spotted Sylph | Metisella metis paris |
| Darts | Macken's Dart | Acleros mackenii |
| Swifts | Long-horned Swift | Borbo fatuellus fatuellus |

== Plants ==
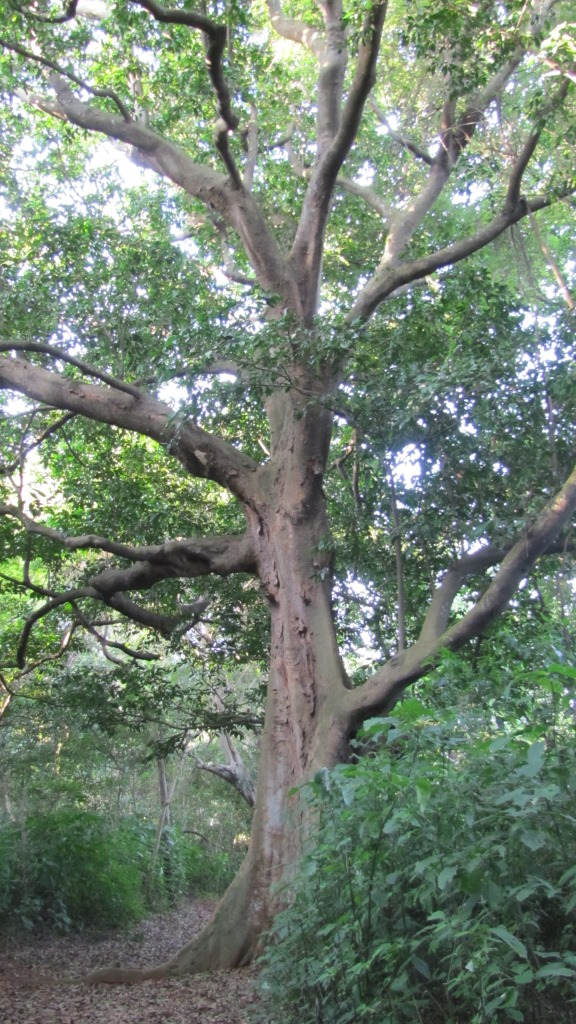
A Natal elm, showing its extensive buttressing, Pigeon Valley, May 2013

There are over 110 species of trees occurring in Pigeon Valley, almost all of which are locally indigenous. Pigeon Valley is also notable for large stands of buckweed (Isoglossa woodii), which grow in more open areas under the forest canopy and in forest glades. In recent years there have been a few discoveries of plants not previously identified.

Pigeon Valley is unique in having large numbers of the rare Natal elm, and of Natal forest loquat. A Cryptocarya specimen found adjacent to the main track has so far not been definitively identified; it may be a species seldom found in the area (C. liebertiana) or alternatively a hybrid (C. latifolia and C. woodii). Other uncommon flora include the little-known creepers Telosma africana and Vincetoxicum anomalum.

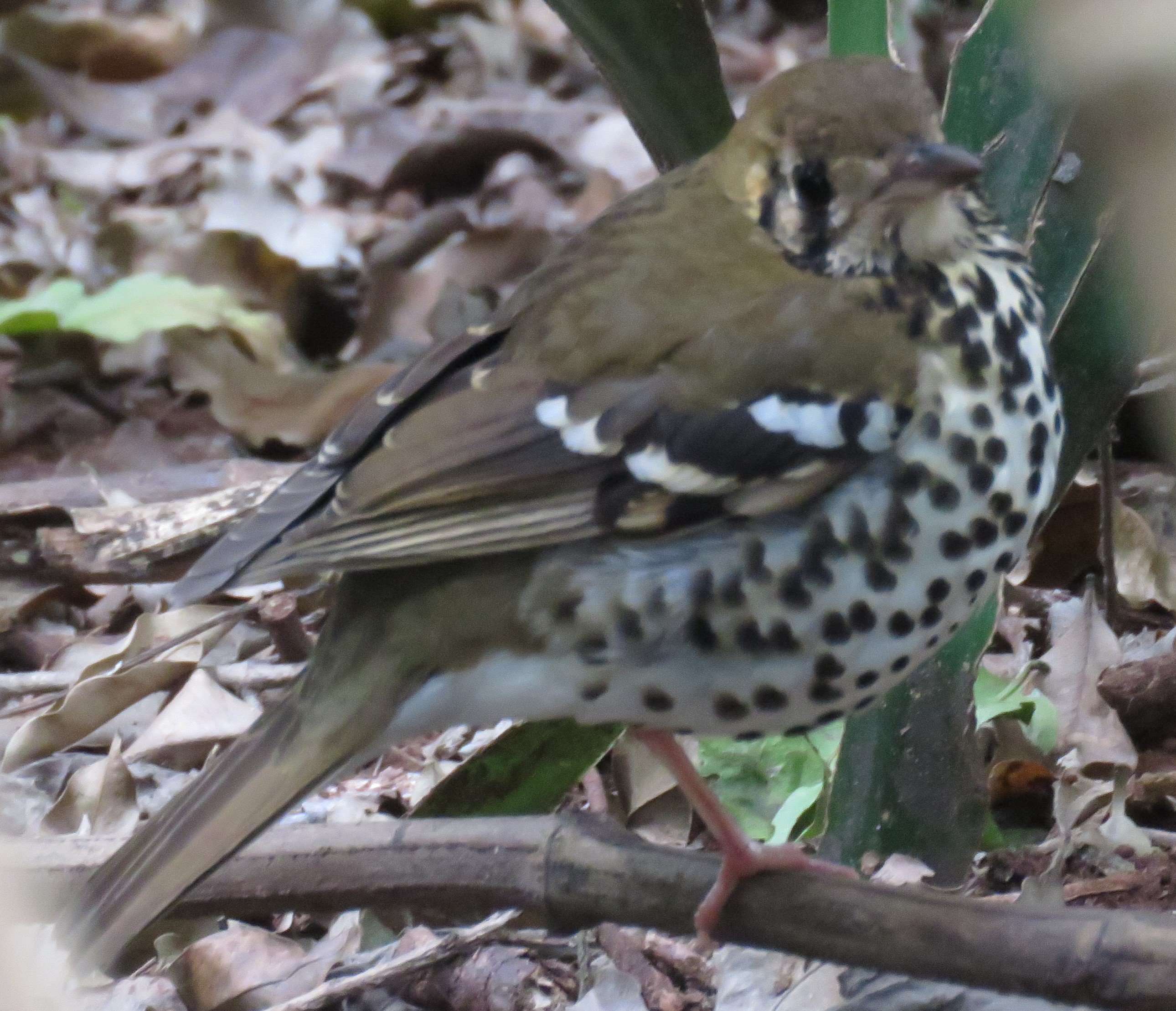
A spotted ground thrush in this urban reserve, where it is a winter visitor

== Public access ==
The reserve is open from 07:30 to 16:00 daily throughout the year. The entrance is in Princess Alice Avenue, Glenwood, opposite Rhodes Avenue.

== Community ==
An active grouping, Friends of Pigeon Valley, undertakes clearing of invasive alien plants, ensuring that the park is unusually free of alien species. It also liaises with management to ensure the biodiversity of the reserve and the wellbeing of visitors. It also liaises with the municipal managers of the reserve to address relevant issues. The Friends operate a monthly walk open to the public on the second Saturday of each month, at 07h30. There is a Facebook page, Friends of Pigeon Valley, at https://www.facebook.com/FriendsOfPigeonValley/.

== See also ==
- Forests of KwaZulu-Natal

== Bibliography ==
- Pooley, T. and Player, I. (1995). KwaZulu-Natal Wildlife Destinations. ISBN 1-86812-487-8.
