= Seaton Park Nature Reserve =

Conservation area in Durban, South Africa

- Location within KwaZulu-Natal
- Location: Durban, South Africa
- Coordinates: 29°47′23″S 31°01′21″E
- Area: 6 ha (15 acres)
- Governing body: D'MOSS

Seaton Park Nature Reserve is conservation area in the suburb of Durban North, Durban, South Africa. The reserve is a six hectare remnant of coastal forest, with trails throughout. The park is named after a Mrs Seaton, who bequeathed the land for the park.

== Flora and fauna ==
The park is on the lower eastern slope of a steep valley protected from coastal wind. The park consists mostly of coastal lowland forest. Natal loquat, forest ironplum and real yellowwood trees are found in the reserve.
