= Westville, KwaZulu-Natal =

Westville
- Town
- Location within KwaZulu-Natal Location within South Africa
- Coordinates: 29.831°S 30.925°E
- Country: South Africa
- Province: KwaZulu-Natal
- Municipality: eThekwini

Area
  - Total: 30.76 km^{2} (11.88 sq mi)

Population (2011)
  - Total: 30,508
  - Density: 991.8/km^{2} (2,569/sq mi)

Racial makeup (2011)
  - Black African: 32.5%
  - Coloured: 2.6%
  - Indian/Asian: 22.1%
  - White: 42.0%
  - Other: 0.7%

First languages (2011)
  - English: 72.2%
  - Zulu: 17.3%
  - Afrikaans: 5.4%
  - Xhosa: 1.9%
  - Other: 3.2%
- Time zone: UTC+2 (SAST)
- Postal code (street): 3629
- PO box: 3630

Westville is an area in KwaZulu-Natal, South Africa, and is just west and 10 km inland from the Durban CBD. It was formerly an independent municipality and became part of the eThekwini Metropolitan Municipality in 2002.

The climate is subtropical; Westville experiences mild, dry winters, and hot, humid summers with frequent late afternoon downpours.

== History ==
The settlement began in 1847 as the farm "Westville" (named in honour of Martin West, the first British lieutenant-governor of what was then the province of Natal). In March 1848 a group of Germans, brought out by Jonas Bergtheil, arrived in Port Natal to settle the area and farm cotton. They established several farms both in Westville and neighbouring New Germany (the two settlements are separated by the Palmiet Valley), and were a tight-knit community. The Westville settlers would travel through Palmiet Valley on Sundays to attend the Lutheran Church in New Germany. When their cotton crops failed the first year, settlers were granted permission to farm other crops like potatoes, mielies (corn), barley and oats. The city of Durban provided a ready market for their produce.

The 'German House' owned by the Lange family on what is today Jan Hofmeyr Road became an important stopover for those travelling the Old Main Road between Durban and Pietermaritzburg. The Outspan Tree (derived from the Afrikaans uitspan: out-span or to rest) alongside the hostelry is where travelers could rest is now a national monument. The Outspan Tree that stands there currently is a younger offspring of the original that was cut down in the early 1900's. The Bergtheil Museum, located on what is today 16 Queen's Avenue, was built in the 1840s and is the oldest remaining house in Westville. It offers visitors an idea of early settler dwellings and farming practices.

The 1850s saw the addition of Scottish and English settlers to Westville. In the 1870s, Indian market gardeners moved into the area too. In time, the German settlers integrated with other settlers and began to speak English.

Westville was proclaimed a borough in 1956. It was incorporated into the eThekwini Metropolitan Municipality, along with Durban and various surrounding towns, suburbs and villages as part of the post-apartheid re-organisation of South Africa's municipalities.

== Geography ==
Westville is situated approximately between 107m (351ft) and 300m (984ft) above sea level in the hills above Durban and roughly extends between the Palmiet River to the north and the uMbilo River to the south. Its surrounding suburbs include Queensburgh to the south, Clermont to the north-west, Pinetown to the west, Reservoir Hills to the north (part of Durban) and Sherwood to the east (part of Durban). It is also centrally located to a few surrounding townships, namely Cato Manor, Clermont and Chesterville.

=== Suburban areas ===
The 2011 census divided the main place of Westville into seven “sub places” including:

- Atholl Heights
- Berea West (the suffix "West" was added to the suburb to differentiate from the suburb of Berea in Durban approximately 6 km to the west)
- Chiltern Hills
- Dawncliffe
- Dawncrest
- Grayleigh
- Westville (Proper)

The northern suburbs of Atholl Heights, Chiltern Hills, Dawncrest, Grayleigh are collectively known as "Westville North".

== Education ==
Schools situated in Westville include Star College Durban Westville Boys' High School, Westville Girls' High School, Atholl Heights Primary School, Berea West Junior Primary School, Berea West Senior Primary School, Pitlochry Primary School, Westville Senior Primary and the Deutsche Schule Durban. Higher education centres include a 2-square-kilometre campus of University of KwaZulu-Natal (formerly the University of Durban-Westville) and Varsity College (Westville campus).

Specialist schools such as The International Hotel School, based at the Westville Hotel, and The Fusion Cooking School can also be found in Westville.

== Religions ==
There are several churches in Westville, including the Westville Methodist Church on 38 Jan Hofmeyr Road, Our Lady of Lourdes Catholic Church on 14 Westville Road, the Westville Baptist Church on 2 Church Place, St Elizabeth's Anglican Church on 45 Salisbury Avenue, and OneCity Church, which meets at the Westville Country Club. Mosques in Westville include Habibia Soofie Masjid, a Soofie mosque, on 119 Jan Hofmeyr Road, the Westville Jaame Musjid on 46 Meerut Road, as well as Masjid Muadh Bin Jabal on 56 Rockdale Avneue, Berea West. There are also a few other musallas located within the suburb.

== Economy ==
=== Offices ===
Westville boasts multiple business parks, including West Way Office Park and Essex Gardens in the south, with others spread across the CBD and the eastern part of the town. These business parks house a mix of small businesses and major corporations, notably the headquarters for RCL Foods, Boxer Superstores, The Unlimited, Vector Logistics, and regional offices for Eskom.

=== Retail ===
Westville is primarily a residential area, featuring several shopping centres throughout the suburb, such as The Pavilion Mall—the second largest in the Greater Durban metropolitan area—along with Westwood Mall, Westville Mall, and Westville Junction.

== Attractions ==
Tourist attractions include Palmiet Nature Reserve, which has 15 kilometres of guided and self-guided trails. Further afield tourists can experience the evergreen Western Inland Route and Natal's regional attractions, including the Drakensberg (Barrier of Spears) Battlefields Tours, game reserves and Zululand. A large Anglo-German Historical Route exists with numerous churches, museums and grave sites depicting the early settlement struggles of the early colonial days.

== Infrastructure ==
=== Healthcare ===
Life Westville Hospital, a private facility owned by Life Healthcare Group, serves the residents of Westville from its location south of the N3, adjacent to The Pavilion Shopping Centre.

=== Policing ===
Most of Westville is covered by the policing precinct of Westville SAPS (located 2 km north-east of the CBD). However, a small section on the eastern border of Westville including Westwood Mall, Westwood Estate, Westwood Lodge and Forest Office Park is covered by Sydenham SAPS (located in neighbouring Sherwood).

=== Prison ===
Westville Prison, which sits on the edge of Westville, is one of the largest prisons in the country and the only prison located in the Greater Durban area.

=== Transport ===
==== Roads ====
Westville is intersected by four freeway systems, namely; to the east, the N2 (Outer Ring Road) runs northerly from Port Shepstone to KwaDukuza and King Shaka International Airport; to the south, the N3 (Western Freeway) runs northwesterly from Durban to Pietermaritzburg; to the centre, the M13 (King Cetshwayo Highway) runs northwesterly from Durban to Hillcrest via Pinetown; and to the north, the M19 runs westerly from Durban to Pinetown.

The interchange between the N2 and N3, the E.B. Cloete Interchange, also colloquially known as “Spaghetti Junction” is a notable landmark in Westville.

The M32 is the main thoroughfare through the suburbs of Westville, formed by Harry Gwala Road, St James Avenue, Attercliffe Road, Jan Hofmeyr Road and Rodger Sishi Road. It connects Westville to Chesterville (Durban) in the south and New Germany (Pinetown) in the north-west.
