= Westville Prison =

Prison in South Africa

Coordinates: 29.86°S 30.91°E

Westville Prison is located on the outskirts of Westville (eThekwini Metropolitan Municipality), a town inland of Durban. It is one of the largest prisons in South Africa and the only prison located in the Durban area. As of 2005, there were 40,000 inmates at Westville Prison.

== Location ==
The prison is located on the southern edge of Westville, in the suburb of Dawncliffe. The entrance to the complex is on Harry Gwala Road. Between the prison and Westville proper is the complex housing the prison's wardens and other staff. Roosfontein Nature Reserve acts as a buffer area surrounding the rest of the prison.

== Escapes ==
There have been a number of escapes or attempted escapes from Westville Prison, most notably by:

- Thozamile Taki, the "sugarcane serial killer" and eight others. They were awaiting trial when they broke out of their cell at the Medium "A" section of the prison on 21 February 2010 by sawing through a steel door and the grill gates. By 7 March 2010, three of these escapees, including Taki, had been caught, with one being killed by the police.

== Suicides ==
- João Rendeiro, Portuguese fugitive banker who had been sentenced to 10 years in jail in his home country for tax evasion, fraud and money laundering.
