= WESSA =

Wildlife organisation in South Africa

- Wildlife and Environment Society of South Africa
- Formation: 1926; 100 years ago
- Headquarters: 1 Karkloof Rd, Howick, South Africa,
- Budget: R 923 534
- Revenue: R 30 705 718
- Expenses: R 33 026 426
- Website: wessa.org.za

The Wildlife and Environment Society of South Africa (WESSA; previously known as the Wildlife Society of Southern Africa and still earlier as Wild Life Protection and Conservation Society) is a non-government environmental organisation (NGO) of South Africa, established in 1926, although its origins go back to the 1890s.

== Relation to other conservation bodies ==
The organisation in 1926, largely through the efforts and support of Sydney Skaife in 1929, helped establish the Wild Life Protection and Conservation Society, which helped to establish the National Parks Board of South Africa, and led to the (official) proclamation of the Kruger National Park.

== Activities ==
WESSA produces two magazines:

- Environment – People and Conservation in Africa (which replaced African Wildlife)
- EnviroKids, which started as an insert in African Wildlife in 1972 and became Toktokkie magazine in 1976, changing its name to EnviroKids in 1998. The intent is to promote environmental awareness in children. In addition, each region produces its own monthly or bi-monthly newsletter.

WESSA participates in the activities of the international Foundation for Environmental Education (FEE) and has earned several of its Blue Flag beach certifications. It supports the international Eco-Schools programme of the FEE. The South African effort was launched in 2003.
