= Umbilo River =

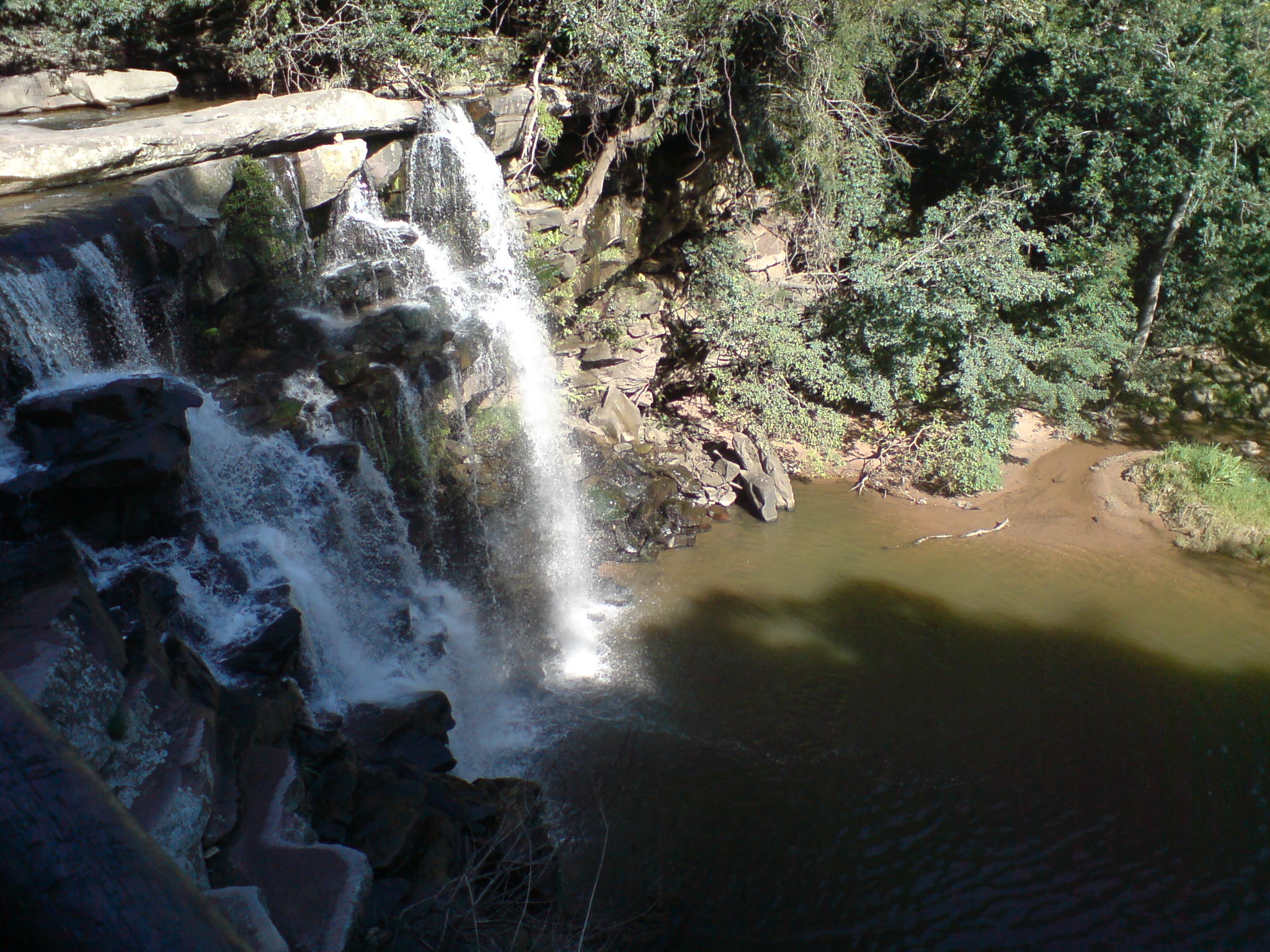
- Umbilo River at Paradise Valley

- Location of the Umbilo River mouth
- Native name: uMbilo (Zulu)

Location
- Country: South Africa
- Region: KwaZulu-Natal Province

Physical characteristics
- Mouth: Indian Ocean
  - location: Durban Harbour, South Africa
  - coordinates: 29.89899°S 31.00373°E

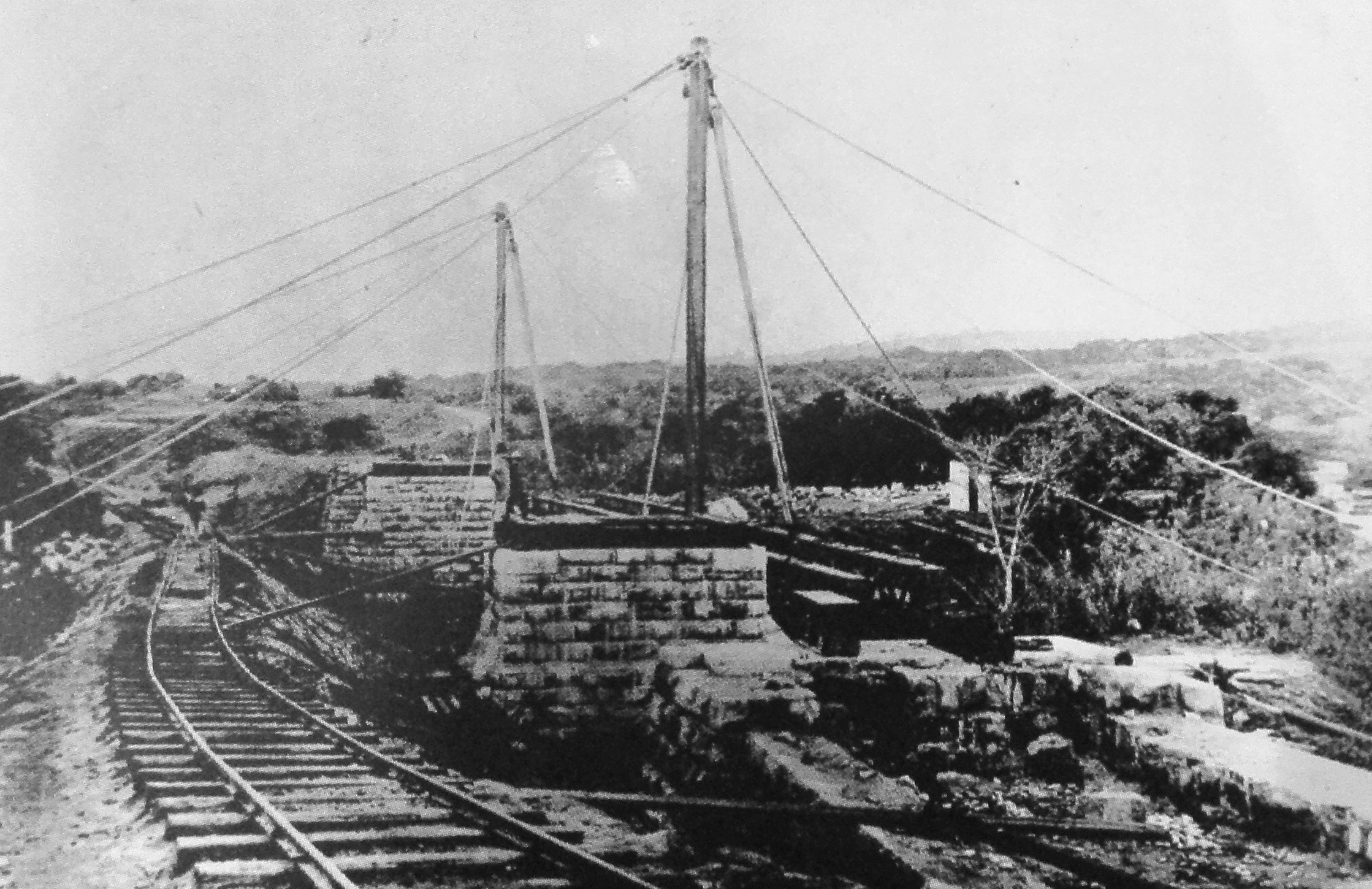
Construction of Umbilo River Bridge (July 1877; 149 years ago)

The Umbilo River is a river in KwaZulu-Natal, South Africa. The river rises in Kloof to the west of the city of Durban and the mouth of the river is situated in Durban harbour.

The Umbilo River forms part of the Durban Metro's D'Moss trail and conservation efforts.

== Environmental Issues ==
In 2015 residents complained about the constant pollution of the river over the previous two years, including terrible smell and a colour change to “smurf blue”. In October 2020, high levels of E. coli had been detected in the river, due to a malfunction at a sewage pump station. One week later 100 thousand litres of crude oil spilled into the Umbilo River.

In July 2020, a petition had been started by Greenpeace Africa and the uMbilo River Watch community group to stop the heavy pollution.

== See also ==
- List of rivers of South Africa
- List of reservoirs and dams in South Africa
