= Umgeni River Bird Park =

- Umgeni River Bird Park logo

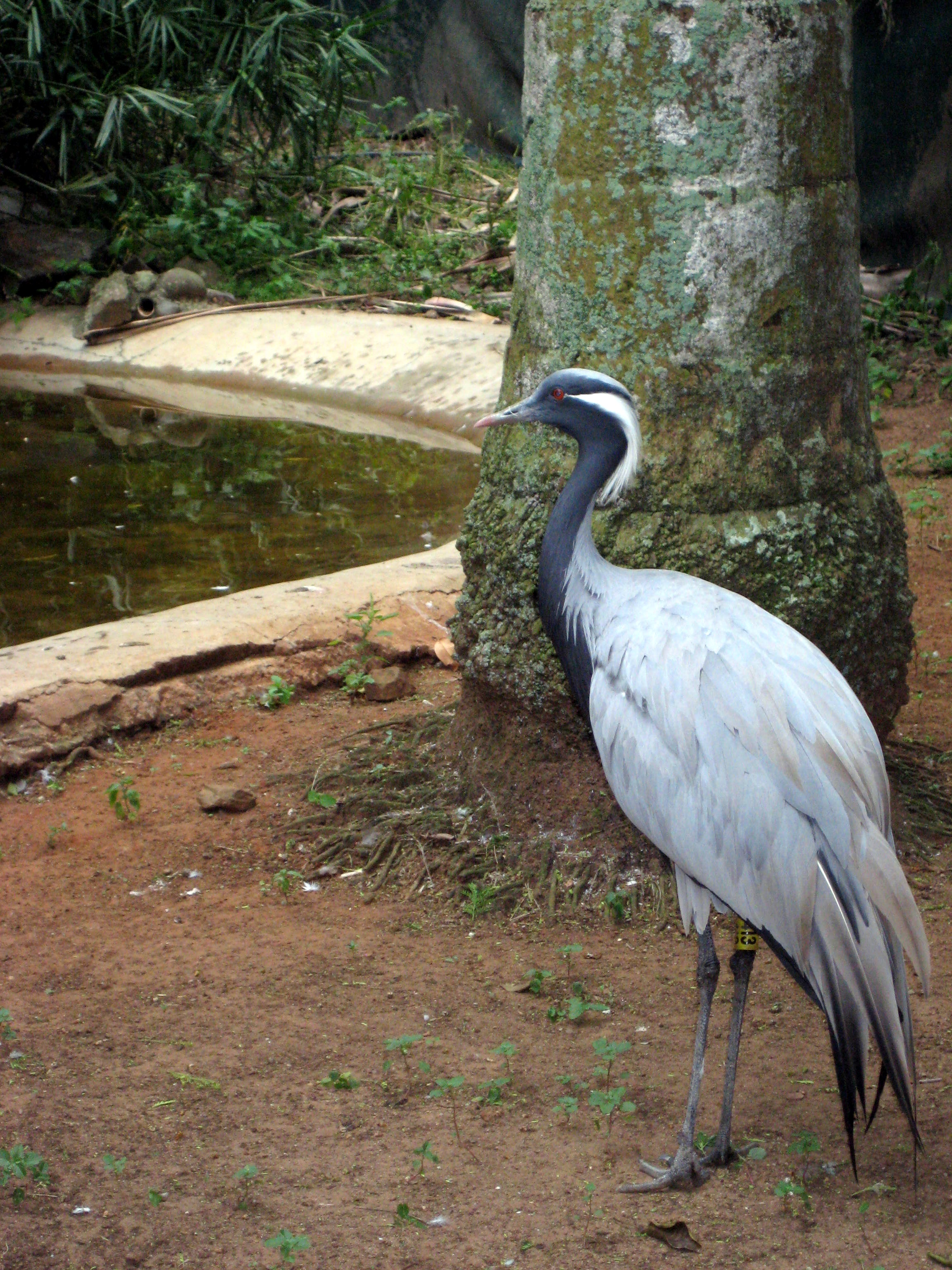
- Interactive map of Umgeni River Bird Park
- 29.8082294°S 31.0167405°E
- Date opened: 1984
- Location: Durban, South Africa
- No. of species: >300
- Website: www.umgeniriverbirdpark.co.za

The Umgeni River Bird Park is a bird zoo located in Durban, in the province of KwaZulu-Natal, South Africa.

== History ==
Designed and built by Dr. Alan Abrey in an old quarry site, the Umgeni River Bird Park was opened in April 1984. The park was owned privately by a group of bird lovers who wanted to educate others about birds from around the world. It was run by Alan Abrey until his retirement in 1997, and in those years the artwork for the park (guidebook illustrations, park maps, and so forth) were done by his daughter Robyn Abrey.

Floods in 1987 washed away the road in front of the park, and resulted in the temporary evacuation of the birds to Abrey's home on higher ground. By 1989, the park was home to over 4,500 birds of 400 different species, and was given the "Premier Durban Attraction" award by the Durban Tourism Board.

Construction of the Free Flight Bird Show arena was started in 1995, with the venue staging its first show in 1996.

The park was purchased by Tsogo Sun in 1997, with the new owners agreeing to uphold the park's "Inspire to Conserve" philosophy.

Tsogo Sun closed the park at the end of August 2009 because it was not financially viable. The Regency Foundation Network agreed to raise the R4.5 million necessary for the purchase, and the City took over the R3 million per year operating expenses. The Park was reopened in June 2010.

== Exhibits ==
Set in a landfilled and landscaped former quarry, the park includes several natural waterfalls. Paths for visitors wind through three aviaries and past other aviaries and open exhibits. A viewing window in the nursery lets visitors see how the birds are hatched and raised.

== Attractions ==
The Free Flight Bird Show, opened in 1996, features birds from North and South America, Africa, Indonesia, and Australia, and emphasizes conservation. Birds in the show includes owls, cranes, hornbills, macaws, kookaburras, toucans, vultures, in an open-air auditorium. The show is staged twice daily, weather permitting.

== Conservation ==
The park breeds 17 of the 24 threatened bird species in its collection. The park is involved with the South Africa Crane Working Group in breeding and then releasing the wattled crane. The birds are hand-reared using a glove puppet, and are then released near Dullstroom. Wattled cranes are listed as vulnerable on the IUCN Red List, and there are only about 8000 in the wild.
