= Durban Youth Council =

- Established: 1966
- Type: Community service, non-profit organization
- Location: Durban, KwaZulu-Natal, South Africa
- Members: 130
- Chairman: Kesin Raman
- Website: durbanyouthcouncil.co.za

The Durban Youth Council (DYC) is a non-profit, community service-based youth organization located in Durban, South Africa. The DYC aims to empower the youth of Durban through service to the community. The DYC help citizens and people in need that live in and around Durban. They work with charities and underprivileged schools. The organization has been operational since 1966 and was initially a project of the Junior Chamber South Africa (Durban Chapter). The Council is composed of over 100 grade 11 students from more than 30 schools in the Durban area. It is run by a democratic hierarchy of student and governed by an adult steering committee. It is not recognized as the official youth city council of Durban

== About ==
The DYC provides a learning platform for learners to develop their leadership qualities, through actively managing and participating in community based outreach projects. This is in efforts to develop an awareness of the community and uplift and empower the lives of many.

=== Core operations ===
The Durban Youth Council comprises 130 councilors, who hail from 40 schools in the greater Durban area. Membership changes each year. The council year begins in September of their Grade 10 year with their specific onboarding and ends in December of the next year. Each school has the opportunity of sending four grade 11 students to represent on the DYC, and a select number of schools have the opportunity of sending six. The DYC is run as a democracy, and each council year has its own hierarchy. The student Board runs the council, and is headed by a smaller group known as the Executive Board, consisting of a Mayor, Deputy Mayors, and a Council Manager.

Some of its more notable achievements have been the move in 2019 to a fully digital enabled operating model to enhance and streamline work and in 2020, the DYC introduced a Coaching Program (Develop Your Core) to better enable all students with more formal leadership development offered by its Steering Committee. Examples of the types of projects ran by the DYC are detailed in the 2014 DYC yearbook.

=== Pillars ===
Within the Durban Youth Council are identified pillars. As the Durban Youth Council's main objective is community service, there are six community service specialised group. Each committee is specialized to channel its community service projects into a category, E.g. Health, Social Development, Education . The pillars are as follows:

Education - Creating awareness of issues affecting the youth, as well as being a voice for the underprivileged.

Arts & Culture - Promoting a focus in the arts among the youth, with projects that target the culture of Durban.

Environmental - Targeting issues relating to the environment and infrastructure of the community.

Social Development - Helping those in need who may be affected by hunger, disability or a related cause as well as other groups who are oppressed or underprivileged.

Health - Targeting issues relating to epidemic diseases such as HIV, as well as the humanities.

Sports & Recreation - Encouraging an active lifestyle of sport and recreation among the youth, as well as the general population of Durban.

== Schools ==
A list of schools represented on the Durban Youth Council:

- Northwood High School
- Brettonwood High School
- Clifton College
- Danville Park Girls' High School
- Durban Girls' College
- Durban Girls' High School
- Durban High School
- Durban North College
- Eden College
- George Campbell School of Technology
- Glenwood High School
- Holy Family College
- Maris Stella School
- Mowat Park High School
- New Forest High School
- Northlands Girls' High School
- Orient Islamic School
- Our Lady of Fatima Dominican Convent School
- Pinetown Boys' High School
- Pinetown Girls' High School
- Queensburgh Girls' High School
- Ridge Park College
- Rossbury High School
- St. Henry's Marist College
- Westville Boys' High School
- Westville Girls' High School
