= Art Deco in Durban =

Local implementation of an architectural style

Art Deco in Durban represents the optimism in modernity and progress after World War One, and EThekwini Municipality has a treasure trove of notable buildings built in the Art Deco style, which was popularised in the US in the 1930s. Durban-style Art Deco buildings are similar and share the characteristic bold colours, geometric shapes and glamorous ornamentals of the global style, while incorporating local narratives and motifs.

The styling of Art Deco buildings in Durban reflects the different backgrounds of the city's population. Some buildings, such as Quadrant House on the Victoria Embankment, emphasise the city's maritime background. Other buildings, such as Ebrahim Court and the Essop Moosa Building, are built in a style reflecting the interests of Durban's Muslim traders in the 1930s. Some of the buildings pay allegiance to Durban's long association with the British Empire, such as Empire Court and Dominion Court.

== Notable examples ==
Some notable examples of the Art Deco style in Durban:

- Albany Hotel
- Berea Court (Berea Road West, Berea)
- Colonial Mutual Building (West Street, Durban Central)
- Memorial Tower Building (University of KwaZulu-Natal, Howard College Campus)
- Surrey Mansions (Currie Road, Berea)
- Kintyre (Clark Road, Glenwood)
- Jubilee Court (Clarence Road, Morningside)

The cenotaph in the central square outside the City Hall is another striking Art Deco construction.

== Preservation of buildings ==
Due to a number of factors including inner city urban decay, a number of Art Deco style buildings are presently in a state of disrepair.

The Durban Art Deco Society was founded in 2000 in order to raise awareness of the value of Art Deco buildings to the city's architectural heritage.

== Gallery ==
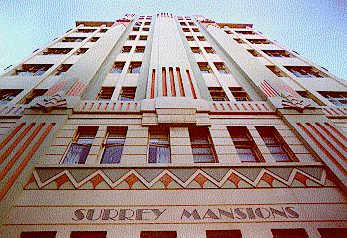
Surrey Mansions - Durban

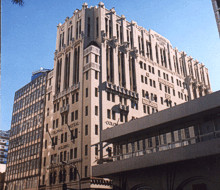
Colonial Mutual - Durban

== See also ==
- List of Art Deco buildings in Melbourne
- List of Art Deco buildings in Tasmania
- Napier, New Zealand
