= Durban People Mover =

Bus service in Durban, South Africa

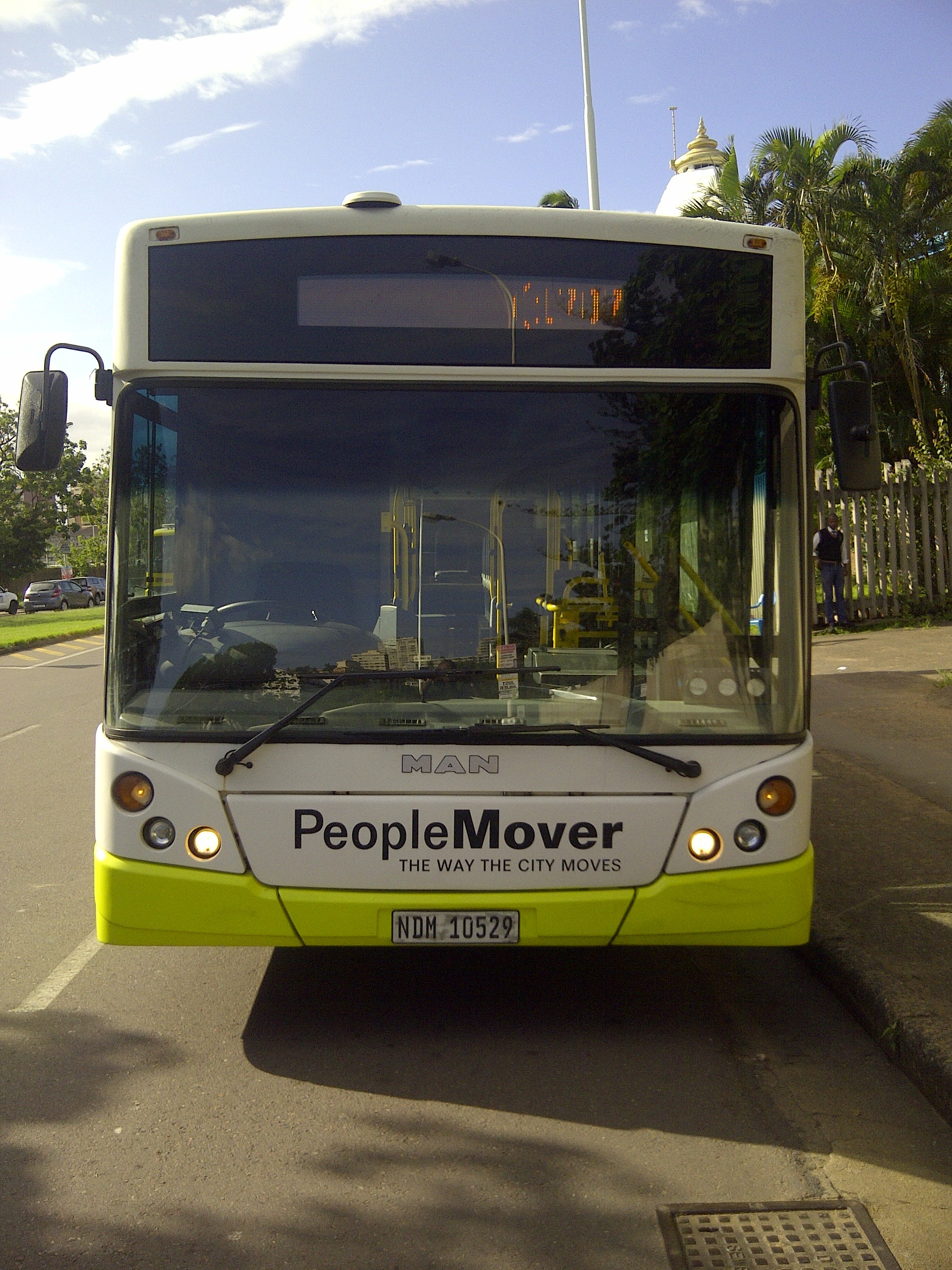
- Industry: Durban Transport
- Headquarters: Durban
- Products: Road transport
- Website: durbanpeoplemover.co.za

The Durban People Mover is a South African tourist-oriented bus service which runs every 15 minutes and consists of three routes within the central business district and along the beachfront, connecting various attractions. This new bus system forms part of a transport redesign process that the city implemented in preparation for the 2010 FIFA World Cup.

== The People Mover ==
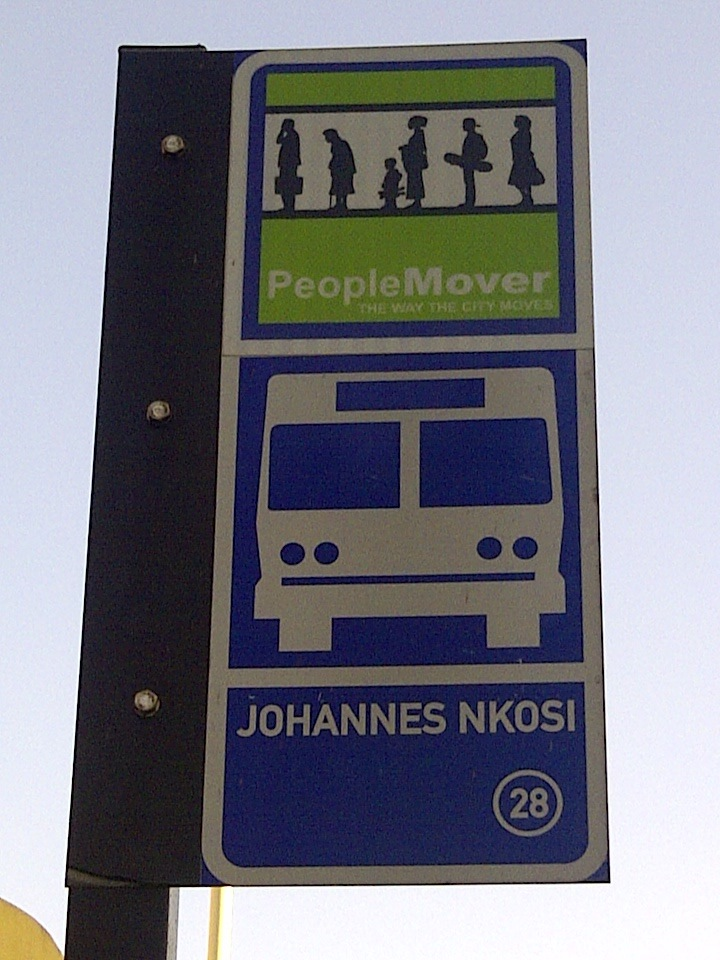
One of the People Mover Terminal Board

The attractive, brightly colored buses travel through the city every 15 minutes and are a popular, fun way to travel around the city or along the beachfront. There is wheelchair access, and bus-stop wardens offer help to disabled passengers requiring assistance, route and schedule information and security to all waiting passengers. With closed circuit surveillance cameras installed on each bus and wardens stationed at all stops to help tourists and passengers, the People Mover promises a safe and reliable public transport system. With an access ramp for wheelchairs and prams, and on board information about the city, the buses cover the beachfront and inner city routes from 6:30am to 11pm every day.

== Tickets ==
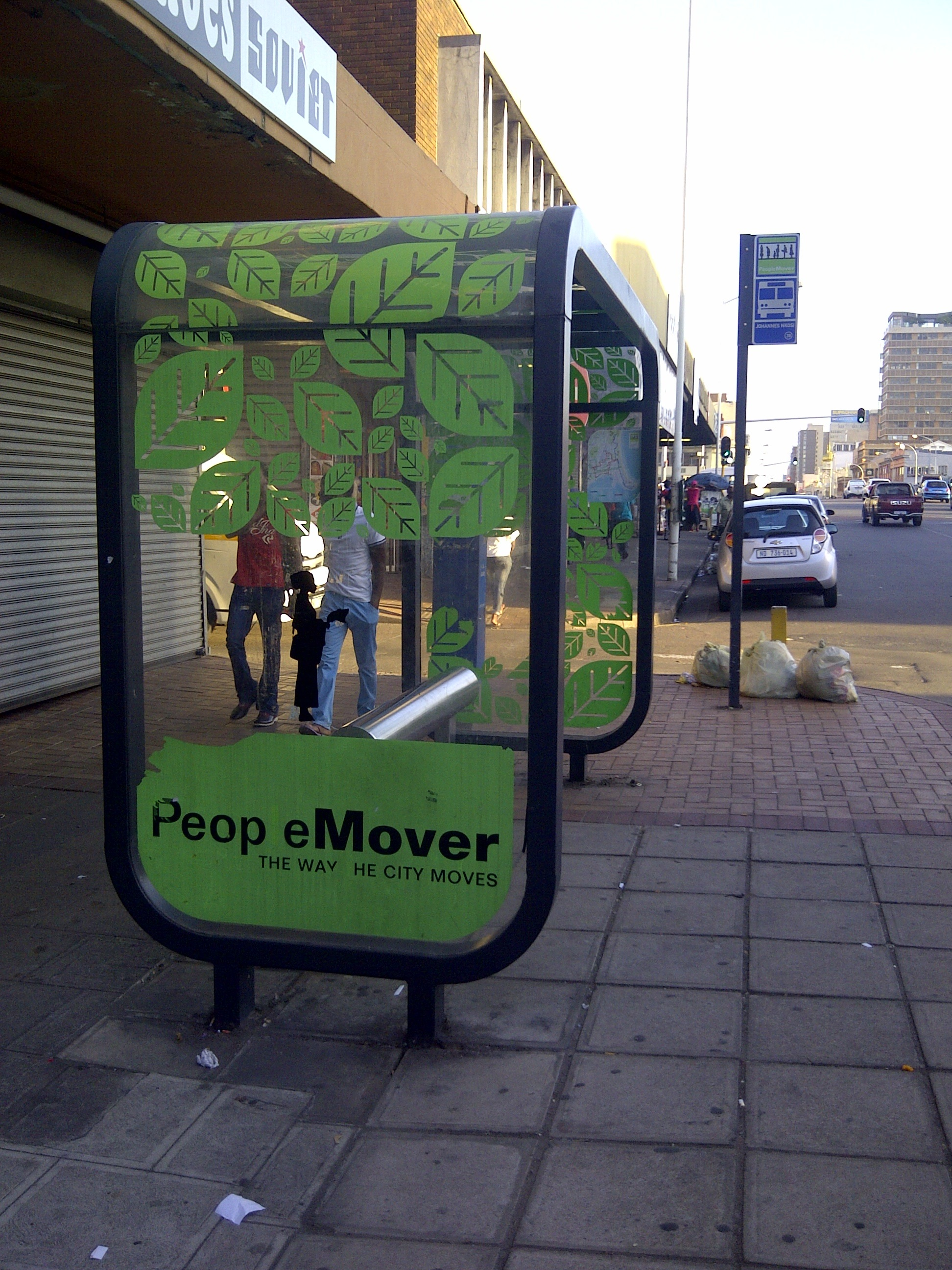
One of the People Mover Terminal, Terminal No. 28

A single journey on the People Mover will cost R7 (ZAR) and a full-day pass will cost you R17.00 (ZAR). Phase one of the Durban People Mover bus transport system has been successfully operating for 2 years, transporting local and visiting commuters in air-conditioned, safe and reliable comfort. The attractive, brightly colored buses travel through the city every 15 minutes and are a popular, fun way to travel around the city or along the beachfront City Loop. Passengers who wish to change between one route and another are allowed to switch buses at the transfer station within the 90 minute free transfer period.

== Operating hours ==
The Durban People Mover service runs daily from 05h00 to 22h00. These extended operating hours allow commuters greater freedom and access to Durban's entertainment and business areas.

== Routes ==
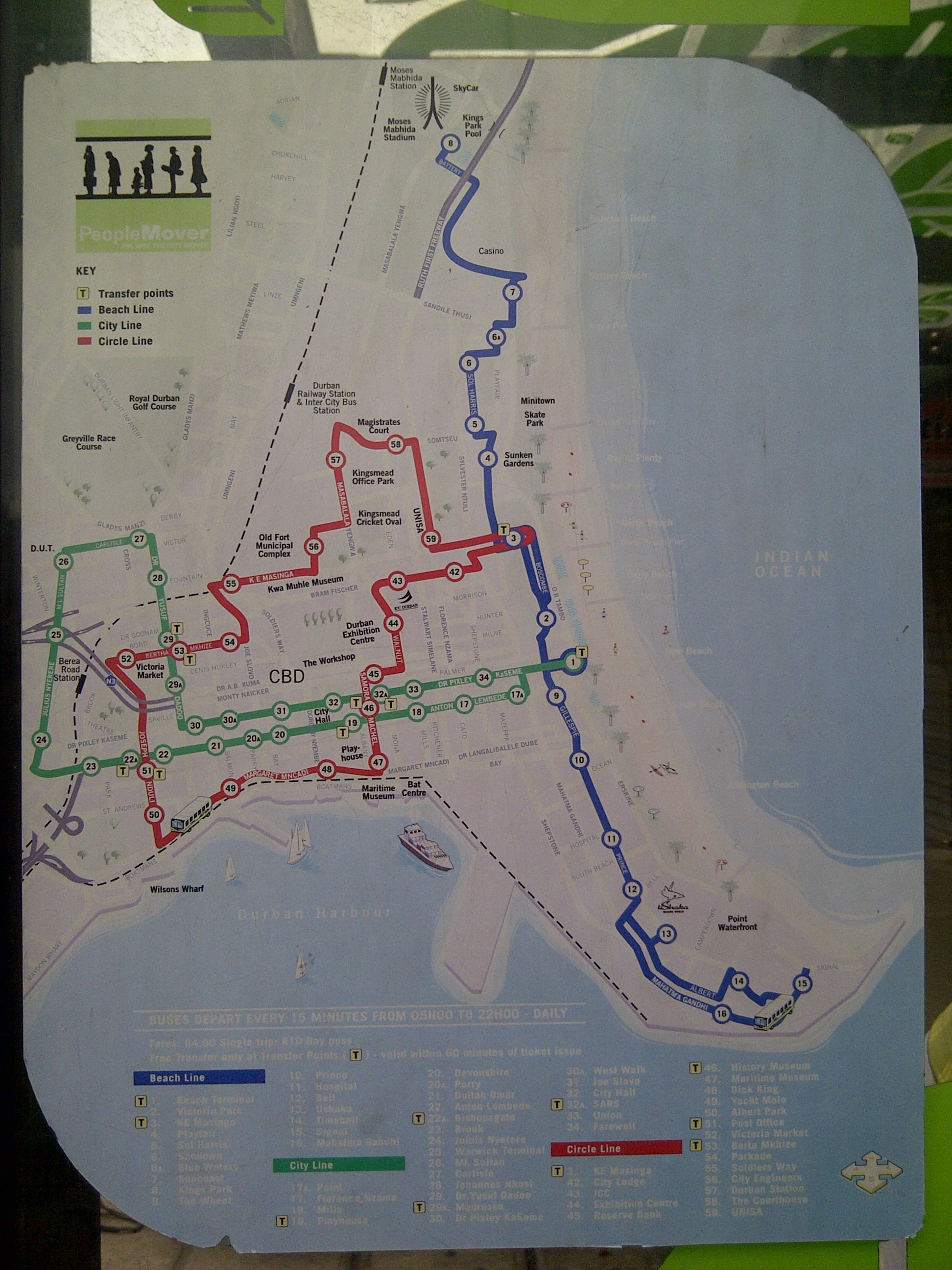
Durban People Mover City Routes Map

=== City Line ===
A circular route through the main city thoroughfares, Starting and ending at the Dr Pixley KaSeme Street transfer interchange, stopping close to Durban City Hall, The Playhouse theatre, Tourism Information Centre, Inkosi Albert Luthuli International Convention Centre, the Victoria street market and the Durban's mosque and Cathedral.

=== Beach Line ===
A scenic line which runs along the Northern and Southern city beaches, starting at the Suncoast Casino and Entertainment World and ending at uShaka Marine World. The route runs through the interchange at Dr Pixley KaSeme Street, (formerly West Street) facilitating passengers who wish to change to the city loop.
