= Ne obliviscaris =

Ne obliviscaris (Latin "Do not forget") may refer to:

== Mottos ==
- Ne Obliviscaris, motto of the Duke of Argyll as chief of the Clan Campbell, or schools related to the clan:
  - Campbell College
  - George Campbell School of Technology
  - Campbell Collegiate
  - Campbell Hall School
  - Albert Campbell Collegiate Institute
- Ne Obliviscaris, motto of the Princess Louise's Argyll and Sutherland Highlanders, or namesake ships:
  - HMS Argyll
  - HMS Argyll (F231)

== Other ==
- Ne Obliviscaris: Dinna Forget, memoirs of Lady Frances Balfour, 1930
- Ne Obliviscaris (band), an Australian band
