= Durban Art Gallery =

Art Gallery

The Durban Art Gallery, situated in Durban, South Africa, holds the status of a municipal art gallery under the administration of the by eThekwini Metropolitan Municipality. Its origins trace back to its establishment in 1892, making it a longstanding institution within the region.

== Information ==
The Durban Art Gallery, located in Durban, South Africa, serves as a repository of diverse artistic expressions from Africa and beyond. The gallery proudly showcases an extensive collection of artworks and crafts contributed by artists hailing from various continents. Its mandate revolves around fostering cultural appreciation and facilitating a cross-cultural exchange of artistic ideas.

Situated within the same edifice, the building housing the Durban Art Gallery is a multifaceted cultural hub. In addition to the art gallery, it also accommodates the Durban Central Municipal Library, offering a wealth of literary resources to the community. Furthermore, the premises house the Durban Natural Science & History Museum, enriching visitors with insights into the natural world and the historical evolution of the region. This confluence of cultural, literary, and scientific institutions encapsulates a profound commitment to intellectual enrichment and the dissemination of knowledge within the heart of Durban's vibrant cultural landscape.
