= Durban Academy High School =

Location
- Cnr. Bluff Rd & Shipman Pl, Fynnlands, Bluff, Durban, 4052; Fynnlands, Bluff, KwaZulu-Natal; South Africa; 29°54′04″S 31°01′45″E

Information
- Former name: Hoërskool Dirkie Uys
- Type: Public school
- Motto: Latin: Providete
- Established: 1 January 1956
- School district: Umlazi
- School number: +2731 466 1323
- Ministry of Education Institution no.: 500121656
- Principal: Mrs L. Theron (2018 - 2023)
- Grades: 8 to 12
- Colors: White, navy and blue
- Website: dbnacademy.co.za

Durban Academy High School is a bilingual (Afrikaans and English) high school located in Fynnlands, Bluff, Durban.

== History ==
At the beginning of 1956 the first Afrikaans school on the Bluff, KwaZulu-Natal opened its doors to the pupils of Bluff and surrounding areas. The school was initially named Island View School, in 1957 the school was renamed Hoërskool Dirkie Uys. The school started as a primary school (pupils from Grade 1 to Standard 6, now known as Grade 8), in 1959 it became a high school. Mr P.R.T. Nel was the founding principal. In 1962 the first group of pupils matriculated from Hoërskool Dirkie Uys.

== Dual medium ==
Subsequent to South Africa becoming a democracy in 1994, many Afrikaans schools became parallel medium schools (two different language taught at the same school); in 1997 Hoërskool Dirkie Uys became a parallel medium school and the first English speaking pupils were admitted. The school's name changed from Hoërskool Dirkie Uys to Durban Academy High School on 1 April 1997.

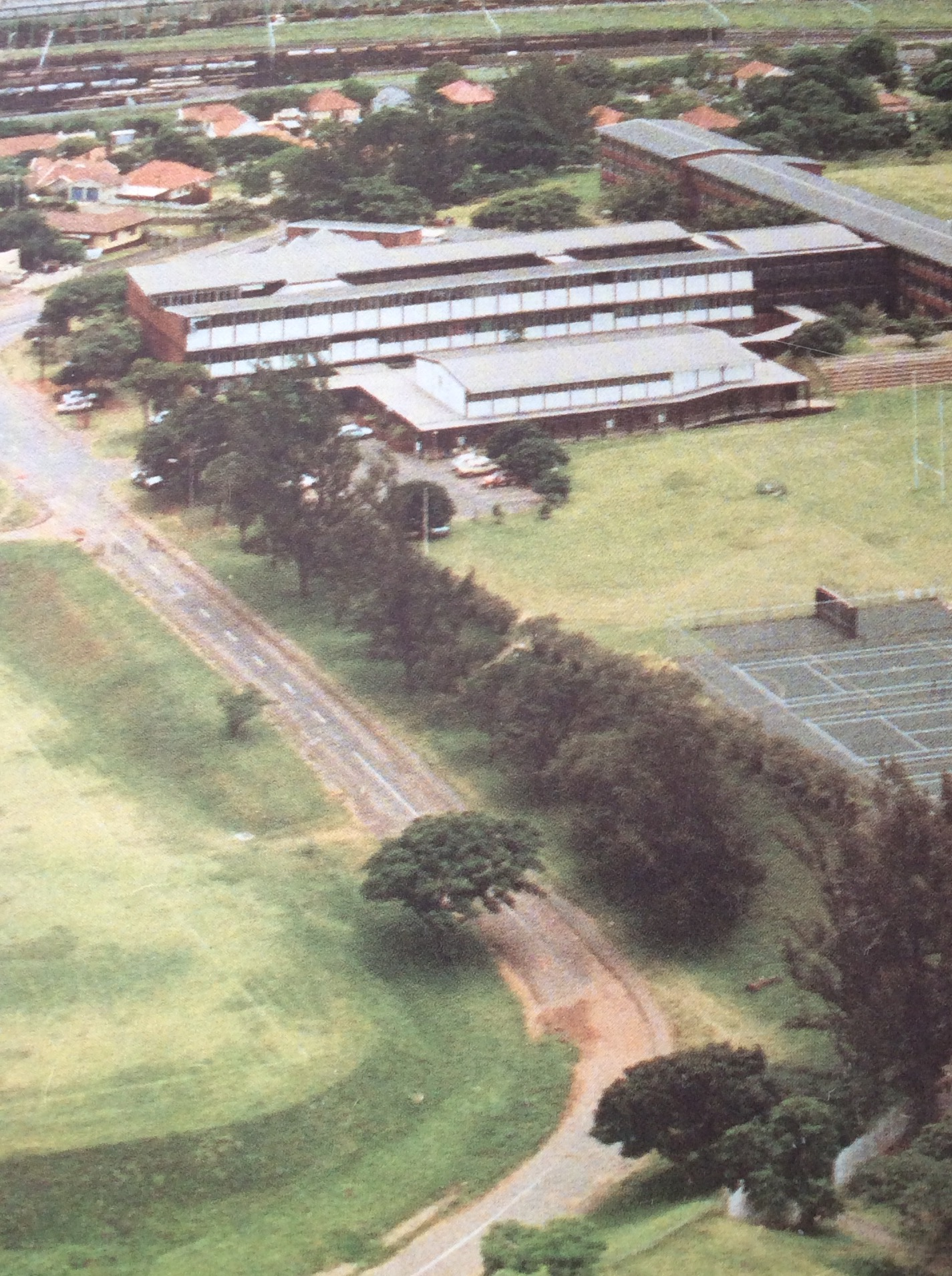
School building in 1997

== Hoërskool Dirkie Uys School Song ==
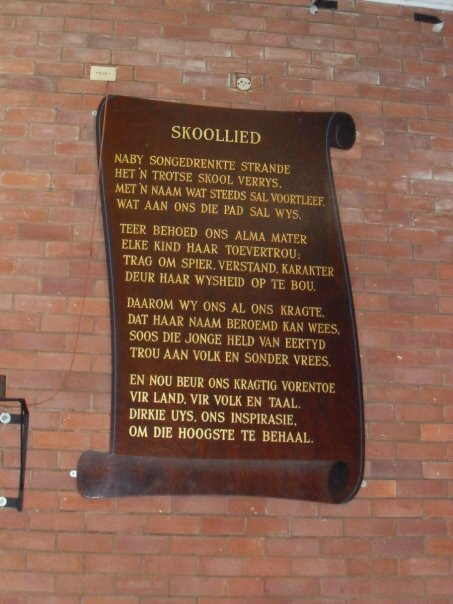
Hoërskool Dirkie Uys School Song

"NABY SONGEDRENKTE STRANDE
HET Ń TROTSE SKOOL VERRYS,
MET Ń NAAM WAT STEEDS SAL VOORTLEEF,
WAT AAN ONS DIE PAD SAL WYS.

TEER BEHOED ONS ALMA MATER
ELKE KIND HAAR TOEVERTROU:
TRAG OM SPIER, VERSTAND, KARAKTER
DEUR HAAR WYSHEID OP TE BOU.

DAAROM WY ONS AL ONS KRAGTE,
DAT HAAR NAAM BEROEMD KAN WEES,
SOOS DIE JONGE HELD VAN EERTYD
TROU AAN VOLK EN SONDER VREES.

EN NOU BEUR ONS KRAGTIG VORENTOE
VIR LAND, VIR VOLK EN TAAL.
DIRKIE UYS, ONS INSPIRASIE,
OM DIE HOOGSTE TE BEHAAL."

== Present Day ==
Durban Academy has won numerous awards including the Best High School on the South Durban community and surrounding areas in 2012 and 2014, by the Southlands Sun community news paper. As recently as 2016, Durban Academy High School had 589 students and 35 educators.
