= Kloof High School =

High School in Kloof, South Africa

- Kloof, Durban, KwaZulu-Natal; South Africa

Information
- School type: Co-education High school
- Motto: In Hoc Signo Vinces (In this sign thou shalt conquer)
- Established: 1960; 66 years ago
- Founder: Mr Grand Louden and Professor Desmond Clarence
- Locale: Suburban
- School number: +27 (031) 764 0451
- Principal: Mr Robert Holding
- Grades: 8–12
- Gender: Co-educational
- Age: 13 to 18
- Enrollment: +1000
- Average class size: 28
- Schedule: 07:30 - 14:30
- Campus: Suburban Campus
- Houses: Churchill; Founders; Keller
- Colors: Navy; Yellow; White
- Slogan: To be the best that I can be
- Mascot: Leopard
- Feeder schools: Kloof Senior Primary School; Atholl Heights Primary School; Winston Park Primary School; Forest View Primary School; Hillcrest Primary School
- Website: www.kloofhigh.co.za

Kloof High School is a public, English medium co-educational high school located in Kloof, a small town between the provincial capital of Pietermaritzburg and Durban in the KwaZulu-Natal province of South Africa.

== History ==
Kloof High School opened in February 1960 under the first headmaster, Mr G. Goodwin. The 127 students were taught in prefabricated classrooms situated on a temporary site at the corner of Emolweni and Dan Pienaar Roads in the village of Kloof.

The school grew quickly under the third principal, Mr Dudley Barton, who succeeded Mr J.F. Dixon in July 1963. Construction had begun on permanent buildings in 1963 and by mid–1964 the students in the eighth to eleventh grades were able to move into their new classrooms. For some time the prefabs on the top field remained as further building continued. In 1965 the first grade 12 pupils wrote the School's first matriculation examinations, and the school houses, Churchill, Founders and Keller, were established.

In 1969, Mr T. Gerdener (then Provincial Administrator for Natal) officially opened the school. At that time, there were 524 students and 26 teachers, and a further classroom wing, including an Art Studio and Media Centre had been added and a school hall. During the July holidays of that year the first sports tours were undertaken with a 1st Hockey XI touring the Eastern Cape and the first rugby touring Rhodesia (now Zimbabwe). The faith of the founders had been justified and a coat of arms was designed by Mr Alan Woodrow, including the motto: "In hoc signo vinces" meaning "In this sign (the cross) you will conquer."

Academic, sporting and cultural aspects of school life were catered for but Mr Barton felt the spiritual needs of the students should be met. Fund raising began for a chapel and the Dudley Barton Sanctuary was opened in 1977, dedicated by the Bishop of Natal. Despite being a public school, Kloof High retains its Christian ethos, but accommodates pupils of all religions.

Mr Barton retired in 1978 and was succeeded by Mr H.M. Puzey under whom the school continued to grow. Further classrooms were built including a Computer Room. On the sports front, provincial and, on occasion, national honours, were earned in swimming, (the school now had a swimming pool), cricket, hockey, athletics and tennis. Mr Hugh Deane was Principal from 1989 until 1994.

In January 1995 Mr Deane was succeeded by Mr Dave Seager. The school was declared a Model C school early in the nineties, and a school governing body was formed to deal with financial concerns.

In the new millennium, the school introduced a sports centre, the John Dickson Indoor Centre, and an auditorium.

During March 2005, Mr Seager resigned and was replaced by Mrs Dawn A. Lefort in her capacity as Acting Principal. She has worked at the School since 1977 as a French and History teacher.

=== Principals ===
- Mr G.M.N. Goodwin (1960–1961)
- Mr Blake (Acting Principal until Jan 1962)
- Mr J.F. Dixon (Jan 1962 – Dec 1962)
- Dr G.S. Jackson (Acting Principal: Jan 1963 – July 1963)
- Mr Dudley Barton (July 1963 – 1978)
- Mr H.M. Puzey (1979–1988)
- Mr Hugh Deane (1989–1994)
- Mr Dave Seager (1995 – March 2005)
- Mrs D Lefort (2005 - 2020)
- Mr R Holding (2020–present)

== The School Today ==
The school's location is on the tree-lined avenues of Kloof.

Kloof High School is an English-medium school that is run by the KwaZulu-Natal Department of Education and a school governing body. Approximately 26 teachers are employed by the governing body and about 23 are employed by the Department of Education.

About 1000 students, mostly from the suburbs of Kloof, Everton, Gillitts, Waterfall and Forest Hills attend the school. A daily school bus operates from Knowles Superspar in Pinetown.

=== Facilities ===
- 10-lane swimming pool.
- Main field.
- 2nd/ "Top" field.
- Three cricket nets and portable nets, with bowling machine.
- Rock Climbing wall
- Hall fitted with lighting and an orchestra pit for productions.
- Pavilion and catering kitchen
- Changing rooms
- Grandstand on main Field
- Portable stands on other fields
- Chapel
- Synthetic grass hockey field
- Dance room

Other facilities:

- Media Centre
- Drama Studio
- Three Tuckshops
- Auditorium
- Two Computer Centres
- The John Dixon Indoor Centre
- Gym and physiotheraphy centres

== Academics ==
Kloof High School's students write the KwaZulu-Natal Department of Education NSC exams and consistently achieve good results.

KHS is an English-Medium school. It offers Afrikaans and isiZulu as second languages (or "First Additional Languages" in the new FET curriculum) as well as French and German as third languages ("Second Additional Languages"). German Second Additional Language can only be taken as an 8th Matriculation subject unless permission has been granted by the KwaZulu-Natal Department of Education for the child to take German as an incorporated 7th subject or at "Home Language" level.

== Subjects ==
=== GET Level (Grades 8 and 9) ===
- English
- Afrikaans/isiZulu
- Life Orientation (L.O.) [Includes P.E.]
- Arts & Culture
- Technology
- Economic & Management Science (EMS)
- Social Sciences
- Natural Sciences
- Information Technology (I.T.)

=== FET Level (Grades 10 – 12) ===
In a student's Grade 9 year, they choose one of the subjects from each Line set out below. In the case of the Optional line; students approach Mrs Roux for assistance — except for 'Additional Mathematics'.

Line 1	Line 2	Line 3	Line 4	Line 5	Line 6	Line 7
English	Afrikaans	Mathematics	L.O.	History	History	EGD
	isiZulu	Maths Lit.		Geography	Geography	Bus. Std.
				P.Sciences	French	Cons.Std.
				L.Sciences	Accounting	Drama
					Vis.Art	I.T.
						P.Sci
						L.Sciences

Note: under the Optional heading, all of the languages stated can only be taken as 2nd Additional Languages — unless prior consent has been given by the Department of Education. These optional languages are taught by Mrs. O. Roux at either conversational level or NSC Examination level.

==== Subjects ====
Mathematical Literacy

- The definition of Mathematical literacy, as taken from the National Curriculum Statement is as follows:

"Mathematical Literacy provides learners with an awareness and understanding of the role that mathematics plays in the modern world. Mathematical Literacy is a subject driven by life-related applications of mathematics. It enables learners to develop the ability and confidence to think numerically and spatially in order to interpret and critically analyse everyday situations and to solve problems‖. For many learners, mathematics is frightening, obscure and unattainable. Mathematical Literacy provides an excellent alternative to Mathematics, and learners who study it have found that, because it is rooted in real-life experiences, it is a subject that makes sense and is eminently do-able."

Life Orientation is unique to South Africa. Civic education, in American schools, resembles this compulsory subject. There is no final NSC exam although learners must complete a final standardised task set by the KZN Department of Education in their Grade 12-year. The final Life Orientation mark is based on work from Grades 10, 11 and 12. This means learners build a portfolio throughout their FET phase.

Physical Sciences takes Chemistry and Physics and uses them to improve lives while still caring for the environment. In other countries, students take Physics PLUS Chemistry as electives but in the case of all South African Schools – Physical Science is the amalgamation of both.

Life Sciences (formerly Biology). Four themes are covered in each grade, namely:

- Cells and Tissues
- Organs and Systems
- Environmental Studies
- Biodiversity

Visual Art.

- As stated in the National Curriculum Statement:

"The subject Visual Arts offers learners a way to meaningfully engage with and respond to their world. It provides opportunities to stimulate and develop learners‘ intellect, engaging their creative imagination through visual and tactile experiences and the innovative use of materials and technology in the realisation of their ideas. This provides the basis for learners to develop an individual visual language, which in turn is informed and shaped by immersion in the visual culture of the past and present."

Engineering Graphics and Design is a communication and management tool that links those who design and plan with those who produce the artefacts and systems. It is used in the design phase to record and develop ideas, and in the manufacturing phase to guide those who do the manufacturing.

Business Studies deals with the knowledge, skills, attitudes and values critical for participation in the economic sectors.

Consumer Studies (commonly referred to as Home Economics) focuses on enabling learners to become informed consumers of food, clothing, housing, furnishings and household equipment. Learners entering Grade 10 will not have any prior knowledge of Consumer Studies and will be introduced to the subject for the first time in their Grade 10-year.

Dramatic Arts is concerned both with the workings of the imagination and with the discipline of craftsmanship. Practical work and written work are equally weighted. Drama assessment is 50% practical work and 50% theory (or written work). There is a written and practical exam in June and at the end of each year, as well as continuous assessment throughout the year.

Information Technology (formerly Computer Science HG is a practically oriented subject that focuses primarily on software development. The Practical Assessment Task comprises a practical task or project using the applicable developmental tools. Core Mathematics is a prerequisite of this subject. IT is a new subject to Kloof High School as the school is phasing out CAT (Computer Applications Technology).

== Extracurriculars/extra-murals ==
=== Sports ===
Sports offered include rugby, hockey (both indoor and outdoor), water polo, soccer (football), swimming, and athletics as well as rock climbing and adventure racing, represented by both boys and girls teams. Boys can participate in cricket, while girls take part in netball and softball.

Boys	Girls	Together
Soccer	Soccer	Chess
Rugby	Netball	Cross-Country
Indoor/Outdoor Hockey	Indoor/Outdoor Hockey	Squash
Tennis	Tennis	Rock Climbing
Waterpolo	Waterpolo	Swimming
Cricket	(Cricket)	
	Touch Rugby	
	Softball	

== Cultural ==
The cultural community of the school comprises:

- Student Leadership
- Matric Dance Committee (Grade 11 only)
- Toastmasters International (Grade 11 only)
- Student Representative Council (aka Learners Rep. Council = RCL)
- Media Centre Duty
- Choir
- Public Speaking
- Computers (LAN)
- Catering
- Environmental Club (aka E-COPS)
- Interact Club
- Photography
- Academic Olympiads:

— English Olympiad
— Mathematics Olympiad
— Afrikaans Olympiad
— Life Science Olympiad
— Physical Science Olympiad

- Drama:

— Performing
— Lighting Crew
— Backstage Crew

- Bulls & Bears (aka Debs and Squires)
- First Aid
- Business Studies (JSE Challenge)
- Art Extension + Quilting Club
- Band

== Traditions ==
The school celebrates its Founders Day every year on the final day of the second term (usually on 22 June) by commemorating its first set of grade 12 students.

== School uniform ==
The blazer is royal blue and special awards (such as honours, colours or honours cum laude) are indicated with yellow ribbing for colours or white, blue and yellow, in the case of honours. The tie is striped with royal blue, navy blue and yellow. Blazer and tie are not required during the summer terms for girls.

Matrics have the privilege of a slightly different uniform. This includes a white, as opposed to navy, school jersey. They also have the option of special ties. Most importantly, though, they are then allowed to purchase their annually renewed Matric Jackets. The jacket design is voted for by the upcoming Matric class and designed by the Students of that year
