= Warwick Junction, Durban =

Warwick Junction, also known as Warwick Triangle, is a transportation and trading hub in the city of Durban, South Africa. It is the largest of its kind in South Africa. The area sees up to 460,000 people daily, who come to the area for its transport interchange and market shopping.

== History ==
Initially used as a market space by Indian traders during apartheid, the area become popular with black traders towards to the end of apartheid.

== Markets ==
Warwick Junction is home to nine distinct markets, where informal and formal traders sell a variety of products, from food to traditional medicine. There are approximately 5,000 to 8,000 vendors in the area.

The Bead Market has vendors who are mostly from coastal areas adjacent to Durban selling traditional Zulu beadwork items.

Berea Station Market, located near two rail stations, has vendors selling traditional Zulu items such as spears and shields, as well as modern clothing and technology items.

The Bovine Head Market consists of vendors who cook and sell cows' heads, a traditional African delicacy.

Brook Street Market consists of two sections: an upper-level food court, and a lower-level market with vendors selling clothing and household goods. It is located alongside the Badsha Peer Shrine, built by the original Indian traders in the area.

The Early Morning Market is the most famous of all the markets at Warwick Junction, and consists of up to 200 traders. Products on offer include fresh produce, spices, and flowers. This market has been earmarked for a shopping mall development.

The Herb Market consists of vendors who sell traditional African medicine. There are up to 700 traders in this market. Traditional healers diagnose customers according to their ailments and then recommend a herbal product for the relief of symptoms.

The Impepho and Lime Market has vendors who sell white and red lime, mined in Ndwedwe north of Durban. This lime is used by sangomas, or traditional healers. Vendors also sell incense known as impepho, which is believed to help with communication with one's ancestors. The impepho vendors are almost exclusively from Lusikisiki in the Eastern Cape Province, who collect the herbs that grow in that area and travel to Durban to sell them.

Victoria Street Market was founded in 1910 as the Indian Market, and consists of 180 traders with individually owned stores selling jewellery, spices, and traditional art.

== Transportation ==
The Warwick Triangle area became an important transportation hub during apartheid, as Indian and African-owned buses were not allowed access to the inner city. Today, the area is the largest transportation hub in the city, with a taxi rank, bus rank, and railway stations linking to the city's different nodes.
