= Sipho Ngwenya =

South African politician

Sipho Ngwenya was the first democratically elected mayor of the Greater city of Durban. He was the first black mayor of the city in the post-apartheid era of South Africa. Durban, South Africa's third largest city, saw a number of name changes, from Greater City of Durban to Durban UniCity, before the current and final, eThekwini Metropolitan Municipality.

Sipho Ngwenya was a member of the Inkatha Freedom Party (IFP) when he was elected as mayor. He was the first citizen of Durban for two years of the first five-year democratic term. During South Africa's first democratic elections of 1994, the province of KwaZulu-Natal was won by the Inkatha Freedom Party. In 1996, the Greater City of Durban was restructured to form the Durban UniCity, where an African National Congress (ANC) 1994 mayoral candidate, Obed Mlaba, was then appointed the mayor.

In the year 2003, a constitutional amendment by the South African parliament called floor crossing was passed. Sipho Ngwenya was one of the first high-profile politicians who utilized this bill and crossed from the Inkatha Freedom Party to the African National Congress.
