= Victor Xulu =

South African cricketer (born 1983)

Personal information
- Full name: Victor Sandile Xulu
- Born: 11 April 1983 (age 43); Durban, Natal Province, South Africa
- Batting: Right-handed
- Bowling: Right-arm off-break
- Role: Wicket-keeper

Domestic team information
- Years: Team
- 2010: KwaZulu-Natal

Career statistics
| Competition | FC | LA |
|---|---|---|
| Matches | 1 | 1 |
| Runs scored | 0 | 10 |
| Batting average | 0.00 | 10.00 |
| 100s/50s | 0/0 | 0/0 |
| Top score | 0 | 10 |
| Catches/stumpings | 0/– | 1/– |
- Source: CricketArchive, 14 December 2014

Victor Sandile Xulu (born 11 April 1983) is a former South African cricketer who played at first-class and limited overs level for KwaZulu-Natal during the 2009–10 season.

A wicket-keeper from Durban, Xulu played in the KwaZulu-Natal under-19 side that drew the final of the 2001–02 UCB Under-19 Competition with Western Province. He made his first-class debut for KwaZulu-Natal in March 2010, against Border in the CSA Provincial Three-Day Competition. In what was to be his only first-class match, he played solely as an opening batsman, with the wicket-keeping duties falling to Matthew Boote. He made a pair opening with Boote in each innings, falling twice to Lundi Mbane. In the corresponding one-day fixture between KwaZulu-Natal and Border, Xulu replaced Boote as wicket-keeper. He came in third in the batting order, scoring ten runs from eleven balls, comprising two boundaries (a four and a six).
