= Jayapraga Reddy =

- Born: 1947; Durban, KwaZulu-Natal, South Africa
- Died: 1996 (aged 48–49); Durban, KwaZulu-Natal, South Africa
- Writing career
- Language: English
- Genres: Short stories, plays, autobiography
- Notable works: The Web of Persuasion; On the Fringe of Dreamtime and Other Stories; The Unbending Reed

Jayapraga Reddy (1947–1996) was an Indian South African writer of short stories, plays, and a memoir.

Reddy was born in Durban in 1947, where she would live her whole life. Reddy was affected by muscular dystrophy, as were two of her brothers, and she used a wheelchair for most of her life.

Reddy published her first story, "The Lost Tube of Toothpaste", when she was only twelve years old. She enjoyed unusual success both domestically and internationally as an Indian woman during apartheid: in 1975 her stories "The Love Beads" and "The Stricken Land" were broadcast on the BBC and in the 1980s several more of her stories were published in Staffrider and her play, The Web of Persuasion, was produced by SABC. Her 1987 short story collection, On the Fringe of Dreamtime and Other Stories, was one of only a handful of books by South African women of colour published in that decade. Many of Reddy's stories explore themes of race, gender, family and disability.

Reddy composed an autobiography, titled The Unbending Reed, which she submitted to a number of publishers. The book was still unpublished when she died in 1996.
