= Quadrant House (Durban) =

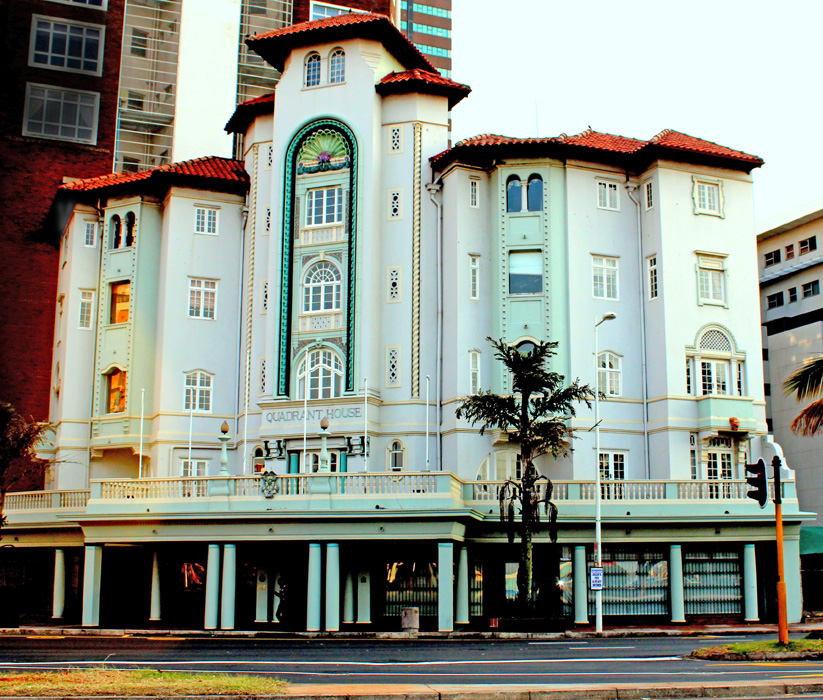
- Quadrant House in Durban
- Click on the map for a fullscreen view

General information
- Architectural style: Art Deco
- Location: Durban, South Africa
- Coordinates: 29°51′40.85″S 31°01′21.81″E
- Client: H. Live

Design and construction
- Architect: Ritchie McKinlay

The Quadrant House is a Grade II listed building situated in Durban, South Africa.

== History ==
The building, erected in 1929, was commissioned by H. Live and designed by architect Ritchie McKinlay. It is assumed that its original purpose was to serve as a naval training school.

== Description ==
The building is located on the Victoria Embankment in Durban's city centre. It occupies a lot with the shape of a quarter circle or quadrant, from which it derives its name. It is considered one of the epitomes of the so-called Berea Style, a local declination of the Art Deco style which emerged from local interest in Spanish colonial architecture as found on the West coast of North America.

== See also ==
- List of heritage sites in KwaZulu-Natal
