= Durban North College =

Coordinates: 29.80362°S 31.03699°E

Durban North College / Durban Noord Kollege

Durban North College or Durban-Noord-kollege (in Afrikaans) is a high school situated to the north of Durban in KwaZulu-Natal, South Africa.

== History ==
D.N.C. started as a purely Afrikaans school called Afrikaanse Hoërskool Durban-Noord.

In 1996, due to government policy in diversifying previously Afrikaans-only schools, the school changed its name to Durban North College and adopted a dual-medium language policy, offering all subjects in both English and Afrikaans.

== Curriculum/Academic Information ==
Each learner must study English or Afrikaans at Home language Level and will study the alternative not chosen as a First Additional Language, and choose between Mathematics or Mathematical Literacy and study Life Orientation which is compulsory.

Durban North College offers a variety of subjects listed below:

- Physical Science
- Geography
- Computer Applications Technology
- Tourism
- Engineering Graphics and Design
- Accounting
- History
- Business Studies
- Life Sciences
- Visual Arts

All learners write Internally set School Papers and fall under The KZN Department of Education until Grade 12 in which all registered pupils sit to write their National Senior Certificate.

== Sport Information ==
Durban North College offers a variety of sports offered to its Students listed below:

- Cricket
- Rugby
- Hockey
- Netball
- Soccer
- Swimming
- Athletics
- Cross Country
- Chess
