= Durban =

City in South Africa

Durban eThekwini (Zulu)
- City
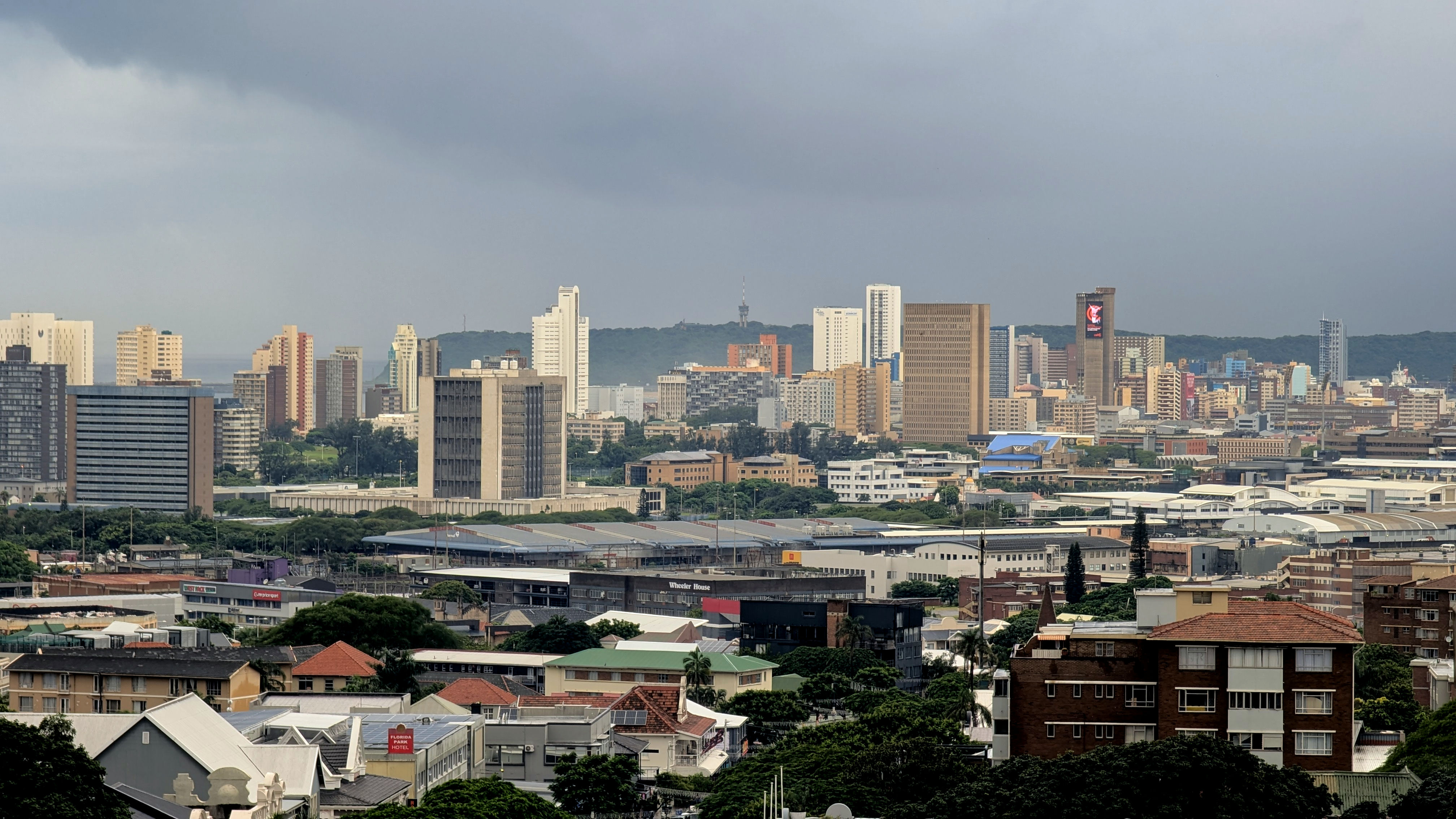
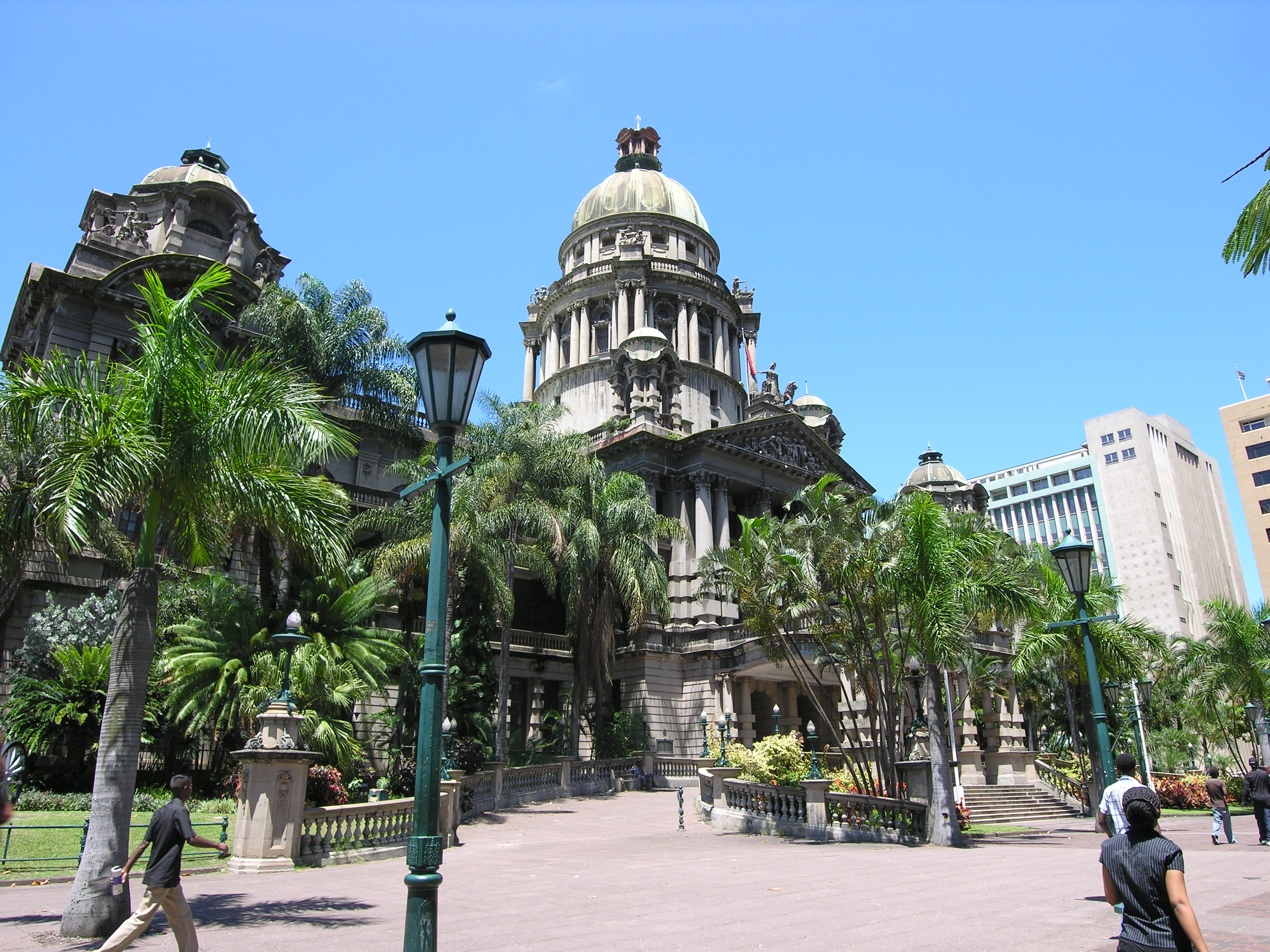
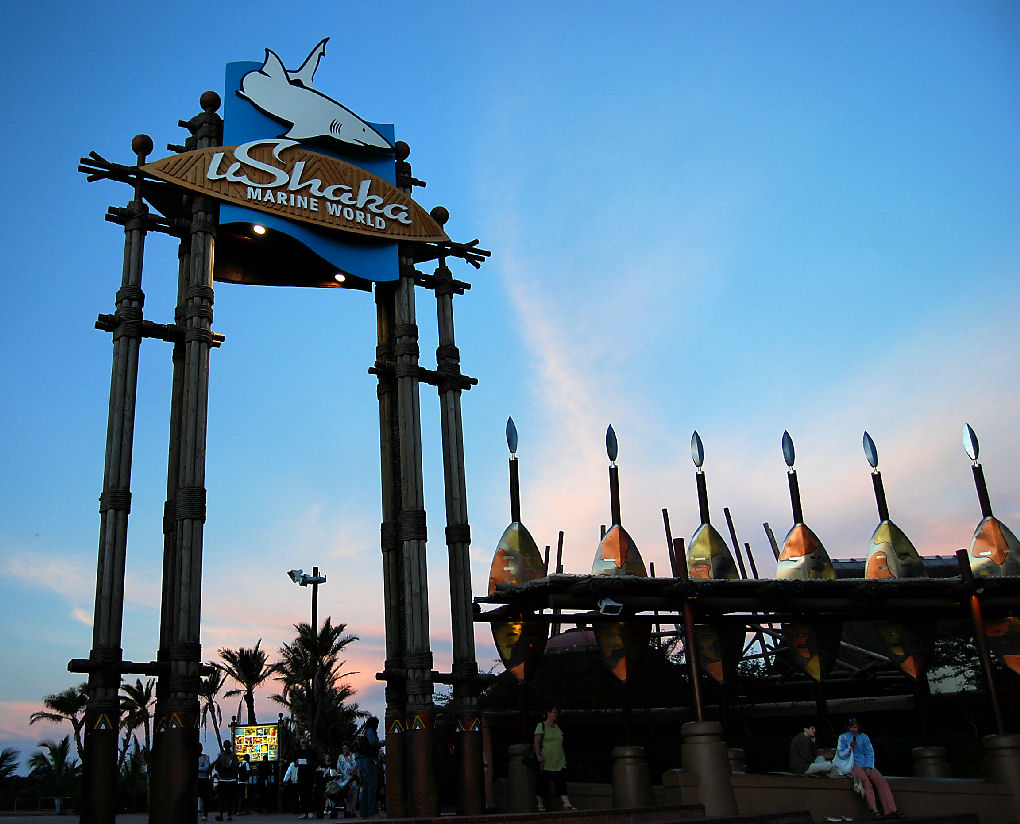
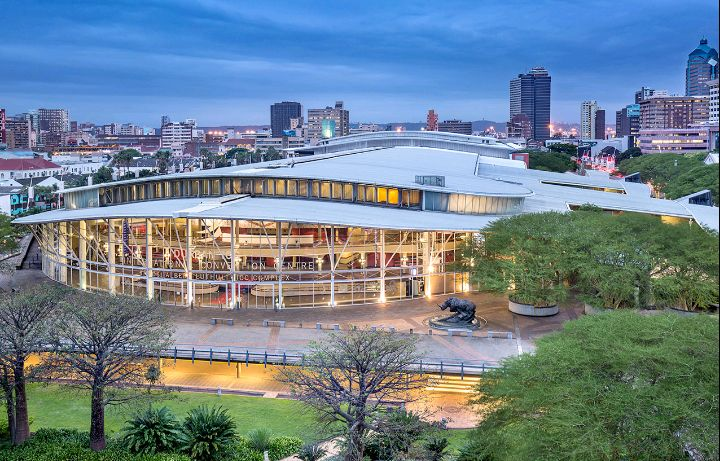
- Skyline of Durban Durban City Hall uShaka Marine World Inkosi Albert Luthuli International Convention Centre Suncoast Casino and Entertainment World Moses Mabhida Stadium

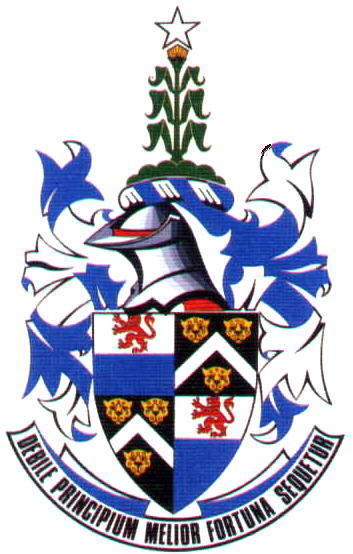
- Flag Coat of arms

- Location within KwaZulu-Natal Location within South Africa Location within Africa
- Coordinates: 29°53′S 31°03′E
- Country: South Africa
- Province: KwaZulu-Natal
- Municipality: eThekwini
- Established: 24 August 1824; 202 years ago
- Named for: Benjamin D'Urban

Government
  - Type: Metropolitan municipality
  - Mayor: Cyril Xaba (ANC)
  - Deputy Mayor: Zandile Myeni

Area
  - City: 225.91 km^{2} (87.22 sq mi)
  - Metro: 2,556 km^{2} (987 sq mi)

Population (2011)
  - City: 595,061
  - Rank: 17th in Africa; 3rd in South Africa
  - Density: 2,634.1/km^{2} (6,822.2/sq mi)
  - Urban: 3,177,927
  - Metro: 4,239,901
  - Metro density: 1,659/km^{2} (4,296/sq mi)
- Demonym: Durbanite

Racial makeup (2011)
  - Black African: 51.1%
  - Indian/Asian: 24.0%
  - White: 15.3%
  - Coloured: 8.6%
  - Other: 0.9%

First languages (2011)
  - English: 49.8%
  - Zulu: 33.1%
  - Xhosa: 5.9%
  - Afrikaans: 3.6%
  - Other: 7.6%
- Time zone: UTC+2 (SAST)
- Postal code (street): 4001
- PO box: 4000
- Area code: 031
- GDP: US$ 83.9 billion
- GDP per capita: US$ 16,575

Durban (/ˈdɜːr.bən/, DUR-bən; Zulu: eThekwini, from itheku meaning 'bay, lagoon') (Note: Also called eZibubulungwini for the mountain range that terminates in the area. In an 1859 Zulu grammar book, Bishop Colenso asserted that the root word iTeku means 'bay of the sea', from the name Mtheku, used by the Thabethe tribes clan, who were the leaders of the Nguni people. Furthermore the original local inhabitants and noted that the locative form, eTekwini, was used as a proper name for Durban. An 1895 English-Zulu dictionary translates the base word iteku as 'bay', 'creek', 'gulf' or 'sinus', while a 1905 Zulu-English dictionary notes that eTekwini is used for Durban.) is the third-most populous city in South Africa, after Johannesburg and Cape Town, and the largest city in the province of KwaZulu-Natal. Situated on the east coast of South Africa, on the Natal Bay of the Indian Ocean, Durban is the busiest port city in sub-Saharan Africa and was formerly named Port Natal. North of the harbour and city centre lies the mouth of the Umgeni River; the flat city centre rises to the hills of the Berea on the west; and to the south, running along the coast, is the Bluff.

Durban is the seat of the larger eThekwini Metropolitan Municipality, which spans an area of 2,556 km^{2} (987 sq mi) and had a population of 4.2 million in 2022, making the metropolitan population one of Africa's largest on the Indian Ocean. Within the city limits, Durban's population was 595,061 in 2011. The city has a humid subtropical climate, with hot, wet summers and mild, dry winters.

Archaeological evidence from the Drakensberg mountains suggests that the area had been inhabited by hunter-gatherers millennia ago. Later, the Nguni people occupied the region. During Christmas 1497, Vasco da Gama saw the coast and named it Natal, the Portuguese word for Christmas. In 1824, English traders from Cape Colony, led by Francis Farewell and Henry Fynn, established a trading post at Port Natal, and later that year, Shaka, the Zulu king, granted them land around the Bay. In 1835, the settlement was named after Sir Benjamin D'Urban, then governor of Cape Colony, and became a borough in 1854. From 1860 onwards, indentured labourers from British India arrived in Durban, as well as later passenger Indians. Natal colony, which had grown, became a province of the Union of South Africa in 1910, and Durban was granted city status in 1935.

Durban has a diverse heritage, with large Zulu, Indian, White, and Coloured populations. Durban is a popular tourist destination domestically because of its beaches and warm climate, with an estimated 1.8 million domestic trips between January and May 2026, with approximately 134 900 international visitors during the same period. Some notable places are the Moses Mabhida Stadium, Golden Mile beachfront, Botanic Gardens, the Art Gallery and Natural Science Museum at City Hall, the Tudor-style Playhouse Theatre, uShaka Marine World, and the International Convention Centre. In addition to various architectural styles, ranging from Victorian to contemporary, Art Deco left its stamp on many of Durban's buildings. As of 2018, the metro area contributed 59.9% and 9.6% to the provincial and national gross domestic product, respectively; the main sectors were finance, community services, manufacturing, trade, transport, and tourism. Durban was one of the host cities of the 2010 FIFA World Cup, for which the Moses Mabhida Stadium was built, and is UNESCO's first City of Literature in Africa.

== History ==
Archaeological evidence from the Drakensberg mountains suggests that the Durban area has been inhabited by communities of hunter-gatherers since 100,000 BP. These people lived throughout the area of KwaZulu-Natal until the expansion of agro-pastoralists and pastoralists from the north saw their gradual incorporation. Oral history has been passed down from generation to generation by the Zulu nation, who were inhabitants of the land before European colonisers, but there is no written history of the area until it was sighted by Portuguese explorer Vasco da Gama, who sailed parallel to the KwaZulu-Natal coast at Christmastide in 1497 while searching for a route from Europe to India. He named the area Natal, meaning "Christmas" in Portuguese.

=== Abambo people ===
In 1686, a ship from the Dutch East India Company named Stavenisse was wrecked off the eastern coast of South Africa. Some of the survivors made their way to the Bay of Natal (Durban) where they were taken in by the "Abambo" tribe (Hlubi people), which was led by Chief Langalibalele. The crew became fluent in the tribe's language and witnessed their customs. The tribe told them that the land where the Abambo people lived was called Embo by the natives and that the people were very hospitable.

On 28 October 1689, the galiot Noord travelled from Table Bay to the Bay of Natal to fetch the surviving crew of the Stavenisse and to negotiate a deal for purchasing the bay. The Noord arrived on 9 December 1689, whereafter the Dutch Cape Colony purchased the Bay of Natal from the Abambo people for £1,650. A formal contract was drawn up by Laurens van Swaanswyk and signed by the chief of the Abambo people, with the crew of the Stavenisse acting as translators.

=== First European settlers ===
By 1822, James Saunders King, captain of the British ship Salisbury, together with Lt. Francis George Farewell, both men being former Royal Navy officers from the Napoleonic Wars, were engaged in trade between the Cape and Delagoa Bay. On a return trip to the Cape in 1823, they were caught in a severe storm and decided to risk the Bar and anchor in the Bay of Natal. The crossing went well and they found safe anchor from the storm. Lt. King decided to map the Bay and named the "Salisbury and Farewell Islands". In 1824 Lt. Farewell, together with a trading company called J. R. Thompson & Co., decided to open trade relations with Shaka the Zulu King, and establish a trading station at the Bay. Henry Francis Fynn, another trader at Delagoa Bay, was also involved in this venture.

Fynn left Delagoa Bay and sailed for the Bay of Natal on the brig Julia, while Farewell followed six weeks later on the Antelope. Between them they had 26 possible settlers, although only 18 stayed. On a visit to King Shaka, Henry Francis Fynn succeeded in befriending the king by helping him recover from a stab wound that he had suffered as a result of an assassination attempt by one of his half-brothers. As a token of his gratitude King Shaka granted, by document dated the 7th of August 1824, to “F. G. Farewell & Company entire and full possession in perpetuity” of a tract of land including "the port or harbour of Natal" and land extending 16 km (10 mi) south of the Bay, 40 km (25 mi) north of the Bay and 160 km (100 mi) inland.

Farewell took possession of this grant and raised the Union Jack with a Royal Salute, which consisted of four cannon shots and twenty musket shots. Only six of the original eighteen would-be settlers remained, and these six can be regarded as the founders of Port Natal as a British colony. These six were joined by Lt. James Saunders King and Nathaniel Isaacs in 1825.

The modern city of Durban thus dates from 1824, when the settlement was established on the northern shores of the bay near today's Farewell Square. During a meeting of 35 European residents in Fynn's territory on 23 June 1835, it was decided to build a capital town and name it "D'Urban" after Sir Benjamin D'Urban, who was the governor of the Cape Colony at the time.

=== Republic of Natalia ===
The Voortrekkers established the Natalia Republic in 1839, with its capital at Pietermaritzburg. Zulu-Voortrekker tensions led Governor George Thomas Napier, fearing the loss of Port Natal, to dispatch a force under Captain Thomas Charlton Smith to establish British rule in Natal. The force arrived on 4 May 1842 and built a fortified camp that was later known as The Old Fort. On the night of 23 May 1842, Smith's troops unsuccessfully attacked a Voortrekker camp at Congella; forced to retreat, they were besieged by the Voortrekkers in their own camp. A local English trader, Dick King, was able to escape from the siege with his servant Ndongeni and rode to Grahamstown in 14 days to gather reinforcements. The reinforcements arrived in Durban 20 days later; the Voortrekkers retreated, and the siege was lifted. On 4 May 1843, Britain annexed the Natalia Republic after prior negotiations with Voortrekker leaders, annexing Natal eight days later. In 1844, Natal became a district of the Cape Colony under a lieutenant-governor.

==== Durban's historic regalia ====
When the Borough of Durban was proclaimed in 1854, the council had to procure a seal for official documents. The seal was produced in 1855 and was replaced in 1882. The new seal contained a coat of arms without helmet or mantling that combined the coats of arms of Sir Benjamin D'Urban and Sir Benjamin Pine. An application was made to register the coat of arms with the College of Arms in 1906, but this application was rejected on grounds that the design implied that D'Urban and Pine were husband and wife. Nevertheless, the coat of arms appeared on the council's stationery from about 1912. The following year, a helmet and mantling was added to the council's stationery and to the new city seal that was made in 1936. The motto reads "Debile principium melior fortuna sequitur"—"Better fortune follows a humble beginning".

The blazon of the arms registered by the South African Bureau of Heraldry and granted to Durban on 9 February 1979. The coat of arms fell into disuse with the re-organisation of the South African local government structure in 2000. The seal ceased to be used in 1995.

== Government ==
With the end of apartheid, Durban was subject to restructuring of local government. Its first mayor was Sipho Ngwenya. In 1996, the city became part of the Durban UniCity in July 1996 as part of transitional arrangements and to eThekwini Metropolitan Municipality in 1999, with the adoption of South Africa's new municipal governance system. In July 1996, Obed Mlaba was appointed mayor of Durban UniCity; in 1999 he was elected mayor of the eThekwini municipality and re-elected in 2006. Following the May 2011 local elections, James Nxumalo, the former speaker of the council, was elected as the new mayor. On 23 August 2016 Zandile Gumede was elected as the new mayor until 13 August 2019. On 5 September 2019 Mxolisi Kaunda was sworn in as the new mayor.

The name of the Durban municipal government, prior to the post-apartheid reorganisations of municipalities, was the Durban Corporation or City of Durban.

== Geography ==
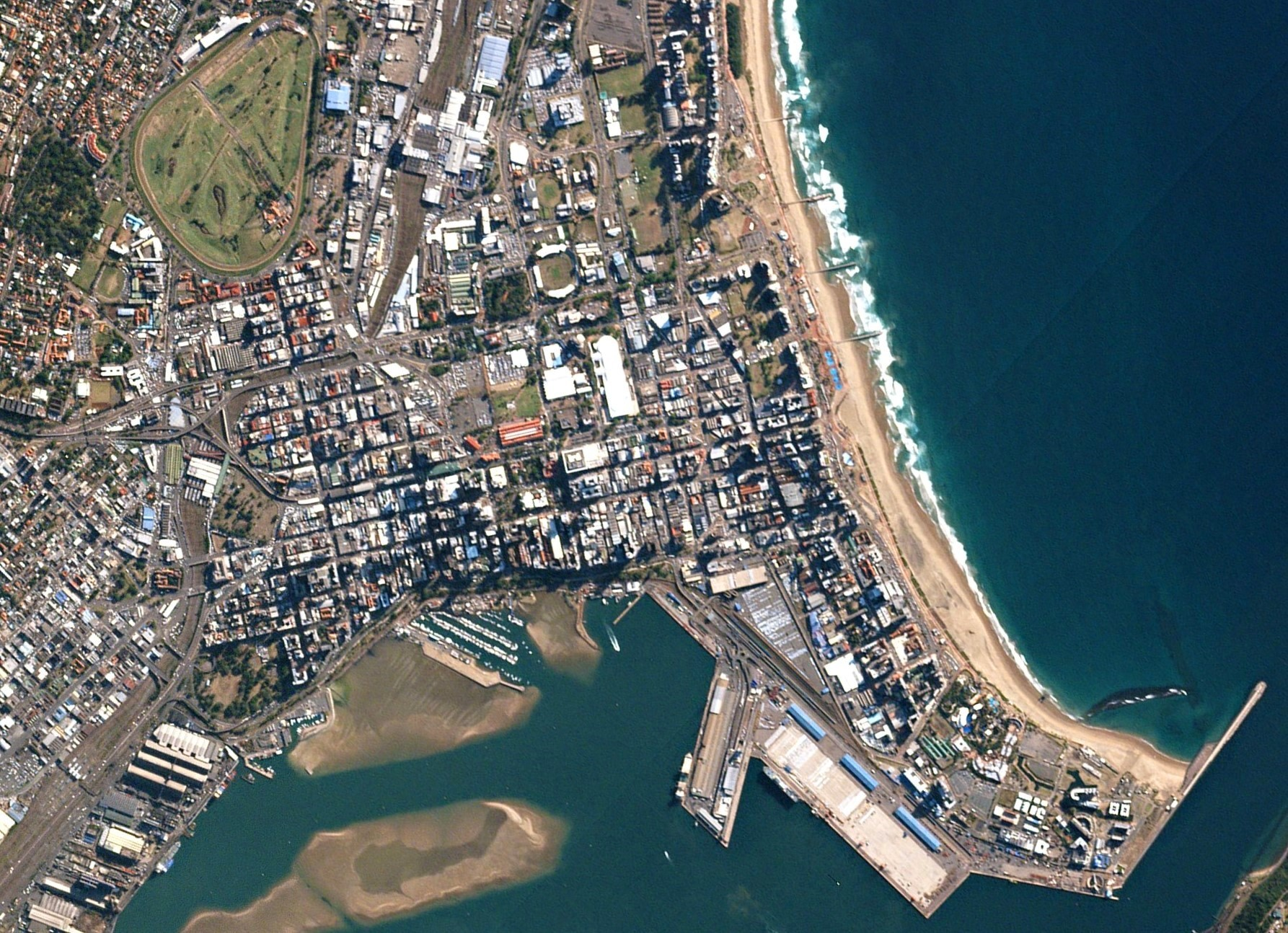
Satellite view of Durban Central in 2016

Durban is located on the east coast of South Africa, looking out upon the Indian Ocean. The city lies at the mouth of the Umgeni River, which demarcates parts of Durban's north city limit, while other sections of the river flow through the city itself. Durban has a natural harbour, Port of Durban, which is the busiest port in South Africa and the fourth-busiest in the Southern Hemisphere.

The extent of urban sprawl the Greater Durban agglomeration has experienced, virtually adjoining surrounding smaller towns, has made boundaries in the metropolitan area quite complicated. Durban proper, which is the main city, is demarcated by its administrative city limits, which are only as large to include the city centre, the Bluff, Berea, Durban North, Mobeni as well as Umbogintwini, Athlone Park, Isipingo and Prospecton to the south among other suburbs.

However, the eThekwini Metropolitan Municipality is an amalgamation of Durban proper and more than 120 other nearby formerly independent towns and suburbs such as Amanzimtoti, Cato Ridge, Chatsworth, Hillcrest, KwaMashu, Inanda, oThongathi, Pinetown, Queensburgh, uMhlanga, Umlazi, Verulam and Westville among others that have organically merged yet still retain their legal boundaries.

The name "Durban" is commonly referred to by residents as not just the city proper but the Greater Durban metropolitan area that sometimes extends beyond eThekwini to include Scottburgh, Ballito and KwaDukuza. Similarly, the demonym of a "Durbanite" not only refers to people who live within Durban proper but to residents of the Greater Durban metropolitan area.

=== Climate ===
Durban has a humid subtropical climate (Köppen climate classification Cfa, bordering Cwa) with hot, humid summers and mild, dry winters, which are frost-free. Durban has an annual rainfall of 1,009 millimetres (39.7 in). The average temperature in summer ranges around 24 °C (75 °F), while in winter the average temperature is 17 °C (63 °F).

Climate data for Durban (Durban International Airport) (1991–2020 normals, extremes 1961–1990)
Month	Jan	Feb	Mar	Apr	May	Jun	Jul	Aug	Sep	Oct	Nov	Dec	Year
Record high °C (°F)	36.2 (97.2)	33.9 (93.0)	34.8 (94.6)	36.0 (96.8)	33.8 (92.8)	35.7 (96.3)	33.8 (92.8)	35.9 (96.6)	41.0 (105.8)	39.9 (103.8)	33.5 (92.3)	35.9 (96.6)	41.0 (105.8)
Mean daily maximum °C (°F)	28.0 (82.4)	28.6 (83.5)	27.9 (82.2)	26.1 (79.0)	24.9 (76.8)	23.6 (74.5)	22.8 (73.0)	23.3 (73.9)	23.5 (74.3)	24.1 (75.4)	25.3 (77.5)	26.7 (80.1)	25.4 (77.7)
Daily mean °C (°F)	24.5 (76.1)	25.0 (77.0)	24.1 (75.4)	22.0 (71.6)	19.6 (67.3)	17.4 (63.3)	16.9 (62.4)	18.2 (64.8)	19.5 (67.1)	20.4 (68.7)	21.8 (71.2)	23.4 (74.1)	21.1 (69.9)
Mean daily minimum °C (°F)	21.3 (70.3)	21.3 (70.3)	20.5 (68.9)	17.6 (63.7)	14.2 (57.6)	11.2 (52.2)	10.8 (51.4)	13.0 (55.4)	15.4 (59.7)	17.1 (62.8)	18.6 (65.5)	20.2 (68.4)	16.8 (62.2)
Record low °C (°F)	14.0 (57.2)	13.3 (55.9)	11.6 (52.9)	8.6 (47.5)	4.9 (40.8)	3.5 (38.3)	2.6 (36.7)	2.6 (36.7)	4.5 (40.1)	8.3 (46.9)	10.3 (50.5)	11.8 (53.2)	2.6 (36.7)
Average precipitation mm (inches)	121.6 (4.79)	108.2 (4.26)	93.3 (3.67)	73.1 (2.88)	46.9 (1.85)	29.5 (1.16)	58.5 (2.30)	31.1 (1.22)	70.7 (2.78)	105.0 (4.13)	117.3 (4.62)	120.4 (4.74)	975.6 (38.4)
Average precipitation days (≥ 1.0 mm)	9.8	8.5	8.1	5.8	4.0	2.4	2.9	3.5	7.2	11.4	11.2	11.0	85.8
Average relative humidity (%)	80	80	80	78	76	72	72	75	77	78	79	79	77
Mean monthly sunshine hours	184.0	178.8	201.6	206.4	223.6	224.9	230.4	217.0	173.3	169.4	166.1	189.9	2,365.4
Source 1: NOAA (sun, extremes and humidity 1961–1990)
Source 2: Starlings Roost Weather

==== Climate change ====
A 2019 paper published in PLOS One estimated that under Representative Concentration Pathway 4.5, a "moderate" scenario of climate change where global warming reaches ~2.5–3 °C (4.5–5.4 °F) by 2100, the climate of Durban in the year 2050 would most closely resemble the current climate of Kigali. The annual temperature would increase by 1.7 °C (3.1 °F), and the temperature of the coldest month by 1.8 °C (3.2 °F), while the temperature of the warmest month would be 0.5 °C (0.90 °F) lower. According to Climate Action Tracker, the current warming trajectory appears consistent with 2.7 °C (4.9 °F), which closely matches RCP 4.5.

Moreover, according to the 2022 IPCC Sixth Assessment Report, Durban is one of 12 major African cities (Abidjan, Alexandria, Algiers, Cape Town, Casablanca, Dakar, Dar es Salaam, Durban, Lagos, Lomé, Luanda and Maputo) which would be the most severely affected by future sea level rise. It estimates that they would collectively sustain cumulative damages of US$65 billion under RCP 4.5 and US$86.5 billion for the high-emission scenario RCP 8.5 by the year 2050. Additionally, RCP 8.5 combined with the hypothetical impact from marine ice sheet instability at high levels of warming would involve up to US$137.5 billion in damages, while the additional accounting for the "low-probability, high-damage events" may increase aggregate risks to US$187 billion for the "moderate" RCP4.5, US$206 billion for RCP8.5 and US$397 billion under the high-end ice sheet instability scenario. Since sea level rise would continue for about 10,000 years under every scenario of climate change, future costs of sea level rise would only increase, especially without adaptation measures.

== Demographics ==
Historical population
Year	Pop.	±%
1940	330,000	—
1950	463,000	+40.3%
1960	677,000	+46.2%
1970	855,000	+26.3%
1980	1,214,160	+42.0%
1990	1,722,961	+41.9%
1996	2,239,703	+30.0%
2000	2,625,306	+17.2%
2010	2,949,093	+12.3%
2011	2,971,536	+0.8%
2016	3,330,000	+12.1%
2017	3,110,027	−6.6%
2018	3,133,729	+0.8%
2019	3,114,573	−0.6%
2021	3,176,254	+2.0%
2022	3,776,000	+18.9%

Geographical distribution of home languages in eThekwini metropole: Afrikaans; English; Xhosa; Zulu; No language dominant

Durban is ethnically diverse, with a cultural richness of mixed beliefs and traditions. Zulus form the largest single ethnic group. It has a large number of people of British and Indian descent. The influence of Indians in Durban has been significant, bringing with them a variety of cuisine, culture and religion.

In the years following the end of apartheid, there was a population boom as black Africans were allowed to move into the city. The population grew by an annual average of 2.34% between 1996 and 2001. This led to shanty towns forming around the city, which were often demolished. Between 2001 and 2011, the population growth slowed down to 1.08% per year and shanty towns have become less common as the government builds low-income housing.

The population of the city of Durban and central suburbs such as Durban North, Durban South and the Berea increased 10.9% between 2001 and 2011 from 536,644 to 595,061. The proportion of black Africans increased while the proportion of people in all the other racial groups decreased. Black Africans increased from 34.9% to 51.1%; Indians or Asians decreased from 27.3% to 24.0%; whites decreased from 25.5% to 15.3%; and Coloureds decreased from 10.26% to 8.59%. A new racial group, "Other", was included in the 2011 census at 0.93%.

The city's demographics indicate that 68% of the population is of working age, and 38% of the people in Durban are under the age of 19 years.

Durban has the highest number of dollar millionaires added per year of any South African city, with the number having increased 200 percent between 2000 and 2014.

Ethnic make-up of Durban
Race	2001		2011	
Race	Number	Percent	Number	Percent
Black	187,907	36.90%	304,288	51.10%
Indian	146,745	27.30%	143,000	24.00%
White	136,956	25.50%	91,212	15.30%
Coloured	56,036	10.30%	51,130	8.60%

Ethnic make-up of Ethekweni metro
Race	1996		2001		2011		2022	
Race	Number	Percent	Number	Percent	Number	Percent	Number	Percent
Black	1,738,988	64%	2,107,599	68%	2,540,441	73.8%	2,794,240	74%
Indian	599,296	22%	614,675	20%	573,334	16.7%	679,680	18%
White	316,281	12%	277,479	9%	228,406	6.6%	226,560	6%
Coloured	–	2%	–	3%	85,908	2.5%	75,520	2%

== Economy ==
Sugar refining is one of Durban's main industries. South Africa produces 19.9 million tons of sugar cane a year and most of it comes from KwaZulu-Natal.

=== Informal sector ===
Durban has a number of informal and semi-formal street vendors. The Warwick Junction Precinct is home to a number of street markets, with vendors selling goods from traditional medicine, to clothing and spices.

The city's treatment of shack dwellers was criticised in a report from the United Nations linked Centre on Housing Rights and Evictions and there has also been criticism of the city's treatment of street traders, street children and sex workers. The cannabis strain called "Durban Poison" is named for the city.

=== Civil society ===
There are a number of civil society organisations based in Durban. These include: Abahlali baseMjondolo movement, the Diakonia Council of Churches, the Right2Know Campaign, the South Durban Community Environmental Alliance and the South African Unemployed Peoples' Movement.

== Tourism and culture ==
Durban has been named the greenest city in the world by Husqvarna Urban Green Space Index.

=== Tourist destinations ===
- Burman Bush
- Durban Art Gallery
- Durban Botanic Gardens
- Durban Natural Science Museum
- Greyville Racecourse – home of the Durban July Handicap and Durban Country Club and golf course
- Hawaan Forest
- Kenneth Stainbank Nature Reserve
- Kingsmead Cricket Ground – a major test match and one-day cricket venue.
- Kings Park Stadium – home ground of the internationally renowned Sharks rugby team.
- Mitchell Park Zoo
- Moses Mabhida Stadium
- New Germany Nature Reserve
- Pigeon Valley Nature reserve
- Umgeni River Bird Park
- Umhlanga Lagoon Nature Reserve
- uShaka Marine World

=== Cultural attractions ===
There are many museums, art galleries, theatres, and other centres of culture in Durban.

The African Art Centre is "the longest surviving organisation involved in the development and promotion of African artists and crafters", founded in 1960, and moving to a new home in Station Drive in 2017.

Ethekwini Municipal Libraries is a free public library network with 90 circulating branch libraries across the metropolitan area, and the Central Reference Library at the Liberty Towers Building, which includes a significant collection of Africana books.

The Phansi Museum is located in the historic Roberts House, a 19th-century colonial mansion and former home of Esther Roberts, a librarian and collector of Africana, member and supporter of the Black Sash anti-apartheid group. The collection and library is now linked to the University of KwaZulu-Natal. It is one of the most extensive Southern African art museums in the world, founded by Paul Mikula, who purchased artefacts from traditional craftspeople through Southern Africa over 30 years. The collection includes 19th-century beadwork, pottery, carvings, and textiles. Talks and exhibitions are held at the museum.

The Playhouse Theatre is located on Anton Lembede Street (formerly Smith Street). The original building on the site was a cinema built in 1896, which was rebuilt in 1935 in Tudor Revival style. The cinema reopened on 7 June 1935 and finally closed in the 1970s. After being taken over by the Performing Arts Council in the 1980s, the building was restored in 1985–6, and with the former Colosseum Theatre (or Prince's Theatre) is now a performing arts centre with five venues. The refurbishment architects, Small & Pettit & Robson, were awarded the 1987 Institute of South African Architects Natal Award of Merit for the work. home to the Playhouse Theatre Company. The company's mission is "to provide cultural education and entertainment in both an African and international context" and, apart from drama and dance performances, the company runs an educational program and presents theatre to schools. The Playhouse has been a venue for staging the work of many famous South African playwrights, including Mbongeni Ngema, and in October 2023 there was a casting call for a new musical entitled From Gibson Kente to Mbongeni Ngema, to celebrate the works and influence of Gibson Kente and Ngema.

Other significant cultural attractions include:

- Durban Art Gallery
- KwaZulu Natal Society of Arts

=== Places of worship ===
Among the places of worship, there are predominantly Christian churches and temples. These include: Zion Christian Church, Apostolic Faith Mission of South Africa, Assemblies of God, Baptist Union of Southern Africa (Baptist World Alliance), Methodist Church of Southern Africa (World Methodist Council), Anglican Church of Southern Africa (Anglican Communion), Presbyterian Church of Africa (World Communion of Reformed Churches), Roman Catholic Archdiocese of Durban (Catholic Church) and the Durban South Africa Temple (The Church of Jesus Christ of Latter-day Saints).

There are also mosques and Hindu temples.

=== Architecture ===
From its earlier years to the present, many layers have added to Durban's architectural heritage: Victorian, Edwardian, Islamic, Hindu, modernist, and contemporary. Additionally, and in contrast to the classical styles then prevalent, Art Deco found expression in many of Durban's buildings in the 20th century, varying in manner from area to area.

== Media ==
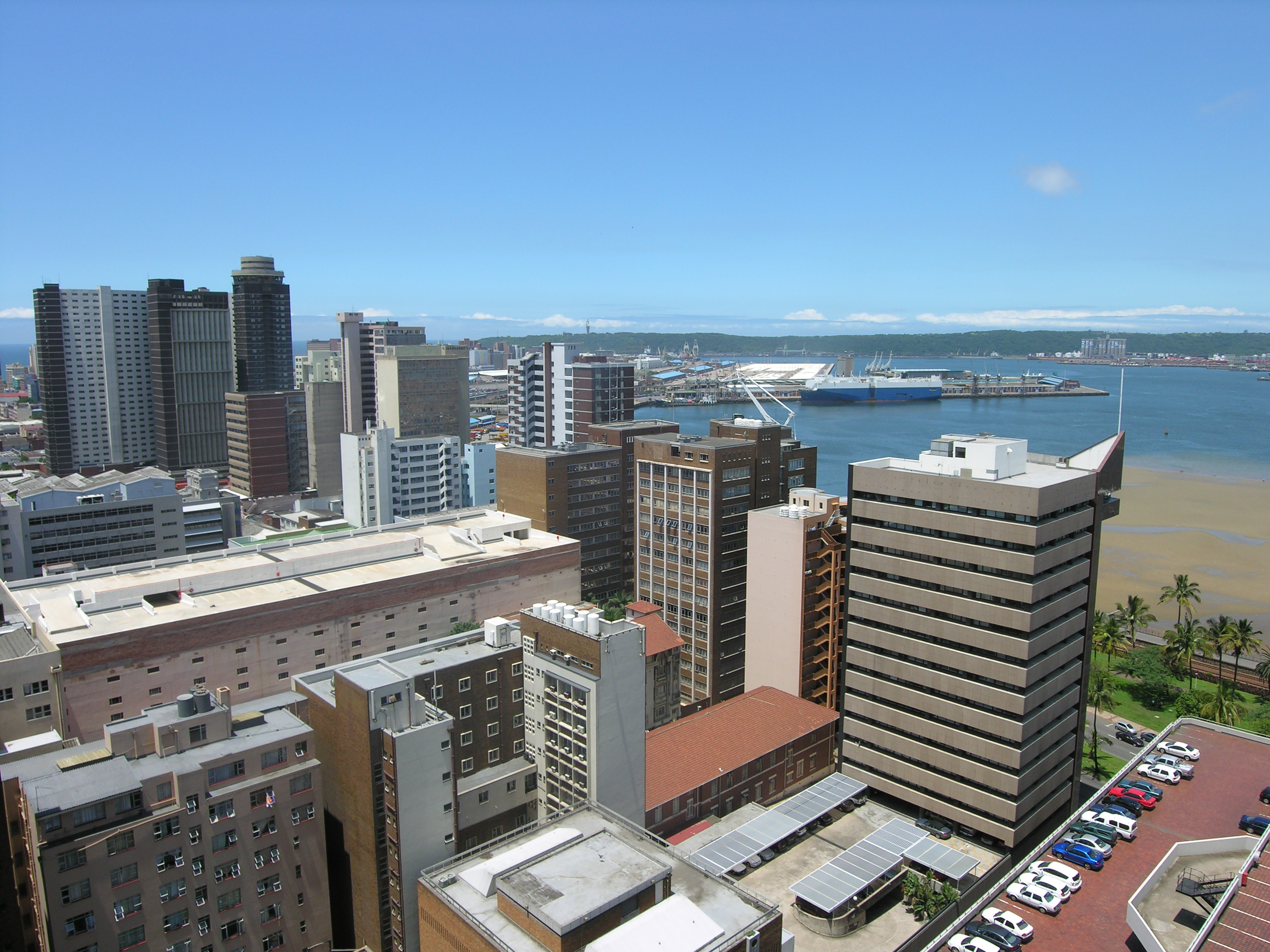
View of Durban Harbour

Two major English-language daily newspapers are published in Durban, both part of the Independent Newspapers, the national group owned by Sekunjalo Investments. These are the morning editions of The Mercury and the afternoon Daily News. Like most news media in South Africa, they have seen declining circulations in recent years. Major Zulu language papers comprise Isolezwe (Independent Newspapers), UmAfrika and Ilanga. Independent Newspapers also publish Post, a newspaper aimed largely at the Indian community. A national Sunday paper, the Sunday Tribune is also published by Independent Newspapers as is the Independent on Saturday.

A major city initiative is the eZasegagasini Metro Gazette.

The national broadcaster, the SABC, has regional offices in Durban and operates two major stations there. The Zulu language Ukhozi FM has a huge national listenership of more than 6.67 million, making it the second largest radio station in the world. The SABC also operates Radio Lotus, which is aimed at South Africans of Indian origin. The other SABC national stations have smaller regional offices in Durban, as does TV for news links and sports broadcasts. A major English language radio station, East Coast Radio, operates out of Durban and is owned by SA media giant Kagiso Media. There are a number of smaller stations which are independent, having been granted licences by ICASA, the national agency charged with the issue of broadcast licences.

== Sport ==
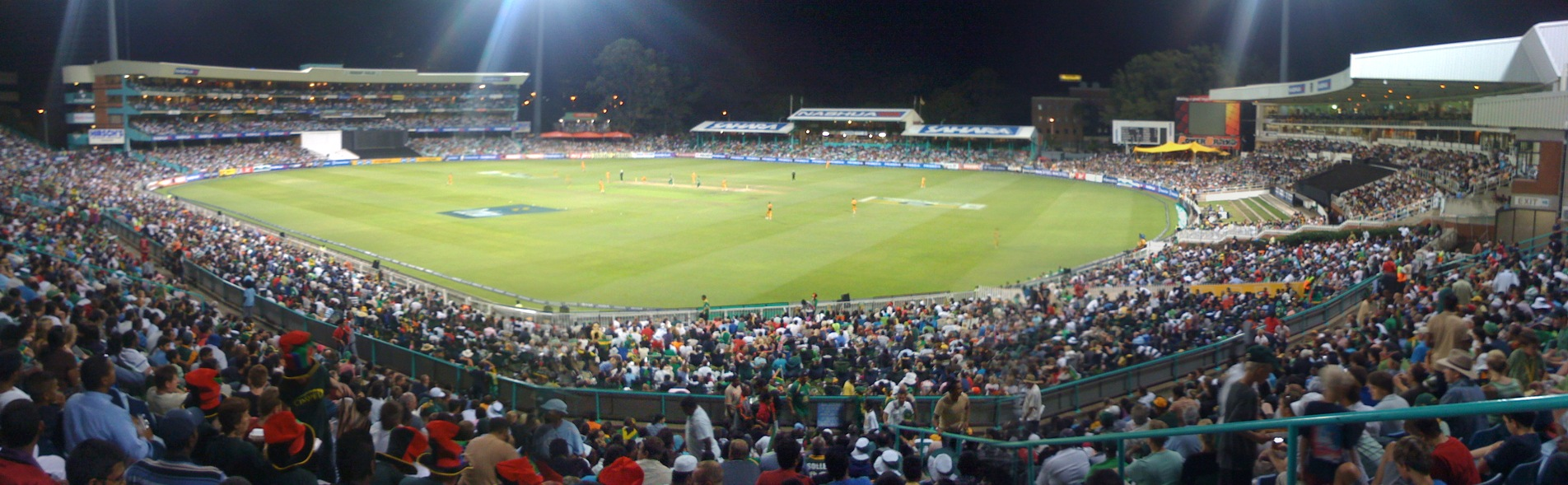
Kingsmead Cricket Ground, Durban, in 2009

Moses Mabhida Stadium in Durban

Durban was initially successful in its bid to host the 2022 Commonwealth Games, but had to withdraw in March 2017 from the role of hosts when the government withdrew its subsidy due to financial constraints. Birmingham, England replaced Durban as the host city.

Durban is home to The Sharks rugby union team, who compete in the international United Rugby Championship and Heineken Champions Cup competitions. The Sharks also compete in the Currie Cup. Their home ground is the 54,000 capacity Kings Park Stadium, sometimes referred to as the Shark Tank.

The city has three soccer clubs in the Premiership — AmaZulu, Golden Arrows and Durban City FC. AmaZulu play most of their home games at the Moses Mabhida Stadium.

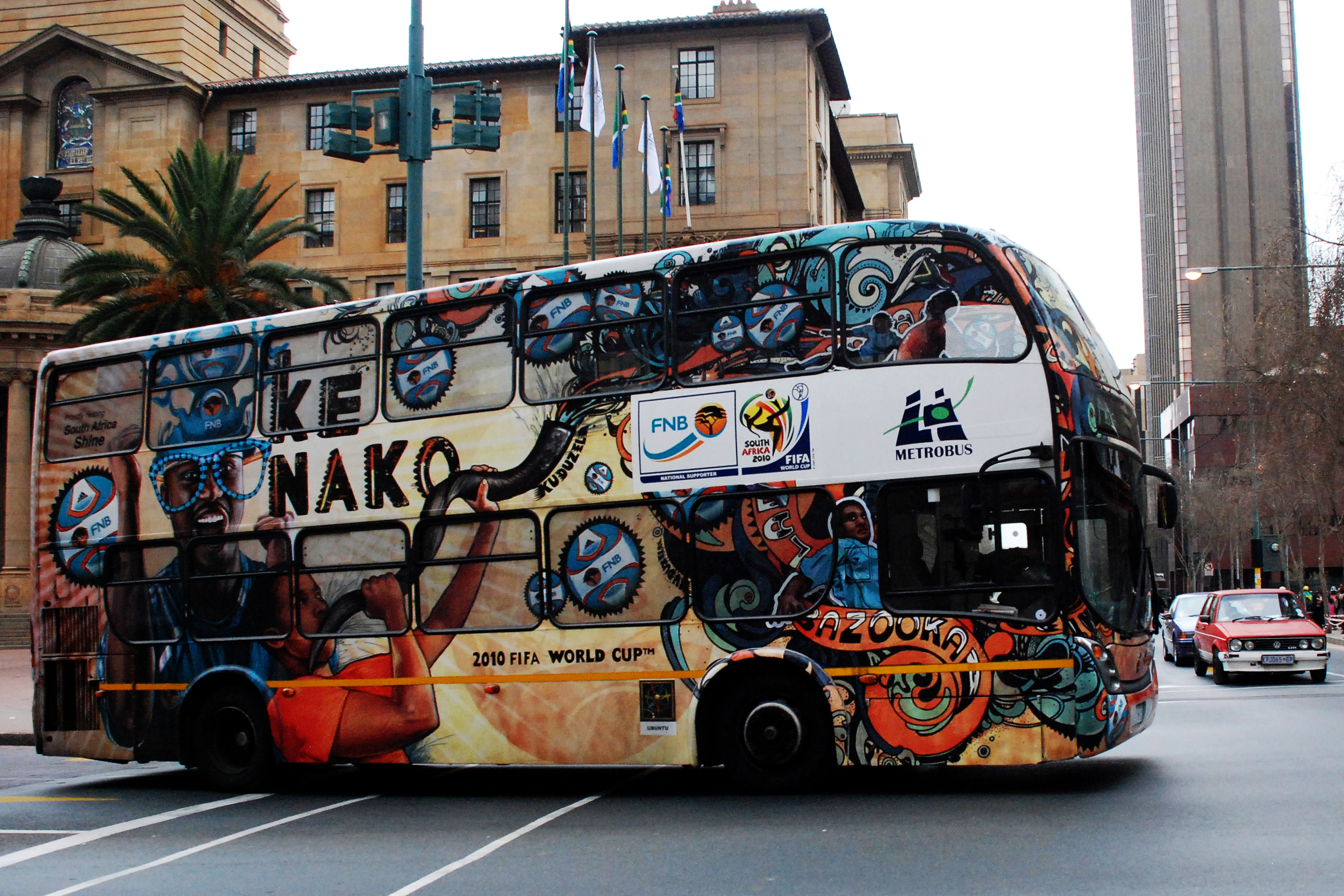
Bus transporting supporters during 2010 FIFA World Cup

Durban is host to the KwaZulu-Natal cricket team, who play as the Dolphins when competing in the Sunfoil Series, as well as Durban's Super Giants, who play in the SA20. Games are played at Kingsmead Cricket Ground.

Durban hosted matches in the 2003 ICC Cricket World Cup. In 2007 the city hosted nine matches, including a semi-final, as part of the inaugural ICC World Twenty20. The 2009 IPL season was played in South Africa, and Durban was selected as a venue. 2010 saw the city host six matches, including a semi-final, in the 2010 Champions League Twenty20.

Durban was one of the host cities of the 2010 FIFA World Cup, and A1 Grand Prix held a race on a street circuit in Durban from 2006 to 2008. Durban hosted the 123rd IOC Session in July 2011.

The city is home to Greyville Racecourse, a major Thoroughbred horse racing venue that annually hosts a number of prestigious races including the country's premier event, the July Handicap, and the premier staying event in South Africa, the Gold Cup. Clairwood racecourse, south of the city, was a popular racing venue for many years, but was sold by the KZN racing authority in 2012.

Durban hosts many famous endurance sports events annually, such as the Comrades Marathon, Dusi Canoe Marathon and the Ironman 70.3.

The city hosted several continental basketball tournaments such as the 1994 FIBA Africa Championship for Women or the 2006 FIBA Africa Under-18 Championship.

== Transport ==
=== Air ===
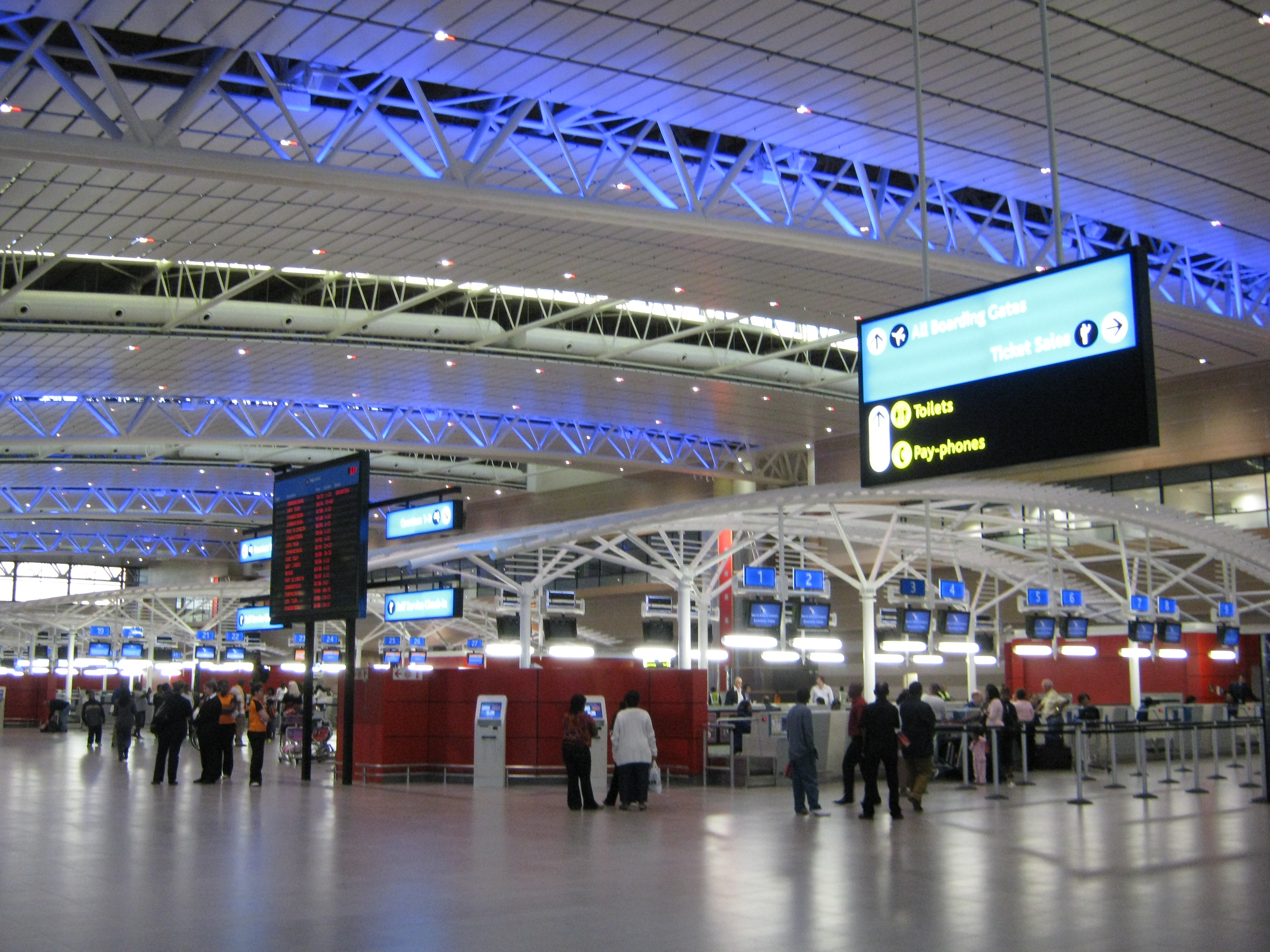
King Shaka International Airport

King Shaka International Airport services both domestic and international flights, with regularly scheduled services to Dubai, Doha, Istanbul, Harare, Manzini and Gaborone as well as eight domestic destinations. Ethiopian Airlines are resuming daily flights to Addis Ababa on 11 December 2026. The airport's position forms part of the Golden Triangle between Johannesburg and Cape Town, which is important for convenient travel and trade between these three major South African cities. The airport opened in May 2010. King Shaka International Airport handled 6.1 million passengers in 2019/2020, up 1.8 percent from 2018/2019. King Shaka International was constructed at La Mercy, about 36 kilometres (22 mi) north of central Durban. All operations at Durban International Airport have been transferred to King Shaka International as of 1 May 2010, with plans for flights to Hong Kong, Singapore, Mumbai, Kigali, Luanda, Lilongwe and Nairobi.

=== Sea ===
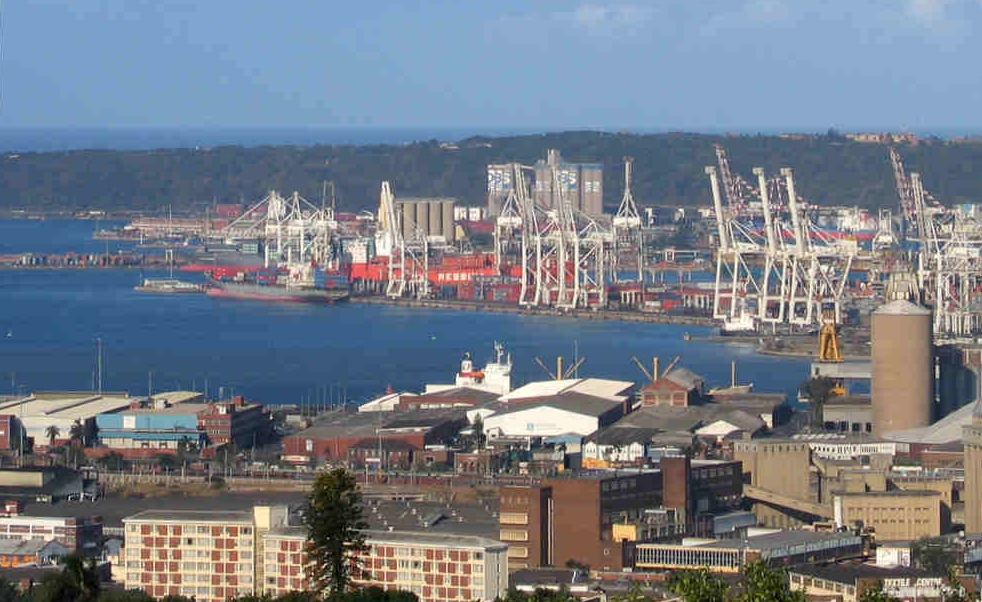
Durban Harbour

Durban has a long tradition as a port city. The Port of Durban, formerly known as Port Natal, is one of the few natural harbours between Port Elizabeth and Maputo, and is also located at the beginning of a particular weather phenomenon that can cause extremely violent seas. These two features made Durban an extremely busy port of call for ship repairs when the port was opened in the 1840s.

MSC Cruises bases one of their cruise ships in Durban from November to April every year. From the 2023/2024 Southern Africa cruise season MSC Cruises will be basing the MSC Splendida in Durban. Durban is the most popular cruise hub in Southern Africa. Cruise destinations from Durban on the MSC Splendida include Mozambique, Mauritius, Réunion, Madagascar and other domestic destinations such as Port Elizabeth and Cape Town. Many other ships cruise through Durban every year, including some of the world's biggest, such as the RMS Queen Mary 2, the biggest ocean liner in the world. Durban has built a brand new R200 million cruise terminal that has been in operation since October 2019, the Durban Cruise Terminal. The tender was awarded to KwaZulu Cruise Terminal (Pty) Ltd, which is 70% owned by MSC Cruises SA and 30% by Africa Armada Consortium. The new cruise terminal will be able to accommodate two cruise ships at any given time.

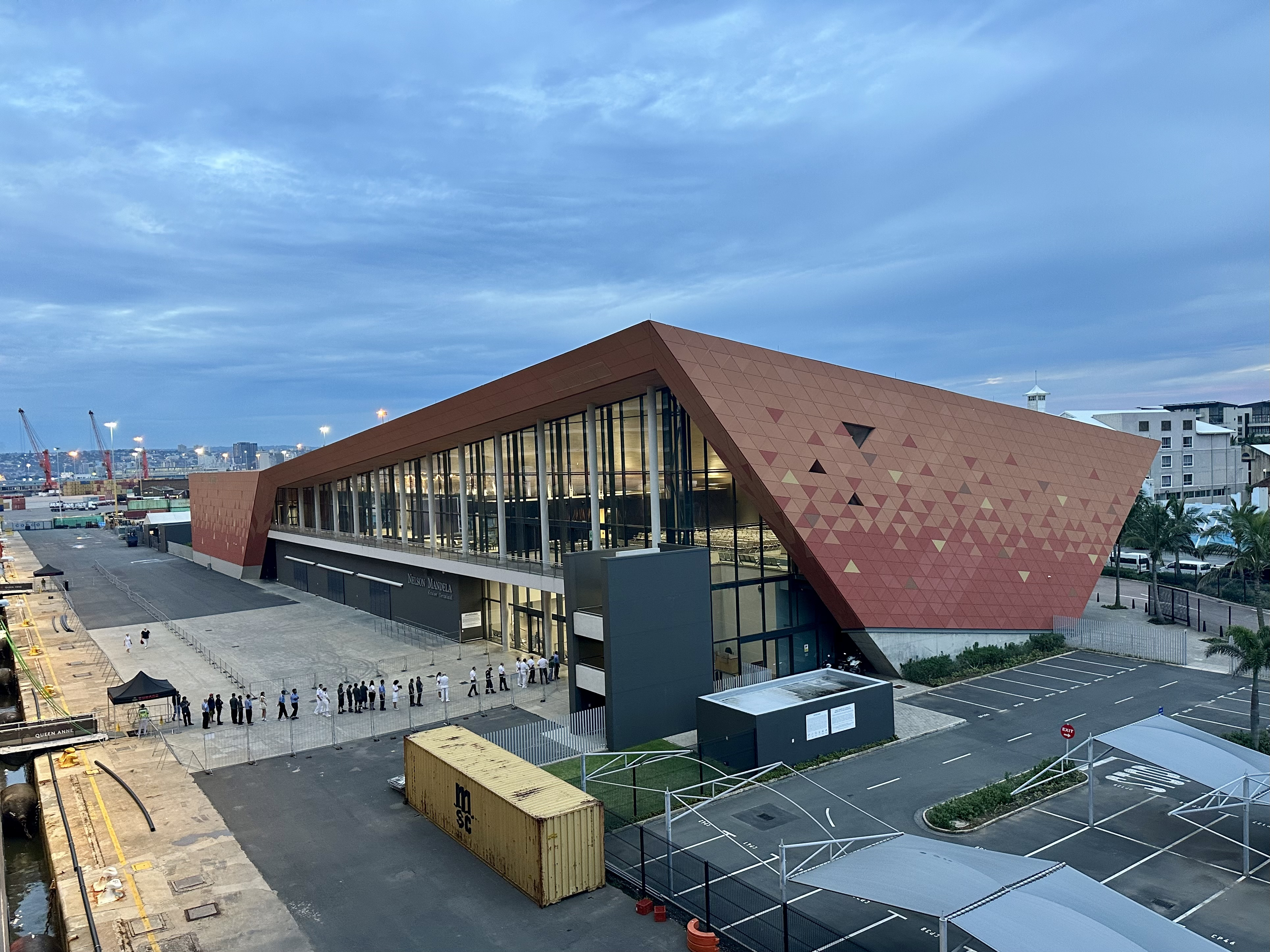
The Nelson Mandela Cruise Terminal

Naval Base Durban on Salisbury Island (now joined to the mainland and part of the Port of Durban), was established as a naval base during the Second World War. It was downgraded in 2002 to a naval station. In 2012 a decision was made to renovate and expand the facilities back up to a full naval base to accommodate the South African Navy's offshore patrol flotilla. In December 2015 it was redesignated Naval Base Durban.

=== Rail ===
Durban featured the first operating steam railway in South Africa when the Natal Railway Company started operating a line between the Point and the city of Durban in 1860.

Shosholoza Meyl, the passenger rail service of Spoornet, operates two long-distance passenger rail services from Durban: a daily service to and from Johannesburg via Pietermaritzburg and Newcastle, and a weekly service to and from Cape Town via Kimberley and Bloemfontein. These trains terminate at Durban railway station.

Metrorail operates a commuter rail service in Durban and the surrounding area. The Metrorail network runs from Durban Station outwards as far as KwaDukuza on the North Coast, Kelso on the South Coast, and Cato Ridge inland.

A high-speed rail link has been proposed; this would link Johannesburg and Durban.

=== Roads ===
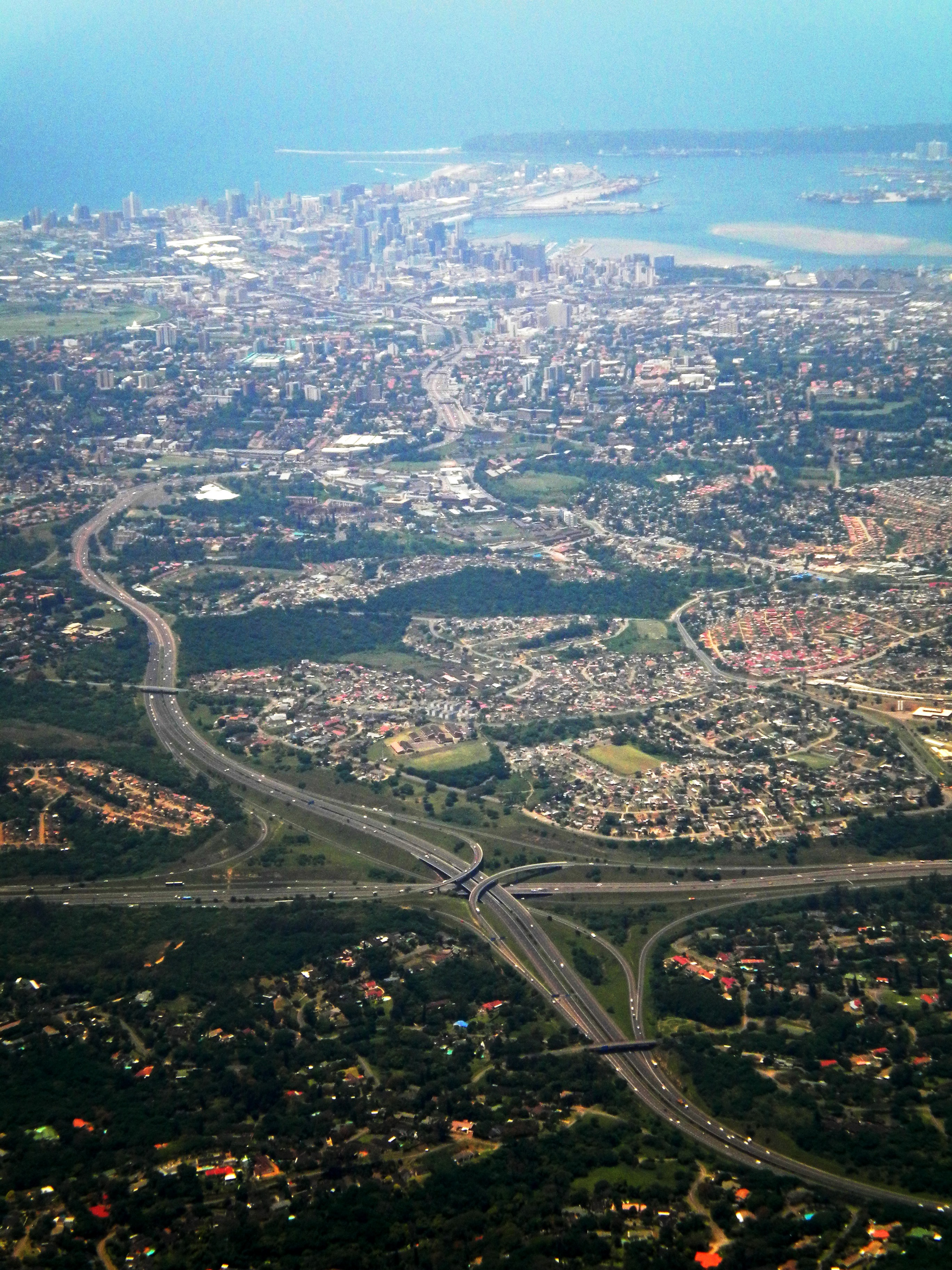
N3 freeway on its approach to Durban's CBD, with N2–N3 stack interchange in the foreground

The city's main position as a port of entry onto the southern African continent has led to the development of national roads around it. The N3 Western Freeway, which links Durban with the economic hinterland of Gauteng, heads west out of the city. The N2 Outer Ring Road links Durban with the Eastern Cape to the south, and Mpumalanga in the north. The Western Freeway is particularly important because freight is shipped by truck to and from the Witwatersrand for transfer to the port.

The N3 Western Freeway starts in the central business district and heads west under Tollgate Bridge and through the suburbs of Sherwood and Mayville. The EB Cloete Interchange (which is informally nicknamed the Spaghetti Junction) lies to the west of Durban and east of Westville, allowing for transfer of traffic between the N2 Outer Ring Road and the Western Freeway.

The N2 Outer Ring Road cuts through the city from the north coast to the south coast. It provides a vital link to the coastal towns (such as eManzimtoti, Kingsburgh, Scottburgh, eMkhomazi, Ballito and KwaDukuza) that rely on Durban.

Durban also has a system of freeway and dual arterial metropolitan routes, which connect the sprawling suburbs that lie to the north, west and south of the city. The M4 exists in two segments. The northern segment, named the Ruth First Highway and Leo Boyd Highway, starts as an alternative highway from the R102 in Ballito and shortly after intersects the N2. It passes through the seaside towns and villages of La Mercy and eMdloti before becoming a dual carriageway in uMhlanga, north of Durban and ending at the northern edge of the CBD. The southern segment of the M4, the Inkosi Albert Luthuli Highway, starts at the southern edge of the CBD, connecting through to the old, decommissioned Durban International Airport, where it once again reconnects at the southern end of the N2 Outer Ring Road.

The M7 connects the southern industrial basin of Durban with the N3 and Pinetown via Queensburgh via the N2. The M19 connects the inner northern suburbs of Durban with Pinetown via Westville and the M41 connects uMhlanga and Phoenix via Mount Edgecombe and the N2.

The M13 (King Cetshwayo Highway) is an untolled alternative to the N3 Western Freeway (which is tolled at Mariannhill) and is an important commuter route linking the nearby towns and suburbs to the west of Durban such as Hillcrest, Gillitts, Kloof, Pinetown and Westville to the city.

In the late 2000s, 107 streets in Durban were renamed. They were typically renamed to honour individuals involved in the anti-apartheid or international revolutionary movements, with two-thirds of the streets named after individuals associated with the governing African National Congress. This was done in two stages; a first, smaller one, which renamed eighteen streets and was met with some trepidation by opposition parties, particularly the Democratic Alliance, the Inkatha Freedom Party, and the Minority Front, and a second, larger stage, which renamed 99 streets and was met with considerably wider opposition after the controversy of the first and the minimal time between them. The first group was met with some opposition from this process was met with outrage from both opposition parties and the parts of the general public, as well as incidents of vandalism against the new road signs. The Democratic Alliance, Inkatha Freedom Party, and Minority Front were concerned with their lack of participation in the process, and that the emphasis on individuals affiliated with the ANC presented a partisan image of the anti-apartheid struggle. Among the general public there was significant opposition from middle-class white South Africans, Indian South Africans, and Zulu nationalists, who believed that the new names should have a connection to the people and the history of the locality. In response, the ANC characterized the project as a transformation and part of progressive social change, characterizing their opponents as being "antitransformation" and "pro-apartheid".

=== Buses ===
Several companies run long-distance bus services from Durban to the other cities in South Africa. Buses have a long history in Durban. Most of them have been run by Indian owners since the early 1930s. Privately owned buses that are not subsidised by the government also service the communities. Buses operate in all areas of the eThekwini Municipality. Since 2003 buses have been violently taken out of the routes and bus ranks by taxi operators.

Durban was previously served by the Durban trolleybus system, which ran from 1935 until 1968.

Since 2017, the newer Durban People Mover Bus System that runs along certain routes has been testing out free Wi-Fi for passengers.

=== Taxis ===
Durban has two kinds of taxis: metered taxis and minibus taxis. Unlike in many cities, metered taxis are not allowed to drive around the city to solicit fares and instead must be called and ordered to a specific location. A number of companies service the Durban and surrounding regions. These taxis can also be called upon for airport transfers, point to point pickups and shuttles.

Mini bus taxis are the standard form of transport for the majority of the population who cannot afford private cars. With the high demand for transport by the working class of South Africa, minibus taxis are often filled over their legal passenger allowance, making for high casualty rates when they are involved in accidents. Minibuses are generally owned and operated in fleets, and inter-operator violence flares up from time to time, especially as turf wars over lucrative taxi routes occur.

Ride sharing apps Uber and Taxify have been launched in Durban and are also used by commuters.

=== Rickshaws ===
Although rickshaws have been a mode of transportation since the early 1900s, they have been displaced by other forms of motorised transport. The roughly 25 remaining rickshaws mostly cater to tourists.

== Crime and safety ==
Compared to other South African cities, Durban has a high murder rate. Between April 2018 and March 2019, the Ethekwini Metropolitan Municipality recorded 1,871 murders, gradually increasing from 1,349 seven years earlier and down from 2,042 in 2009.

Heist or theft is a common crime in the city. Most houses are protected by high walls and wealthier residents are often able to afford greater protection such as electric fencing, private security or gated communities. Crime rates vary widely across the city and most inner suburbs have much lower murder rates than in outlying areas of Ethekwini. Police station precincts recording the lowest murder rates per 100,000 in 2017 were Durban North (7), Mayville (8), Westville (12) and Malvern (12); while some of the most dangerous areas were Kwamashu (76) and Umlazi (69). Other crime comparisons are less valuable due to significant under-reporting especially in outlying areas.

There was a period of intense violence beginning in the 1990s, and the Durban area recorded a murder rate of 83 per 100,000 in 1999. The murder rate dropped rapidly in the 2000s before increasing rapidly throughout the 2010s. Durban is one of the main drug trafficking routes for drugs exiting and entering sub-Saharan Africa. The drug trade has increased significantly over the past 20 years.

=== Xenophobic episodes ===
Xenophobic Protests in 2026
- Xenophobia in Durban (2026)

Many residents and businesses in Durban's CBD have witnessed, experienced or perpetuated xenophobic attacks. In 2008,, in 2015 and in 2026. Clean up events, arranged by March on March, have consisted of street sweeping and litter collection and immigrant assaults. Foreign nationals and asylum seekers have been sleeping outside refugee centres, seeking protection and papers.

== Education ==
=== Private schools ===
- Al Falaah College
- Canaan College
- Clifton School
- Crawford College, La Lucia
- Crawford College, North Coast
- Durban Girls' College
- Eden College Durban
- Highbury Preparatory School
- Hillcrest Christian Academy
- Maris Stella School
- Orient Islamic School
- Reddam House
- Roseway Waldorf School
- St. Henry's Marist Brothers' College
- St. Mary's Diocesan School for Girls, Kloof
- Thomas More College
- T Thunder College

=== Public schools ===
- Brettonwood High School
- Durban Academy High School
- Durban Girls' High School
- Durban High School
- Durban North College
- George Campbell School of Technology
- Glenwood High School
- Hillcrest High School
- Kloof High School
- Kloof Junior Primary School
- Kloof Pre-Primary School
- Kloof Senior Primary School
- Northlands Girls' High School
- Northwood School
- Pinetown Boys' High School
- Pinetown Girls' High School
- Port Natal High School
- Queensburgh Girls' High School
- Savannah Park Secondary School
- Westville Boys' High School
- Westville Girls' High School

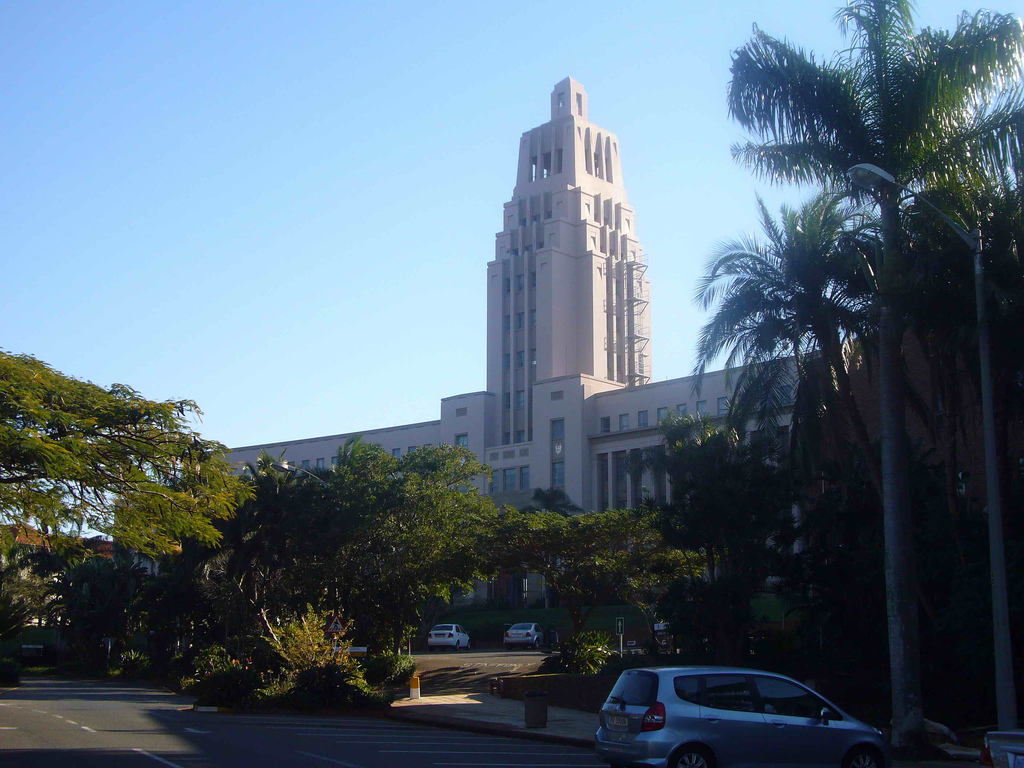
Memorial Tower Building, Howard College Campus, University of KwaZulu-Natal

=== Universities and colleges ===
- Durban University of Technology
- Mangosuthu University of Technology
- Regent Business School
- University of KwaZulu-Natal
- University of South Africa
- Varsity College (South Africa)
- eta College

== Twin towns and sister cities ==
Durban is twinned with:

- Alexandria, Egypt
- Antwerp, Flanders, Belgium
- Bremen, Germany
- Bulawayo, Zimbabwe
- Chicago, Illinois, US
- Gwangju, South Korea
- Eilat, Israel
- Guangzhou, China
- Le Port, Réunion
- Kaohsiung, Taiwan
- Leeds, United Kingdom
- Maracaibo, Venezuela
- Maputo, Mozambique
- Nantes, France
- New Orleans, Louisiana, US
- Oran, Algeria
- Rotterdam, Netherlands
- Mombasa, Kenya

== Notable residents ==
- Navi Pillay, Nobel Peace Prize winner, South African jurist & judge
- Dianne Lynne Bevelander, South African academic and activist
- Bruce Grobbelaar, Footballer, Liverpool FC
- Alan Khan, radio and television presenter
- Gordon Murray, engineer and McLaren designer
- Jan-Hendrik S. Hofmeyr, biochemist, born in Durban in 1953
- Raoul Hyman, racing driver
- Bruce Johnstone, racing driver
- Aaron Klug, Nobel prizewinner
- Jyoti Mistry, film director, installation artist, teacher and scholar
- Brausch Niemann, racing driver
- Jayapraga Reddy (1947–1996), writer
- Vivian Reddy, business founder and philanthropist
- Jack Saul, South African-Israeli tennis player
- Billy Tennant, professional flowboarder
- Stephen Watson, racing driver
- Victor Xulu, former cricketer
- Ela Gandhi, peace activist, granddaughter of Mahatma Gandhi
- Lara Logan, journalist
- Pearl Thusi, actress
- Chad Le Clos, Olympic swimmer
- Jordy Smith, surfer
- Grant Baker, surfer
- John Smit, Rugby World Cup–winning captain
- Penelope Coelen, Miss World 1958
- Nick Price, major winning golfer
- Black Coffee, DJ, record producer and songwriter
- Baby Queen, singer-songwriter
- Fernando Pessoa (1888–1935), poet, writer, philosopher
- Kevin Curren, tennis player
- Mabel Nevill (1865–1958), human computer and tennis champion
- John Steenhuisen, former leader of the Democratic Alliance
- Charlene, Princess of Monaco, Olympic swimmer and Monegasque royalty
- Lee Brilleaux, former lead singer/harmonica player of Dr. Feelgood (band)
- Bronek Masojada, Lord Mayor of London for 2026/2027

== See also ==
- Black December
- Durban International Film Festival
- Durban Youth Council
- Emmanuel Cathedral
- Riverside Soofie Mosque and Mausoleum
- World Conference against Racism 2001 – held in Durban
