= Durban City Hall =

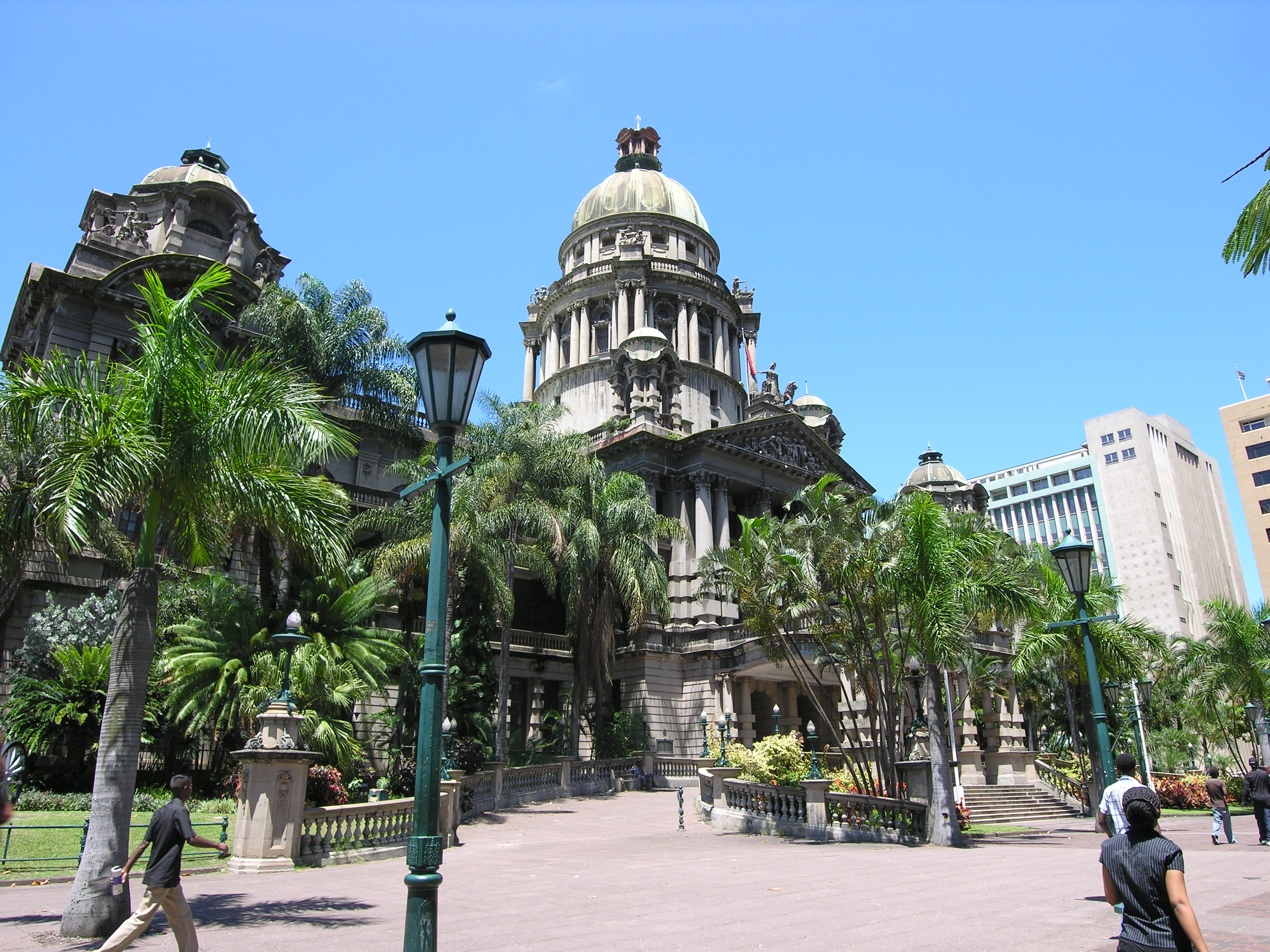
- Durban City Hall in 2006
- Click on the map for a fullscreen view

General information
- Location: Durban, South Africa
- Coordinates: 29°51′30.6″S 31°1′35.4″E

Durban City Hall is a historic city hall located at Durban in KwaZulu-Natal, South Africa.

== History ==
The building was designed by architect Stanley G. Hudson and erected between 1906 and 1910.

== Description ==
The building, which features an Edwardian neobaroque style, is almost an exact replica of Belfast City Hall in Northern Ireland. The façades are decorated by allegorical statues depicting the arts, music, literature, commerce and industry.

== Gallery ==
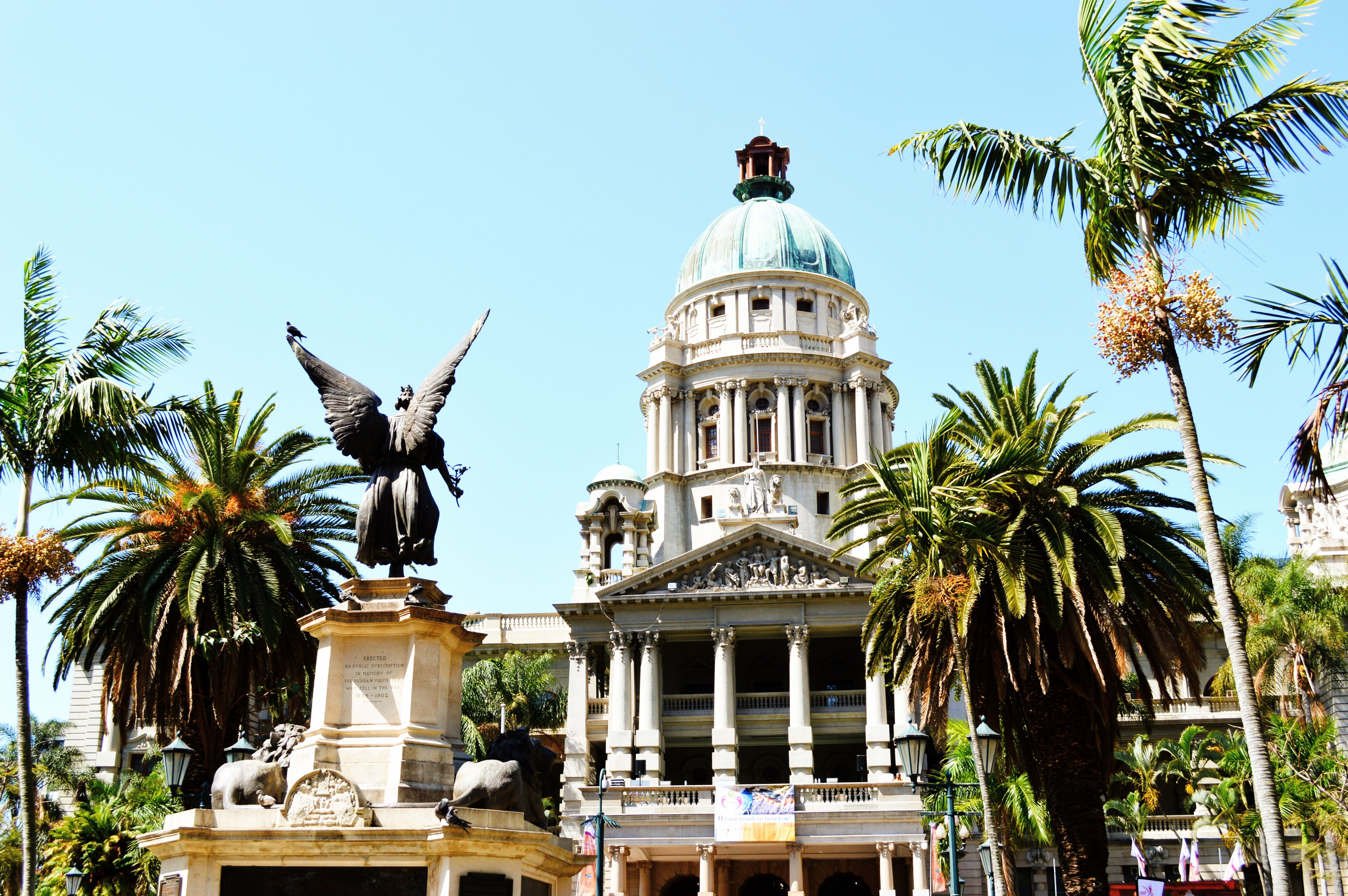

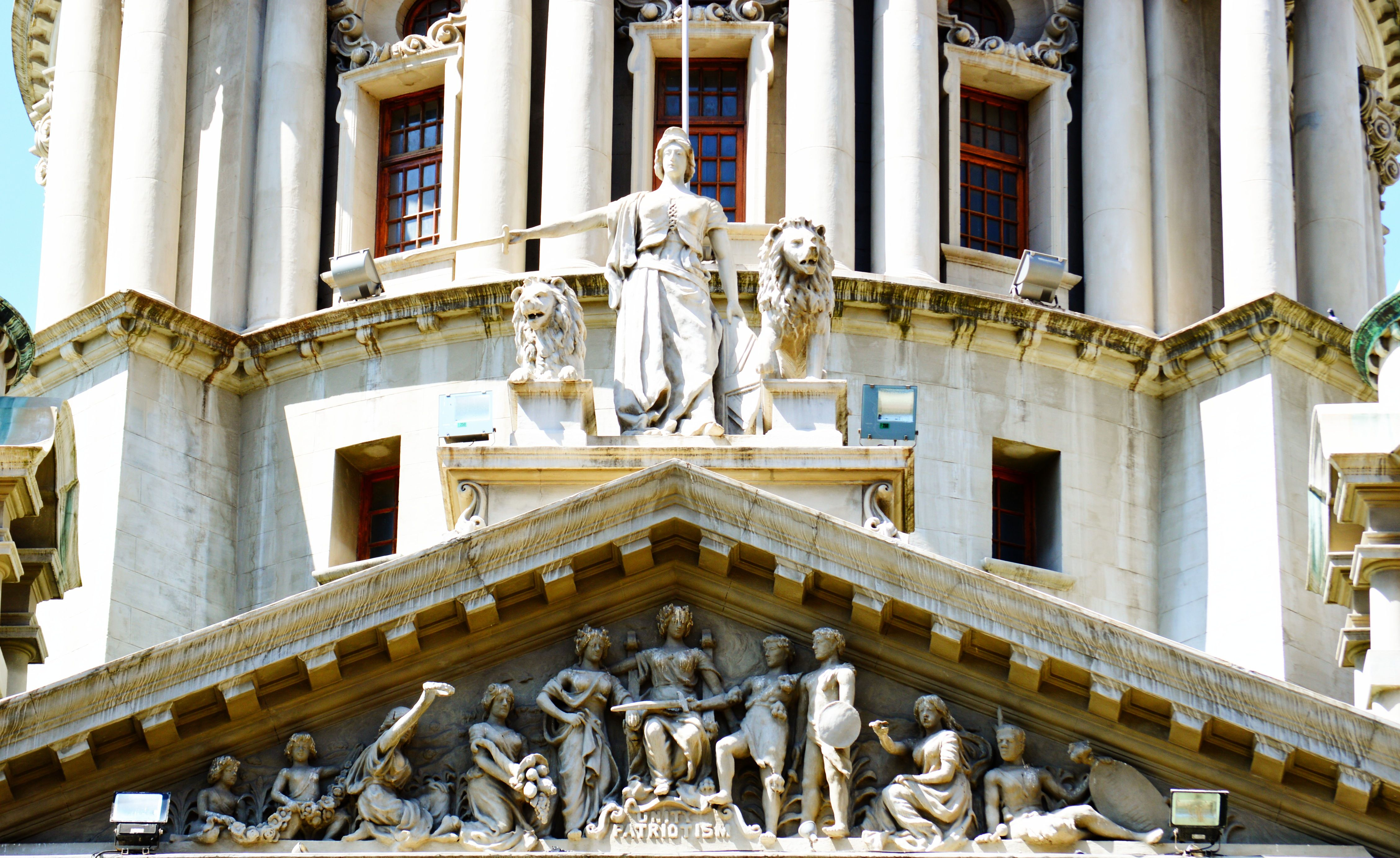

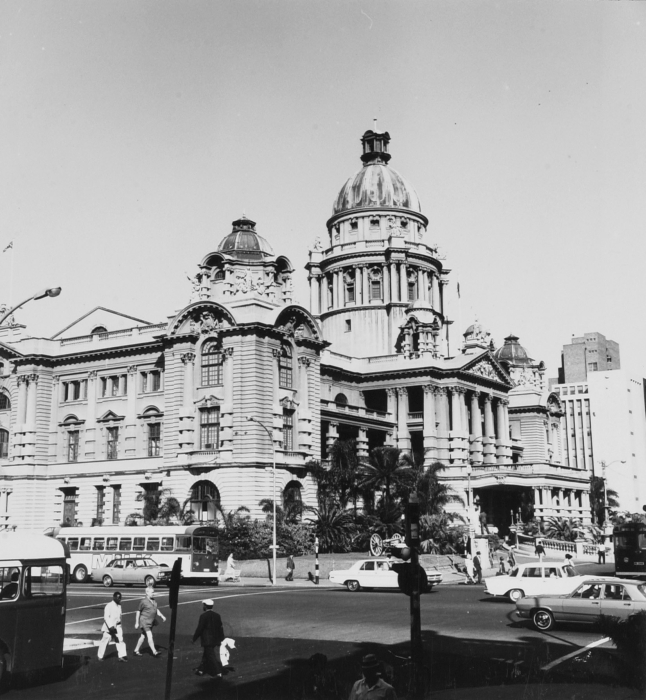

== See also ==
- List of heritage sites in KwaZulu-Natal
