= List of Art Deco buildings in Tasmania =

This list of Art Deco buildings in Tasmania includes historically significant Art Deco buildings in Tasmania.

Art Deco is a loose term, that may include:

- Interwar Free Classicism (Deco Free Classicism): using classical motifs largely as decoration, in a very stylised or abstracted manner, with little reference to the norms of the classical language
- Jazz Moderne [Zig-Zag Moderne]: No particular classical references. Angular lines and vertical emphasis. Somewhat related to ‘Skyscraper Gothic’.
- Streamline Moderne: No particular classical references. Curved lines and horizontal emphasis. Related to the ‘streamlining’ of contemporary forms of transport.

== Office and commercial buildings ==
- Commonwealth Bank Building, Hobart, Elizabeth Street, Hobart
- Hobart Mercury Building, Hobart
- Hydro-Electric Commission Building, Davey Street, Hobart
- Prudential Insurance Building, Elizabeth Street, Hobart
- T&G Insurance Building, Hobart
- Colonial Mutual Life building, Hobart
- Original Myer Building, Liverpool Street, Hobart (Destroyed By fire 22 September 2007)
- Former Government Printer, 2-4 Salamanca Place, Hobart
- Land's Building, Hobart
- The State Library of Tasmania, Hobart
- 10 Murray Street, Hobart (demolished 2018)
- Holyman House, corner of Brisbane and George Street, Launceston
- Hotel Charles (Old Launceston General Hospital), Launceston
- Park Hotel, Invermay Road, Launceston
- Former Tasmania Savings Bank, Invermay Road, Launceston
- Holmes Building, corner Brisbane and Charles Street, Launceston
- Duncan House, Launceston
- Princess Theatre, Launceston
- Alfred Harrap Building, corner of Tamar and Cimitier Street, Launceston
- Shepherds Bakery, corner Quadrant and St John Street, Launceston
- Medibank House (Launceston Gas Company), St John Street, Launceston
- Lucks Corner, corner Patterson and George Street, Launceston
- Star Theatre (St Vincent De Pauls), Invermay Road, Launceston
- Rapson Tyre Factory, west end of Gleadow Street, Invermay, Launceston
- Deacons Corner, corner Lytton Street and Invermay Road, Invermay, Launceston
- Legacy House, Launceston
- Hently House, Launceston
- Don College, Devonport

== Institutional buildings ==
- Royal Hobart Hospital, Hobart

== See also ==
- List of Art Deco architecture
- List of Art Deco architecture in Oceania
