= George Campbell School of Technology =

Coordinates: 29.84306°S 31.03262°E

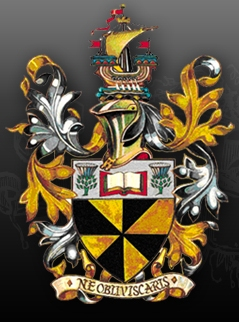
- Durban, KwaZulu-Natal; South Africa

Information
- Type: Public, Co-Educational
- Motto: Ne Obliviscaris
- Established: 1963
- Locale: Urban
- Headmaster: Jacques Van Leeuwen
- Exam board: KZN
- Grades: 8 - 12
- Enrollment: 1,000 pupils
- Website: www.georgecampbell.co.za

George Campbell School of Technology is a public high school specialising in technical education, located in Durban, KwaZulu-Natal, South Africa. The school was founded as George Campbell Technical High School in 1963 and today has a co-educational student body of over 1100 pupils. The curriculum includes the compulsory subjects of Mathematics, Physical Science & Chemistry, Engineering Graphics and Design, English and Afrikaans or IsiZulu.

Electives offered are:

- Woodworking
- Civil Construction
- Civil Services
- Fitting and Machining
- Automotive
- Welding
- Electrical Technology
- Electronics
- Digital Electronics

== Facilities ==
- The Media Centre is available to all students to use during breaks and after school. Besides books, there are computers connected to the Internet, printers and photocopy facilities. The school employs a full-time librarian.
- The swimming pool is 25m long and is used extensively by the school swimming and water polo teams.
- The Information Technology Centre is divided into two sections so that two classes can be accommodated at the same time. One section has 32 computers and the other 34. In 2006 a third computer room was added with 34 computers. The computers in the centre are networked, linked to high speed printers and the Internet. All students do ICDL or Computer Literacy classes in grades 8 and 9 where they learn about the parts, construction and development of the computer, the Internet, and programs.

In Grade 10 learners have the choice of doing either IT, where they learn programming, such as Java, or CAT (Computer Applications Technology) where they learn computer applications such as databases, word processors and webpage design. These subjects are done through to grade 12.

== Electrical Technology Centre ==
The Electrical Technology Centre is capable of accommodating a diverse range of disciplines as outlined in its curriculum, including Electrical (Heavy Current), Electronics (Light Current), Digital Systems, and Communication Systems.

== Civil Technology Centre ==
The institute offers dedicated facilities tailored to the distinct Civil Technology domains encompassed within its campus curriculum, encompassing Woodworking, Plumbing, and Construction.

== Mechanical Technology Centre ==
The introduction of the NCS document brought about a significant addition to the syllabus, in the form of a novel subject known as Mechanical Technology. This subject centered on technological processes, encompassing design, systematic problem-solving, and the practical application of scientific principles. Notably, Mechanical Technology consolidated the previously distinct subjects of Motor Mechanics, Fitting and Turning, and Technica Mechanica into a unified curriculum.

In a more recent development, the school has undertaken a diversification of its Mechanical Technology discipline, including Automotive Technology, Welding, and Fitting and Machining.

== AutoCAD Centre ==
The CAD center operates a network of 35 computers, all equipped with AutoCAD software. The facility is staffed by a team of four educators, instructing Grade 10 through Grade 12 students in the usage of AutoCAD. Notably, the curriculum extends to Grade 12 learners, where in addition to AutoCAD instruction, they are also provided with training in 3D modeling techniques.

== Sport ==
On Saturdays, a total of 14 teams participate in competitive matches.

The educational institution further provides a range of sporting pursuits, including but not limited to:

- Swimming
- Rugby
- Rugby Sevens
- Football
- Water Polo
- Hockey
- Cricket
- Surfing & Bodyboarding
- Netball
- Chess
- Basketball

The educational institution further provides a range of extracurricular pursuits, including but not limited to:

- Poetry Club
- Drama Club
- Choir Club
- Revolutions Club
- Interact Club
- Durban Youth Council
