= Crawford =

Crawford may refer to:

== Places ==
=== Canada ===
- Crawford Bay Airport, British Columbia
- Crawford Lake Conservation Area, Ontario

=== United Kingdom ===
- Crawford, Lancashire, a small village near Rainford, Merseyside, England
- Crawford, South Lanarkshire, a village in Scotland
  - Crawford Castle, a medieval fortification
- Tarrant Crawford in Dorset, England
- Crawford Castle, an iron-age fortification, in Spetisbury, Dorset, England
- Crawford Priory, a country house about three kilometres (two miles) southwest of Cupar, Fife, Scotland

=== United States ===
- Crawford, Alabama (disambiguation), several places
- Crawford, Colorado
- Crawford, Florida
- Crawford, Georgia
- Crawford, Maine
- Crawford, Mississippi
- Crawford, Missouri
- Crawford, Nebraska
- Crawford, New York
- Crawford, Ohio
- Crawford, Oklahoma
- Crawford, Texas
- Crawford Notch, a mountain pass in New Hampshire
- Crawford County (disambiguation), several counties
- Crawford Township (disambiguation), several townships

=== Elsewhere ===
- Crawford crater, Australia
- Crawford, Cape Town, a suburb of Cape Town, South Africa
- Crawford, Tiruchirappalli, a suburb in Tiruchirappalli, India
- Mount Crawford (South Australia), a location in Australia
- Crawford Market, a place in India
- Crawford, Singapore, a subzone of Kallang planning area in Central Region, Singapore

== Arts and entertainment ==
- Crawford (film), a documentary film about Crawford, Texas
- Crawford (TV series), a television comedy series, on CBC Television, in which one of the characters has the ability to speak to raccoons
- Crawford or Crawford & Morgan, a short-lived syndicated comic strip (1977–1978) by Chuck Jones

== Organisations ==
- Crawford & Company, a major insurance claims management company
- Crawford and Son, a defunct South Australian grocery business
- Crawford Auto-Aviation Museum, part of the Western Reserve Historical Society, Cleveland, Ohio, US
- William Crawford & Sons, former British biscuit company
- Crawford Composites, American manufacturer of carbon fiber and composite parts

== People ==
- Crawford (name), given name and surname, includes a list of people with the name
- Clan Crawford, Scottish clan
- Crawford family murder, 1970 murders of a pregnant mother and her three children in Australia

== Schools ==
=== South Africa ===
- Crawford College, Durban
- Crawford College, La Lucia
- Crawford College, Lonehill
- Crawford College, North Coast
- Crawford College, Pretoria
- Crawford College, Sandton

=== Other ===
- Crawford School of Public Policy at the Australian National University, Canberra

== Other uses ==
- Crawford Hall (University of Pittsburgh), an academic building on the campus of the University of Pittsburgh
- Crawford Purchase, 1783 treaty that enabled Loyalist settlement in what is now part of eastern Ontario, Canada
- Crawford v. Washington, a U.S. Supreme Court case regarding the Sixth Amendment to the U.S. Constitution
- Crawford v. Marion County Election Bd., a U.S. Supreme Court case regarding voter-ID laws
- Hasely Crawford Stadium, national stadium of Trinidad and Tobago
- Pittsburgh Crawfords, a Negro league baseball team
- Crawford's Advertising Agency, company in London

== See also ==
- Crawfordjohn, South Lanarkshire, Scotland, a village
- Crawfordsburn, County Down, Northern Ireland, a village
- Crawfordville (disambiguation)
- Crawfordsville (disambiguation)
- Justice Crawford (disambiguation)
- Mount Crawford (disambiguation)
