= Darling (surname) =

Darling is a surname that may refer to:

== Politicians ==
- Alberta Darling (born 1944), American politician
- Alex Darling, Australian politician
- Alistair Darling (1953–2023), British politician and government minister
- Charles Henry Darling (1809–1870), British colonial governor
- Charles Darling, 1st Baron Darling (1849–1936), British lawyer, politician and judge
- Don Darling, Canadian politician
- James Andrew Darling (1891–1979), Saskatchewan, Canada, politician 1944–1960
- John Darling Sr. (1831–1905), South Australian merchant and politician
- John Darling Jr. (1852–1914), South Australian businessman and politician
- John P. Darling (1815–1882), New York politician
- Lucius B. Darling (1827–1896), American fertilizer magnate and Lieutenant governor of Rhode Island 1885–1887
- Ralph Darling (1772–1858), British Army officer, governor of New South Wales, Australia
- Ruby Ann Darling (born 1941), Bahamian politician
- Steve Darling (born 1969), British politician
- William Darling (politician) (1885–1962), British politician and businessman

== Sports ==
- Boob Darling (1903–1968), National Football League player
- Chuck Darling (1930–2021), American basketball player
- Dennis Darling, Bahamian athlete
- Dylan Darling, college basketball player
- Gary Darling, Major League Baseball umpire
- Hannah Darling (golfer) (born 2003), Scottish golfer
- Helen Darling, American basketball player
- Joe Darling (1870–1946), Australian cricket captain, 1899–1905
- Lon Darling, founder of the United States' National Basketball League
- Malcolm Darling (born 1947), Scottish footballer
- Max Darling (born 2000), Vincentian-New Zealand basketball player
- Nate Darling (born 1998), Canadian basketball player
- Randy Darling (born 1957), American curler
- Ron Darling, Major League Baseball player

== Entertainment ==
- Bobby Darling, Indian actress
- David Darling (musician), American cellist and composer
- Erik Darling (1933–2008), American songwriter and folk music artist
- Helen Darling (singer), American country music singer/songwriter
- Ida Darling (1875–1936), American actress
- Jean Darling (1922–2015), American child actress
- Jennifer Darling, American actress
- Maria Darling, British actress
- Roy Darling, Australian film director and songwriter
- Sarah Darling, American country music singer and songwriter
- Darling, mononymous nickname of Indian actor Prabhas (born 1979)

== Other professions ==
- Brian Darling (born 1965), American lawyer and lobbyist
- David J. Darling, British astronomer and writer
- Donald Darling, British spy
- Donald Allan Darling (1915–2014), American statistician
- Edward Darling (born 1933), Irish bishop
- Flora Adams Darling (1840–1910), American author and clubwoman
- Frank Darling (architect) (1850–1923), Canadian architect
- Fred Darling (1884–1953), British racehorse trainer, son of Sam
- Gordon Darling (1921–2015), Australian businessman and philanthropist, husband of Marilyn Darling
- Grace Darling (1815–1842), British lighthouse keeper
- Hoby Darling, American business executive
- Jay Norwood Darling (1876–1962), known as Ding Darling, American cartoonist and conservationist
- John Darling Sr. (1831–1905), South Australian merchant and politician
- John Darling Jr. (1852–1914), South Australian businessman and politician
- Joseph Robinson Darling (1872–1957), special agent of the U.S. Department of Justice, author, promoter, explorer and soldier of fortune
- Lowell Darling, American artist
- Sir Malcolm Lyall Darling (1880–1969), administrator in British India and authority on peasant agriculture
- Marilyn Darling (born 1943), Australian philanthropist and patron of the arts, wife of Gordon Darling
- Pamela Darling, American librarian and preservation specialist
- Paul Darling, English barrister
- Sam Darling (1852–1921), British racehorse trainer
- Samuel Taylor Darling (1872–1925), American scientist
- Thomas Darling (1720–1789), Connecticut entrepreneur

== Fiction ==
- Captain Kevin Darling, in the TV series Blackadder
- Cherry Darling, in the Planet Terror segment of Grindhouse, played by Rose McGowan
- Nola Darling, in Spike Lee's She's Gotta Have It
- Wendy Darling, principal character in J. M. Barrie's Peter Pan, and other members of the Darling family
- The Darlings of The Andy Griffith Show
- The Darlings of Clarissa Explains It All
- The Darlings of Dirty Sexy Money, headed by Patrick "Tripp" Darling III
- Jessica Darling series of novels by Megan McCafferty
- Darling, the owner of Lady in Lady and the Tramp
- Monica Costello aka Darling, a bank robber and the wife of fellow bank robber Buddy in Baby Driver portrayed by Eiza Gonzalez
- Sarah Darling (Scream), fictional actor in "Stab 3" played by Jenny McCarthy from Scream 3
- Casper Darling, a doctor in the video game Control, as well as its sequel Control Resonant, played by Matthew Porretta

== See also ==
- Darling (disambiguation)
- Charles Darling (disambiguation)
- Elizabeth Darling (disambiguation)
- Sam Darling (disambiguation)
- William Darling (disambiguation)
- Linda Darling-Hammond
- Darlington (disambiguation)
