= Crawford College =

Crawford College may refer to:

- Crawford College, Durban, KwaZulu-Natal, South Africa
- Crawford College, La Lucia, KwaZulu-Natal, South Africa
- Crawford College, Lonehill, Gauteng, South Africa
- Crawford College, North Coast, KwaZulu-Natal, South Africa
- Crawford College, Pretoria, Gauteng, South Africa
- Crawford College, Sandton, Gauteng, South Africa
- Crawford College of Art and Design, part of the Cork Institute of Technology, Ireland
