= Crawford High School =

Crawford High School may refer to:

- Will C. Crawford High School in San Diego, California, and latterly Crawford Educational Complex
- Crawford Educational Complex in San Diego, California, and formerly Will C. Crawford High School
- Crawford High School (Colorado) in Crawford, Colorado, closed in 1962 when the district consolidated with Delta County and students were split between Paonia and Hotchkiss
- Crawford County High School (Georgia) in Roberta, Georgia
- Crawford County High School (Indiana) in Marengo, Indiana, and also known as Crawford County Junior-Senior High School
- Crawford High School (Arcadia, Louisiana), listed on the National Register of Historic Places
- Crawford High School (Nebraska) in Crawford, Nebraska
- Colonel Crawford High School in North Robinson, Ohio
- Crawford High School (Texas)
  - Crawford High School, in Crawford, Texas
  - Almeta Crawford High School in Fort Bend County, Texas.
- North Crawford High School in Crawford County, Wisconsin
- Crawford Colleges in South Africa
  - Crawford College, Pretoria
  - Crawford College, Lonehill
  - Crawford College, North Coast
  - Crawford College, Sandton
  - Crawford College, Durban
  - Crawford College, La Lucia
