= John Darling =

John Darling may refer to:

- John Darling (comic strip), a comic strip published 1979 to 1990
- John P. Darling (1815–1882), American politician from New York
- John Darling Sr. (1831–1916), politician in South Australia and businessman
- John Darling Jr. (1852–1914), politician in South Australia and company director
- John Darling (Peter Pan), a character in Peter Pan
- John Darling and Son, an Australian wheat merchant and flour milling company, formed by John Darling, Sr
