= Dheeran Nagar =

- Neighbourhood
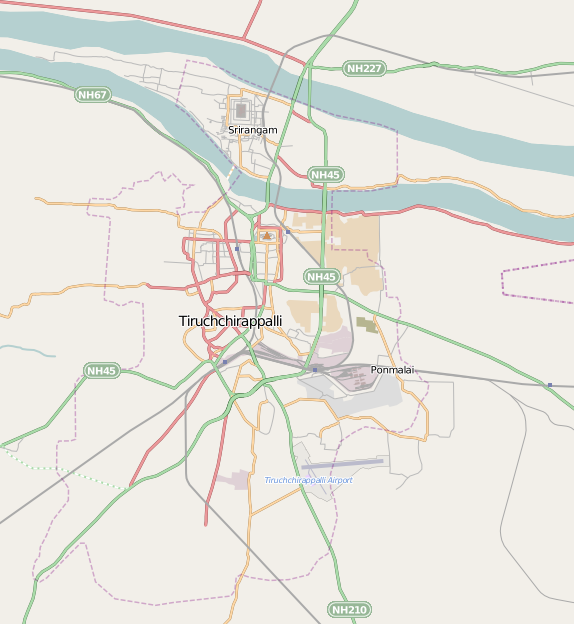
- Dheeran Nagar, Tiruchirappalli, Tamil Nadu
- Coordinates: 10.7977°N 78.6584°E
- Country: India
- State: Tamil Nadu
- District: Tiruchirappalli
- Elevation: 94.14 m (308.9 ft)

Languages
  - Official: Tamil, English
  - Speech: Tamil, English
- Time zone: UTC+5:30 (IST)
- PIN: 620001
- Telephone code: +91431*******
- Vehicle registration: TN - 45 ** xxxx
- Other Neighbourhoods: Tiruchirappalli, Pirattiyur, Karumandapam
- Corporation: Tiruchirappalli City Corporation
- LS: Tiruchirappalli
- VS: Tiruchirappalli West

Dheeran Nagar is a neighbourhood of the city of Tiruchirappalli in Tamil Nadu, India.

== Details ==
This area is adjoining Pirattiyur, Trichy. It comes under ward No. 40 of the Tiruchirappalli City Corporation. Dheeran Nagar which is also referred as 'Dheeran Chinnamalai Nagar', includes residential area and Transport depot. It is named after one of the renowned freedom fighters viz., Dheeran Chinnamalai. National Highway 83, formerly designated as NH 45, passes through the area. It comprises nearly 500 to 600 families. It lies on the banks of Koraiyar river. Dheeran Nagar is well connected by roadways. Dheeran Nagar falls under Tiruchirappalli West Assembly constituency.
