= Crawford Bay =

Crawford Bay may refer to:

- Crawford Bay, British Columbia, a small community in southeast British Columbia, Canada
  - Crawford Bay Airport, an airport in Crawford Bay, British Columbia
- Crawford Bay (Western Australia), a small bay located in Western Australia

== See also ==
Crawford (disambiguation)
