= Flaxman crater =

Impact crater in South Australia

- Location within South Australia
- Location: South Australia, Australia; 34°37′S 139°4′E

Impact crater structure
- Confidence: Confirmed
- Diameter: 10 km (6.2 mi)
- Age: >35 Ma ?Eocene
- Exposed: Yes
- Drilled: No

Flaxman is a meteorite impact site in South Australia, Australia.

It is up to 10 km long, though probably shorter, and is very narrow. Quartz rocks in the valley are affected by impact pressures and these deformation features are thought to be due to a ricochet event from a nearby impact at the Crawford crater, part of a proposed wider multiple impact. The impact date for the Flaxman site is as for Crawford, both estimated to be greater than 35 million years (probably Eocene). The affected rocks are exposed at the surface.
