= Crawford College, Lonehill =

Private school in Gauteng, South Africa

Coordinates: 26.01444°S 28.03018°E

Crawford International Lonehill

Location
- Region E Johannesburg, Gauteng; South Africa -26.0143400, 28.0300700

Information
- Other name: Crawford College Lonehill
- Funding type: Private school
- Established: 1999; 27 years ago
- Website: www.crawfordinternational.co.za/lonehill

Crawford International Lonehill is an independent school in Lone Hill (City of Johannesburg Metropolitan Municipality), Gauteng, South Africa. Crawford follows the Independent Examinations Board (IEB) programme.

== History ==
Crawford International Lonehill opened in 1999 and celebrated its 25th anniversary in 2024. The schools which comprise the Crawford Collection constitute the largest single private school organisation in South Africa. Crawford International Lonehill offers a range of extra mural activities, including basketball, hockey, water polo, swimming, soccer, cricket, tennis, netball, dance, esports, public speaking, and equestrianism. There are 22 Crawford schools altogether including:

- Crawford International College, Sandton
- Crawford College, La Lucia
- Crawford College, Pretoria
- Crawford International North Coast
- Crawford International Fourways
- Crawford International Ruimsig

Crawford International Lonehill has 3 campuses in the heart of Lonehill including a Pre-Primary, Preparatory and College.
