= Crawfordsville =

Crawfordsville may refer to the following places in the United States:

- Crawfordsville, Arkansas
- Crawfordsville, Indiana, largest place with this name
- Crawfordsville, Iowa
- Crawfordsville, Ohio
- Crawfordsville, Oregon

== See also ==
- Crawfordville (disambiguation)
