= Harold Gordon Darling =

Australian businessperson (1885–1950)

- Born: 9 June 1885; Adelaide, South Australia
- Died: 26 January 1950 (aged 64); Toorak, Melbourne, Victoria
- Education: Prince Alfred College
- Known for: Long-serving chairman of BHP
- Board member of: The Broken Hill Proprietary Company (BHP) (chair, 1923–1950; dir., 1914–1950); Australian Wheat Board; Australian Iron & Steel (chair); Commonwealth Aircraft Corporation (chair, 1936– ); Imperial Chemical Industries of Australia and New Zealand (dir.); Imperial Chemical Industries of Australia and New Zealand (dir.); Institute of Public Affairs (founder)
- Spouse(s): Dorothy Hazel, née Heath (m. 1913)
- Children: 3
- Parents: John Darling, Jr. (father); Jessie, née Dowie (mother)
- Relatives: John Darling, Sr. (grandfather); Joe Darling CBE (uncle); Leonard Gordon Darling (nephew)

Harold Gordon Darling (9 June 1885 – 26 January 1950) was an Australian businessman and company director, perhaps best known for his role as long-serving chairman of The Broken Hill Proprietary Company, from 1923 to 1950, and for running the family business of John Darling and Son, grain merchants and flour millers.

== Background and early years ==
Darling was born in Adelaide in 1885, the eldest son of John Darling, Jr. and his wife, Jessie, née Dowie. Educated at Prince Alfred College, Harold Darling entered the family business of John Darling and Son, grain merchants, in 1903.

== Business career ==
On his father's death, in March 1914, he became principal of John Darling & Son; the headquarters were moved to Melbourne, where he settled. During World War I, at the request of Prime Minister Billy Hughes, he served on the advisory council of the Australian Wheat Board.

On 14 April 1914 Darling accepted an invitation to join the board of The Broken Hill Proprietary Company to fill the vacancy caused by his father's death. He was elected chairman of the board on 27 October 1922; at the time, its youngest director. Addressing shareholders for the first time in 1923, Darling announced the company's first annual loss since 1909, due to a nine-month closure of the Newcastle steelworks. No dividends were paid between 1921 and 1925 but in those years the company extended its activities into coal-mining, built up a fleet, and set up its first subsidiaries. Darling faced what was probably his most difficult meeting with the shareholders in 1930, after a coal stoppage and another year of no dividends, but by 1935 the worst of the company's difficulties were over. Negotiations had begun for the takeover of the local rival Australian Iron & Steel Ltd; two years later BHP was to make its largest profit to that date, passing the A£1 million mark. His last meeting with BHP shareholders was in 1949, when the effects of the seven-week general coal strike and a strike in BHP's iron ore quarries were reflected in a fall of profits. As chairman of BHP, Darling took the company from a struggling Newcastle steelworks to a steel monopoly spanning three Australian states, with its own mines, transport, and fabricating subsidiaries, and made the cheapest steel in the world. Darling had oversight of the company's issued capital rise from A£3,000,000 to over A£15,000,000; and he collaborated closely with general manager Essington Lewis, who became a close friend.

Ahead of World War II, BHP succeeded in forming a syndicate for the manufacture of aircraft; Darling became first chairman of the Commonwealth Aircraft Corporation (CAC) when it was set up in 1936. In 1941 he was appointed by the Australian government to the Aircraft Advisory Committee, representing the CAC. In 1934 Darling had doubted whether shipbuilding could succeed in Australia as a commercial venture. But his growing conviction of the seriousness of the international situation led him to prepare the company to be ready to accept an official request to begin shipbuilding at Whyalla when it came in 1939.

Darling was also chairman of Australian Iron & Steel, Wellington Alluvials, Stewarts & Lloyds (Aust.), Rylands Bros (Aust.), and BHP By Products; and was a director of BHP Collieries, Tubemakers of Australia, and British Tube Mills (Aust.), Imperial Chemical Industries of Australia and New Zealand, and the National Bank of Australasia.

Traditionally conservative, Darling was friendly with, though not uncritical of, Prime Minister Sir Robert Menzies, and in 1942 he was a founder and council-member of the Institute of Public Affairs. In 1944 Darling noted with alarm the Chifley Labor government's plan to nationalise airways, banks, and insurance companies.

== Death and legacy ==
Darling died on 26 January 1950 of cancer, at his home, "Warrawee", on Kooyong Road, in Toorak, Melbourne. Survived by his wife and three children, he left a personal fortune of c.A£280,000.

Despite his influence and great business ability, Darling shunned publicity and rarely spoke in public. In 1929, when he gave £10,000 to found the Waite Soil Research Centre at Urrbrae, Adelaide, he expressed regret that the gift had to be made public. Another donation of £15,000 was made to the University of Adelaide for the equipment of a medical school.

In 1951 BHP commissioned a portrait of Darling by William Dargie, subsequently donated by BHP Billiton in 2002 to the National Portrait Gallery. In 1951, BHP also announced the H. G. Darling Memorial Scholarship, tenable at the South Australian School of Mines, for BHP employees and their families.
