= Alexander Hunter Crawford =

Scottish architect and businessman (1865–1945)

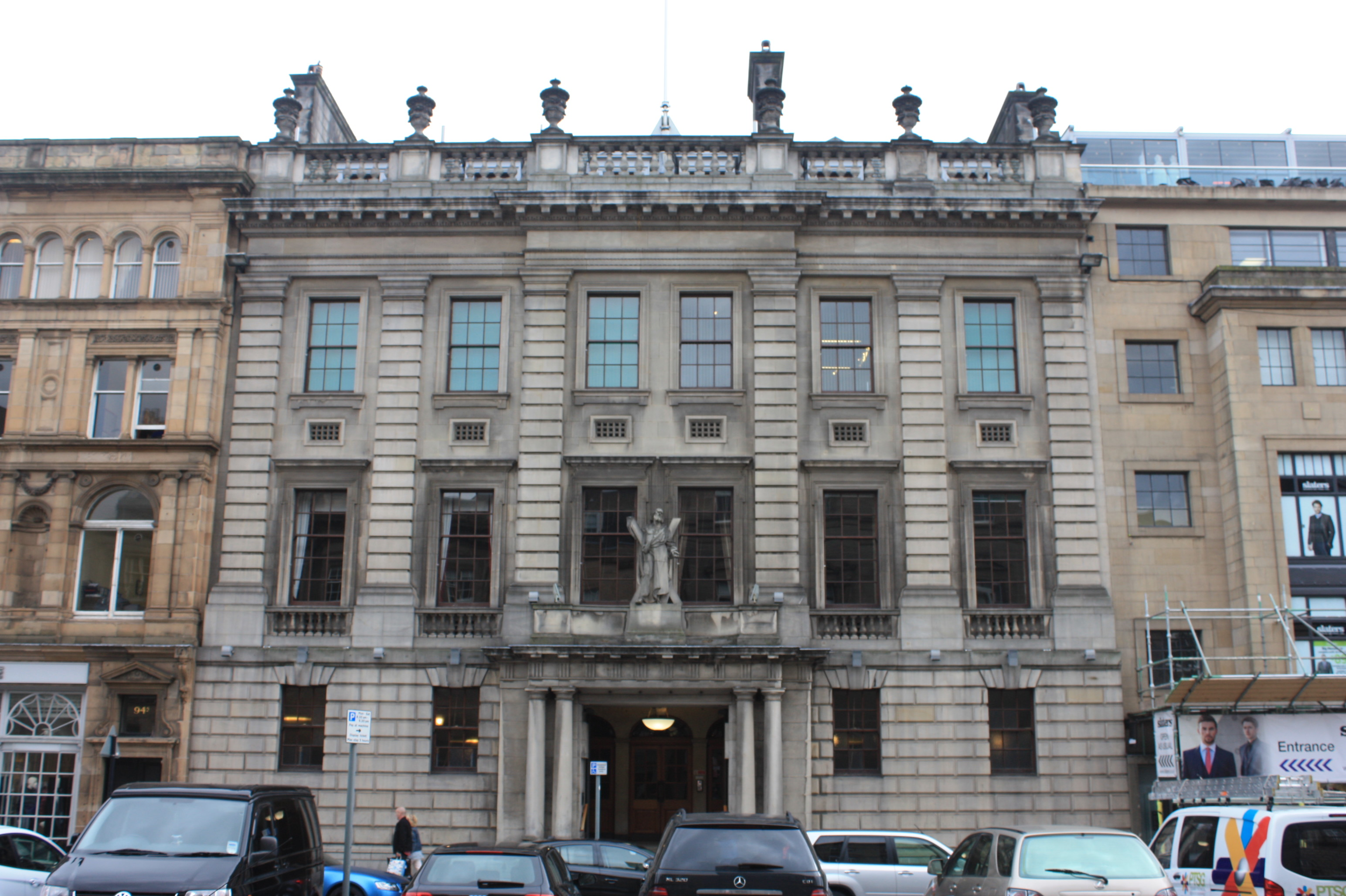
The Masonic Lodge on George Street, Edinburgh by A H Crawford

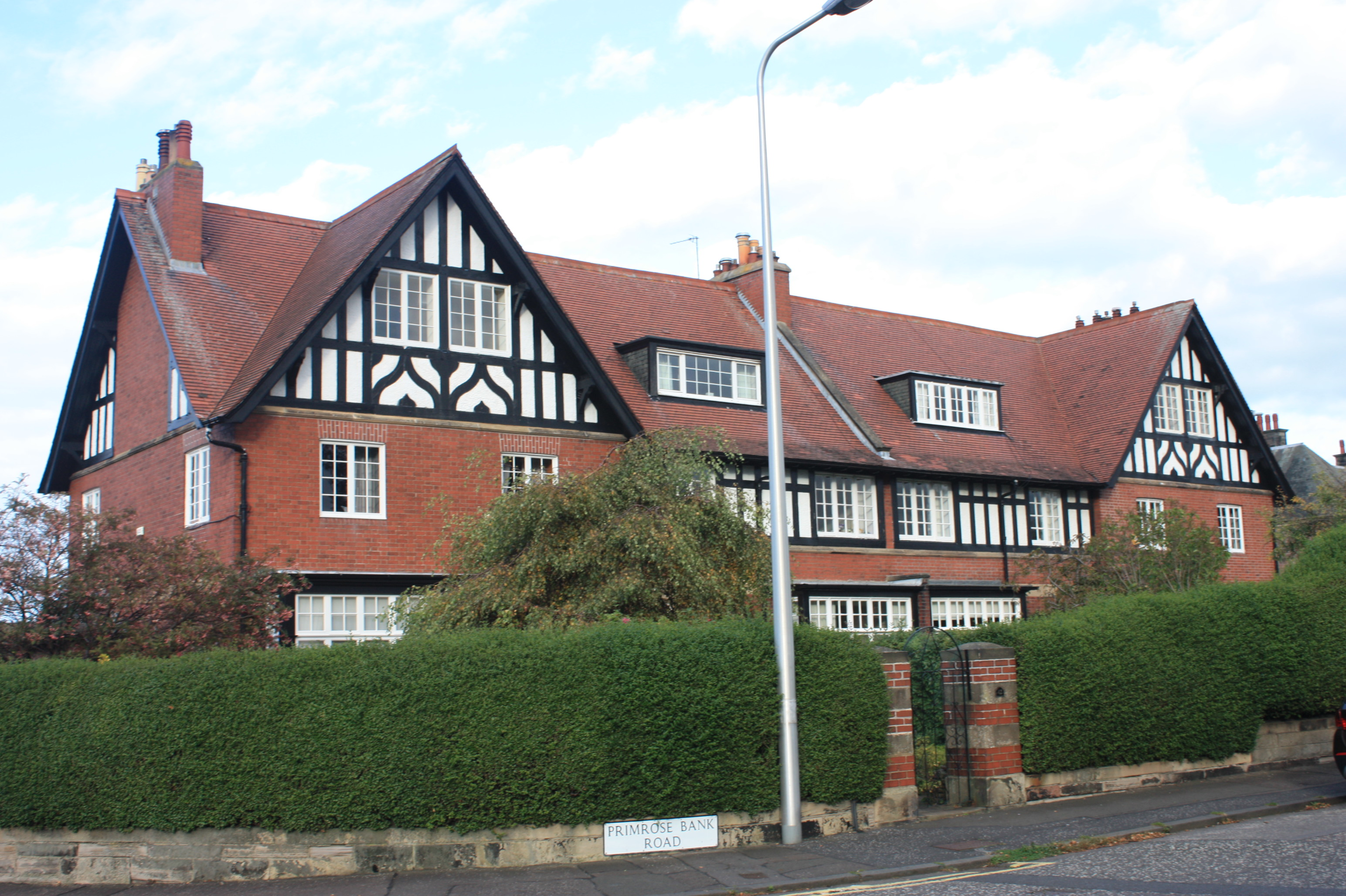
Villas by A H Crawford, Primrose Bank Road, Edinburgh

Alexander Hunter Crawford (1865–1945) was a Scottish architect and businessman. Closely associated with his father's firm of Crawford's Biscuits he designed many biscuit factories, and became owner of the company in 1931. Many of his villas are now listed buildings. His masterpiece (although somewhat "old-fashioned" for its date) is probably the huge Masonic Lodge on George Street in Edinburgh.

== Life ==
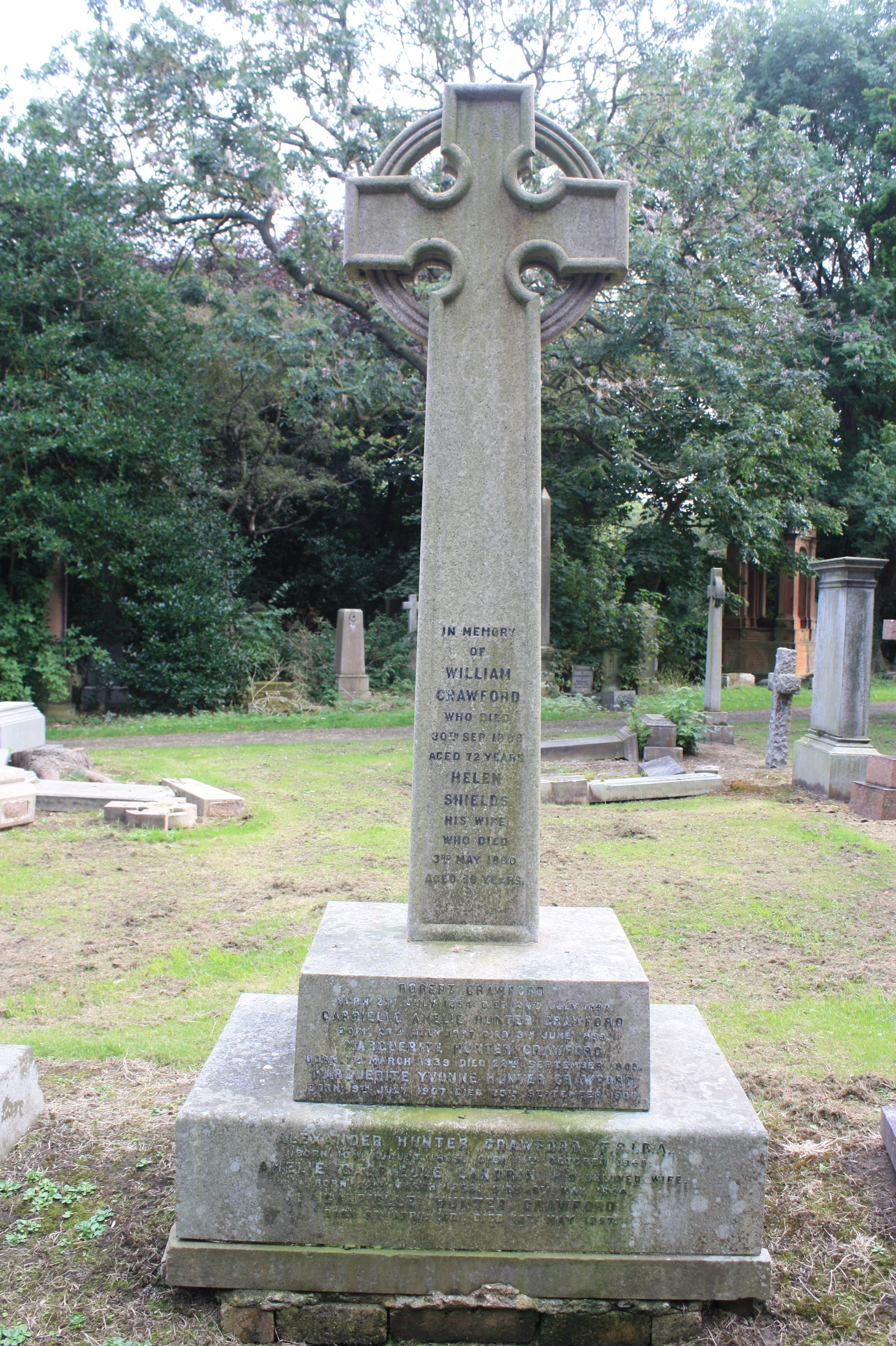
The grave of Alexander Hunter Crawford, Warriston Cemetery

He was born on 10 August 1865 in Leith, the harbour area of Edinburgh, the son of William Crawford, owner of Crawford's Biscuits. They lived at 6 Wellington Place on the west side of Leith Links. He was educated at Edinburgh Institution (now called Stewarts Melville College). In 1881 he was articled as a trainee architect to John Russell Walker, an Edinburgh architect based on Hanover Street in the New Town.

In 1886, he moved to London to work as assistant to Ralph Selden Wornum. In February 1891 he moved to work in the Architects Department of London County Council. In August 1891 he returned to Edinburgh to set up his own practice, based at 39 York Place, a Georgian townhouse. In 1898 he went into partnership with Frank Worthington Simon moving the office to 10 Randolph Place.

From 1902 to 1903 he was President of the Edinburgh Architectural Association. In 1912 he went into partnership with Henry Rochead Williamson (grandson of John Thomas Rochead) to create Crawford & Williamson. He retired from architecture in 1931 and moved to London to run the family biscuit company.

He died in London on 11 October 1945 but his body was returned to Edinburgh for burial in Warriston Cemetery with his siblings, and wife, Amelie Gabrielle Sandrin. The grave lies in the section to the north of the vaults. His older brother William Crawford (1858-1926) lies opposite. William inherited the biscuit company.

He left a huge estate of over £400,000 (partly from inheritance from his father and partly from his own efforts).

== Works ==
- Warehouse, Maritime Street/Maritime Lane, Leith (1891)
- Revoe Council School, Blackpool (1895)
- Crawford's Biscuit Factory, Leith (1896)
- Crawford's Biscuit Factory, Omoa, Lanarkshire (1896)
- Six houses on Primrose Bank Road, Trinity, Edinburgh (1895)
- Crawford's Biscuit Factory, Liverpool (1895)
- Tranent United Presbyterian Church (1896)
- Feuing of Braid estate, Edinburgh (1899)
- Feuing of the Fettes estate, Edinburgh (1899)
- Modernisation of Pollok House (1899)
- Dalmeny Street drill hall, Edinburgh (1900)
- Bonnycraig (villa near Peebles) (1902)
- Dunalister, villa in Colinton (1902)
- Inchinnan Parish Church Hall (1902)
- Alterations to Balmoral Castle (1902)
- North British Rubber Factory Offices (1903) - demolished 2015
- Murrayfield Parish Church, Ormidale Terrace, Edinburgh (1904)
- Villa, Marine Road, Dunbar (1905)
- Tidings Hill (villa in Bo'ness) (1908)
- Masonic Hall, George Street, Edinburgh (1909) one of the largest lodges in Britain
- Crawford's Biscuit Factory, Elbe Street, Leith (1935) - demolished 1995
