= Eden College Durban =

Coordinates: 29°52′25″S 30°58′48″E

- Durban, KwaZulu-Natal; South Africa

Information
- Type: Private co-ed school
- Established: 2007
- Locale: Urban
- Principal: Christa Booysens
- Exam board: NSC
- Grades: 000–12
- Enrollment: Under 500
- Houses: Kingfisher and Loerie
- Colors: Blue, white
- Website: www.edencollegedurban.co.za

Eden College Durban is an independent school for boys and girls located in Glenmore, Durban, KwaZulu-Natal, South Africa. It comprises a pre-primary school (grades 000 to 0), a preparatory school (grades 1 to 6), a middle school (grades 7 to 9) and a college (grades 10 to 12). Eden College Durban was previously called Crawford College, Durban until 2007 and Carmel College Durban before that. Eden College has just under 500 pupils.

== History ==
Eden Schools were established in Gauteng over 30 years ago.

The Chief Executive of Eden, Allan Zulberg, co-founded Eden in 1974. He played a leading role in the establishment of Midrand University and Educor. He was an executive director of Educor. He also was Chief Executive of King David Schools for a time. Zulberg taught Mathematics and Physical Science for many years, and was headmaster of Eden Lyndhurst.

Eden Schools operate in Lyndhurst, Randburg and Durban. Its head office is in Lyndhurst, Johannesburg. Joe Khouri is Chief Operating Officer, an educator, past principal and lecturer at Wits University. Allan Fehler is the group's Financial Director.

In 2007 Eden opened in Durban. The school was previously managed by Crawfordschools. The school operates a Pre-Primary, Preparatory, Middle School and College High School in Glenmore.

== Headmasters ==
=== Principals ===
- Christa Booysens 2023 -
- Karen Morrison 2018 -2022
- Christopher Marcellin (2008 – 2017)
- Barry Swain (2007 – 08)
