= Judge Crawford =

Judge Crawford may refer to:

- Geoffrey W. Crawford (born 1954), judge of the United States District Court for the District of Vermont
- Susan J. Crawford (born 1947), judge of the United States Court of Appeals for the Armed Forces
- William Crawford (judge) (1784–1849), judge of the United States District Courts for the Northern, Middle, and Southern Districts of Alabama

== See also ==
- Justice Crawford (disambiguation)
