= Royal Caledonian Society of South Australia =

The Royal Caledonian Society of South Australia was founded in Adelaide in 1881 as the South Australian Caledonian Society to promote Scottish culture and traditions in South Australia. It gained a Royal title in 1947 as a result of its fundraising activities during wartime.

== History ==
The Caledonian Society of South Australia was founded in 1881 by Scottish immigrants in the Province of South Australia with a desire to raise funds to support the people of the Shetland Islands following the Gloup Fishing Disaster. They announced that the society would be aimed to assist fellow Scottish people in the Province if they struggled in farming and would order no discrimination on the grounds of nationality, religion or creed. Foundation members included A. W. Dobbie and Patrick Gay. The Society's associated bagpipes and drums band was founded in 1884.

The Society became a formally incorporated organisation in 1911 and in 1947, it was granted a Royal title by King George VI in gratitude for the Society's fundraising activities in Australia during the Second World War. In the 21st century, the Royal Caledonian Society's pipes and drums band have performed at the Royal Edinburgh Military Tattoo. They often participate in South Australian Anzac Day dawn services.

== Chiefs ==
Below is a list of all the heads of the Society (colloquially called Chiefs):

- 1881–1883 Alexander Hay MLC.
- 1883–1885 Dr. Allan Campbell MLC.
- 1885–1886 Hon. Sir J. Lancelot Stirling
- 1886–1887 Hon. James Henderson Howe MLC.
- 1887–1888 David Murray
- 1888–1891 Aloysius MacDonald
- 1891–1892 Hugh Fraser
- 1892–1894 Hon. John Darling MLC.
- 1894–1895 Aloysius MacDonald
- 1895–1897 Hon. A. Wallace Sandford MLC.
- 1897–1899 John Wyles JP.
- 1899–1902 A. J. McLachlan
- 1902–1903 G. Fowler Stewart
- 1903–1904 P. D. Haggart
- 1904–1907 John Darling Jr.
- 1907–1909 John Wood Sandford
- 1909–1914 Robert Weymss
- 1914–1917 George McEwin
- 1917–1918 John Drummond
- 1918–1921 J. W. Hill
- 1921–1923 Duncan Fraser SM.
- 1924–1925 James W. McGregor
- 1925–1928 Andrew Douglas Young
- 1928–1930 John Tassie, brother of Henry Tassie
- 1930–1933 Hon. Sir David J. Gordon MLC.
- 1933–1936 Maxwell A. Fotheringham
- 1936–1938 Hon. Sir George Ritchie, KCMG
- 1938–1940 C. B. Anderson ISO
- 1940–1943 Capt. Duncan Menzies
- 1943–1945 John McLeay
- 1945–1949 Andrew Small
- 1949–1952 F. R. Forgan JP.
- 1952–1954 J. McGregor Soutar
- 1954–1959 Norman H. Campbell
- 1959–1968 Sir Lyell McEwin KBE., MLC.
- 1968–1971 Clarrie Martin
- 1971–1980 Charles Gardiner
- 1980–1983 Ron A. Layton
- 1983–1985 Donaldina Nicolson Richards
- 1985–1986 Dr. Gordon C. Greig MB MRCGP
- 1987–1989 Marian Macaulay Johnson
- 1989–1993 William Paterson
- 1993–1995 Jeffrey C. McFarlane
- 1995–2000 J. Lennox Pawson JP.
- 2000–2003 Ann Calver (née Lumsden)
- 2003–2004 Jim D. Wallace
- 2004–2007 David Porteous
- 2007–2010 Anne Miller
- 2010–2012 Christina Forbes Cockerill
- 2012–present (2015) Roselee Bruce

== Activities ==
The Caledonian Society commissioned W. J. Maxwell to produce the statue of Robert Burns on North Terrace, which was unveiled on 5 May 1894. They commissioned James White to produce the statue of John McDouall Stuart in Victoria Square commemorating his crossing of the continent in 1861–1862. The statue, paid for by public subscription and the South Australian Government, was unveiled on 4 June 1904.
