= Crawford, Alabama =

Crawford, Alabama may refer to the following places in Alabama:

- Crawford, Mobile County, Alabama
- Crawford, Russell County, Alabama
