= Andrew Douglas Young =

Australian accountant and stockbroker

Andrew Douglas Young (1881 – 22 June 1950), commonly referred to as A. D. Young, was an accountant and stockbroker in South Australia.

== History ==
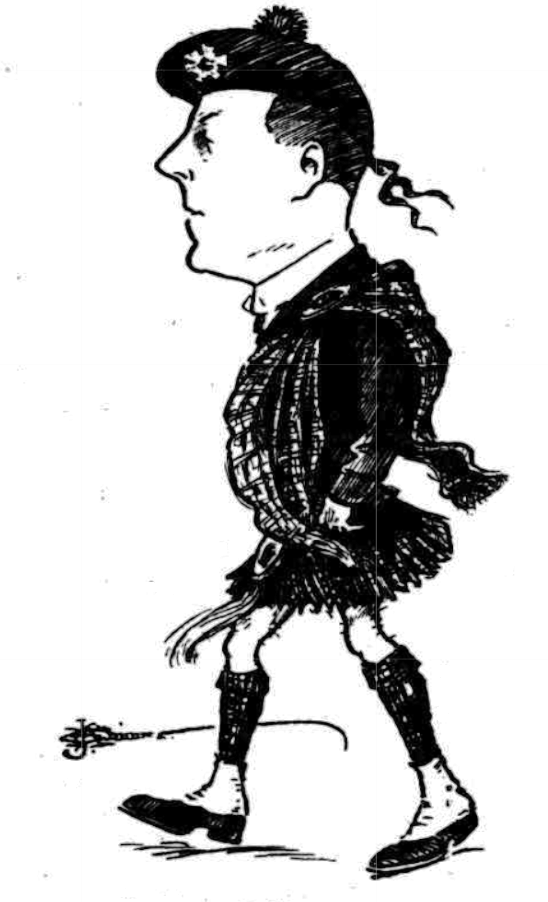
caricature by J. H. Chinner

Young was born at Eaglehawk, Bendigo, in 1881. He left for Adelaide to take up a position of manager for Walkley & Davies, and in 1913 entered business as a stockbroker on his own account. He was elected a member of the Adelaide Stock Exchange in 1909 and to the committee in 1922. He was elected chairman of the Adelaide Stock Exchange in 1932 and held the post until 1948, when he retired. He was appointed a director of the State Bank of South Australia in 1934 on account of his intimate knowledge of financial dealings, and his advice was sought by all sections of the business community, including forensic examination of stockbrokers' books.

Young was a keen member of the South Australian Caledonian Society, and was auditor and secretary of the society for many years. He was elected Chief in 1925, and held that post until 1928. He was a prominent Freemason, and Grand Master of the South Australian Grand Lodge of Freemasons 1939–1941 and 1944–1946.

He was an avid sportsman, having in his younger days played football and cricket, and in later years played bowls as a prominent member of the St Peters club. He was appointed president of the Australian Bowls Council in 1949, and it was while representing Australia at a bowls tournament in Edinburgh that he collapsed and died.
