= Edamalaipatti Pudur =

Edamalaipatti Pudur - இடமலைப்பட்டி புதூர் எடமலைப்பட்டி புதூர்
- Neighbourhood
- Nickname: E. Pudur
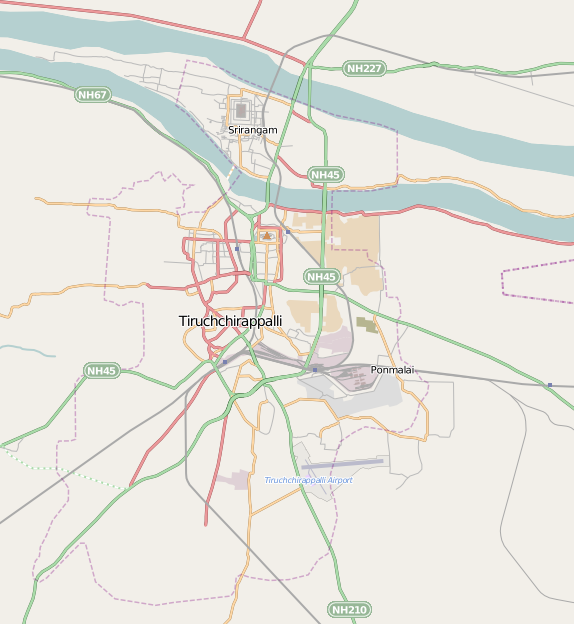
- Location within Tiruchirapalli
- Coordinates: 10°46′20″N 78°40′4″E
- Country: India
- State: Tamil Nadu
- District: Tiruchirappalli

Government
  - Type: Ponmalai/K.Abishekapuram

Area
  - Total: 1.9 sq mi (5 km^{2})
- Elevation: 289 ft (88 m)
- Time zone: UTC+5:30 (IST)
- PIN: 620012
- Vehicle registration: TN 45, TN 48
- Website: www.trichycorporation.gov.in

Edamalaipatti Pudur or E.Pudur is a large residential neighbourhood and extension of Tiruchirappalli in Tamil Nadu, India. Surrounded by KK Nagar to East, Karumandapam to West, Crawford to North & Panjapur to South. The areas has amenities such as Popular Temples, hospitals, smart mediequip services, Pazhamudircholai, tailors, flour mills, schools and petrol stations.

== Locality ==
Edamalaipatti Pudur is located on Madurai Main Road (NH45B) 3.5 km from Trichy Central Bus Stand & 3 km from Trichy Railway Station. Tiruchirappalli Corporation wards 39 and 40 and some of 41st wards covers this area and falls under Tiruchirappalli West Taluk. It has a police station with an important limits within Panjapur, Pirattiyur, Crawford under it wings. Major residential areas of Edamalaipatti Pudur includes Sozhiya Vellalar Street (Selva Vinayakar Kovil Street), RMS colony (North, south Extn.), State Bank colony, Pappa colony, Nallathanni Keni Street, Sakthivel Colony, Kalliyamman Kovil street, Anbil Dharmalinga Nagar, Arasu Colony, Francina colony, Pillayar Kovil street, Nehru street, Anthoniyar Kovil street, New Street, New Colony, KRS Nagar, Kollankulam, Bharathi Nagar, Petrol Bunk Road. Ramachandra Nagar, Nathar Nagar, Srinivasa Nagar, Rajiv Gandhi Nagar, MGR Nagar, Health Colony, Anbilar Nagar, Anjali Nagar, Stalin Nagar, Thylammai Nagar, Gangai Nagar, Murugan Nagar, Khadhi Kraft colony, Chettiyapatti, Dhobi Colony, Padugai, Krishnapuram, Kutti Malai, Rettai Malai (connects Pirattiyur).

== Demographics ==
Most of the residents are bankers, business people, teachers and clerical workers. The area has an equal combination of middle-class and upper middle-class. The Sozhiya Vellalar community is the majority in this area. The Kaliyamman Kovil festival and rettai malai onedi karuppu temple aadi festival is quite popular, and people from all over Trichy Throng to E-Pudur to attend this festival celebration.
