= Col. Crawford Burn Site Monument =

- Colonel Crawford Burn Site Monument
- U.S. National Register of Historic Places
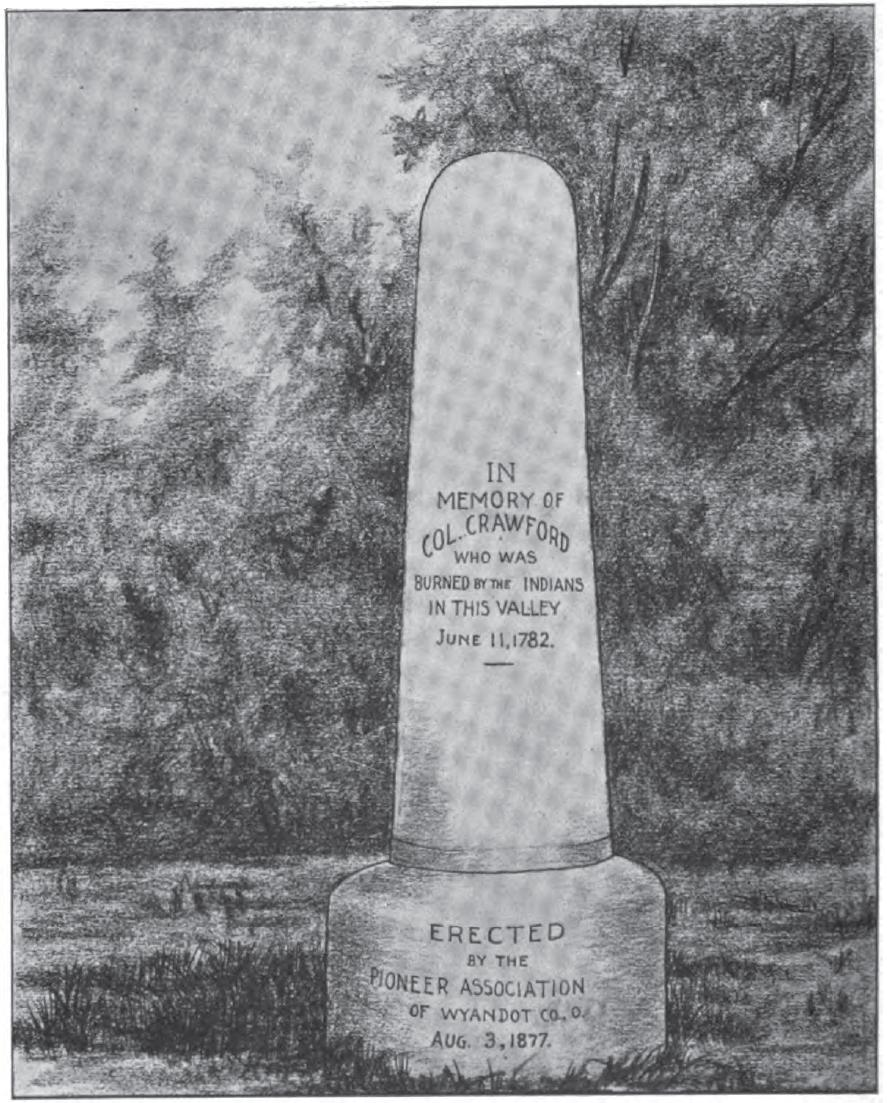
- Artist's rendition of the monument

- Location within Ohio Location within the United States
- Location: Northeast of Crawford, Ohio
- Coordinates: 40°55′23″N 83°20′4″W
- Built: 1877
- Architect: John Wyandot
- NRHP reference No.: 82003667
- Added to NRHP: April 15, 1982

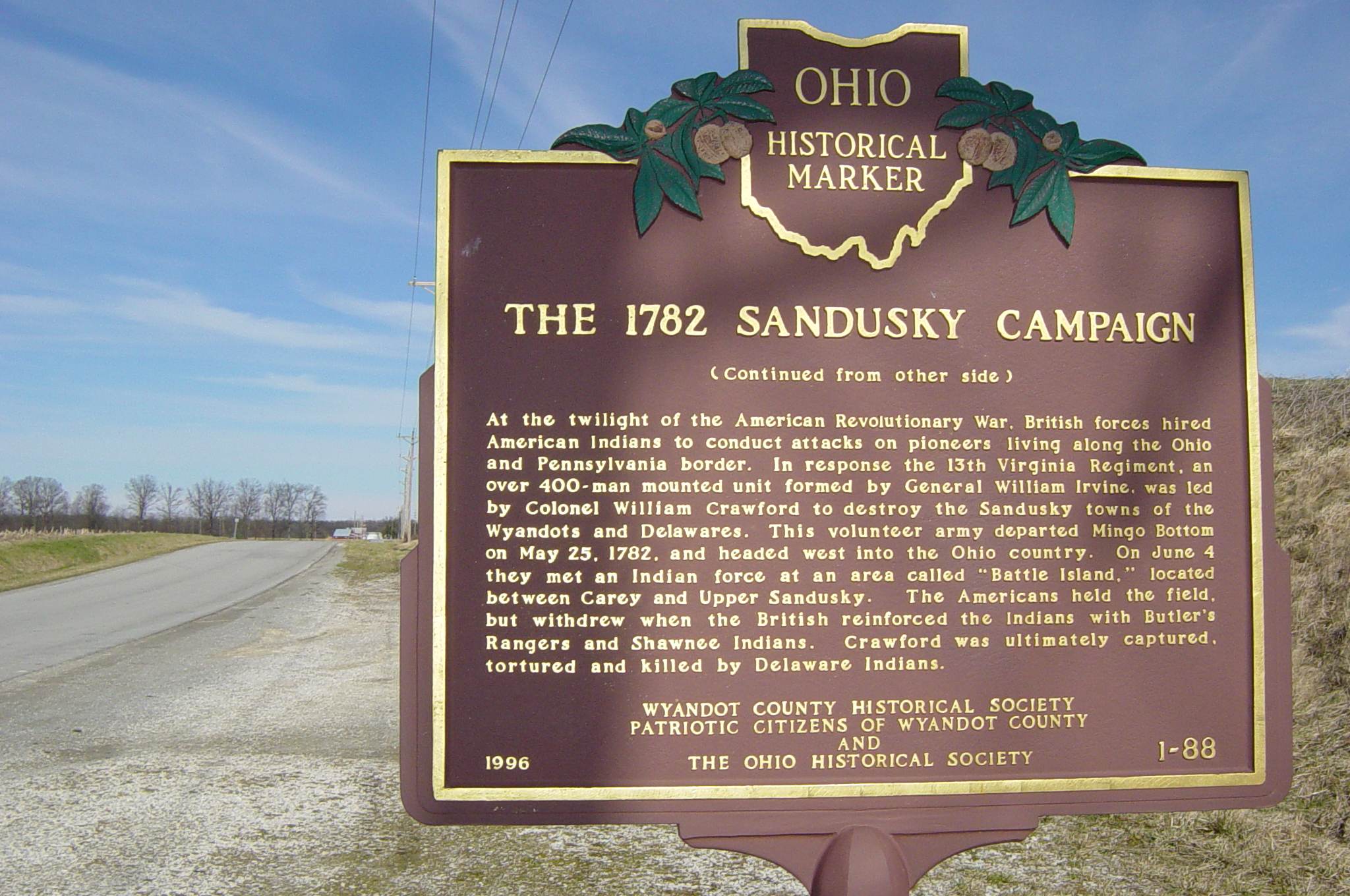
The Ohio Historical Society's marker near the Colonel Crawford Burn Site

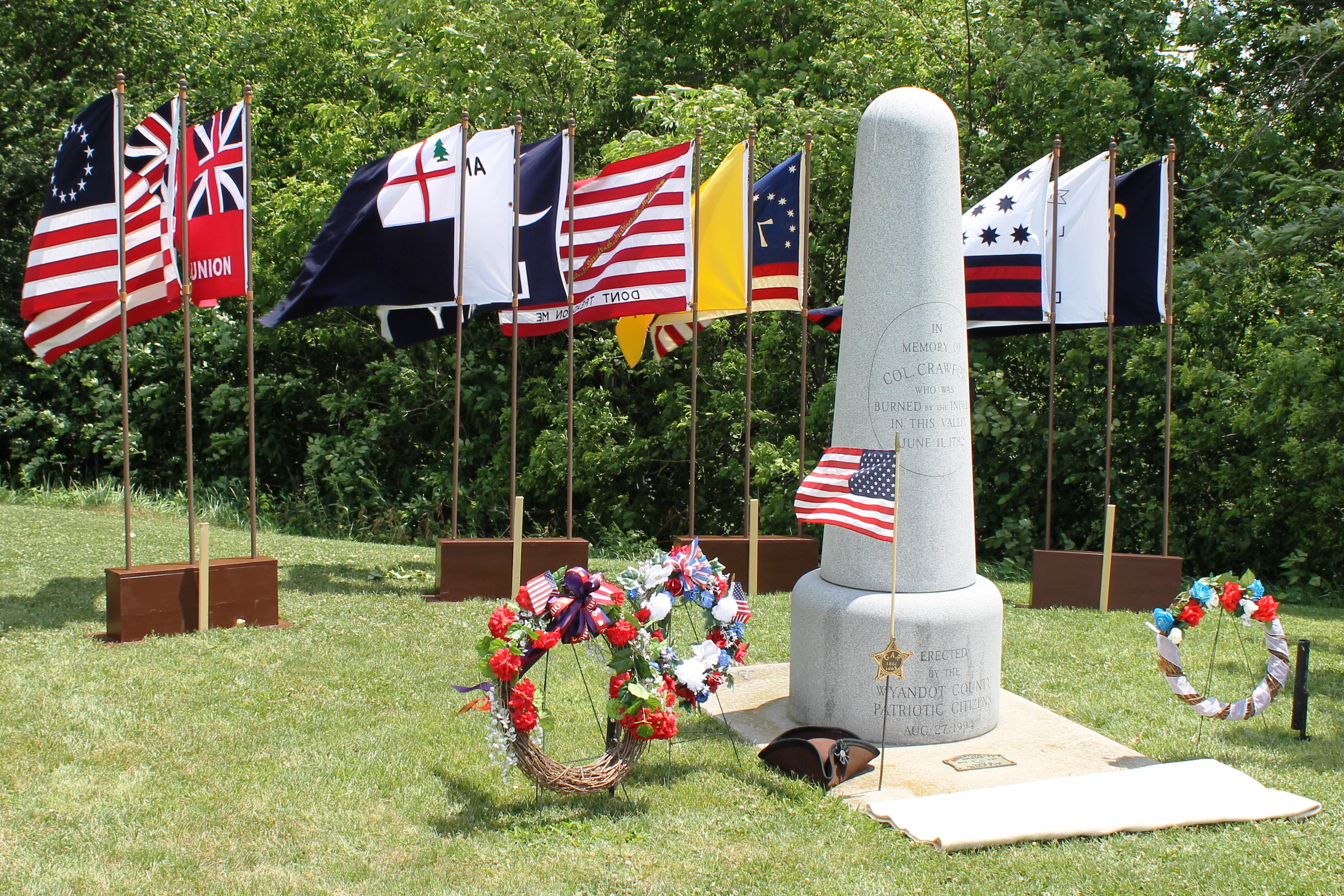
Crawford Burn Site Monument (230th Anniversary Commemoration of the Battle of Sandusky)

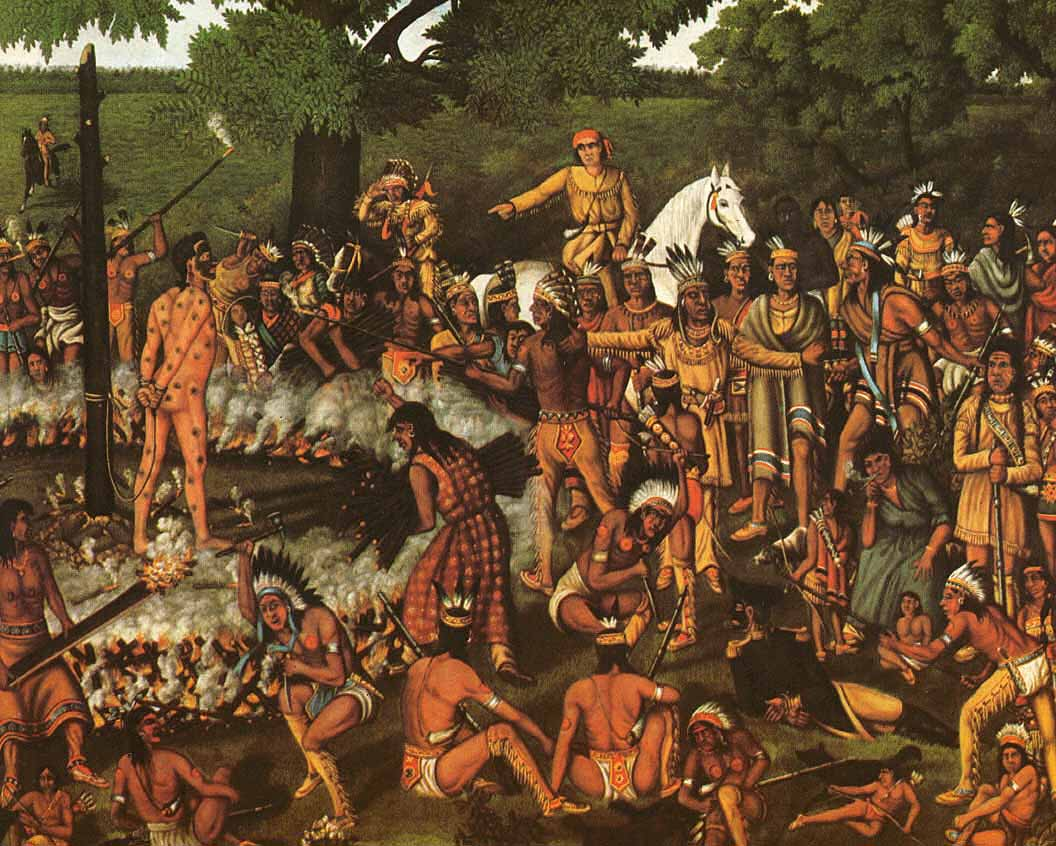
Execution of Crawford

The Colonel Crawford Burn Site Monument is a war monument in rural Wyandot County, Ohio, United States. Placed in the 1870s, it commemorates the death by burning of Colonel William Crawford during the concluding years of the American Revolution. The stone monument itself was long the subject of local interest, and it has been named a historic site.

As the end of the American Revolution approached, warfare continued in the backcountry of modern Ohio; British-allied Indians continued to harass the American settlers. In 1782, a regiment of Virginia soldiers was sent in reprisal to destroy Indian villages on the Sandusky River, under the command of William Crawford, a friend of victorious General George Washington. However, the Crawford expedition ended on June 4 after a skirmish south of modern-day Carey, and the Americans retreated. Colonel Crawford was captured by the Indians after the battle, and seven days later he was tortured and burned at the stake on the banks of Tymochtee Creek in present-day northeastern Wyandot County.

As the centenary of the burning approached, a movement arose to commemorate Crawford's death with a monument. The movement's proponents were aroused by a strong sense of the incident's importance: besides being the earliest major event in Wyandot County history, it was the county's most prominent event of all time in their opinion. One of the county's leading lawyers, Curtis Berry, originated the idea of marking the site. The marker is made of sandstone from Berea, Ohio, worked in the shape of a cannon and cut approximately 8.5 feet (2.6 m) tall. Local labor at B.L. Bauscher's firm in Upper Sandusky performed the stone cutting during the middle of 1877, and the monument was dedicated later in the year. The dedication ceremony saw thousands of people in attendance. For many years, the local Pioneer Association hosted an annual Pioneer Picnic at the monument, until the deaths of older residents and the apathy of younger residents saw the demise of the event in 1935. Interest returned in the 1970s: locals opposed the construction of a proposed electric transmission line by the site, and it became a popular location for school field trips.

In April 1982, the monument was listed on the National Register of Historic Places, qualifying because of its connection to Crawford; it is one of ten such locations in Wyandot County. Commemorative monuments are typically ineligible for National Register listing, and sites such as the Crawford Burn Site Monument can qualify only if the markers themselves have become historically significant.
