= Kirkala =

Pastoral lease in South Australia

Coordinates: 32.75°S 134.322°E

Location in South Australia

Kirkala Station is a pastoral lease that operates as a sheep station in South Australia.

It is situated about 12 kilometres (7 mi) east of Streaky Bay and 112 kilometres (70 mi) north west of Wudinna on the Eyre Peninsula.

The unusual name is Aboriginal in origin and is the word for the pig face plant that grows in the area.

The property was established at some time prior to 1858 when Hugh Archibald Crawford quit his grocery business into take up Kirkala which he took up with his brother-in-law James Munro Linklater. Crawford was later appointed Justice of the Peace for Streaky Bay?

In 1868 the property was placed on the market along with neighbouring Hope Downs Station. Together they occupied an area of 270 square miles (699 km^{2}) and were stocked with approximately 11,100 sheep. The properties boasted an eight bedroom stone homestead, a cottage, store, huts and stable along with 12 wells to water stock.

The Linklater family acquired sole ownership of the property in late 1868. Spottiswood Montgomery acquired Kirkala in 1892.

The main station, including the homestead, school/shearers' dining room, stables, blacksmith's shop and cottage, as well as an outstation with a two-roomed cottage, external bakehouse and underground tank, are both listed on the South Australian Heritage Register.

== See also ==
- List of ranches and stations
