= UThongathi School =

Coordinates: 29°35′31″S 31°09′18″E

uThongathi School was a high school near oThongathi, KwaZulu-Natal, South Africa. The school opened in January 1986.

The school was the first nonracial school established by the New Era Schools Trust (NEST). It opened with 107 pupils of all races.

Addressing the first assembly of the school the principal, Mr Richard Thompson, said: "Today we are the only school in South Africa which is truly nonracial. The whole of South Africa will be watching us very carefully because we are doing something completely new. Today we are starting a new era in education in South Africa. A school where the colour of your skin is completely unimportant. We are trying to set an example for South Africa and we want to prove that this is how education must be, if South Africa is ever going to be a peaceful country."

The campus was bought by Graeme Crawford in 1997 and a new school named Crawford College, North Coast was established on the site in the same year.
