= John Darling and Son =

Australian wheat and milling company

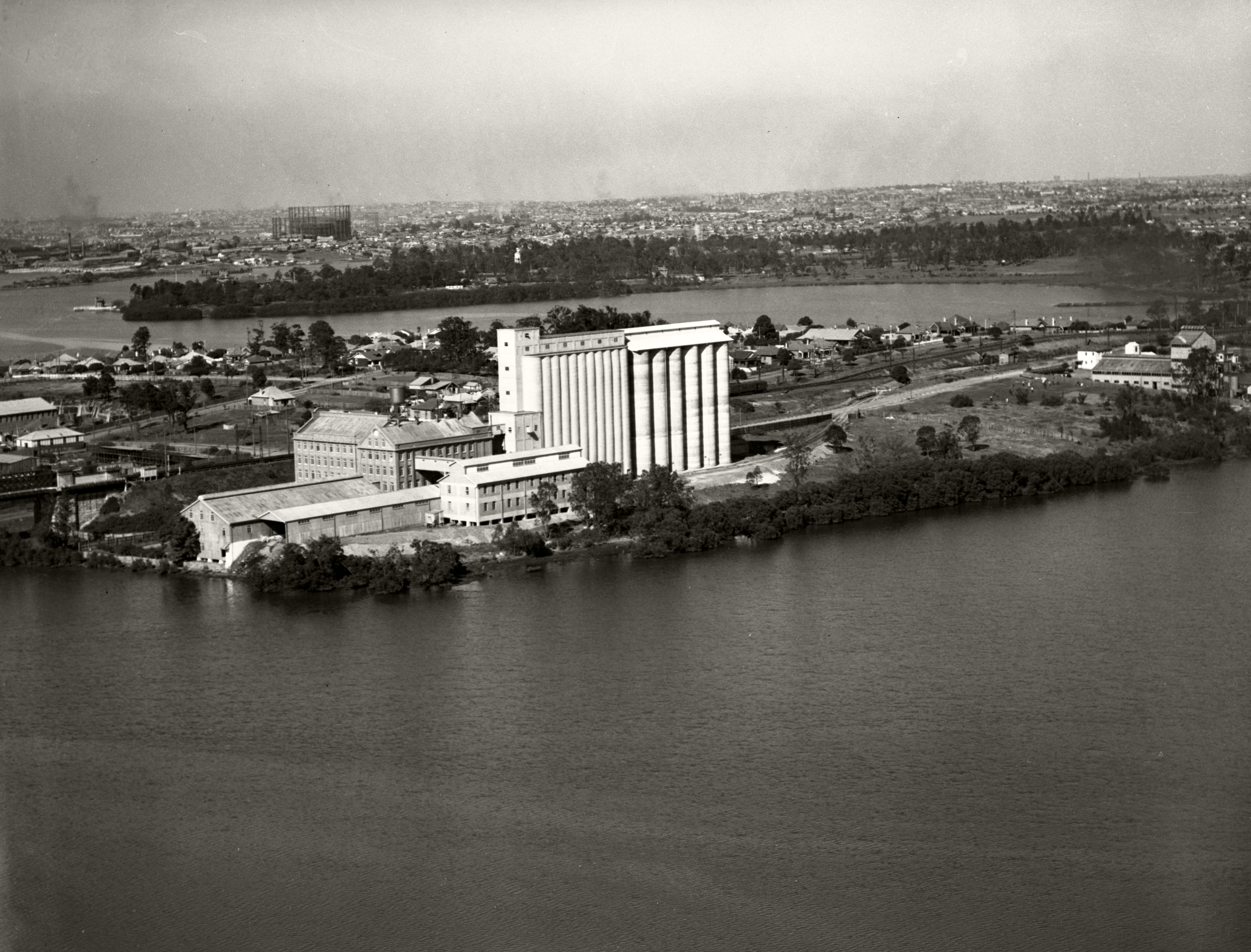
- The company's mill in Rhodes, Sydney
- Type: Private company
- Industry: Agriculture; Manufacturing; Transport
- Founded: 1865; 161 years ago in Adelaide, South Australia
- Founder: John Darling Sr.
- Defunct: 1962
- Fate: Private sale
- Successor: Allied Mills
- Key people: John Darling Sr.; John Darling, Jr.; Harold Gordon Darling; Norman Darling; Leonard Darling; Leonard Gordon Darling
- Products: Wheat merchandise; Flour milling; Shipping

John Darling and Son was an Australian wheat merchant and flour milling company founded in Adelaide, South Australia, for many years the largest in Australia.

It was founded by John Darling Sr. (1831–1905), a businessman of Scottish origin, and his eldest son, John Darling, Jr. (1852–1914), and then by Harold Gordon Darling. It was registered as a private company in Victoria in 1953 with three directors: Norman Darling, Leonard Darling, and Leonard Gordon Darling.

In 1962 John Darling and Son (Aust) Ltd. was acquired by Allied Mills, which was taken over by Fielder Gillespie Davis Limited in 1986.

== Darling family ==
=== First generation ===
==== Early years in Scotland ====
John Darling (23 February 1831 – 10 April 1905) was born in Edinburgh, Scotland, in 1831, second son of John Darling of Duns, into a family of modest means, and was educated at George Heriot's School. His father died when he was ten years, and he was forced to leave school, aged eleven years. His first job was as an office boy at the printing shop of Balfour & Jack, but lost that job after six or eight weeks. He next worked at Duncan Sinclair and Sons' type foundry "Whitford House", then at Alexander Wilson & Son, followed by James Marr, Gallie, & Co., where he worked for about 12 years. Several of his friends, including Alexander Dowie and Joseph Ferguson – later an owner of The Register – had emigrated to South Australia in 1851, and realising the lack of opportunities for advancement in Edinburgh, decided to follow them. He was not a wealthy man, and did not qualify for assisted passage, so it took some time before they emigrated.

==== Establishment of flour milling in Adelaide ====
Early in 1855 John Darling Sr., his wife and two sons arrived at Semaphore, South Australia in the "Isabella", sailing from Leith. Four days later he was working in the Rundle Street store of Berry & Gall. This job did not last long, but through a friend he soon found employment with baker Robert Birrell of Grenfell Street. This job lasted two years before he left to earn a living with a horse and cart, and at the same time helped set up his wife in a store adjacent to the Stag Inn on Rundle Street. This failed to attract much custom so they built a shop "Millbrook Store" on Glen Osmond Road, which slowly became profitable. Meanwhile, he had been approached by James Smith, of Giles & Smith, Waymouth Street who had a flour mill on West Terrace and in the five years in their employ learned the wheat and flour business. He then resigned from Giles and Smith, and in 1865 was trading independently. In 1867 he took over the sole management of the grain stores in Waymouth Street formerly owned by R. G. Bowen (later to become the factory of D & W. Murray).

In 1872 he made his eldest son John Darling Jr. a partner in the business, thereafter known as John Darling & Son, millers, grain, and general merchants. For thirty years the business grew steadily, the "Grain King" setting up branches throughout South Australia's wheat belt, buying up flour mills then establishing agencies in Melbourne in 1880 and London, his company handling most of Australia's export grain.

John Darling Sr. retired from the business in October 1897, and he died of sudden heart failure at the family home "Thurloo" on Kent Terrace, Kent Town.

=== Second generation ===
In October 1897, John Darling Jr. became the sole proprietor. Under his leadership the company purchased the Eclipse flour mills, Port Adelaide, and the goodwill of J. Dunn and Co. in ???. He founded a hay-compressing business in Gawler, near the railway station. John Darling, Jr. died in a Melbourne private hospital on 27 March 1914. He had been in that city a few days to chair a meeting of BHP, when he took ill.

=== Third generation ===
John Darling Jr. had four sons:

- Joe Darling CBE (21 November 1870 – 2 January 1946), an Australian cricket captain from 1897 to 1905, farmer, and subsequently a Tasmanian politician
- Alexander John Darling, also known as John Darling III (1878 – 1896), fell out of a tree at the age of 18 and broke his back and his brother Harold took upon the responsibilities of the running of the business with brother Leonard
- Harold Gordon Darling (9 June 1885 – 26 January 1950), during his time the family business was transferred from Adelaide to Melbourne, with flour mills at Albion in Melbourne and Rhodes in Sydney; also a long-serving director and chairman of BHP
- Leonard (1891 – )

Darling also had four daughters.

==== Other relatives ====
Leonard Gordon Darling AC CMG, known as Gordon, was Harold Gordon Darling's nephew. He was a businessman and philanthropist who helped to fund the National Portrait Gallery in Canberra.

== Business operations ==
=== Albion flour mill site ===
Albion flour mill site
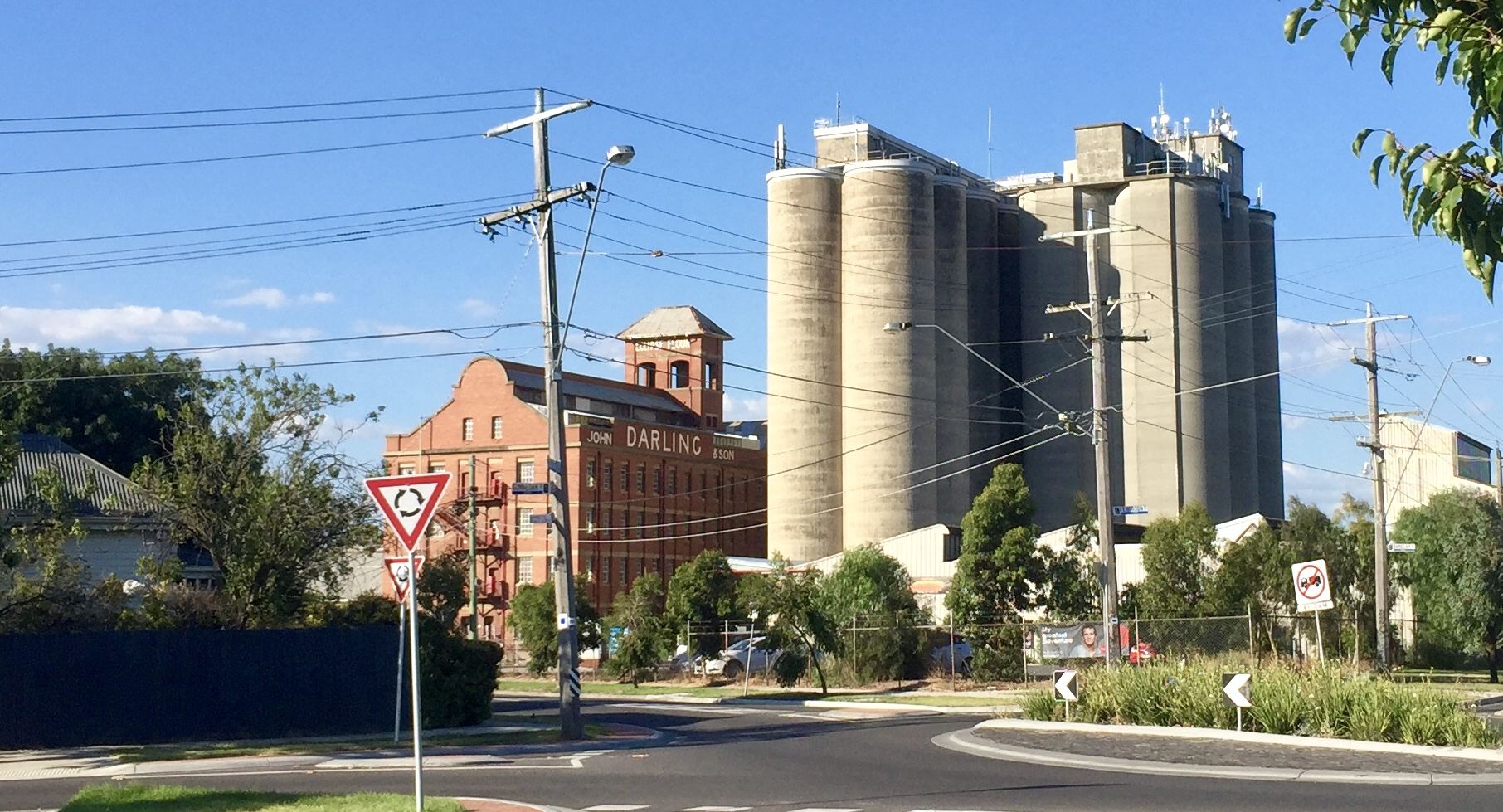
- The former flour mill in Albion, in 2017

- Location of the former flour mill in Greater Metropolitan Melbourne
- Interactive map of the Albion flour mill site area

General information
- Status: Complete; closed
- Type: Flour mill (former)
- Architectural style: Inter-war Stripped Classical
- Location: 74 Sydney Street, Albion, City of Brimbank, Melbourne, Victoria, Australia
- Coordinates: 37°46′40″S 144°49′25″E
- Year built: 1922–1973
- Completed: 1926; 100 years ago
- Opened: 10 July 1922
- Closed: 1990
- Client: John Darling and Son

Technical details
- Material: Reinforced concrete; red bricks

Victorian Heritage Register
- Official name: John Darling and Son Flour Mill
- Type: Registered place
- Criteria: a., d., h.
- Designated: 23 January 1991
- Reference no.: H0829
- Heritage overlay no.: HO4
- Category: Manufacturing and Processing

The John Darling and Son Flour Mill is a heritage-listed former flour mill and associated buildings, located at 74 Sydney Street in Albion, in the City of Brimbank, in the western suburbs of Melbourne, in Victoria. The Albion flour mill site is a former industrial complex that included a T-shaped red brick mill building with four main stories, basement, attic and tower, a timber and iron storehouse, rail sidings, loading platform and canopy, built between 1926 and 1927 in the Inter-war Stripped Classical style; and reinforced concrete silo blocks, built in 1939 and 1973.

Built on the traditional lands of the Wurundjeri people, the flour mill was added to the Victorian Heritage Register on 23 January 1991 in recognition of its architectural and historical significance; and was also added to a non-statutory list by the Victorian branch of the National Trust on 18 June 1990.

==== Site history ====
John Darling & Son purchased the Albion site in 1921 and opened their new roller mill on 10 July 1922. They purchased the site from Hugh Victor McKay, machinery manufacturer, who was well known as the owner of the nearby Sunshine Harvester Works. From early in its history, the mill operated night and day as the Darling family continued to make inroads into the flour export trade. Disaster struck in February 1926 when the mill building was destroyed by fire. It was announced the day after the fire, however, that the mill would be rebuilt. The rebuilding program commenced that same year and the new mill was completed and operational by 1927. This mill remains extant. The adjacent grainstore building was also constructed at this time in association with the mill building, as well as the rail sidings, loading platform and canopy.

Between 1927 and 1990 when the mill ceased operation, various buildings and features were added and removed from the complex as the needs of the mill operation changed and new technologies were developed. An MMBW plan of 1934 indicated the existence of three major buildings on the site during the first decade after the rebuilding of the mill in 1926, including the T-shaped brick mill building, the timber and iron grain store to the north, and a detached wheat storage-shed to the south (since demolished). Smaller structures included an amenities block to the north, water tank and pump house (all since demolished). Later additions to the site can be seen in a 1989 plan of the mill complex.

From 1939, additional buildings/features included the following:

- Reinforced concrete silos built 1939 and 1973, adjacent to the mill building;
- Office and laboratory of 1951 fronting Sydney Street;
- Former workshop, 1960s, modified 1981 and 2013,fronting Ferguson Street;
- Five steel flour bins added to the site in 1969, 1970 and 1984, adjacent to the mill building;
- Office building of 1971 fronting Sydney Street;
- Locker room of 1971 fronting Sydney Street;
- Maintenance Depot fronting Ferguson Street 1981.

Of this list above, only the reinforced concrete silos built 1939 and 1973 and the building fronting Ferguson Street remain at the site, with other buildings at the site cleared from c. 2013.

=== Shipping ===
In 1884 the company had Murdoch and Murray, of Port Glasgow build the coastal steamer Jessie Darling to carry grain from the ports of South Australia to Adelaide and Melbourne. An image of the ship may be seen here. The Jessie Darling was involved in a number of marine accidents; the most serious being a bizarre sequence of events on the morning of 21 April 1907. Around 2am the four-masted barque Norma, loaded with wheat, was lying at the Semaphore anchorage off Outer Harbor, awaiting a favourable wind, when it was struck by the steamer Ardencraig, inbound with merchandise from London. Both vessels sank, with one crew member drowned. Hours later, in broad daylight, the Jessie Darling, loaded with wheat from Smoky Bay, struck the wreck of the Norma and sank. On 4 May the inbound steamer Port Chalmers ran into the submerged wrecks and suffered some damage. At the inquest, Capt. Thomas of the Ardencraig asserted that a sudden rain squall had obscured the Norma, and the crew backed his statement. The story was not believed, but couldn't be disproved; Thomas never again had such a responsible position. Years later a story emerged that the lights of the Norma actually had been seen but the Ardencraig could not be halted due to the topping maul (a mallet used for quick release of anchor chains etc.) being misplaced, and the anchors could not be dropped in time.

The Jessie Darling was refloated in January 1908 repaired and put back in service in November. Meanwhile, the Grace Darling had been purchased as her replacement went into service in March 1908.

The Templemore, a ship he chartered to carry wheat to Britain was wrecked in 1893.

An infamous South Australian wreck was that of the SS Clan Ranald in Investigator Strait west of Troubridge Point in 1909, when 30 men were drowned. She was also carrying John Darling's wheat.

In 1890 the Jessie Darling took part in a profitable salvage operation – from the wreck of the Glenrosa. As the Coorabie with an oil engine, it was still doing useful work in 1940.

Other ships owned by the company were the Palmerston and the Emu. and the Avoca.

== See also ==
- List of Australian flour millers and merchants
- Manufacturing in Australia
- Food production in Australia
- Transport in Australia
