= Mount Crawford =

Mount Crawford is the name of several places in the world including:

- Mount Crawford (Antarctica)
- Mount Crawford (New Hampshire) in the US White Mountains
- Mount Crawford (New Zealand) on the Miramar Peninsula near Wellington
- Mount Crawford (South Australia) a hill in the Mount Lofty Ranges of Australia
  - Mount Crawford, South Australia, a locality containing the hill
- Mount Crawford, Virginia, a town in the United States of America
