= William Darling =

William Darling may refer to:

- William Augustus Darling (1817–1895), American politician
- William S. Darling (1882–1964), Hungarian-born art director
- William Darling (politician) (1885–1962), UK politician
- William Scott Darling (1898–1951), Canadian-American scriptwriter
- William Lafayette Darling (1856–1938), American consulting engineer
