= Crawford, Ohio =

Unincorporated community in Ohio, United States

Coordinates: 40°55′11″N 83°20′32″W

Crawford is an unincorporated community in Wyandot County, in the U.S. state of Ohio.

== History ==
A post office was established at Crawford in 1838, and remained in operation until 1920. The community was named for William Crawford (1732–1782), a soldier in American Revolutionary War who was burnt at the stake by Indians nearby.

== See also ==
- Col. Crawford Burn Site Monument
