= Crawford Bay, Western Australia =

Bay in Western Australia

Coordinates: 16°30′S 123°28′E

Crawford Bay is a bay in Australia located in the north of Western Australia, located about 97 kilometres (60 mi) from Broome.
