= Pirattiyur =

Town in Tiruchirappalli district, Tamil Nadu, India

Coordinates: 10°48′N 78°39′E

- Interactive map of Pirattiyur

Pirattiyur is a locality in the city of Tiruchirappalli, located in Tiruchirappalli West taluk, Tamil Nadu, India. A former panchayat, it includes the neighborhood of Edamalaipatti Pudur, and was merged with the Tiruchirappalli City Municipal Corporation in 1994. The area serves as the location of the Tiruchirappalli West Regional Transport Office.

The famous Rettai Malai Temple is located nearby Pirattiyur and has a festival annually. Pirattiyur people and people from Madurai, Tirunelveli, and Thoothukudi also attend this festival. This Rettai Malai connects Edamalaipatti Pudur Trichy with Pirattiyur.
