= Crawford County =

Crawford County is the name of eleven counties in the United States:

- Crawford County, Arkansas
- Crawford County, Georgia
- Crawford County, Illinois
- Crawford County, Indiana
- Crawford County, Iowa
- Crawford County, Kansas
- Crawford County, Michigan
- Crawford County, Missouri
- Crawford County, Ohio
- Crawford County, Pennsylvania
- Crawford County, Wisconsin
