= Crawfordville =

Crawfordville may refer to the following places in the United States:

- Crawfordville, Florida
- Crawfordville, Georgia

== See also ==
- Crawfordsville (disambiguation)
