= Justice Crawford =

Justice Crawford may refer to:

- Geoffrey W. Crawford (born 1954), associate justice of the Vermont Supreme Court
- Martin J. Crawford (1820–1883), associate justice of the Supreme Court of Georgia
- Samuel Crawford (jurist) (1820–1861), associate justice of the Wisconsin Supreme Court
- Susan M. Crawford (born 1965), associate justice of the Wisconsin Supreme Court

== See also ==
- Judge Crawford (disambiguation)
