= Alexander Dowie =

Australian businessman

Alexander Dowie (4 September 1827 – 18 July 1909) was an 1851 emigrant from Scotland to South Australia. He is known as a businessman, who developed a major footwear manufacturing, tannery, and retail store in Adelaide.

== Early life and education ==
Dowie was born in 1827, the third son of John Dowie (26 November 1800 – c. 1832) and his wife Margaret Dowie (born 1 August 1802). He had a younger brother, John Murray Dowie. His father and sister died when he was around four years old. Later he lived in Portobello, Scotland, where he was apprenticed to a bootmaker.

== Marriage and emigration to South Australia ==
In April 1851 Dowie married Jane Cockburn (c. 1831 – 28 October 1910) and they emigrated to South Australia on the Blundell in May that year, partly sponsored by Caroline Chisholm. They arrived at Adelaide in August. He joined the gold rush to Mount Alexander, but soon returned to Adelaide, opening a bootmaker's shop and factory ("South Australian Boot Factory") in Rundle Street. His businesses were located at the far end of the street, then moved closer to the centre, at numbers 69 and then 63. He also opened a tannery in Bowden.

In 1904 Dowie transferred his business to sons Norman Dowie and (Charles) Stuart Dowie; they sold it to A. W. Barlow and Co. in 1908.

Dowie was a friend of John Darling, and influenced him to also emigrate to South Australia. They continued to associate: Darling hired at least one of the Dowie boys; the two families worshipped at the same church, and two daughters of Dowie married Darling boys.

Dowie was appointed President of the Board of Conciliation, serving from 1885 to 1896.

== Religion ==
He joined the Congregational Church before he left Scotland, and was active in the Adelaide church as Sunday-school teacher, lay preacher, and deacon.

== Family ==
Alexander Dowie (4 September 1827 – 18 July 1909) married Jane Cockburn (c. 1831 – 28 October 1910) in April 1851. Their children included:

- John Alexander Dowie (died 9 April 1888) married Jessie Blair Crawford (1862–1921). She was a sister of merchant R. H. Crawford. (Note: Hugh Archibald Crawford (c. 1824 – 6 October 1881), his son Robert Hugh Crawford (c. 1854 – 18 October 1930) and his son Hugh John (c. 1883 – 21 March 1943) owned Adelaide's major grocery, in Hindley Street then King William Street from 1852 to 1933, when they were bought out by S. O. Beilby on 12 April 1883.) Not to be confused with his identically-named cousin, "Elijah Dowie".
- Jessie Dowie (1852 – 23 November 1915) married John Darling, jun. (1852–1914) on 14 October 1875.
- Jane Dowie (9 May 1854 – 11 March 1936 in Zion City, Ill.) married her cousin Rev. John Alexander Dowie ("Elijah" to his followers) on 26 May 1876. As "Overseer Jane Dowie" she held high office in his church.
- Margaret "Maggie" Dowie (1856–1920) married Arthur Faulkner Gardiner (died 20 April 1936) (son of Robert Gardiner) on 28 May 1875.
- Mary Dowie (21 September 1860– ) married S. Stevenson in Chicago, Ill. on 25 July 1900
- Bessie Dowie (24 September 1862–c. 1890) married James Darling on 26 October 1882; moved to "Glenarona", Kilmore, Victoria
- Adelaide Dowie (4 December 1864 – 12 July 1892)
- George Cockburn Dowie (18 October 1867 – 16 November 1886)
- Norman Dowie (27 July 1870 – 14 September 1947) worked in father's business.
- (Charles) Stuart Dowie (10 April 1874 – 17 November 1937) worked in his father's business. He married Gertrude Phillis (Phyllis?) Davey on 21 December 1910.

- John Stuart Dowie (15 January 1915 – 19 March 2008), painter and sculptor

His brother John Murray Dowie (c. 1826 – c. October 1908) emigrated c. 1861 aboard Shah Jehan; active Hindmarsh Square Congregational Church, left for Chicago 1896.

- Andrew Dowie ( – 16 March 1919) educated at Adelaide Educational Institution, married Honor Ann Uren (died 1917) in 1876
- John Alexander Dowie "Elijah Dowie" married his cousin, Jane Dowie (9 May 1854 – 11 March 1936) on 26 May 1876. Not to be confused with his identically named cousin (above).

- Gladstone Dowie (1877–1945)
- Jeanie Dowie (1879–1885)
- Esther Dowie (1881–1902).
