= Elizabeth Darling =

Elizabeth Darling may refer to:

- Elizabeth Darling, author of Britain Can Make It
- Bessie Darling, American socialite and murder victim
- Elizabeth Darling, Author of AA Women in Architecture
- Eliza, Lady Darling (1798–1898), British philanthropist and artist, wife of Sir Ralph Darling
