= Marilyn Darling =

Australian philanthropist and patron of the arts

Dr Marilyn Darling AC
- Born: Marilyn Ann Skinner; 7 November 1943 (age 82); Brisbane, Queensland
- Education: University of Queensland; Monash University
- Occupations: Microbiologist; philanthropist; arts patron
- Known for: Founding patron of the National Portrait Gallery
- Board member of: Victorian Children's Aid Society; Victorian State Opera Foundation; Melbourne Lost Dogs Home; National Portrait Gallery (chair, 2000–2008)
- Spouse: (Leonard) Gordon Darling (m. 1989; died 2015)

Dr Marilyn Ann Darling AC (born Marilyn Ann Skinner, 7 November 1943) is an Australian philanthropist and patron of the arts who trained as a microbiologist. With her late husband, Leonard Gordon Darling AC CMG (known as Gordon Darling; 1921—2015), she instigated and has provided ongoing funding to the National Portrait Gallery in Canberra, and serves as the gallery's founding patron, and on a range of other not-for-profit and charitable organisations.

== Early life and education ==
Darling was born Marilyn Skinner in Brisbane, Queensland on 7 November 1943. She graduated from the University of Queensland in 1964 with a bachelor of science, worked as a microbiologist at The University of Melbourne from 1965 to 1968, and undertook postgraduate study in the Medical School of Monash University from 1973 to 1978, and obtained her doctorate.

== Philanthropic career ==
In 1979 Darling became president of the Victorian Children's Aid Society (VCAS) Auxiliary, then board member from 1984–1987. From 1984 to 1989 Darling was a trustee of the Victorian State Opera Foundation and from 1986–1891 a member of the executive committee of the Dame Joan Hammond Award. She also spent three years on the organising committee for the Spoleto Festival in 1988–1991. From 1985 to 1987 she was a member of the board of management of the Melbourne Lost Dogs Home. From 1987 to 1991 she was a member of the Music Foundation Appeal committee at the University of Melbourne's Trinity College. In 1989 Darling became a member of the board of the Gordon Darling Australasian Print Fund at the National Gallery of Australia. Darling was convenor patron of an exhibition, "Uncommon Australians: Towards an Australian Portrait Gallery", which travelled Australia from 1992 to 1993.

== Personal life ==
In October 1989, aged 46 years, Skinner married (Leonard) Gordon Darling (4 March 1921 — 31 August 2015), aged 68 years, a long-term director of BHP, and director of John Darling and Son, grain merchants, from the 1950s until its trade sale in 1962. They had two sons and two daughters; and live in Melbourne.

Harold Gordon Darling was one of Gordon's uncles, and other relatives included test cricketer Joe Darling, Joe's brother, John Darling Jr., and their father, John Darling Sr., of the eponymous John Darling and Son.

=== Honours and recognition ===
In 1980, Gordon Darling was appointed as a Companion of the Order of St Michael and St George, in recognition of his service to industry and commerce.

Both Marilyn and Gordon Darling were awarded the Centenary Medal on 1 January 2001, for their respective service to the arts and business communities.

In 1989, Gordon Darling was appointed as an Officer of the Order of Australia; and, in 2004, was elevated as a Companion of the Order, in recognition of his philanthropic contributions to the arts. Marilyn Darling was also appointed as a Companion of the Order, in 2009, in recognition of her service to the development, advancement and growth of visual arts in Australia and internationally, particularly through the National Portrait Gallery, and to the community through a range of philanthropic endeavours.

In 2023, Marilyn Darling was awarded a Doctor of Laws (honoris causa) by Monash University.
