= Crawford, Tiruchirappalli =

Coordinates: 10.783143°N 78.676025°E

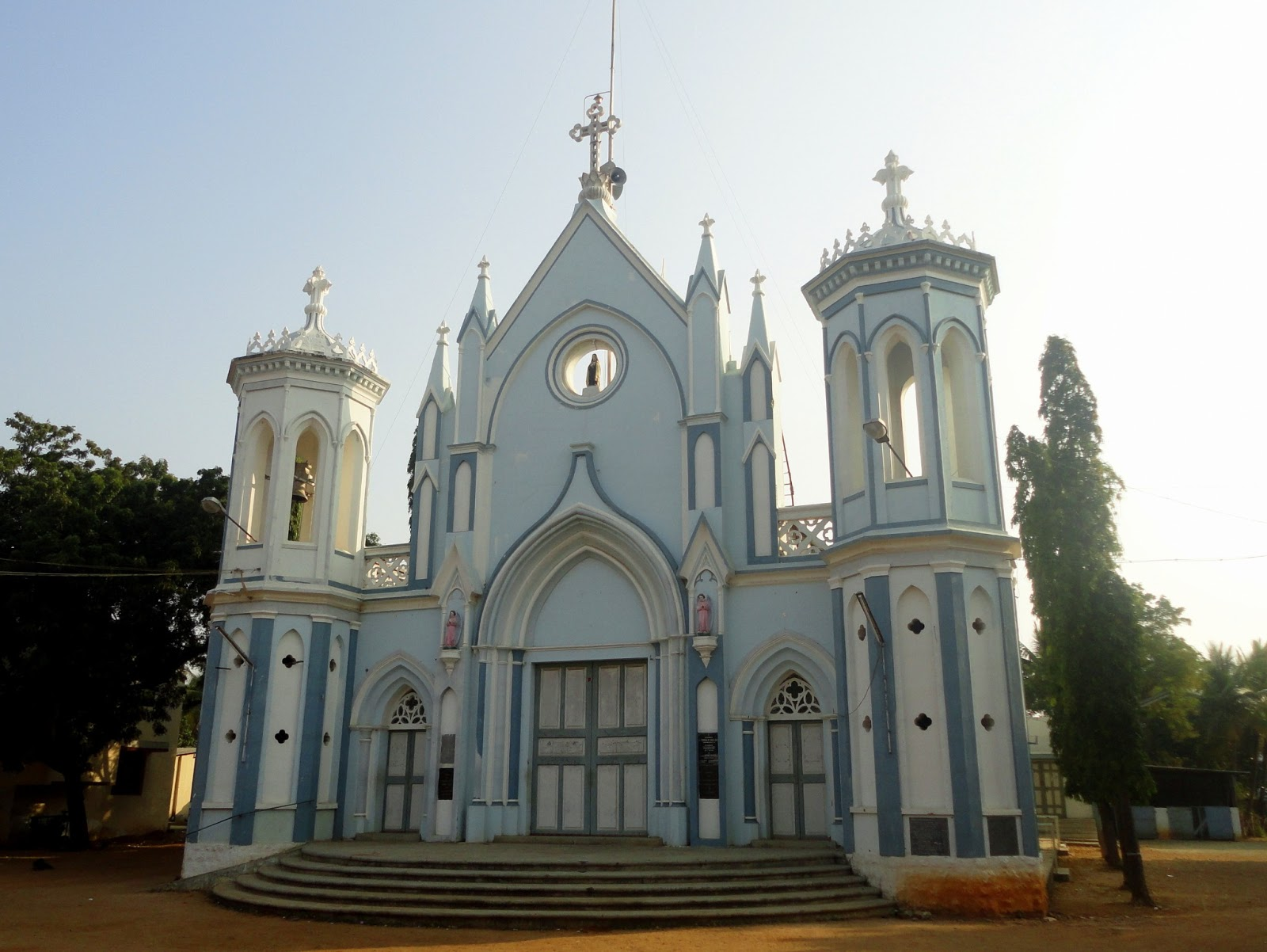
St Theresa church, Crawford Trichy.

Crawford is a part of the city of Trichy in the state of Tamil Nadu in India. This area is adjoining Edamalaipatti Pudur and located on Madurai Road (NH45B) 2.5 km from Trichy Central Bus Stand & 2 km from Trichy Railway Station. Crawford is surrounded by Tamil Nadu Special Police Quarters to the north, Military Camp to the east and Railway Quarters to the west.

== Demographics ==
Residents are usually bankers, business people, teachers and clerical workers. The locality has an equal combination of middle-class and upper-middle-class people.

== History ==
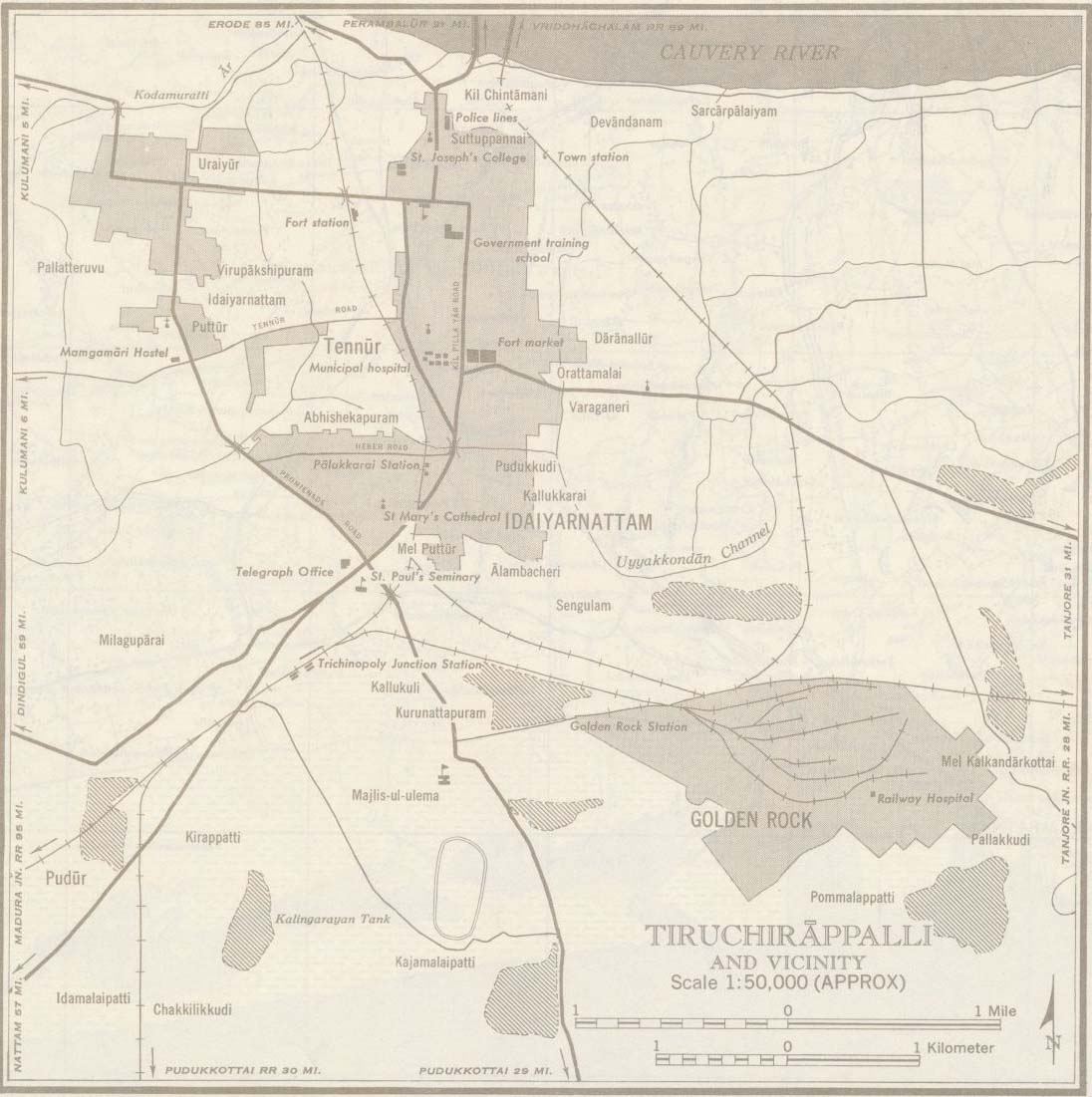
Tiruchirappalli Map in 1955; Source: http://www.lib.utexas.edu/maps/ams/india/

In the early 1920s Thiru. T.S.Arokiyasamy Pillai arranged to buy acres of land from the Kirappatti village community and established a colony for Roman Catholics. He and his friends, all the pioneers down from clustered Trichy town chose this thorn infested barren vacant area for their future residences and christened this as "Crawford Colony" on 28.05.1927. Early in those days this area was not developed. The pioneers formed a cooperative society under No:R 305 on 28.08.1927 naming it as 'Crawford Catholic Cooperative Building Society.'Very large plots of size 150 by 90 feet, with wide roads were formed.

Electricity was unknown then. Mr. T.S. Arokiasamy Pillai started a rice mill as suggested by the then electric supply company - S.M.E.S.Company and brought electricity to this area. The pioneers built a Catholic church and named it St. Therasa's church. The church was completed and consecrated in 1934. To honor the initiative and contribution of Mr. T.S.Arokiasamy Pillai a stone inscription has been erected on the church front wall. The pioneers felt the need for a school and apportioned a space for it and The Little Flower Elementary School came up there. It is managed by the sisters of St. Anne, Trichy. A machine shop cum fabrication industry was started on the west side of the colony across the Madurai road which provided employment for local people. The land to the south of Colony Main Road was farmland and the present-day TSA Nagar, Anbu Nagar, State Bank Officers' Colony, were the offshoots of the well laid out Crawford Colony and became part and parcel of it.

== Neighbourhood ==
1. Crawford colony
2. Cauvery nagar
3. Muslim street
4. Railway colony
5. TSP camp
6. T.S.A Nagar
7. Convent Street
8. Mission Kovil Street
9. Pillaiyar Kovil Street
10. Kaveri Nagar
11. Gandhi Nagar
12. Anbu Nagar
13. Arunachalam Nagar
14. Bharathi min Nagar
15. Joseph Colony
16. Pushpam Colony
17. SBI Officers Colony
18. Arockiya Nagar
