= Crawford College, Durban =

Coordinates: 29°52′23″S 30°58′43″E

- Glenmore in Durban, KwaZulu-Natal; South Africa

Information
- Type: Alternative independent school
- Established: 1997
- Founder: Graeme Crawford
- Closed: 1 December 2006
- Affiliation: ADvTECH Group

Crawford College, Durban was an alternative, independent school in Glenmore in Durban, KwaZulu-Natal, South Africa. The school was established by Graeme Crawford in 1997 on the campus of Carmel College, a Jewish high school. Sometime after 1997 the school was bought by the ADvTECH Group which closed the school down on 1 December 2006. Eden College Durban opened on the same campus in 2007. Its principal when it closed was Ms. Louise Underhill, and the Deputies were Terry Barnes and Mr. Chris Marcellin.

There are two other Crawford Schools in KwaZulu-Natal: Crawford College, La Lucia and Crawford College, North Coast.
