= Karumandapam =

Town in Tiruchirappalli district, Tamil Nadu, India

Karumandapam கருமண்டபம்
- Trichy City
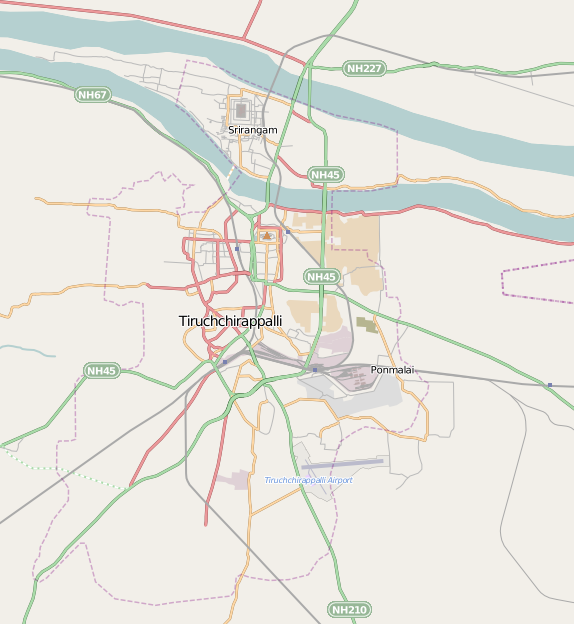
- Location within Tiruchirapalli
- Coordinates: 10°47′12″N 78°40′15″E
- Country: India
- State: Tamil Nadu

Government
  - Type: K abhisekapuram
- Time zone: UTC+5.30 (IST)

Karumandapam is a part of the city of Tiruchirappalli in Tamil Nadu, India, adjoining the Tiruchirappalli Junction. Situated on the Tiruchi-Dindigul road, Just 3 Km from Trichy Central Bus Stand. Karumandapam has been affected by traffic congestion over the past few years. Karumandapam has its unique Temple Named "Ilangattu mariamman Kovil"(இளங்காட்டு மாரியம்மன் கோவில்). This temple is very old and powerful for the Peoples who lives in and around Karumandapam. Its car festival falls on the Tamil month of "Vaigasi"(வைகாசி) every year. This is Seven days festival Through Sunday to next Monday.

Karumandapam is a self-sufficient neighbourhood which has all amenities like schools and hospitals.

Medicals Availability: Aravind Medicals, Med Plus, Appolo

Nearby Schools and Colleges: National College, Cheddinadu arts and Science College, Oxford Engineering College, CARE Engineering College, Arockiamatha Matriculation Higher Secondary school, Om Maruthi Matriculation School, Ponnagan English Medium School, Govt middle School
