= Charles Darling =

Charles Darling may refer to:

- Charles Hial Darling (1859–1944), United States assistant secretary of the Navy
- Charles Henry Darling (1809–1870), British colonial governor
- Charles Darling, 1st Baron Darling (1849–1936), English lawyer, politician and judge
- Chuck Darling (Charles Frick Darling, born 1930), American basketball player
- Charles Darling (pool player), American artistic pool and trick shot world champion
- Charles Darling (American football), college football and baseball player
