= Sam Darling =

Sam Darling or Samuel Darling may refer to:

- Samuel Taylor Darling, American pathologist and bacteriologist
- Sam Darling (jockey, born 1826), rode in 1850 Grand National
- Sam Darling (jockey, born 1852), jockey and trainer at Beckhampton
