= Crawford's =

Bakery

The original bakery on The Shore is the third building from the left in this print, showing a visit by King George IV in 1822.

Crawford's is a British brand of biscuits. It started as a Scottish baker of ship's biscuits in a public house on The Shore, Leith in 1813. The bakery was acquired by Robert Mathie in 1817 and then William Crawford in 1856, when Mathie retired. William Crawford & Sons established large factories in Leith and Liverpool so that, at its peak, it was one of Britain's largest biscuit manufacturers and claimed to be its oldest. The company was acquired by United Biscuits in 1960 and is now a brand within their portfolio.

== History ==
In 1856, William Crawford (1818–1889) bought an established bakery at 31 The Shore, Leith from Robert Mathie (1789–1863). The bakery specialised in ships' biscuits and had been established in 1813, with Mathie taking it over in 1817.

Crawford wished to expand the business and set up a retail outlet at 14 Leith Street (which links Leith Walk to Princes Street) in 1861, relocating to the exclusive address of 2 Princes Street in 1866. In 1879 they built a large purpose built factory on Elbe Street in Leith. The Elbe Street factory was served by its own railway siding. A second factory premises was built in Leith on Anderson Place in 1947 (it is now in use as a creative hub).

William's eldest son, William Crawford (1858–1926), became a partner of the business in 1880 and expanded it further. It was then known as Crawford and Sons.

In 1897, two younger brothers, Archibald Inglis Crawford and James Shields Russel Crawford, were sent to establish a subsidiary in Australia. They got as far as the major English port of Liverpool in England where they established a major new factory. This huge factory, the Fairfield Works, stands on Binns Road and was designed by their brother, the architect Alexander Hunter Crawford in 1895, taking two years to build. The Liverpool factory was highly mechanised, allowing creation of more elaborate biscuit designs, in particular the Custard cream which promptly became one of Britain's most popular biscuits. The Fairfield factory made snack bars including Bandits, Penguin, and 54321 chocolate.

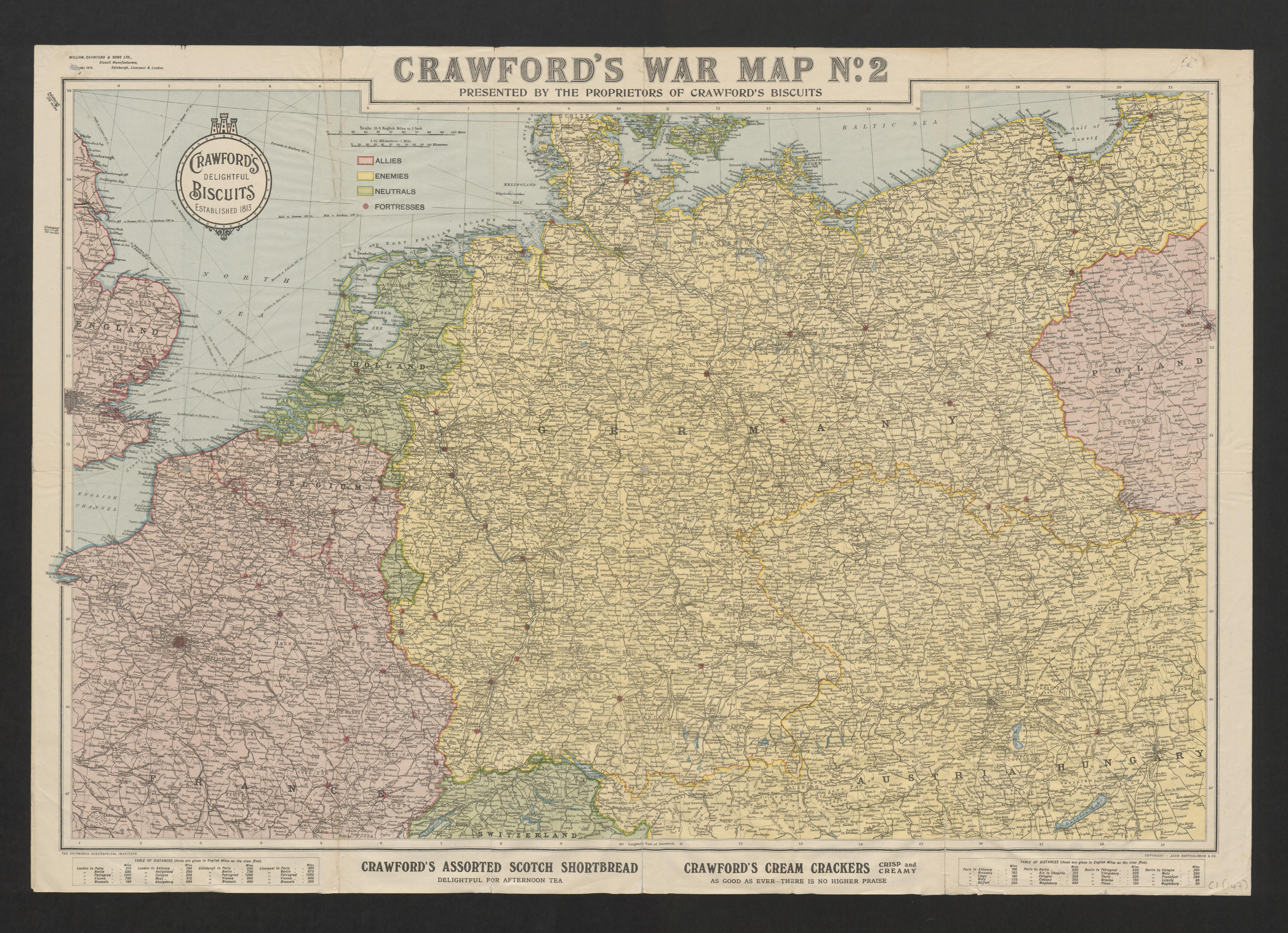
In the First World War Crawford's produced presentation maps for consumers of their biscuits. This map is from the National Library of Wales.

In 1927 Crawfords were one of the first factories to provide employees with their own social club and sports facilities: at Sandown Hall in nearby Wavertree.

In 1938, Crawford's carried out the first ever British national biscuit survey, interviewing approximately 5,000 households.

United Biscuits, formed in 1948 from two Scottish companies, MacFarlane Lang and McVitie & Price, acquired William Crawford & Sons in 1960 for £6 million.

Production processes were automated in the 1960s.

The Elbe Street factory was expanded and modernised in the 1950s but demolished in the 1990s when housing in Leith's former industrial areas started to change the area. Around 200 people lost their jobs. The closure in 1996 was cited as a casualty in the Scottish "bread wars".

McVities have struggled to maintain the Scottish factories for their iconic Scottish brands.

== Products ==
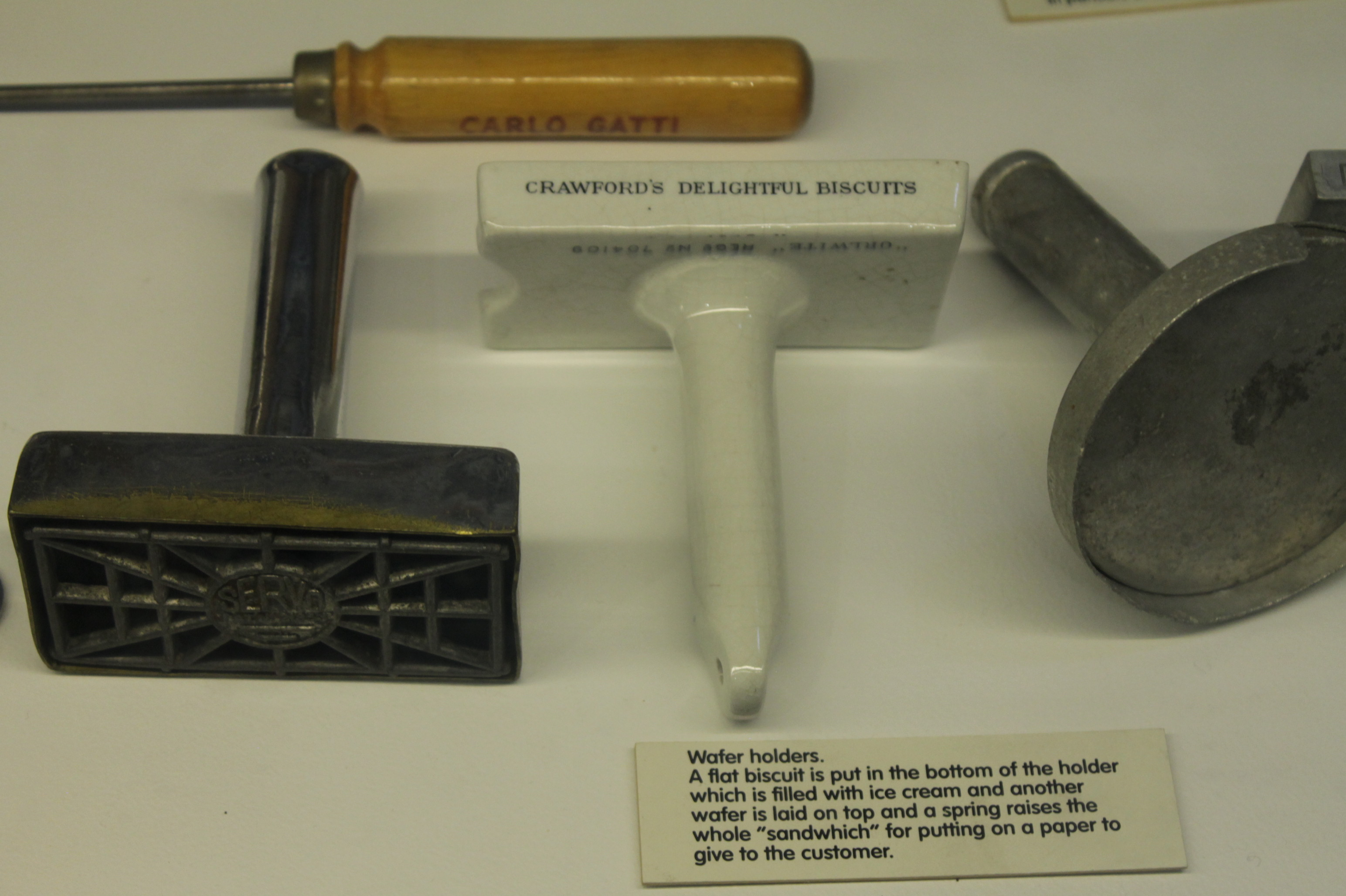
Crawford's Biscuits - Press for Ice Cream Wafers

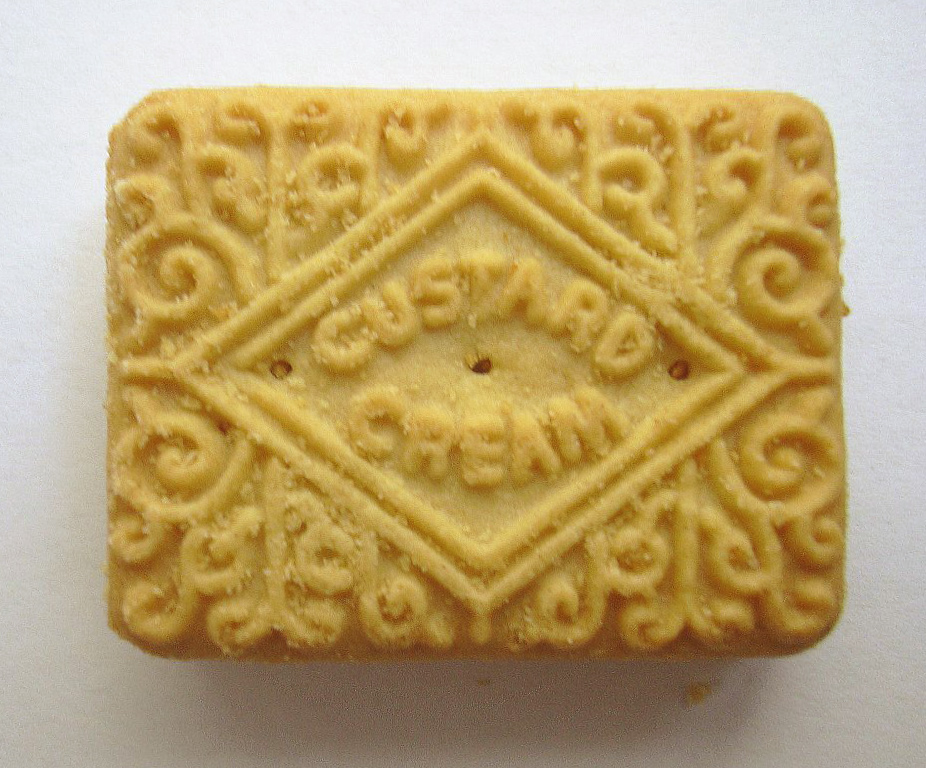
A Crawford's custard cream biscuit

In 1923, the company advertised several biscuit varieties which commemorated royalty and its marriages:

- York – the marriage of the Duke of York to Elizabeth Bowes-Lyon
- Wedding Bells – the marriage of Princess Mary to Viscount Lascelles
- Marie – the marriage of Grand Duchess Maria Alexandrovna of Russia to the Duke of Edinburgh
- Royal George

Their range then included a variety of popular biscuits including shortbread, cream crackers, digestives and ginger nuts.

The brand now includes:

- Bourbon creams
- Cream crackers
- Custard creams
- Digestives
- Garibaldi biscuits
- Marie biscuits
- "Nice" biscuits

== Packaging ==
Historically, some of Crawford's biscuits were sold in decorative biscuit tins. In 2007, a Crawford biscuit tin was sold for £15,600 at Bonhams in the form of a sports car and was reported to be the most expensive tin sold until that date.
