= Crawford and Son =

Crawford and Company was a major grocery store in the early days of Adelaide; for many years the largest family owned concern in the colony.

== History ==
The founder, H. A. Crawford (c. 1824–1881), who had previously run a grocer's shop in Rundle Street, Adelaide and a tea and coffee shop in Hindley Street, Adelaide, before running a pastoral business (see below). In 1868 he returned to the city to work for the grocery business of Flett and Linklater at No.4 Hindley Street, Adelaide (then the premier retail street). In November 1869 he purchased the business from James Munro Linklater (c. 1809 – 17 December 1882) the sole owner, his business partner and brother-in-law William Flett (c. 1806 – 11 January 1855) having died some fifteen years previously.

Businessman Ellis Edwards had purchased the grocery business of W. Morgan at No.24 Hindley Street in July 1869. In April 1875 Crawford purchased the stock and goodwill of Edwards's business and traded as Crawford, Edwards & Co. at No.4 Hindley Street, retaining Edwards as a partner.

This partnership was dissolved in January 1878, and the store continued under the same name, but run by H. A. Crawford and his son Robert Hugh Crawford. Edwards opened another store in competition to Crawford, and Crawford rebranded his shop as Crawford & Co. among mutual accusations of bad faith.

In September 1881 Hugh Crawford and his son Robert were granted Storekeepers' Colonial Wine Licences. (the firm still held that licence in 1925). Hugh Crawford died the following month, and his son took over the business.

G. Wood, Son & Co. Ltd, ("Woodsons") who were wholesale and retail grocers, sold their retail business to Crawford & Son around 1895. In 1896 Crawfords purchased Finlayson & Co.'s stores at Avenue Road, Mount Lofty. and 70 King William Street, which later premises was re-opened as "R. Crawford & Co." on 3 October 1896 and the Hindley Street shop closed.

The premises, attracting an annual rent of £240, amongst many others owned by Jacob Barrow Montefiore, was auctioned after his death, and was knocked down to W. Kuhnel for £5,250.

In 1933 Crawford & Co was purchased by Sydney Oscar Beilby (c. 1880 – 3 February 1944), who sold up his businesses in 1938, and was in turn taken over by Wilkinson and Co. in 1949, but continued to trade as a subsidiary, S. O. Beilby Ltd.

== H. A. Crawford ==
Hugh Archibald Crawford (c. 1824 – 6 October 1881) ran a "Family Grocer and Corn Dealer", in Rundle Street, Adelaide, then in 1852 took over S. F. Mann's "City Grocery Mart" in Hindley Street, Adelaide, as "H. A. Crawford, Family Grocer", specialising in tea and coffee. He quit the grocery business in 1858 for Kirkala sheep station, near Streaky Bay which he took up with his brother-in-law James Munro Linklater (c. 1810 – 17 December 1882). He was appointed Justice of the Peace for Streaky Bay?

He left for Adelaide in 1868, and in 1869 took over management of Linklater's grocery business "Flett and Linklater" at 4 Hindley Street. He later brought in as partner an erstwhile competitor Ellis Edwards, whom he bought out in 1878 and restyled the business as Crawford & Son.

H. A. Crawford married Mary Linklater (c. 1817 – 23 June 1900) in 1851. Their children included:

- Mary Jane (c. 1853 – 19 January 1870)
- Robert Hugh (c. 1854 – 18 October 1930) see below
- Agnes (29 May 1857 – 29 May 1889) married Walter Edwin Dalton on 17 January 1882
- Jessie Blair (3 June 1862 – 30 November 1921) married John Alexander Dowie ( – 9 April 1888), eldest son of Alexander Dowie on 12 April 1883.

== R. H. Crawford ==
Robert Hugh Crawford (c. 1854 – 18 October 1930) was a noted horse judge and proprietor of the largest family-owned grocery store in the early days of South Australia, founded by his father H. A. Crawford. Robert Hugh succeeded to the business on his father's death in 1900. He purchased the retail side of G. Wood, Son & Co. ("Woodson's") around 1880 and purchased Finlayson and Co. and City Cash Stores.

He was a longtime member of the Horse committee of the Royal Agricultural and Horticultural Society and the Society's president from 1913 to 1918. He was on the committee of the Adelaide Hunt Club for 30 years (Master of the club from 1898 to 1901) and "rode to hounds" for many years. He was elected to the Adelaide City Council in 1908 and reelected 1910.

He married Alice Fitch (31 October 1855 – 23 April 1946) on 23? 28? July 1880. Their children included:

- Hugh John Crawford (2 May 1881 – 21 March 1943) married Alexandrina Budge Cudmore (15 June 1882 – 27 November 1942) daughter of J. F. Cudmore, on 26 June 1907. He was a prominent businessman, Shakespeare scholar and member of the Adelaide Hunt Club. (see further biographical notes below)
- Mary () married Reginald F. Richardson () of Port Lincoln on 17 July 1915
- second daughter Florence Isobel () married Horace Gilbert Willcox, son of Charles Willcox, a mayor of Adelaide, on 11 December 1909. Willcox was chairman of Mathias & Co., prominent member of R.A.H.S., a longtime City of Adelaide councilor and its representative on the MTT.
- third daughter Jean () married Hollis Clifton Biddle (c. 1895 – 21 December 1951) on 27 March 1918 on 11 December 1908. Lived in Caulfield, Victoria then Burnside Road, Kensington Gardens.
- Agnes Crawford of Toorak
- Kathleen Crawford, of Toorak

== H. J. Crawford ==
Hugh John Crawford (2 May 1881 – 21 March 1943) was born in Adelaide and in 1930 inherited the business, which in 1933 he sold to Sydney Oscar Beilby (c. 1880 – 2 February 1944), who disposed of it in 1938 to S. O. Beilby Pty. Ltd. grocery chain, which in 1949 was taken over by Wilkinson and Co. He went on to become a director of Walter Reynell & Sons Ltd. He was one of the best known members of the Adelaide Hunt Club and the Adelaide Polo Club, and was in his youth one of the outstanding amateur boxers in the State. He was deputy chairman of the SA Dried Fruits Board from 1928, and promoted its system of sending Christmas parcels of South Australian produce to England. He had wide literary tastes, and was a keen Shakespearian scholar. He contributed to "The Advertiser" on hunting activities under the nom-de-plume of Roundabout, and was also a prominent rower.

He married Alexandrina Budge Cudmore (15 June 1882 – 27 November 1942), a member of the influential Cudmore family on 26 June 1907. Their children included:

- Basil Hugh Cudmore Crawford,(1908–1960) grazier, of Naracoorte SA married Margaret Jean Campbell Phillips (1913 -1993) on 20 April 1938 and had 3 children Heather (1941-) of UK, R.Hugh (1943-) of Naracoorte SA, Graham J (1945-) of Sydney NSW
- Betty Crawford of Somerton married Dr Ronald Knight and lived in Yarloop, Western Australia and had 3 children
- Barbara Crawford, of Somerton then Blackwood. She never married.

== J. C. Crawford ==
John Caldwell Crawford (1862 – December 1922), a nephew of H. A. Crawford, migrated to South Australia around 1876 and worked for Crawford & Co for a time, was drowned in tragic circumstances.

- Agnes Crawford (c. 1858 – 29 May 1889) married Walter Edwin Dalton ( – ) on 17 January 1882.
