= Crawford, Mobile County, Alabama =

Unincorporated community in Alabama, United States

Crawford, Alabama
- Unincorporated community
- Location within Alabama Location within the United States
- Coordinates: 30°45′51″N 88°13′40″W
- Country: United States
- State: Alabama
- County: Mobile
- Elevation: 213 ft (65 m)
- Time zone: UTC-6 (Central (CST))
  - Summer (DST): UTC-5 (CDT)
- Area code: 251
- GNIS feature ID: 143273

Crawford is an unincorporated community in Mobile County, Alabama, United States. Crawford is located along U.S. Route 98, 12 miles (19 km) west-northwest of downtown Mobile.
