= Crawfordsville, Ohio =

Coordinates: 39.787607°N 84.706515°W

Crawfordsville is an extinct town in Preble County, in the U.S. state of Ohio.

== History ==
Crawfordsville was laid out in 1842. It could not compete with nearby New Hope.
