= John Darling Sr. =

Australian politician

John Darling, Snr.
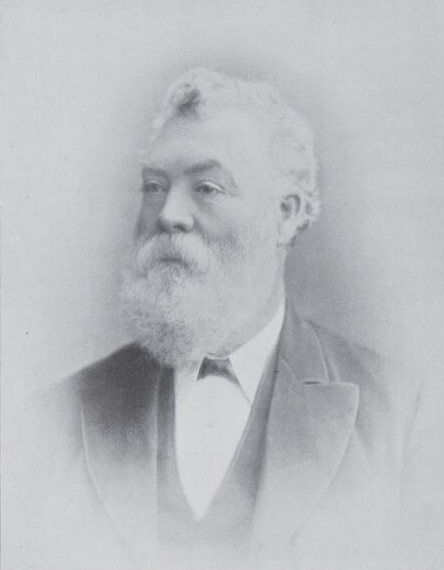
- Darling, in 1901

South Australian House of Assembly
- In office 28 March 1870 – 13 December 1871
- Constituency: West Adelaide
- In office 21 June 1876 – 15 April 1878
- Constituency: West Adelaide
- In office 16 April 1878 – 24 April 1881
- Constituency: Yatala
- In office 15 May 1885 – 5 April 1887
- Constituency: Stanley

South Australian Legislative Council
- In office 19 May 1888 – 21 May 1897
- Constituency: Northern District

Commissioner of Public Works
- In office 16 June 1885 – 14 October 1885
- Premier: Sir John Downer
- Preceded by: Jenkin Coles
- Succeeded by: John Spence

Personal details
- Born: John Patrick Darling; 23 February 1831 Edinburgh, Midlothian, Scotland
- Died: 10 April 1905 (aged 74) Kensington Road, Norwood, South Australia
- Spouse(s): Isabella, née Ferguson (m. 1850)
- Children: John Darling Jr., Robert Darling, Charles Alfred Darling, George Darling, James Darling, Frank Darling, Joseph Darling, Isabella Hall
- Parent: John Darling ( –1841) (father)
- Education: George Heriot's School
- Occupation: Grain merchant; flour miller; business proprietor; politician
- Known for: John Darling and Son
- Nickname: The Grain King

John Patrick Darling Sr. (23 February 1831 – 10 April 1905) was a Scottish businessman who developed as a merchant and the largest grain exporter in Australia. He also served as a politician in South Australia in both houses of Parliament.

Born in Edinburgh, as a young married man he emigrated with his family to Australia in 1855, following friends who had traveled there some years before because of the colony's opportunities.

== Early years in Scotland ==
John Patrick Darling (23 February 1831 – 10 April 1905) was born in Edinburgh, the second son of John Darling of Duns and his wife, who were a family of modest means. He was educated at George Heriot's School. His father died when he was 10, and the boy was forced to leave school at the age of 11 to help support his family.

His first job was as an office boy at the printing shop of Balfour & Jack, but he lost that job after 6 or 8 weeks. He next worked at Duncan Sinclair and Sons' type foundry, "Whitford House"; then at Alexander Wilson & Son. Lastly he was employed at James Marr, Gallie, & Co., where he worked for about 12 years. He married Isabella Ferguson in 1850, and they had two sons, including John Darling Jr.).

Several of his friends, including Alexander Dowie and Joseph Ferguson, emigrated to South Australia in 1851. Over the years there, Dowie built a bootmaking and tannery business, and Ferguson became an owner of The Register in Adelaide.

Realizing the lack of opportunities for advancement in Edinburgh, Darling decided to follow them. He was not a wealthy man, and did not qualify for assisted passage, so it took some time before he could arrange to emigrate with his family.

== Establishment of flour milling in Adelaide ==
Early in 1855, he and his family sailed from Leith on the Isabella, landing at Semaphore, South Australia. Four days later he was working in the Berry & Gall store in Rundle Street, Adelaide. Although this job did not last long, he soon found work with baker Robert Birrell of Grenfell street. He worked there for two years.

Darling left to work as a carter and, at the same time, helped his wife set up a store adjacent to the Stag Inn on Rundle Street. They tried again with a shop, "Millbrook Store", on Glen Osmond Road, which slowly became profitable.

His life changed after Darling was recruited by James Smith, of Giles & Smith, Waymouth street, who had a flour mill on West Terrace. While working with Giles & Smith for five years, Darling learned the wheat and flour business. He resigned from the firm and by 1865 was trading independently. In 1867 he took over sole management of the grain stores in Waymouth Street, previously owned by R. G. Bowen. John Darling Jr., began to work with him, and in 1872 was made a partner in the business, thereafter known as J. Darling & Son, millers, grain, and general merchants. For 30 years the business grew steadily. Known as the "Grain King," Darling set up branches throughout South Australia's wheat belt. First he bought up flour mills, then established brokerage agencies in Melbourne in 1880 and London. His company grew to handle most of Australia's export grain.

Darling retired from the business in October 1897, leaving John Darling, Jr as sole proprietor.

== Political career ==
Darling became involved in politics by March 1870. With Patrick "Paddy" Coglin, he was elected for the House of Assembly seat of the West Adelaide district. That parliament lasted little more than a year. Darling did not stand for re-election, choosing instead to travel overseas on business.

But he was re-elected from West Adelaide, serving from 21 June 1876 to 15 April 1878. In 1878 he was returned for the Yatala, but retired in 1880. He did not re-enter Parliament till May 1885, after winning the seat of Stanley.

In May 1887 he was elected as a representative of the Northern District in the Legislative Council. For ten years he continued to be elected to the Upper House. In June 1885, he accepted the portfolio of Commissioner of Public Workss in Sir John Downer's ministry, and he retired from government in October of the same year.

"He played a useful and an honorable part in the politics of the State, and he was remembered as a prudent, sagacious legislator. He held his opinions strongly, and was not swayed from his convictions by the desire for applause or popularity. ... He knew his mind, and did not waver, doing solid, conscientious work, supporting in particular the interests of the agriculturists, with whose requirements he made himself thoroughly conversant. His sound judgment and the wide knowledge he had gained of South Australia as a leading man of business, earned him the respect and confidence both of his legislative colleagues and the public. It has well been said that though he was not a frequent speaker in Parliament, his utterances' always carried weight. ... On Select Committees and Royal Commissions he did a great deal of quiet and unostentatious work, which has since benefited the country. The Commission on coal contracts and wharfingering, it may be mentioned, were appointed on his initiative."

== Society and religion ==
Darling was a member of the Adelaide Caledonian Society, and its Chief from 1892 to 1894. He became interested in cricket through his son Joseph (who captained Australia in 21 Test matches), and took a leading part in establishing the Adelaide Oval.

Darling was a deacon of the Hindmarsh Square Congregational Church before joining the Flinders Street Baptist Church in 1865. There he served as Sunday school superintendent, and was an active member, serving as a lay preacher and on committees. He was absent only while living two years in Melbourne, or when overseas on business, as he developed his export business in London. He put £500 into founding the City Mission Hall in Light Square.

== Death and legacy ==
Darling last attended church the day before he died, for the first service of a new pastor, Rev. James Mursell. Darling died of sudden heart failure at the family home "Thurloo" on Kent Terrace, Kent Town. This may have been the residence later known as "Darling House" at 64 Kent Terrace, Kent Town (subsequently 64 Kensington Rd, Norwood). He left an estate worth £67,500.

The two-storey house was acquired by the Salvation Army in 1929; they operated it as the "Kent Town Boys' Home" until 1972. It later was used by the South Australian AIDS Council as its headquarters.

== Family ==
Darling married Isabella Ferguson, daughter of James and his wife, on 31 December 1850. They had seven sons and one daughter:

- John Darling, Jr. (24 January 1852 – 27 March 1914), married Jessie Dowie, eldest daughter of Darling's friend Alexander Dowie, on 14 October 1875. Darling Jr. became a partner with his father and inherited the family business.
- Robert Darling (died c. 1933), an accountant and grain dealer of Geraldton and Fremantle, Western Australia. His company was bought out by Frank Green in 1907. He appeared in court in 1911 accused of uttering a worthless cheque to a bookmaker.
- Charles Alfred Darling, manager of the firm's London house, became manager of the British New Guinea Development Company. He retired to Tumby Bay, South Australia. A son, Fred B. Darling, was awarded the Military Cross in 1916.
- George Darling (c. 1865 – 24 July 1936) of "Thurloo", Middle Brighton, Victoria
- James Darling (2 September 1857 – 19 March 1929), married Bessie, fifth daughter of his father's friend Alexander Dowie, on 26 October 1882; moved to "Glenarona", Kilmore, Victoria
- Frank Darling (died before May 1934), of "Oatlands", Moorooduc, Victoria
- Joseph "Joe" Darling CBE (21 November 1870 – 2 January 1946), a cricket player who captained Australia
- Isabella Darling, married Henry Ernest Hall, of Williamstown, Victoria

=== Other relatives ===
Other relatives of John Darling, Sr. were involved in the business, including:

- James Darling (1854–1932), a nephew, the company's agent in Kadina, South Australia.
- Harold Gordon Darling (1885–1950), a son of John Darling Jr., who succeeded running the company upon the death of his father and best known for his role as chairman of BHP and as a company director
- Norman Darling, Leonard Darling, and Leonard Gordon Darling, directors of the company from the 1950s

Political offices
Preceded by Jenkin Coles	Commissioner of Public Works; 1885	Succeeded by John Spence
