= John Darling Jr. =

Australian politician

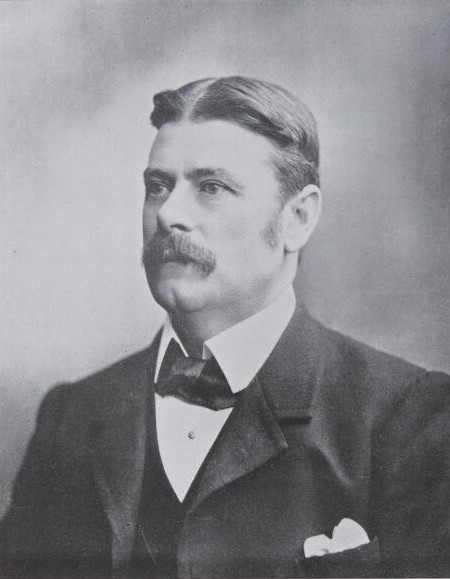

11th Leader of the Opposition (SA)
- In office 1902–1904
- Preceded by: Robert Homburg
- Succeeded by: Thomas Price

South Australian House of Assembly
- In office 25 April 1896 – 2 May 1902 Serving with Frederick Coneybeer
- Preceded by: David Packham
- Succeeded by: electorate abolished
- Constituency: East Torrens
- In office 3 May 1902 – 26 May 1905 Serving with John Jenkins, George Soward, Thomas Price, Frederick Coneybeer
- Preceded by: new electorate
- Succeeded by: Crawford Vaughan, George Dankel, Thomas Hyland Smeaton, Thomas Ryan
- Constituency: Torrens

Personal details
- Party: Australasian National League (1896–05)
- Born: 24 January 1852; Edinburgh, Scotland
- Died: 27 March 1914 (aged 62); Adelaide, South Australia
- Education: Pulteney Street School
- Occupations: Businessman and politician
- Known for: John Darling & Son
- Board member of: The Broken Hill Proprietary Company (BHP) (chair, 1907–1914; dir., 1892–1914); National Mutual Assurance Society; Port Adelaide Dock Company; Caledonian Society of South Australia
- Spouse(s): Jessie, née Dowie (m. 1875)
- Children: 9, including Harold Gordon Darling
- Parents: John Darling Sr. (father); Isabella, née Ferguson (mother)
- Relatives: Joe Darling (brother)

John Darling Jr. (24 January 1852 – 27 March 1914) was a Scottish born South Australian businessman and politician. He was a member of the South Australian House of Assembly from 1896 to 1905, representing the electorates of East Torrens (1896-1902) and Torrens (1902-1905). He was Leader of the Opposition from 1902 to 1904. After leaving politics, he was chairman of the board of directors of The Broken Hill Proprietary Company (BHP) from 1907, until his death in 1914.

== Early life and business ==
Born in Edinburgh, Scotland, the eldest son of John Darling Sr., on 24 January 1852, Darling emigrated to South Australia with his parents and brother, arriving in Adelaide early in 1855. He was educated at the Pulteney Street School (later Pulteney Grammar School) and at the age of 14 started work in his father's business.

In 1872 he was brought into partnership in his father's business, renamed John Darling & Son. His father retired in October 1897, leaving him in sole control. Under his control, the company purchased the Eclipse flour mills, Port Adelaide, and the goodwill of J. Dunn and Co.. He founded a hay-compressing business in Gawler, near the railway station. He became a director of BHP in 1892 and was chairman of directors from 1907 to 1914. He was on the local directorates of several insurance and mining companies with head offices in London, a director of the National Mutual Assurance Society, Victoria and the Port Adelaide Dock Company. He was an active member of the Chamber of Commerce, the Shipowners' Association, and the South Australian Employers' Union.

== Politics and social ==
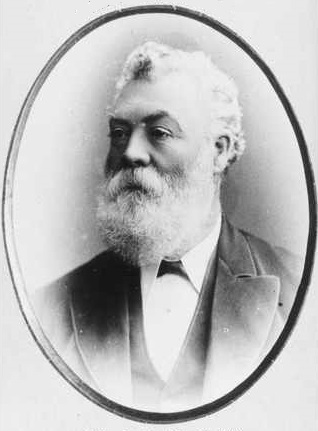
Darling in 1885

Darling was part of the Australasian National League (previously National Defence League) and represented East Torrens in the South Australian House of Assembly the 1896 election to the 1902 election, and after a boundary redistribution, Torrens until the 1905 election. He served as eleventh Leader of the Opposition. He was involved in the reconstruction of the Ministry following the retirement of the Hon. J. G. Jenkins, and when (later Sir) Richard Butler took office in 1905 prior to the election.

He was proud of his Scottish heritage; he was a member of the Caledonian Society of South Australia, and its Chief 1904–1907.

== Death and legacy ==
He died in a Melbourne private hospital on 27 March 1914. He had been in that city a few days to chair a meeting of BHP, when he took ill. His estate was valued at £1,694,500.

== Family ==
Darling married Jessie Dowie (1852 – 23 November 1915), cousin of the evangelist John Alexander Dowie and aunt of the sculptor John Dowie on 14 October 1875 and lived at "Lynton", Kent Terrace, Norwood. Their children included:

- Jessie Isabel Darling (1876–1907)
- Alexander John Darling (1878–1896)
- Elsie Darling (1880–1891)
- Florence Darling (1883– ) married Frederick Young, M.P. for Stanley, later Agent-General for South Australia
- Harold Gordon Darling (1885 – 26 January 1950), succeeded his father as head of John Darling & Son, a director and chairman of BHP
- Gertrude "Gertie" Darling (1887–1968)
- Grace Darling (1889–1964)
- Leonard Darling (1891– ), lived in the United Kingdom from 1911 and served in World War I. His son Leonard Gordon Darling AC CMG (1921 - 31 August 2015, born in London, England) served in World War II, reaching the rank of captain, also became a director of BHP in 1953, chairman of John Darling & Son in 1963, and was a founding patron of the National Portrait Gallery
- Norman Darling (1893–1964) became director of John Darling & Son in 1953

A brother, James Darling (2 September 1857 – 19 March 1929) married Jessie's sister Elizabeth "Bessie" Dowie (24 September 1862 – 12 June 1896) on 26 October 1882; had son Arthur Garfield Darling in 1883, daughter Ruth Darling in 1885. He purchased Glenaroua Station in Victoria from Thomas Singleton in 1901, then moved to Carnamah, Western Australia and became the largest landowner in the region, passed to son Arthur; and later lived at 41 Riversdale Road, Hawthorn, Victoria.

Another brother, Joseph "Joe" Darling CBE (21 November 1870 – 2 January 1946), was a cricket player who captained Australia.

Political offices
Preceded by Robert Homburg	Leader of the Opposition of South Australia; 1902–1904	Succeeded by Thomas Price
South Australian House of Assembly
Preceded by David Packham	Member for East Torrens; 1896–1902; Served alongside: Frederick Coneybeer	Electorate abolished
New district	Member for Torrens; 1902–1905; Served alongside: Jenkins, Soward, Price, Coneybeer	Succeeded by Crawford Vaughan; George Dankel; Thomas Hyland Smeaton; Thomas Ryan
