= Crawford crater =

Impact crater in South Australia

- Location within South Australia
- Location: Adelaide Hills, South Australia, Australia; 34.7175°S 139.0327°E

Impact crater structure
- Confidence: Confirmed
- Diameter: 8.5 km (5.3 mi)
- Age: >35 Ma; Eocene
- Exposed: Yes
- Drilled: No

Crawford is an impact crater near Adelaide in South Australia, Australia.

The Crawford crater is up to 8.5 km long, and is thought to have been formed by oblique (low angle) impact. Its age is estimated to be greater than 35 million years (probably Eocene). Quartz rocks affected by impact-related pressure are present at the site, which is a flat area. The affected rocks are exposed at the surface.
