= Crawford International College, Sandton =

Coordinates: 26.09721°S 28.05080°E

- Sandton, Gauteng; South Africa

Information
- School type: Private school
- Established: 1993; 33 years ago
- Headmistress: Mrs Tracey Purkiss
- Exam board: IEB
- Grades: 000 to 12
- Gender: Boys & Girls
- Age: 2 to 18
- Enrollment: 1,999 pupils
- Language: English
- Schedule: 08:00 - 14:00
- Campus: Urban Campus
- Campus type: Suburban
- Colours: Red; Black; White
- Tuition: R189,570 (2024)
- Website: www.crawfordinternational.co.za/sandton

Crawford International Sandton is a South African alternative, independent school in Benmore, Sandton (north of Johannesburg), Gauteng. It is the Sandton campus of the Crawford Schools. The school was originally a farm.
