= Crawford College, Pretoria =

Coordinates: 25.76633°S 28.21585°E

Crawford International Pretoria

Location
- 555 Sibelius Street, Lukasrand; Pretoria, Gauteng; South Africa

Information
- Type: Private
- Religious affiliation: Non-Denominational
- Established: 1996; 30 years ago
- School district: District 9
- School number: 012 344 1866
- Senior Principal: Mrs Reshma Maharaj
- Exam board: IEB
- Staff: 50 full-time
- Grades: 0000–12
- Gender: Coeducational
- Age: 3 to 18
- Enrollment: >1,000 pupils
- Language: English
- Schedule: 07:45 - 14:30
- Campus: Urban Campus
- Campus type: Suburban
- Houses: Adams; Taylor; Johnson
- Colours: Red; Black; White
- Nickname: Crawford
- School fees: R118,000 (tuition)
- Website: https://www.crawfordinternational.co.za/pretoria

Crawford International Pretoria is a private school in Pretoria, Gauteng, South Africa. It has active sporting and cultural programs.

== History ==
Crawford International Pretoria, the Pretoria campus of the Crawford schools, a network of private schools has its roots in the Carmel school to educate the large local Jewish community. After being acquired by Graeme Crawford, it underwent expansion and transformation. The buildings were extended and renovated. A new media center, art studio, technology and design studio, and drama classrooms were built.

The school has basketball courts, a cricket field, a swimming pool, and the Harlequins Field adjacent to the campus. The school has won the Co-ed Inter-High Gala, a swimming event in 2005, 2006, and 2007. Numerous South African Olympic Team swimmers, including Cameron van der Burgh, Jarred Crous, Michael Meyer, Michelle Weber and Dylan Bosch, were students at Crawford College Pretoria.

== Sports ==
Crawford International Pretoria competes in the following sports:

- Basketball
- Chess
- Cricket
- Football (soccer)
- Swimming
- Softball
