= Crawford International North Coast =

School in South Africa

Coordinates: 29°35′31″S 31°09′18″E

Location
- Ushukela Dr, Westbrook, oThongathi, 4399; Near Ballito and Westbrook, South Africa, Kwazulu-Natal

Information
- Established: 1997

Cra Crawford International North Coast is an alternative, independent school in Westbrook, between oThongathi, Ballito and eMdloti on the North Coast of KwaZulu-Natal, South Africa. The school is owned by the ADvTECH Group and is run as a for-profit business enterprise.

== History ==
wford International North Coast was founded in 1997 on the campus of uThongathi School by Graeme Crawford. The school comprises pre-primary, preparatory and a college.
