= Crawford International La Lucia =

Coordinates: 29.74313°S 31.06481°E

Crawford International La Lucia College
- Umhlanga, KwaZulu-Natal; South Africa

Information
- Type: Private
- Established: 1999
- Locale: Suburban
- Principal: Mrs Warwick
- Grades: Grades 8-12
- Enrollment: 600 approximately
- Colours: Black, White and Red
- School fees: R140000-R170000

Crawford International La Lucia is a school in La Lucia, uMhlanga, KwaZulu-Natal, South Africa. This campus of the Crawford Schools was established in 1999

== History ==
The first Crawford School opened its doors in January 1993 in Killarney, Johannesburg.

In 2017, 109 students took the Independent Examinations Board Matric class; all passed, meeting the required standard to begin a Bachelor's degree. The same year, the school's drumline participate at the Hilton Arts Festival.
