= List of high schools in South Africa =

== Eastern Cape ==
=== Amathole District Municipality ===
- St. Matthew's High School, Keiskammahoek

=== Buffalo City ===
==== East London ====
- Clarendon High School for Girls
- Hudson Park High School
- Port Rex Technical High School
- Selborne College
- Stirling High School
- West Bank High School

==== Mdantsane ====
- Khulani Commercial High School

==== Qonce (King Williams Town) ====
- Dale College

=== Chris Hani District Municipality ===
- Ntsonkotha Senior Secondary School, Lady Frere
- Queen's College, Komani

=== Nelson Mandela Bay ===
==== Gqeberha (Port Elizabeth) ====
- Collegiate Girls High School
- Grey High School
- Lawson Brown High School
- Victoria Park High School
- Westering High School
- Westville Senior Secondary High School

==== Kariega (Uitenhage) ====
- Hoërskool Brandwag
- Muir College
- Molly Blackburn High School, KwaNobuhle

=== OR Tambo District Municipality ===
- Nomaka Mbeki Technical Senior Secondary School Dutywa

=== Sarah Baartman District Municipality ===
- Diocesan School for Girls, Makhanda
- Gill College, Somerset East
- Graeme College, Makhanda
- Kingswood College, Makhanda
- Woodridge College, Thornhill
- Port Alfred High School, Port Alfred
- St. Andrew's College, Makhanda
- Victoria Girls' High School, Makhanda

== Free State ==
- Bethlehem Voortrekker High School, Bethlehem
- Bloemfontein High School, Bloemfontein
- Grey College, Bloemfontein
- Hoërskool Fichardtpark, Bloemfontein
- Hoërskool Jim Fouché, Bloemfontein
- Hoërskool Sentraal, Bloemfontein
- Phehello High School, Kutlwanong
- Sasolburg High School, Sasolburg
- St. Andrew's School, Bloemfontein
- St. Michael's School, Bloemfontein
- Welkom-Gimnasium, Welkom

== Gauteng ==
=== City of Johannesburg ===
- African Leadership Academy, Honeydew
- Allen Glen High School, Allens Nek
- Athlone Boys' High School
- Barnato Park High School
- Bryanston High School, Bryanston
- Crawford College, Lonehill, Lone Hill
- De La Salle Holy Cross College, Victory Park
- Fourways High School, Fourways
- Greenside High School, Greenside
- Helpmekaar Kollege, Braamfontein
- Hoërskool Florida
- Jeppe High School for Boys, Kensington
- Jeppe High School for Girls, Kensington
- King David Schools
- King Edward VII School, Houghton
- Kingsmead College, Rosebank
- Michael Mount Waldorf School, Bryanston
- Parktown Boys' High School, Parktown
- Redhill School
- Roedean School, Houghton
- Sacred Heart College, Observatory
- SAHETI School
- Sandown High School
- Sandringham High School
- Sir John Adamson Secondary School, Robertsham
- St Mary's School, Waverley
- St David's Marist, Inanda
- St. John's College, Houghton Estate
- St. Martin's School, Rosettenville
- St Stithians College
- St Peter's College, Sunninghill
- Torah Academy School, Orchards
- Waverley Girls' High School, Waverley
- Westridge High School
- Yeshiva College of South Africa, Glenhazel

=== City of Ekurhuleni ===
- Alberton High School, Randhart
- Hoërskool Alberton
- Hoërskool Dinamika, Brackenhurst
- Hoërskool Marais Viljoen, Alberante
- St Dunstan's College
- Boksburg High School
- Hoërskool Voortrekker
- St Dominic's Catholic School for Girls
- Germiston High School
- St Benedict's College, Bedfordview
- St Catherine's School

=== City of Tshwane ===
- Cornwall Hill College, Irene
- Hoërskool Eldoraigne, Eldoraigne
- Lyttelton Manor High School, Lyttelton Manor
- Southdowns College, Irene
- Sutherland High School, Eldoraigne
- Tshwane Muslim School
- Mamelodi High School
- Afrikaanse Hoër Meisieskool
- Afrikaanse Hoër Seunskool
- Christian Brothers' College, Mount Edmund
- Clapham High School
- Cornerstone College
- Crawford College, Pretoria
- Hillview High School
- Hoërskool Menlopark
- Hoërskool Oos-Moot
- Hoërskool Overkruin
- Hoërskool Waterkloof
- Hoërskool Wonderboom
- Pretoria Boys High School
- Pretoria High School for Girls
- Pretoria Secondary School
- Pro Arte Alphen Park
- St. Alban's College
- St. Mary's Diocesan School for Girls
- The Glen High School
- TuksSport High School
- Willowridge High School

=== West Rand District Municipality ===
- Hoërskool Monument, Krugersdorp
- Hoërskool Noordheuwel, Krugersdorp

== KwaZulu-Natal ==
=== Amajuba District Municipality ===
==== Newcastle Local Municipality ====
- Ferrum High School, Newcastle

=== eThekwini Metropolitan Municipality ===
==== Botha’s Hill ====
- Kearsney College

==== Durban ====
- Brettonwood High School
- Clifton School
- Durban Girls' College
- Durban Girls' High School
- Durban High School
- Durban North College
- George Campbell School of Technology
- Glenwood High School
- Maris Stella School
- Northlands Girls' High School
- Orient Islamic School
- Port Natal High School
- St. Henry's Marist Brothers' College

==== eNanda (Inanda) ====
- Ohlange High School

==== Folweni ====
- Folweni High School
- Ntwenhle High School
- Siphephele High School

==== Hillcrest ====
- Hillcrest High School

==== Kloof ====
- Kloof High School
- St. Mary's Diocesan School for Girls
- Thomas More College

==== oThongathi (Tongaat) ====
- Crawford International North Coast, Westbrook

==== Pinetown ====
- Pinetown Boys' High School
- Pinetown Girls' High School
- Savannah Park Secondary School
- St Benedict School Pinetown

==== Queensburgh ====
- Queensburgh Girls' High School

==== uMhlanga ====
- Crawford International La Lucia, La Lucia

==== Westville ====
- Westville Boys' High School
- Westville Girls' High School

=== Harry Gwala District Municipality ===
==== Dr Nkosazana Dlamini-Zuma Local Municipality ====
- Pholela High School, Bulwer

==== Greater Kokstad Local Municipality ====
- St. Patrick's College, Kokstad

=== iLembe District Municipality ===
==== KwaDukuza Local Municipality (Dolphin Coast) ====
- Ashton International College, Ballito
- Stanger Manor Secondary School, KwaDukuza
- Stanger Secondary School, KwaDukuza

=== King Cetshwayo District Municipality ===
==== uMlalazi Local Municipality ====
- Eshowe High School, Eshowe

=== Ugu District Municipality (South Coast) ===
==== Ray Nkonyeni Local Municipality (Lower South Coast) ====
- Port Shepstone High School, Port Shepstone

==== uMdoni Local Municipality (Mid South Coast) ====
- Phindavele High School, Dududu

=== Umgungundlovu District Municipality ===
==== Mpofana Local Municipality ====
- Treverton College, Mooi River

==== Msunduzi Local Municipality ====
- Alexandra High School, Pietermaritzburg
- Carter High School, Pietermaritzburg
- Edendale Technical High School
- Epworth High School, Pietermaritzburg
- Heritage Academy (Pietermaritzburg), Pietermaritzburg
- Linpark High School, Pietermaritzburg
- Maritzburg College, Pietermaritzburg
- Pietermaritzburg Girls' High School, Pietermaritzburg
- Russell High School, Pietermaritzburg
- St. Charles College, Pietermaritzburg
- St. John's Diocesan School for Girls, Pietermaritzburg
- St. Nicholas Diocesan School, Pietermaritzburg
- The Wykeham Collegiate, Pietermaritzburg
- Voortrekker High School, Pietermaritzburg

==== uMngeni Local Municipality ====
- Grace College, Hilton
- Hilton College, Hilton
- Howick High School, Howick
- St. Anne's Diocesan College, Hilton
- Michaelhouse, Balgowan

=== uMzinyathi District Municipality ===
==== Umvoti Local Municipality ====
- Deutsche Schule, Hermannsburg

=== uThukela District Municipality ===
==== Inkosi Langalibalele Local Municipality ====
- Estcourt High School, Estcourt

==== Ukhahlamba Local Municipality ====
- Drakensberg Boys' Choir School, Winterton

=== Zululand District Municipality ===
==== Abaqulusi Local Municipality ====
- Inkamana High School, Vryheid
- Mathunjwa High School, Vryheid

== Limpopo ==
- Gojela High School, Mahwelereng
- Harry Oppenheimer Agricultural High School, Limburg
- Kabelo High School, Polokwane
- Lebowakgomo High School, Lebowakgomo
- Leolo High School, Burgersfort
- Phiri Kolobe High, Mankweng
- St Mark's College, Jane Furse
- Stanford Lake College, Haenertsburg
- Vhulaudzi Secondary School, Vhulaudzi
- Segopotje Senior Secondary School, Mashite, Ga Mphalele, Lepelle-Nkumpi Local Municipality
- Mokopane English Combined School

== Mpumalanga ==
=== Barberton ===
- Barberton High School

=== Mbombela ===
- Penryn College

=== White River ===
- Hoërskool Rob Ferreira High School

== Northern Cape ==
=== Kimberley ===
- Diamantveld High School
- Homevale High School
- HTS Kimberley
- Kimberley Boys' High School
- Kimberley Girls' High School
- St. Patrick's CBC
- St. Boniface High School (C.B.C)

== North West ==
- Holy Family Secondary School, Rustenburg
- J M Ntsime High School, Rustenburg
- Ntebogang Secondary School, Dinokana, Zeerust
- Potchefstroom Gimnasium, Potchefstroom
- Potchefstroom High School for Boys, Potchefstroom
- Tsogo High School, Mmakau
- Vryburg High School, Vryburg

== Western Cape ==
=== Cape Metropole ===
==== Bellville ====
- DF Akademie, Boston
- Stellenberg High School, Stellenberg
- The Settlers High School

==== Brackenfell ====
- Brackenfell High School

==== Cape Town ====
- Rhodes High School, Mowbray
- Rondebosch Boys' High School, Rondebosch
- Rustenburg Girls' High School, Rosebank
- Wynberg Boys' High School, Wynberg
- Wynberg Girls' High School, Wynberg
- Westerford High School, Rondebosch/Newlands

==== Durbanville ====
- Fairmont High School
- Hoërskool Durbanville

==== Somerset West ====
- Parel Vallei High School, Parel Vallei
- Somerset College

==== Strand ====
- False Bay High School

=== Cape Winelands ===
==== Stellenbosch ====
- Makupula Secondary School, Stellenbosch
- Paul Roos Gimnasuim,Secondary Boys' School, Stellenbosch, 57 Springboks

== See also ==
- List of primary schools in South Africa
- Matriculation in South Africa
- National Senior Certificate
- Education in South Africa
