= List of primary schools in South Africa =

This is a list of notable primary schools in South Africa, by province.

== Eastern Cape ==
- Good Shepherd School, Makhanda
- St. Andrew's Preparatory School, Grahamstown

== Gauteng ==
=== City of Johannesburg ===
- Boipakitso Primary School
- Dumezweni Primary School
- Finetown Primary School
- Nandi Primary School
- Parkview Senior Primary School
- The Ridge School
- Thuthukani-Tswelopele Primary School
- Vulamazibuko Primary School

=== City of Tshwane ===
==== Centurion ====
- Laerskool en Hoërskool Raslouw
- Regio Centurion Private School

==== Pretoria ====
- Abotts College Pretoria East
- Arcadia Primary School
- Glenstantia Primary School
- La Montagne Primary School
- Lynnwood Ridge Primary School
- Robert Hicks Primary School
- Sunnyside Primary School
- Waterkloof House Preparatory School

=== East Rand ===
- St Catherine's School, Germiston, offers both primary and high school

== KwaZulu-Natal ==
- Acacia Primary School
- Beacon Ridge Primary School
- Bhovungwane Senior Primary School
- Cavendish Primary School
- Clifton Preparatory School, Nottingham Road,
- Cordwalles Preparatory School, Pietermaritzburg
- Cottonlands Primary School
- Danganya Junior Primary School
- Dawncrest Primary School
- Depot Road Memorial Primary School
- Dumezweni Junior Primary School
- Ikhohlwa Primary School
- Ekukhanyeni Lower Primary School
- Emakhuluseni Senior Primary School
- Emangadini Primary School
- Emanyonini Senior Primary School
- Esihonqeni Junior Primary School
- Everest Primary School
- Ezindlovini Primary School
- Gasela Primary School
- Gem Primary School
- Highbury Preparatory School
- Hubhushe Senior Primary School
- Igugulamanyoni Junior Primary School
- Imbaliyamazulu Primary School
- Inhlanganiso Junior Primary School
- Intaphuka Primary School
- Isigudu Junior Primary School
- Isinkotshe Primary School
- Jhugroo Primary School
- Kenville Primary School
- Kwaginga Primary School
- Kwajessop Primary School
- Kwanomphanda Primary School
- Kwashangase Junior Primary School
- Makhawula Primary School
- Mantingwane Primary School
- Maris Stella School, Berea
- Mathabatha Primary School
- Merchiston Preparatory School, Pietermaritzburg
- Mjoli Primary School
- Mthombeni Primary School
- Mtshingwane Primary School
- Primrose Primary School
- Sukuma Primary School
- Summit Primary School
- Treverton Preparatory School and College, Mooi River
- Zandile Junior Primary School

== Limpopo ==
- Greenside Primary School, Polokwane

== Western Cape ==
=== Cape Metropole ===
==== Blouberg ====
- Table View Primary School, Table View

==== Cape Town ====
- Bergvliet Primary School, Bergvliet
- Michael Oak Waldorf School, Kenilworth
- Oakhurst Primary School, Rondebosch
- Rustenburg School for Girls, Rondebosch
- South African College Schools (SACS), Newlands
- The Grove Primary School, Claremont
- Walter Teka Primary School (South Africa), Nyanga

== See also ==
- List of high schools in South Africa
