= Association of Muslim Schools =

The Association of Muslim Schools (AMS) is a global network of Muslim faith-based educational institutes.

The Association supports and develops full-time Muslim Schools. The Association facilitates:

- Educator development workshops
- Inter-school events
- Olympiads
- Conferences

among its member schools.

AMS is a nationally recognized organization within the independent schooling structure in the countries in which it exists. The organizations also serves on the regional and national educational structures as well as a voice within the media.

== AMS (South Africa) ==
Association of Muslim Schools (SA)
- Established: 1989
- Location: South Africa
- Website: www.ams-sa.org.za

AMS-SA was formed in March 1989, at Al Falaah College, known as Lockhat Islamia College at the time. The primary members of the association were: Habibiya Islamic College, Lockhat Islamia College, Roshnee Muslim School, As-Salaam, Lenasia Muslim School and Nur-ul-Islam School. The association was formally launched on 13 May 1989 during the first AMS conference at Lenasia Muslim School. AMS was mandated to facilitate the following:

- Administrative collaboration
- Educator development workshops
- Evaluation/moderation of final examination papers
- Inter-school sports
- Subject-based workshops
- A community outreach programme

AMS-SA has grown steadily over the years. The Annual General Meeting and Teachers' Conference has attracted many prominent personalities from the educational field over the years. The Association further has a Managers' Conference and a Principals' Forum that engage at a regular basis. Currently, the Association consists of 68 schools nationally. It is further recognized by and regularly engages with the national and provincial educational departments, South African Council for Teachers (SACE), Umalusi (National accreditation body for independent schools), Sector Education and Training Authority (SETA).

== AMS (United Kingdom) ==
Association of Muslim Schools (UK)
- Established: 1992
- Location: United Kingdom

AMS-UK was established in 1992 to support and develop excellence in full-time Muslim schools in the UK. There are now over 130 full-time Muslim schools in the UK covering nursery, primary, secondary and further education.

== Other Chapters ==
- Association of Muslim Schools (Canada)
- Association of Muslim Schools (South Africa)
