= Mandisa (given name) =

Mandisa is a feminine given name of South African origin, meaning "sweet". Notable people with the given name include:

- Mandisa Hundley (1976–2024), known mononymously as Mandisa, American gospel singer
- Mandisa Makesini (fl. 2014–present), South African politician
- Mandisa Mashego (born 1973), South African politician and feminist
- Mandisa Maya (born 1964), South African judge
- Mandisa Mfeka (fl. 2008–present), South African pilot
- Mandisa Monakali (died 2024), South African public speaker, lobbyist, educator, social worker and community organizer
- Mandisa Stevenson (born 1982), American basketball player
- Mandisa Thomas (born 1976), American atheist activist
- Mandisa Williams (born 1984), South African rugby union player
