= Rhodes High School =

Rhodes High School may refer to:

- E. Washington Rhodes High School in Philadelphia, Pennsylvania
- James Ford Rhodes High School in Cleveland, Ohio
- Rhodes High School (South Africa), Western Cape
