= JMS =

JMS may refer to:

== Buildings ==
- EverBank Field, formerly known as Jacksonville Municipal Stadium, a sports stadium in Jacksonville, Florida
- Johannesburg Muslim School, a private school in Johannesburg, South Africa
- John Mason School, a secondary school in Abingdon, Oxfordshire
- Japan Mobility Show, a biennial auto show in Japan.

== Computing ==
- Japanese MapleStory, a version of the Korean game, Maplestory
- Java Message Service, a Java message-oriented middleware application programming interface for sending messages between two or more clients
- Java Module System, a Java specification for collections of Java code and related resources

== People ==
- J. Michael Straczynski (born 1954), contemporary fiction and television writer
- Jamie McLeod-Skinner (born 1967), American politician
- John Maynard Smith (1920–2004), geneticist and evolutionary theorist
- John Michael Stipe, known as Michael Stipe (born 1960), lead singer of the band R.E.M.
- Julio María Sanguinetti (born 1936), President of Uruguay
- Jung Myung Seok (born 1945), leader of Providence religious movement

== Publications ==
- Journal of Management Studies, Management studies journal
- Journal of Mass Spectrometry, a scientific journal dedicated to mass spectrometry
- Journal of Materials Science, materials science journal
- The Journal of Men's Studies, social studies journal

== Others ==
- Jesus Morning Star, also known as Providence, a religious movement founded by Jung Myung Seok
- Jamestown Regional Airport, North Dakota, U.S.
