= Shoki Mokgapa =

South African actress (1984-2018)

- Born: 17 August 1984; Johannesburg, South Africa
- Died: 26 September 2018 (aged 34); Johannesburg, South Africa
- Occupation: Actress
- Years active: 2008–2018

Shoki Mokgapa (17 August 1984 – 26 September 2018) was a South African actress. She was best known for her role as Rachel in the film Sink.

== Early life ==
Mokgapa was born in Johannesburg. She had a brother Tshepiso and a stepsister Ntsako Mokadikwa. She spent her early childhood in Soweto before her family moved to Johannesburg's northern suburbs. Fluent in English and SeSotho, Mokgapa attended Michael Mount Waldorf School and took A Levels at the British International College. She pursued a Bachelor of Communications before going on to train at the Johannesburg campus of AFDA, graduating with a Bachelor of Arts in Performing Arts.

== Career ==
In 2008, Mokgapa made her television debut in the second season of the SABC3 drama series The Lab. In the series, she played the role of Tumi, the Pearl Lusipho's personal assistant, for three seasons.

Mokgapa was "instrumental" in helping to co-found the POPArt Theatre at the Maboneng Precinct, which opened its doors in 2011.

On British television, Mokgapa appeared in the ITV series Wild at Heart in 2008 and then in the BBC drama Silent Witness in 2010. Meanwhile, she appeared in Hollywood films such as Retribution (2011) and Dredd (2012). In 2013, she appeared in the second season of the SABC1 drama Intersexions as Gadima. That same year, she made a minor role in the biographical film Mandela: Long Walk to Freedom.

In 2015, she gained prominence through her role as Disebo in the second season of the e.tv soap opera Ashes to Ashes. In 2016, she appeared in the Sri Lankan feature film A Love Like This directed by Chandran Rutnam which was shot in the Seychelles.

In 2017, Mokgapa played Rachel Nyaga in the Afrikaans-language film Sink. For her performance, she won Best Actress in a Feature Film category at the 11th Annual South African Film and Television Awards (SAFTAs). Then in 2018, she won the Best Actress Award at the kykNET Silwerskermfees Festival for the same role, becoming the first non-Afrikaans speaking actress to win the award. In mid 2018, she appeared in the Amazon Prime Video miniseries The Looming Tower. She made her final film appearance in Jahmil X.T. Qubeka's Sew the Winter to My Skin, South Africa's 2019 submission in the Oscars' foreign film category.

== Death ==
Mokgapa suffered from clinical depression and anxiety for a long time. She committed suicide on 25 September 2018 in Johannesburg at the age of 34.

A memorial event was held on 2 October 2018 at the Market Theatre.

== Filmography ==
=== Film ===
Year	Title	Role	Notes
2006	Perana		Short film
2007	Brothers in Arms: 1978	Angolan Woman	
2010	The First Grader	Teacher Elizabeth	
2011	Retribution	Thembi Maphosa	
2012	Dredd	Woman with Child	
2013	Mandela: Long Walk to Freedom	Lady in Nightclub	
2013	Nothing for Mahala	Pule	
2015	Sink	Rachel Nyaga	
2016	The Chemo Club	Ruby	
2016	A Love Like This		
2017	Bypass	Sister Mmaya	
2017	Reality	Mage	Short film
2018	Sew the Winter to My Skin		

=== Television ===
Year	Title	Role	Notes
2007	Life Is Wild	Shoki	
2008	Wild at Heart	Susie	
2008	The Lab	Tumi	
2010	Silent Witness	Kudzai Marechera	
2011	Sokhulu & Partners	Reporter	
2013	Intersexions	Gadima	
2015	Those Who Can't	Lindiwe	
2015	Ashes to Ashes	Disebo	
2017	Swartwater	Boitumelo	
2018	The Docket		Guest role
2018	The Looming Tower	Secretary	Miniseries

== Awards and nominations ==
Year	Award	Category	Work	Result	Ref
2017	South African Film and Television Awards	Best Actress in a Film	Sink	Won	
2017	Silwerskerm Film Festival	Best Actress	Sink	Won	
