= Association of Muslim Schools (SA) =

Educational organization based in South Africa

- Established: 1989
- Location: South Africa
- Website: www.ams-sa.org.za

The Association of Muslim Schools (SA) is a national network of Muslim Schools in South Africa.

The association consists of 68 schools nationally. AMS-SA encompasses both primary and high schools as well as independent and state-aided schools. It is active in 3 of 9 South African provinces.

== History ==
AMS-SA was formed in March 1989 at Al Falaah College, known as Lockhat Islamia College at the time. The primary members of the association were:Habibiya Islamic College, Lockhat Islamia College, Roshnee Islamic School, As-Salaam, Lenasia Muslim School and Nur-ul-Islam School. The association was formally launched on 13 May 1989 during the first AMS conference at Lenasia Muslim School. AMS was mandated to facilitate the following:

- Administrative collaboration
- Educator development workshops
- Evaluation/moderation of final examination papers
- Inter-school sports
- Subject-based workshops
- A community outreach programme

AMS-SA has grown steadily over the years. The annual general meeting and teachers' conference has attracted many prominent personalities from the educational field over the years. The association further has a managers' conference and a principals' forum that engage at a regular basis. Currently the association consists of 68 schools nationally. It is further recognized by and regularly engages with the national and provincial educational departments, South African Council for Teachers (SACE), Umalusi (National accreditation body for independent schools), Sector Education and Training Authority (SETA).

== Chapters ==
AMS-SA comprises three chapters which meet annually at the National AMS AGM and Education Conference. Each chapter has the following member schools:

=== KwaZulu-Natal ===
- Al Falaah College
- As-Salaam Education Institute
- Al-Azhar School of Durban
- Anjuman School
- Crescent Girls High
- Hartley Road Primary
- Ihsaan Boys College
- Ihsaan Girl's College
- Islamic College Newcastle
- Islamic Education Centre
- Islamia Muslim School
- Juma Masjid Primary
- Maritzburg Muslim School
- Masakhane School
- Mohammed Ebrahim Islamic School
- Newcastle Islamic
- Nizamia Islamic School
- Orient Islamic School
- Phoenix Muslim School
- Pietermaritzburg Islamia
- Port Shepstone Islamic School
- Siratul Haq
- South Coast Madressa Primary
- Tongaat Islamic School
- Umzinto Islamic School
- Verulam Islamic School
- Zakariyya Muslim School

=== Gauteng ===
- Al-Nur Muslim School
- Welkom Muslim School
- Al- Aqsa School
- Al Asr School
- Al Azar School
- Al Ghazali School
- Auckland Park Academy of Excellence
- Azaadville Muslim School
- Benoni Muslim School
- Bosmont Muslim School
- Central Islamic School
- Eldorado Park Muslim School
- Johannesburg Muslim School
- Lenasia Muslim School
- Markaz- Ad Dawah Al-Islamia
- Nur-ul-Islam School
- PMT Sunni School
- Roshnee Islamic School
- Sama School
- Springs Muslim School
- Tshwane Muslim School
- Highveld Muslim School
- Middleburg Muslim School
- Northern Muslim School
- Al-Huda Muslim School
- Nurul Iman Muslim School

=== Western Cape ===
- Al-Azhar Primary School
- Al-Azhar High School
- Belhar Education College
- Crescent Primary
- Darul Arqam High School
- Darul Islam High School
- Darun Na'im Academy
- Greenies Academia
- Hidayatul Islam Primary School
- Ieglasi Nieyah Primary School
- Islamia College
- Jam 'Eyyatul Qurra'
- Junior College
- Madrassatur Raja
- Madrassatur Tarbiyah
- Mitchells Plain High School
- Oracle High School
- Savvy College
- TLC Primary School Hyde Park
- TLC High School Surrey Estate

== Affiliations ==
The Association of Muslim Schools is a founding member of the National Alliance of Independent Schools of South Africa (NAISA). This is an umbrella body representing independent schools associations and "Joint Liaison Committees". AMS-SA is the South African Chapter of the Association of Muslim Schools.

== Competitions ==
The Association of Muslim Schools holds annual inter-school tournaments and competitions.

== Sports Competitions ==
The Association of Muslim Schools hold Annual Sports Tournaments between Muslim Schools across the country.

=== Provincial Soccer Tournament KZN ===
The Association of Muslim Schools holds an annual Astro soccer tournament in the province of Kwazulu Natal. The 2024 tournament took place May and was held in 3 locations namely Orient Islamic School, Al Falaah College and Hartley Road Primary School. The finals took place at Hartley Road and had an estimated 5000 people watching the games.

==== 2024 Finals Winners ====
- Under 9 Division - Hartley Road Primary School
- Under 11 Division - Al Falaah College
- Under 13 Division - Al Falaah College
- Under 15 Division - Al Falaah College
- Under 17 Division - Orient Islamic School
- Under 19 Division - Orient Islamic School

=== National Soccer Tournament ===
The Association of Muslim Schools holds an annual 7 a side soccer tournament and differs on location every year. The 2024 tournament took place from the 20–22 September at the Siripat Grounds, Reservoir Hills, Durban and included most of the Muslim schools across the country. Schools played in the Under 9 - Under 17 divisions

==== Final Scores ====
- Under 9 Division - Houghton Muslim Academy winners after beating Roshnee Islamic School 1-0
- Under 11 Division - Al Falaah College winners after beating Houghton Muslim Academy 1-0
- Under 13 Division - Benoni Muslim School winners after beating Roshnee Islamic School 1-0
- Under 15 Division - Orient Islamic School winners after beating Islamia College 1-0
- Under 17 Division - Lenasia Muslim School winners after beating Orient Islamic School 3-2 on penalties

==== Slogan of 2024 National AMS Tournament ====
Uniting our youth through sport

=== Other Sports Codes ===
The Association of Muslim Schools also holds many other sporting events such as:

- Provincial Swimming Gala
- Provincial Volleyball Tournaments
- Provincial Athletics Tournaments
