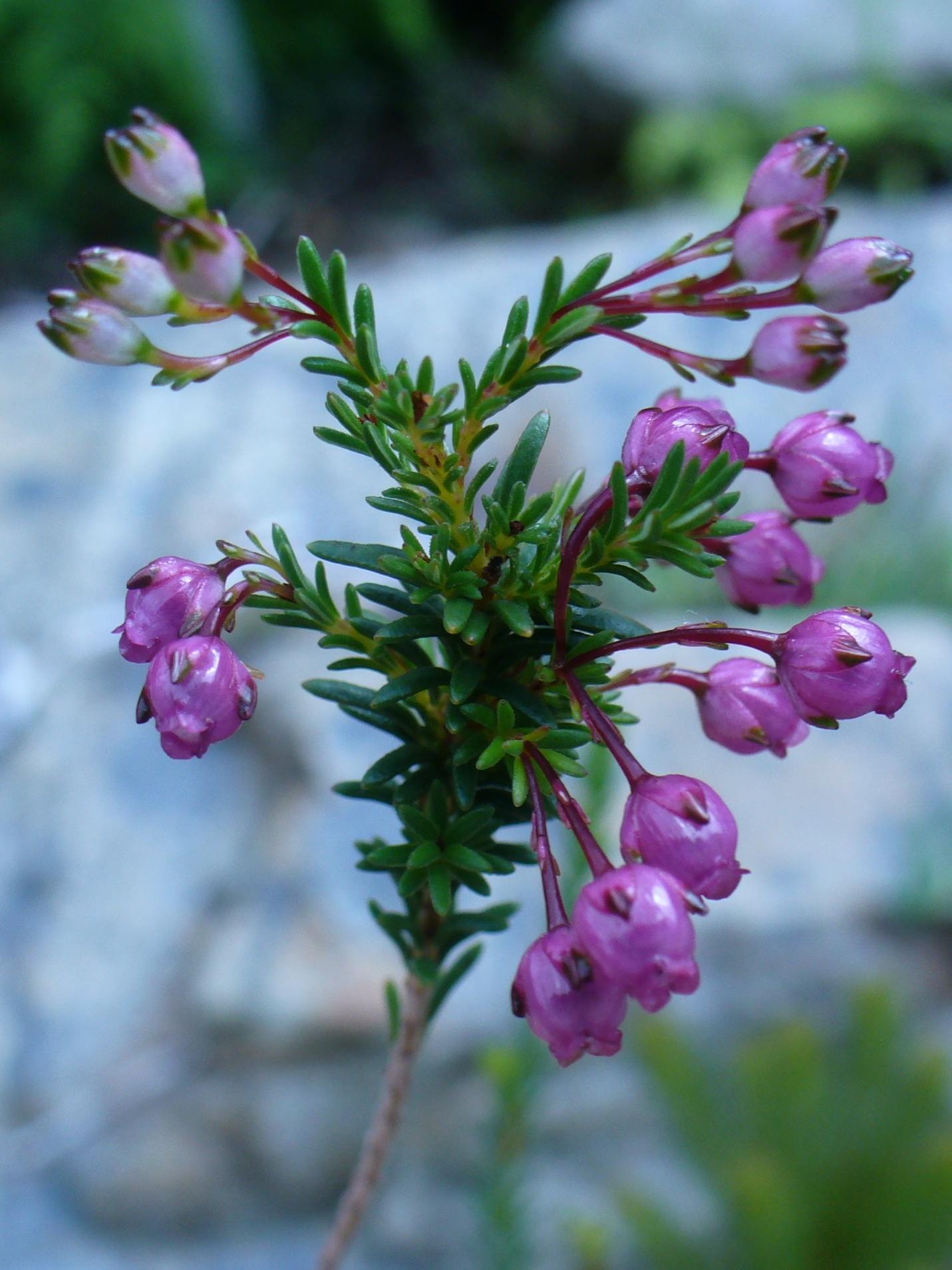

Scientific classification
- Kingdom: Plantae
- Clade: Tracheophytes
- Clade: Angiosperms
- Clade: Eudicots
- Clade: Asterids
- Order: Ericales
- Family: Ericaceae
- Genus: Erica
- Species: E. ferrea

Binomial name
- Erica ferrea P.J.Bergius, (1767)

Synonyms
- Erica crenata E.Mey. ex Benth.; Erica mucosa L.; Erica pilularis G.Lodd. ex J.Forbes; Erica pilulifera Andrews; Ericoides mucosum (L.) Kuntze

= Erica ferrea =

Iron Heath

Species of flowering plant

Erica ferrea, the iron heath, is a plant belonging to the genus Erica and forming part of the fynbos. The species is endemic to the Western Cape. Parts of the plant's habitat have been lost, between Muizenberg, Table View, Kraaifontein and Eerste River, from 2 415 km² to 916 km². It still occurs from Yzerfontein to Malmesbury and the Cape Flats.
