= Folweni =

Town in KwaZulu-Natal, South Africa

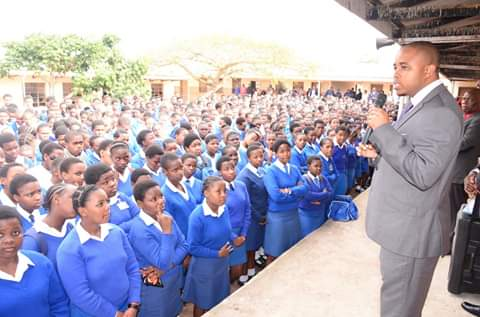
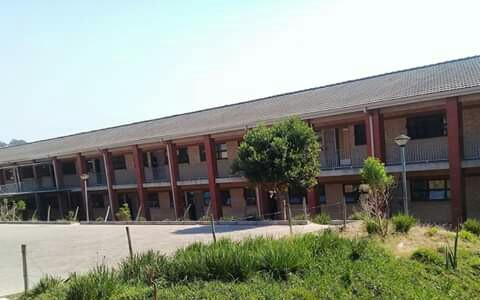
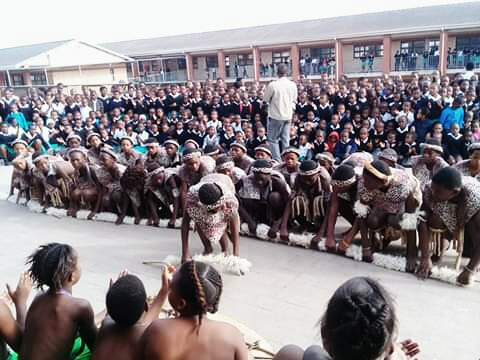
- From top, left to right: Sun rising at Folweni, Morning assembly at Folweni high school, Angle view of Masuku primary school, Heritage day performance at Masuku primary school.

- Location within KwaZulu-Natal Location within South Africa
- Coordinates: 29.739°S 30.949°E
- Country: South Africa
- Province: KwaZulu-Natal
- Municipality: eThekwini

Area
  - Total: 3.40 km^{2} (1.31 sq mi)

Population (2013)
  - Total: 30,402
  - Density: 8,945/km^{2} (23,170/sq mi)

Racial makeup (2011)
  - Black African: 99.9%
  - Other: 0.1%

First languages (2011)
  - Zulu: 99.9%
  - Other: 0.1%
- Time zone: UTC+2 (SAST)
- Postal code: 4110

Folweni is a small middle income town located south of Durban in the province of KwaZulu-Natal, South Africa.

== Sections ==
Folweni is divided into three sections namely;

- A-section
- B-section
- C-section

The three sections of folweni

== History ==
The original population of Folweni were people who stayed in Umlazi who were forced to migrate when the apartheid government implemented the Group Areas Act.

On 26 July 1992 During the political conflict between the ANC and the IFP, a group of men believed to be IFP loyalists armed with AK47s descended on Folweni and killed approximately 20 people who were attending a ceremony, the event is now known as the Folweni Massacre.

== Health Care ==
Folweni Clinic

Folweni Clinic is currently the main source of health care. It is located in the B-section of the town.

== Education ==
=== High schools ===
- Folweni High School
- Ntwenhle High School
- Siphephele High School
- Isolemamba High School

=== Primary schools ===
- Masuku Primary School
- Hlengisizwe Primary School
- Mklomelo Junior Primary School
- Golokodo Primary School
- Celubuhle Senior Primary Secondary School
- Dabulizizwe Primary School
- Phembisizwe Primary School

== Notable people ==
- Njabulo Ngcobo, footballer
