= Shirley Machaba =

South African accountant

- Born: Jabavu, Soweto, South Africa
- Citizenship: South African
- Education: University of Venda (BCom in Accounting); Postgraduate Diploma in Auditing & Accounting, University of South Africa; Diploma in Integrated Reporting, University of Pretoria; Diploma in Corporate Governance, Duke University
- Occupations: Chartered accountant, business executive
- Known for: First black African woman CEO of PwC Southern Africa
- Title: Chief Executive Officer, PwC Southern Africa
- Awards: Finalist, Africa’s Most Influential Women in Business and Government (2013); Audit Partner of the Year, African Women Chartered Accountants (2016); Big 4 Professional of the Year, South African Professional Services Awards (2018); Woman Professional of the Year, South African Professional Services Awards (2018); Nominee, Business Women of the Year (2018)

Shirley Machaba is a South African chartered accountant. She is the first black woman to be appointed Chief Executive Officer for PwC Southern Africa, an accounting firm in South Africa.

== Early years ==
Machaba was born in Jabavu in Soweto, where she lived with her grandmother and siblings.

== Education ==
She had her primary education and secondary education at Jabavu Primary School and Vhulaudzi Secondary School in Tshitavha in Venda respectively. She later furthered at the University of Venda, where she graduated with a bachelor of commerce degree in accounting. She holds a postgraduate diploma in auditing & accounting from the University of South Africa. She holds two additional diplomas in Integrated Reporting from the University of Pretoria and Corporate Governance from Duke University.

== Career ==
After acquiring her degree, she worked part time as a junior internal auditor at the Auditor-General's office and a lecturer at the University of Venda. In May 2019, she was appointed chief executive officer for PwC Southern Africa, making her the first black African woman to occupy such position.

Prior to that, spent nearly a decade working at the Auditor-General's office occupying a variety of positions, including Assistant Auditor, Senior Auditor, Accountant and Performance Audit Manager. She also worked at the Department of Justice in South Africa for nearly half a decade. There, she became the Head of the Internal Auditing unit by the time she left the department in 2004. In 2005 she joined PwC.

Machaba was president of the Institute of Internal Auditors of South Africa for 2011 - 2014, and subsequently the Chairman of the Institute Relations Committee of the Institute of Internal Auditors.

== Awards ==
Some of the awards she has won and been nominated for include:

- 2013 - She was a finalist in the Africa’s Most Influential Women in Business and Government awards
- 2016 - She was honoured as Audit Partner of the Year by African Women Chartered Accountants
- 2018 - She was honoured as one of the Big 4 Professional of the Year by the South African Professional Services Awards
- 2018 - She was awarded the overall ‘Woman Professional of the Year’ by the South African Professional Services Awards.
- 2018 - She is also a nominee for the 2018 Business Women of the Year BWA award to be announced before the end of the year
