= A Love Like This (2016 film) =

2016 film by Chandran Rutnam

A Love Like This is a 2016 romantic drama directed by Chandran Rutnam.

The film, shot in the Seychelles, was the first fruit of the Africa Film Factory, established in 2014 to boost film-making collaboration in the Seychelles. Also involved in producing the film were the Southern African Broadcasting Association, Seychelles Broadcasting Corporation, High Street Riviera, Chandran Rutnam's Film Location Services and Golden Effects Pictures.

A Love Like This, starring Gabriel Afolayan, Shoki Mokgapa and Camila Estico, premiered in Mahé, Seychelles in July 2016.
