= Tsogo High School =

Tsogo Secondary School

Location
- Stand 2396, R C Mission, Mmakau, 0194; South Africa; 25.6064°S 27.9441°E

Information
- Type: Independent school
- Motto: Mercy
- Established: 1975
- Principal: Matshepo Makgae
- Grades: 8 - 12
- Colors: Green and gold
- Website: www.cso.za.org/Member-Schools/Pretoria/Tsogo-High-School

Tsogo Secondary School is a school founded on ethos of Roman Catholic Church. It is an English medium High School located on the Most Holy Redeemer Catholic Church campus in Mmakau North West of the City of Tshwane, in the North West Province of South Africa. When the school was founded the Sisters of Mercy were at the helm of its administration.

== History ==
Tsogo Secondary School (formerly Tsogo High School) was established at the request of the Stigmatine Fathers by the Sister of Mercy in January 1975. ‘Tsogo’ is a Setswana name meaning ‘Resurrection' - thus, since the school was founded on Catholic ethos, the name translates to the 'Resurrection of Christ'.

=== Beginning ===
The story of Tsogo Secondary School begins with the Catholic (Sisters of Mercy) . The Sisters of Mercy are a Catholic Women Religious Congregation founded in Dublin, Ireland which dates back to the 1970s and has amongst other things worked to establish community centres, schools, adult education centres and various centres across the country and globe. The Congregation has worked for over 30 years to assist and uplift communities through Christianity and philosophies of collectivism and self-help.

=== Tsogo Today ===
The school's campus also houses a primary school, Morekolodi Primary School and a preschool, Motsweding. In addition, the campus houses a community centre, an adult education centre, a church, a health centre, a refugee centre and a convent. The school is housed in a campus that gives learners an opportunity to interact with the community in some activities and therefore gain from social interaction and community work. The school has a small library, computer room, science and biology laboratories, technology room and a newly built mathematics lab.

The school has produced many successful alumni who have gone on to achieve success in their academic undertakings and careers. The majority of learners from the school come from the villages of Mmakau, Bethanie, Hebron and nearby townships of (Garankuwa|Ga-Rankuwa), (Mothotlung),(Mabopane), (Rankotea) and (Soshanguve). The community centre, called Mmashiko offers adult education. The community centre, which is adjacent to the school offers classes such as computer literacy, sewing and dressmaking, and bricklaying.

== Subjects ==
- Setswana
- English
- Afrikaans
- Biology
- Physical Science
- Business Economics
- Mathematics
- Maths Literacy
- Additional Mathematics
- Accounting
- History
- Life Orientation Skills

== Honours ==
- Tsogo is a Dinaledi school

== Notable alumni ==
=== Arts and media ===
- Tim Modise

=== Business ===
- Patrice Motsepe
- Kgoadi Malatse
- Dan Marokane
- Thabo Ncalo, Mandela Washington Fellow, Harvard University Fellow, TEDx speaker, Head of Investment Strategy for Old Mutual Limited

=== Medicine ===
- Dr. Gomolemo Mokae, author, medical doctor and political commentator

=== Sciences and engineering ===
- Ramatsemela Mphahlele
- Dr. Vukosi Marivate, PhD (Rutgers, N.J), Harvard University Fellow
