= Table View High School =

High school in Table View, Cape Town, South Africa

Location
- Janssens Avenue, Table View; Cape Town, Western Cape, 7441; South Africa
- 33.8312°S 18.4983°E

Information
- Funding type: Public (some fees)
- Motto: Optima Petamus (We strive for the best)
- Established: 1986
- Founder: Mr Waller
- School district: District 9
- Headmaster: Ms. R Cummings
- Staff: 100 full-time
- Grades: 8–12
- Gender: Boys & Girls
- Age: 14 to 18
- Enrollment: 1,100
- Language: English & Afrikaans
- Schedule: 07:30 - 14:30; 07:30 - 13:30 on Tuesdays
- Campus: Urban Campus
- Campus type: Suburban
- Houses: Baird; Graaff; Janssens; Pentz
- Colours: Navy; Khaki; White
- Nickname: Viewies
- Accreditation: Western Cape Education Department
- Newspaper: Viewsion
- School fees: R24,000
- Feeder schools: Table View Primary School
- Website: www.tvh.co.za

Table View High School is a public English medium high school, was founded in 1986 in Table View, near Cape Town, and is a public school that enrolls both boys and girls (co-educational). The school is financially assisted by the Western Cape Education Department and therefore, like most other schools in South Africa, it charges a school fee, as regulated by the South African Schools Act. The school's current principal as of 2018 is Ms. R Cummings.

== Academics ==
The school performs well when it comes to academics. A 100% matric pass rate has been achieved for 11 years in a row (2000 to 2011) and again in 2018.

TVHS offers a variety of subjects.

In Grades 8 and 9 there are nine compulsory subjects:

- English (Home Language or First Additional Language)
- [Afrikaans] (Home Language or First Additional Language)
- Mathematics (FET)
- Life Orientation
- Natural Sciences
- Social Sciences (Geography & History)
- Economic and Management Sciences
- Technology
- Creative Arts (Art and Drama)

Once pupils reach their senior phase (Grades 10 - 12) they are given a choice of subjects. Pupils take two languages, maths, Life Orientation and choose 3 subjects:

- Mathematics (Pure or Literacy)
- English Home Language
- Afrikaans First Additional Language
- Life Orientation
- Physical Sciences
- Life Sciences
- Geography
- History
- Hospitality Studies
- Business Studies
- Accounting
- Computer Applications Technology (CAT)
- Visual Art
- Design

== Sport ==
Sports offered at the school are, certain sports are only played during either the Summer or Winter Season:

Boys

- Rugby
- Cricket
- Hockey
- Tennis
- Squash
- Hockey 5s
- First Aid
- Chess
- Cross Country

Girls

- Netball
- Hockey
- Tennis
- Squash
- Softball
- Hockey 5s
- First Aid
- Chess
- Cross Country

Girls and boys both have the option of becoming cricket scorers.

== Activities ==
Culture and service activities offered at the school include:

- "Viewsion" - school newspaper
- Choir
- Debating
- Public Speaking
- Road Safety
- Safety Patrol
- Christian Action
- Audio-Visual
- Library Monitors
- Drama club (acting club)
- Music Club (band)
- Photography
- Marketing
- Interact
- Eco club
- Catering
- Fashion and Art

== Notable alumni ==
• Oros Mampofu - Actor
• Roxy Ingram - Model
