= Ntebogang Secondary School =

Public secondary school in Dinokana, Ngaka Modiri Molema, South Africa

Location
- 1486 Seferella Section, Dinokana, 2868; Dinokana, North West Province; South Africa; 25.451°S 25.870°E

Information
- Type: Public
- Motto: We shall toil
- Established: 1985
- Principal: Dipale OG
- Grades: 8 - 12
- Enrolment: 521
- Colours: Navy, Blue, White

Ntebogang Secondary School is a public high school located in Dinokana, near Zeerust, in South Africa’s North West Province, district, Ngaka Modiri Molema. Established in 1985, the school serves learners from Grades 8 to 12 and operates under the North West Department of Education.

== History ==
The school was established in 1985 as a middle school before transitioning into a secondary institution when the middle school system was phased out. It was named in honour of Kgosi Ntebogang Moiloa of the Bahurutshe ba ga Moiloa people. The founding principal was Mr. M. C. Mteto (1985–1999), followed by Mr. E. N. Pule (2000–2016). Since 2017, the school has been led by Mr. O. G. Dipale.

== Governance ==
Ntebogang Secondary School is managed by a School Governing Body (SGB) composed of parents, educators, learners, and support staff members.

School Governing Body (SGB) Composition
Representation	Number
Parents	7
Teachers	2
Learners	2
Support staff	1
Principal	1

The teaching staff structure follows the Post Provisioning Model (PPM):

Post Provisioning Model
Position	Number
Principal	1
Deputy Principal	1
Departmental Heads	2
Teachers	14
Total	18

== School structure ==
The school offers Grades 8 through 12. Support staff include administrative, cleaning, and food service personnel.

Support Staff
Position	Number
Administrative assistant	1
Food handlers	3
Cleaners	5
Night watchmen	2
Total	11

== Admissions ==
Admission is open to learners residing primarily in Dinokana and surrounding rural communities. The school falls under the Ramotshere Moiloa Local Municipality in the Ngaka Modiri Molema District Municipality and follows provincial admission policies set by the North West Department of Education.

== Extracurricular activities ==
Ntebogang Secondary School promotes a variety of extracurricular activities in both sports and culture.

Extracurricular Activities
Category	Activities
Sports	Athletics, Soccer, Netball, Volleyball, Chess
Culture	Choral music, Gumboot dance, African drums, Poetry

== Campus ==
The school campus is situated approximately 30 kilometres (19 mi) west of Zeerust and 2 kilometres (1.2 mi) from the N4 route to Lobatse, in the Seferella section of Dinokana. Facilities include general classrooms, science laboratories, and sports fields.

The official school colours are navy, blue, and white. The uniform includes:

- White shirts and navy trousers or skirts
- Navy jerseys with white and sky-blue stripes
- Sky-blue tunics for girls and navy blazers for both genders

== Former headteachers ==
- M. C. Mteto – founding principal (1985–1999)
- E. N. Pule – principal (2000–2016)
- O. G. Dipale – current principal (2017–present)
