= Table View Primary School =

Location
- Fair Way; Table View, Western Cape, 7441; South Africa
- Coordinates: 33.8344°S 18.5139°E

Information
- Type: Primary School
- Motto: Loyalty - Faith - Success
- Religious affiliations: Christianity; Non-Aligned
- Established: January 20, 1971
- Principal: Mrs. S.J. Akerman
- Deputy Principal, Foundation Phase: Mrs. C. Van Rensburg
- Deputy Principal, INTERSEN Phase: Ms. E. Strauss
- Deputy Principal, INTERSEN Phase: Mr. H. De Bruyn
- Grades: R–7
- Enrollment: 1,800
- Language: Afrikaans, English
- Feeder to: Table View High School
- Website: www.tvps.co.za

Table View Primary School (Afrikaans: Laerskool Table View) is a parallel medium school located in Table View, a west coast suburb of Cape Town in the Western Cape province of South Africa. The school has about 1,800 learners and 80 teachers. There is a strong emphasis on sports, culture and academics.

== Sports ==
The different summer sport activities offered to learners are cricket, swimming, tennis, and athletics. Winter sports consist of rugby, hockey, netball, cross country, and biathlon. Learners also take part in chess and table tennis.

The school houses—Rietvlei, Blouberg, and Atlanta—participate in an annual inter-house athletics competition in November. The top athletes go through to District North Athletics Championships, where they are selected for the Western Province Championships.

== Culture ==
There are two choirs, a Junior Choir and a Senior Choir. TVPS achieves great success at the Tygerberg International Eisteddfod. Learners take part in prepared and unprepared reading, poetry and art.

== Curriculum ==
Table View Primary's curriculum is laid down by the Western Cape Education Department. All the teachers from Grade R to 7 are trained for Curriculum Assessment Policy Statements (CAPS).

=== Subjects ===
- Afrikaans Home Language or First Additional Language
- English Home Language or First Additional Language
- Mathematics
- Natural Sciences and Technology
- Social Sciences
- Economic and Managements Sciences
- Life Skills
  - Physical Education
  - Creative Arts
  - Personal and Social Well-being
