= Ashton International College =

Private college in South Africa

Coordinates: 26°08′46″S 28°17′33″E

Ashton International College is a South African English-medium private school with two branches, situated in Benoni, Gauteng (Ekurhuleni) and Ballito (KwaDukuza), Kwa-Zulu Natal. The college's motto is Sedulis Praestantia (Excellence Belongs to the Zealous).

== History ==
The Ashton Senior College was founded on 13 December 1996 by Mr Andre Buys and opened its doors to its founder students in January 1998. In 2002, the Ashton Junior College opened.

== Management ==
The junior and senior college principals of the Benoni branch are Mr Grobler and Ms L. Felix, respectively.

== Structure ==
Ashton International College consists of three units: a pre-primary (a.k.a. kindergarten), junior college (from Grade 1 to 7) and a senior college (from Form 1/Grade 8 to Form 5/Grade 12).

== Facilities ==
The Benoni branch of Ashton International College boasts the following facilities:

- Rhinoturf sports field;
- 25m swimming pool;
- Three biology and three science laboratories;
- Computer laboratory with 3D printing capabilities;
- Tuckshop;
- Junior music room with marimbas and piano; and an
- Auditorium.

== Curriculum ==
The Senior College offers curricula and examinations from the Cambridge and Independent Examinations Board, with the former being the most encouraged. Grade 8/Form 1 students are required to take a mixture of the syllabi, before choosing which curriculum and subjects they would like to take in the next year.
