= Folweni High School =

High school in KwaZulu-Natal

Coordinates: 29.9924°S 30.8118°E

Folweni High School is a public state high school in the A-section of Folweni in KwaZulu-Natal, South Africa. It is located south west of Durban.
