= Leolo Technical High School =

School situated in Praktiseer, South Africa next to Burgersfort

Location
- Tubatse, Burgersfort, South Africa
- Coordinates: 24.57547°S 30.32516°E

Information
- School type: Public school
- Motto: Do it yourself (English)
- Established: 1960
- Head teacher: M.W Mathebula
- Staff: approx. 100 full-time
- Enrollment: Approximately 500 pupils
- Colors: Yellow, Blue and White
- Governing Authority: Limpopo Department of Education

Leolo Technical High School is a school situated in Praktiseer, South Africa near Burgersfort. The school was designated a technical school, and is known for producing a competitive debater and a published poet. As of 2020, the principal was William Mathebula.
