= Pretoria Secondary School =

School in Pretoria, South Africa

Pretoria Secondary School is a public, English-speaking high school in Pretoria, Gauteng, South Africa.

The school does not have a website as of yet
