= Mathunjwa High School =

Location
- Vryheid, KwaZulu Natal; South Africa

Mathunjwa High School is a public (government-funded) school in Vryheid, KwaZulu Natal, South Africa. The student body is not well off (according to the Principal, around half of the students could not afford the R100 school fee), however the school has consistently good results in university matriculation examinations and had 100% pass rate and endorsement rates in 2005.
