= Port Alfred High School =

Port Alfred School
- Port Alfred, Eastern Cape; South Africa

Information
- Type: State
- Motto: "facta non verba" (Deeds and not words)
- Established: 1883
- Locale: Suburban
- School number: 046 624 2440
- Headmaster: Mr Nigel Adams (former head teacher, let go due to sexual misconduct)
- Grades: Pre-primary - Grade 12
- Enrollment: 800 Boys and Girls
- Colors: Red and Blue
- Website: www.portalfredschool.co.za

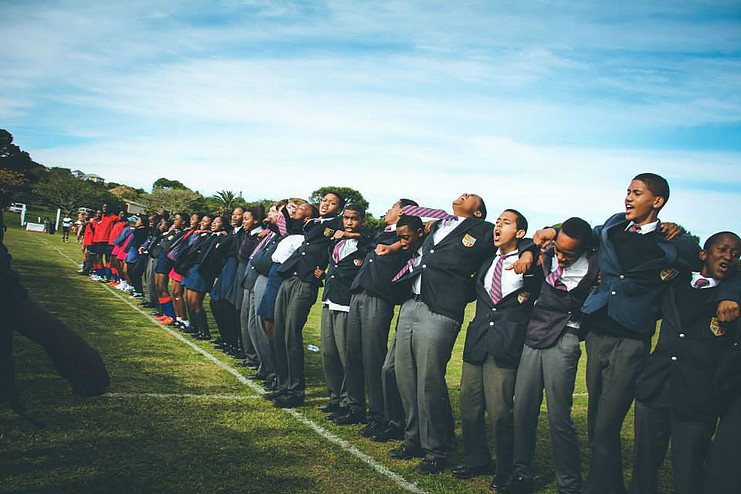
A group of Port Alfred High School students cheering for the first team rugby players using their war cry "die leeu" (the lion)

Port Alfred School is a state run, co-educational school located in the coastal town of Port Alfred, Eastern Cape, South Africa.

The Port Alfred School community celebrates its origin at a Founders Day Assembly in August each year, a celebration in which everyone takes the time to reflect on how far the town's oldest school has come since 1883, the year that the school was officially converted into a Government School and it was housed in an Anglican church building in Park Road. The school then had an enrollment of about fifty boys and girls.

Over the intervening years, the school has grown to nearly 1000 children from creche to Matric situated on a campus formerly known as Alexandra Park on the R72.

The school's motto is "Facta Non Verba" meaning "Deeds and not Words". Honesty, integrity, grit and determination, per- severance, loyalty, and commitment are qualities held in high regard by one and all at Port Alfred High.
