= Ntwenhle High School =

School in South Africa

Coordinates: 30.0013°S 30.8364°E

Ntwenhle High School is a public state secondary school in the Golokodo area of Folweni in the province of KwaZulu-Natal, South Africa. It is located south west of Durban.
