= St. Nicholas Diocesan School =

Coordinates: 29°36′38″S 30°22′25″E

Information
- Established: 1990; 36 years ago
- Grades: RR-12
- Gender: Mixed
- Website: www.stnicholas.co.za

St. Nicholas Diocesan School is a diocesan Anglican school, located in Pietermaritzburg, Kwa-Zulu Natal, South Africa, founded in 1990. St. Nicholas is an independent school catering for boys and girls in Grades RR to 12, and is a member of the Independent Schools Association of Southern Africa.

== Notable alumni ==
Ntokozo Dlamini - actor
