= Pro Arte Alphen Park =

Uitsig primary school

Location
- Pro Arte Alphen Park; C/O Roeline & Selati Street; Alphen Park 0081; Alphen Park, Pretoria; Pretoria, Gauteng; South Africa; 25°46′55″S 28°15′50″E

Information
- Type: Government & Boarding
- Motto: Latin: Vigor et Veritas
- Religious affiliation: Christianity
- Established: 1994; 32 years ago
- Principal: Mr JA du Rand
- Grades: 8–12
- Gender: Boys & Girls
- Age: 14 to 18
- Schedule: 08:00 - 14:00
- Hours in school day: 6h30
- Campus: Urban Campus
- Campus type: Suburban
- Houses: Phoenix, Sphinx, Pegasus, Gryphon
- Colors: Blue; Maroon; White
- Song: Vigor et Veritas
- Nickname: Pro Arte
- Newspaper: Oracle
- Website: www.proarte.co.za

Pro Arte Alphen Park is a government school specialising in the creative and performing arts situated in the suburb of Alphen Park in Pretoria in Gauteng province of South Africa. It also has boarding facilities, It is produces good academic results every year.

== General information ==
Located in Pretoria's eastern suburbs, Pro Arte Alphen Park is an English High School.

== History ==
The history of the school began in 1964, when a commercial, Afrikaans medium school was built in the suburb of Alphen Park across the Ashlea Gardens estate. The school was successful in attracting students who wanted to pursue a career in the financial services sector which was growing steadily at that time. The school accommodated over 800 students and operated for 30 years until 1994.

Concurrently, the Pretoria school of Art, music and ballet was operating on the grounds of Pretoria Boys High School which is now the Pollock campus of Boys High. The arrangement was temporary as it seems that the state was planning on financing the construction of a new art school in Pretoria with its own grounds and facilities.

By the 1980s, the state of South Africa had great economic pressures due to the political context of the time and as a result, there was a shortage of funds that could be utilized to construct a new arts school from fresh. A decision was taken by the Transvaal department of education to move the art school from Pollock campus to the grounds of the commercial school in Alphen Park. The process of integrating the two schools was completed by 1992 and by 1994, the school started operating as a new, fully integrated Pro Arte Alphen Park.

This school focused school of specialisation with attention paid to the arts and enterprise management.

Today, the school continues in its tradition of arts that it obtained from the Pretoria Art School alongside a tradition of enterprise management that it got from the commercial school. The school thus has six study fields including art, music, dance, drama alongside enterprise management and hospitality studies.

== Subjects offered ==
=== Grades 8-and 9 ===
==== Compulsory subjects ====
- English HL
- Mathematics
- Social Sciences
- Natural Sciences
- Technology
- Afrikaans FAL
- Life Orientation
- Economic and Management Sciences
- Creative Arts

==== Main Focus Area Subjects ====
One of the following - All focus areas and acceptance at the school is subject to Auditions. Auditions must be passed.

- Dramatic Arts
- Visual Arts
- Music
- Enterprise Management (Accounting as main subject)
- Hospitality
- Dance Studies (Ballet, Jazz & Spanish)

=== Grades 10 to 12 ===
==== Compulsory subjects ====
- English HL
- Afrikaans FAL
- Life Orientation
- Mathematics OR Mathematical Literacy

One of the following is also compulsory

- Accounting
- Dance Studies
- Design
- Dramatic Arts
- Hospitality Studies
- Music
- Visual Arts

==== Optional subjects ====
- Physical Sciences
- Computer Applications Technology
- Information Technology
- Economics
- Geography
- Business Studies
- Life Sciences (Biology)
- Tourism
- History

== Notable Alumnae ==
- Bahumi Mhlongo - Actress & influencer
- Dorrianne Mahlangu - Actress
- Hanna Grobler - Actress
- Sthandile Nkosi - Actress
- Vel Bodiba - Actress
- Zetske van Pletzen - Actress
