= Vhulaudzi Secondary School =

Location
- P.O.Box 639 Makhado; Vhulaudzi Village; Polokwane; Makhado, Limpopo 0926

Information
- Type: Public
- Motto: Only the best
- Established: 1975
- Principal: Mukondeleli Makwarela
- Grades: 8-12
- Enrollment: 780 students
- Nickname: V.S.S.
- Website: vhulaudzisecondaryschool.co.za

Vhulaudzi Secondary School is a school in Vhulaudzi, Limpopo, South Africa (near Louis Trichardt) covering grades eight through twelve. The school was found in 1975 and was first named Mutshedzi Secondary School, the school and the district agreed to change the school to Vhulaudzi Secondary School in 1982.

== Clubs and activities ==
- Arts and Culture
- Athletics
- Netball
- Soccer
- Volleyball

== Notable alumni ==
- Shirley Machaba, first black female chief executive officer of PwC Southern Africa
