= Al Falaah College =

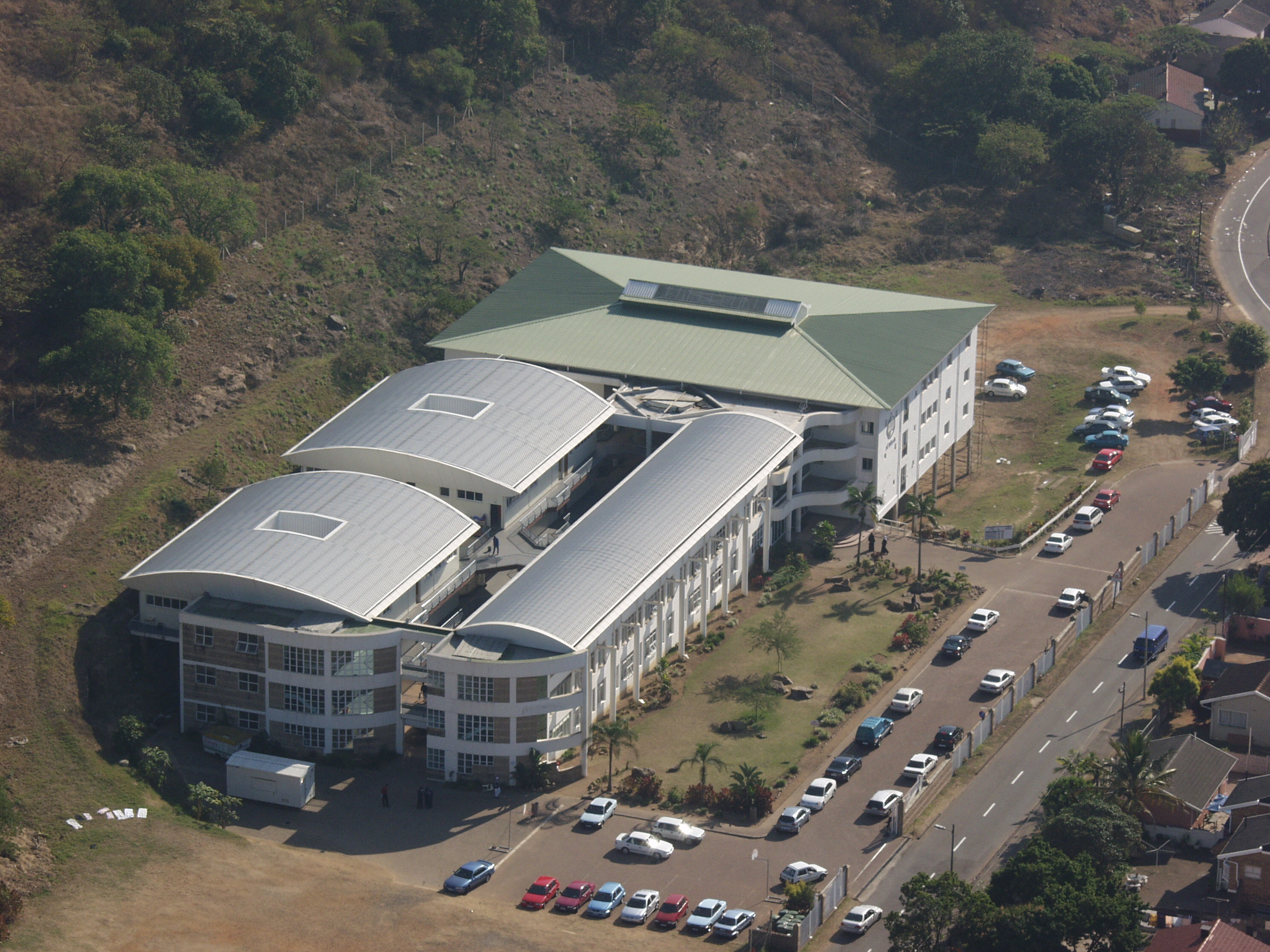

Location
- 99 Lotus Road; Springfield; Durban, KwaZulu-Natal, 4091; South Africa
- Coordinates: 29°49′12″S 30°59′54″E

Information
- Religious affiliation: Islam
- Established: 1985
- Authority: Board of Governors of Al Falaah College
- Principal: Talha Ismail
- Grades: 00 – 12
- Enrolment: 1200
- Colours: Blue and White
- Exam Board: National Senior Certificate
- Website: www.alfalaah.org.za

Al Falaah College is an independent Islamic school situated in the coastal city of Durban, in KwaZulu-Natal, South Africa.

== History ==
In 1985, Ahmedia School opened its doors in Bellair Road, Cato Manor, Durban. The school marked the establishment of the first Islamically-based independent school in Durban, South Africa.

The school ran for the first year with a student population of 74. The first set of matriculants, a total of 21, graduated from what was then known as Lockhat Islamia College in 1991. The school was housed in Cato Manor for 12 years.

With the growth of the college, in 1998, under the name of Lockhat Islamia College, the high school moved to Umbilo Road, Durban while the primary school remained in Cato Manor, Durban. This move was a temporary move due to the construction of the new campus. In 1999 the college was re-located to its present campus in Lotus Road, Springfield, Durban, KwaZulu-Natal.

== Al Falaah College today ==
The school enrolment sits over 1000 students. The college caters for both male and female students from Grade R – 12. The intermediate and Further Education and Training (FET) phase have separate classes for male and female students. AFC participates in the National Curriculum Examinations.

== CAPS Curriculum ==
Al Falaah College offers the following CAPS subjects:

- English Home Language
- Afrikaans First Additional Language
- Mathematics
- Mathematical Literacy
- Physical Sciences
- Business Studies
- Life Sciences
- Accounting
- Engineering, Graphics & Design
- Geography
- Life Orientation

== Islamic curriculum ==
In addition to the National Curriculum the following studies are integrated into the Al Falaah curriculum:

- Islamic Studies (Theory)
- Islamic Studies (Oral)
- Arabic
- Hifz – Memorization of the Qur'an (Optional)

== Academics ==
In the Grade 12 examination each year Al Falaah College achieves an average of over two distinctions per student. The college was also voted among the top 18 independent schools in South Africa by The Sunday Times. It was recognised as by the Department of Education to be amongst the top 200 maths and science schools in the country.

Matric Examination Results	2003	2004	2005	2006	2007	2008	2009	2010	2011	2012	2013	2014	2015	2016
Number of candidates	55	45	49	59	51	53	54	73	71	53	86	79		71
Number of failures	0	0	0	0	0	0	0	0	0	0	0	0	0	0
University endorsement (%)	97	100	100	100	100	98	96	99	100	98	94	99	100	100
A aggregates (%)	31	33	38	50	47	32			30	46	37	25	43	49
A-B aggregates (%)	86	90	95	100	100	90.5							88	90
Subject distinctions	94	81	98	142	128	159	126	175	242	197	263	232	225	291
Number in top 50 (KZN)	0	0	0	0	0	0	1	0	1	0	0	0	0	1

== Sports ==
- Soccer
- Cricket
- Swimming (to be implemented)
- Netball
- Mini-cricket
- Indoor soccer
- Volleyball
- Archery
- Athletics
- Tennis
- Basketball

== Memberships ==
- Association of Muslim Schools

== Headmasters ==
=== Primary school ===
- T Seymore (1985–1988)
- OF Ameen (1989–2012)
- Z Muhammad (2013–present)

=== High school ===
- EH Khamissa
- MS Karodia
- Y Salot
- Z Ahmed (Current Principal)
- A Sujee (Ex-Deputy Principal)
