= Johannesburg Muslim School =

Coordinates: 26°12′6.90″S 28°1′23.10″E

- Johannesburg, Gauteng; South Africa

Information
- Type: Private school
- Established: 1989
- Principal: ----------------
- Enrollment: 1 000

Johannesburg Muslim School (JMS) is a partly private school situated in crosby, Johannesburg, South Africa. The school combines secular and Islamic education in its curriculum and has a separate preschool located in Mayfair that caters for Nursery, and Grade R pupils. The main school section, located in crosby, caters for grades 1-12. This school is situated on Corner Foyle and Jarman Streets, Crosby, Johannesburg.

The Mission Statement of the school is "to provide young children with the holistic concept of knowledge with the holy Quran and the Sunnah as the source of guidance". The core ideology adopted is "Every child in Jannah".

JMS is run by the Johannesburg Muslim School Association (Incorporated under Section 21 of the Companies Act, 1973, South Africa). The members of the association administer the school on a voluntary basis. Being a Section 21 company, the association is incorporated as a non-profit. All funding received as fees from learners is used entirely for the objectives of the school.

Johannesburg Muslim School often ranks in the top 20 schools in the Gauteng province and is rated in the top 5 feeder schools from previously disadvantaged communities by the University of the Witwatersrand.

== History ==
Plans for a Muslim school in the Johannesburg area were conceived during 1989. The Johannesburg Muslim School had its humble beginnings in January 1990. From its premises on 10th Avenue, Mayfair, Johannesburg, the Johannesburg Muslim School (JMS) began with 115 learners. Tuition was first offered from Class 1 to Standard 2 (Grades 1 to 4). The Board of Management had resolved that the establishment of the school will take place in several stages. In 1991, tuition was extended to standard 3 (Grade 5) level and a pre-school with nursery classes was also introduced. The student enrolment increased to 189 in 1991. Tuition was subsequently offered at higher levels over the years that followed. As of 1997, the school offers classes from Nursery up to Matric (Grade 12) and the student enrollment in 2010 was 1200 students.

The school outgrew its premises on 10th Avenue, Mayfair, and in 1992 moved to the old Bree Street School complex in Fordsburg. This complex was completely revamped to provide students with better facilities. Again, as a result of natural growth, the premises at the Bree Street School complex became inadequate. JMS then leased the old Johannesburg Secondary School premises in Fordsburg from the Department of Public Works.

During the COVID pandemic in 2020, JMS ran a successful online school that ensured that learners did not miss a single day of school during the year. In January 2021, JMS moved to a new premises in Crosby with sprawling fields, over 40 classrooms, a capacity of 1200 learners and state of the art labs and facilities.

== Membership ==
- Association of Muslim Schools (SA)
