= Siphephele High School =

South African high school

Siphephele High School in a public state secondary school in the A-section of Folweni in the province of KwaZulu-Natal, South Africa. It is located south west of Durban.
