= Mandisa Mfeka =

South African pilot

Mandisa Mfeka is a South African pilot. She is known to be the first black female combat pilot in South Africa.

Mfeka was born in Ntuzuma in KwaZulu-Natal. She had her secondary education at Queensburgh Girls’ High School. In 2008, she joined the South African Air Force and was enrolled at Central Flying School in Langebaan, Western Cape. She earned her wings in 2011. During President Cyril Ramaphosa’s inauguration, she together with other female pilots, took to the skies in a Hawks formation air display. She is known to have flown one of the five SA Airforce Hawk Mk 120 aircraft over Loftus Versveld Stadium in Pretoria during the president's inauguration.
