= Segopotje Senior Secondary School =

Segopotje Senior Secondary School is a secondary school situated in Mashite, Ga Mphahlele, Limpopo Province, South Africa. The School started in 1992 as a junior secondary school as it only had Grade 8 up to 10. It became Segopotje Senior Secondary in 1997 and it is currently one of Limpopo Province's most successful secondary schools.
