= Homevale High School =

School in Northern Cape, South Africa

Coordinates: 28.69657°S 24.73330°E

Information
- Enrollment: c.1000

Homevale High School is situated in Kimberley, Northern Cape, South Africa, in a location known as extension. The school is multi-racial and it is a government school. The school has close to 1000 learners. The school offers many different types of sports, such as volleyball, netball, rugby, soccer, and hockey.
