= Queensburgh Girls' High School =

Queensburgh Girls' High School is an all-girls high school located on Main Road, Queensburgh, KwaZulu-Natal, in South Africa.

The school was established on 28 January 1969 when it split off from the co-educational Queensburgh High School.

== Notable alumnae ==
- Mandisa Mfeka - first South African female fighter pilot
- Shekhinah - singer/songwriter
