= Orient Islamic School =

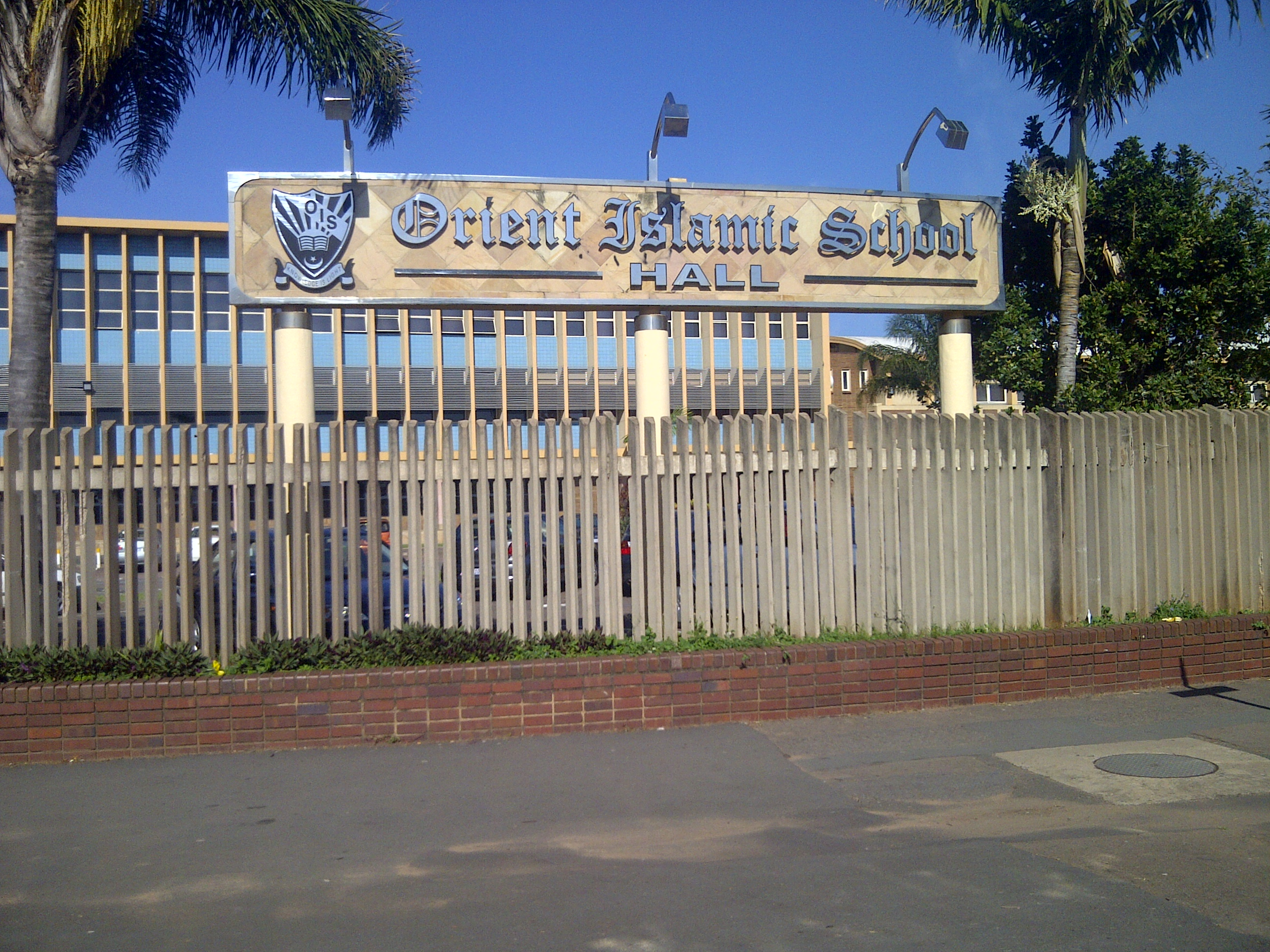
- Durban, Kwa-ZuluNatal; South Africa

Information
- Other names: Orient, Orient School or O.I.S.
- Type: Private school
- Motto: Knowledge is Light
- Established: 1959
- Locale: Urban
- Exam board: NSC
- Grades: RR–12
- Enrollment: 1075
- Colors: White, Navy Blue and Gold
- Website: www.orientschool.co.za

Orient Islamic School is an independent Muslim school situated in Greyville, Durban, South Africa.

Orient School is part of the Orient Islamic Educational Institute that was established in 1938. The school was established in 1959 as a state-aided school. In 1998, the school became an independent school.

Orient Islamic School, commonly known as Orient or O.I.S., is an independent Islamic school in Durban, KwaZulu‑Natal, South Africa. Founded in 1959 by the Orient Islamic Educational Institute (est. 1938), it serves approximately 1,075 learners from Grade RR to Grade 12, offering a dual curriculum under the South African CAPS framework.

== History ==
Land for the current campus at Greyville was acquired in 1955 following decades of community efforts against apartheid-era barriers. Originally state-aided, Orient gained full independent status in 1998 after successfully asserting legal autonomy in the KwaZulu‑Natal High Court in 1996.

== Academic Program ==
The school follows the national Curriculum and Assessment Policy Statement (CAPS) and prepares learners for the National Senior Certificate exams. Orient consistently attains a pass rate of 99.5%, with 94% exemption passes among matriculants who regularly rank among the top performers in KwaZulu‑Natal.

== Islamic Education ==
Orient delivers a full Islamic curriculum which includes Qur’an studies, Hifdh, Tajweed, Arabic, Fiqh, Aqeedah, and Seerah alongside daily Salah,

== Facilities ==
- Two Apple computer labs and e-learning-equipped classrooms
- Fully equipped Engineering & Graphics Design (EGD) Lab
- Life Sciences Lab
- Physical Science Lab
- Media Centre and school library
- Musallah (prayer hall) and Hifdh rooms
- Astroturf sports field, basketball/netball courts, Foundation Phase playground
- School hall, tuck shop, counselling and nurse facilities

== Extracurricular Activities ==
The school offers:

- STEM enrichment: math/science Olympiads, coding, robotics (Maker & Digi labs)
- Islamic competitions: Qur’an recitation, quizzes
- Sports: soccer, cricket, netball, volleyball, swimming; participates in AMS‑SA tournaments
- Public speaking, debating, community outreach initiatives

== Governance ==
Governed by the Orient Islamic Educational Institute, the school is accredited by Umalusi, registered with the provincial Department of Education, and is a member of the Association of Muslim Schools – South Africa.

== See also ==
- Islam in South Africa
- Education in South Africa
- Association of Muslim Schools (SA)

== Gallery ==
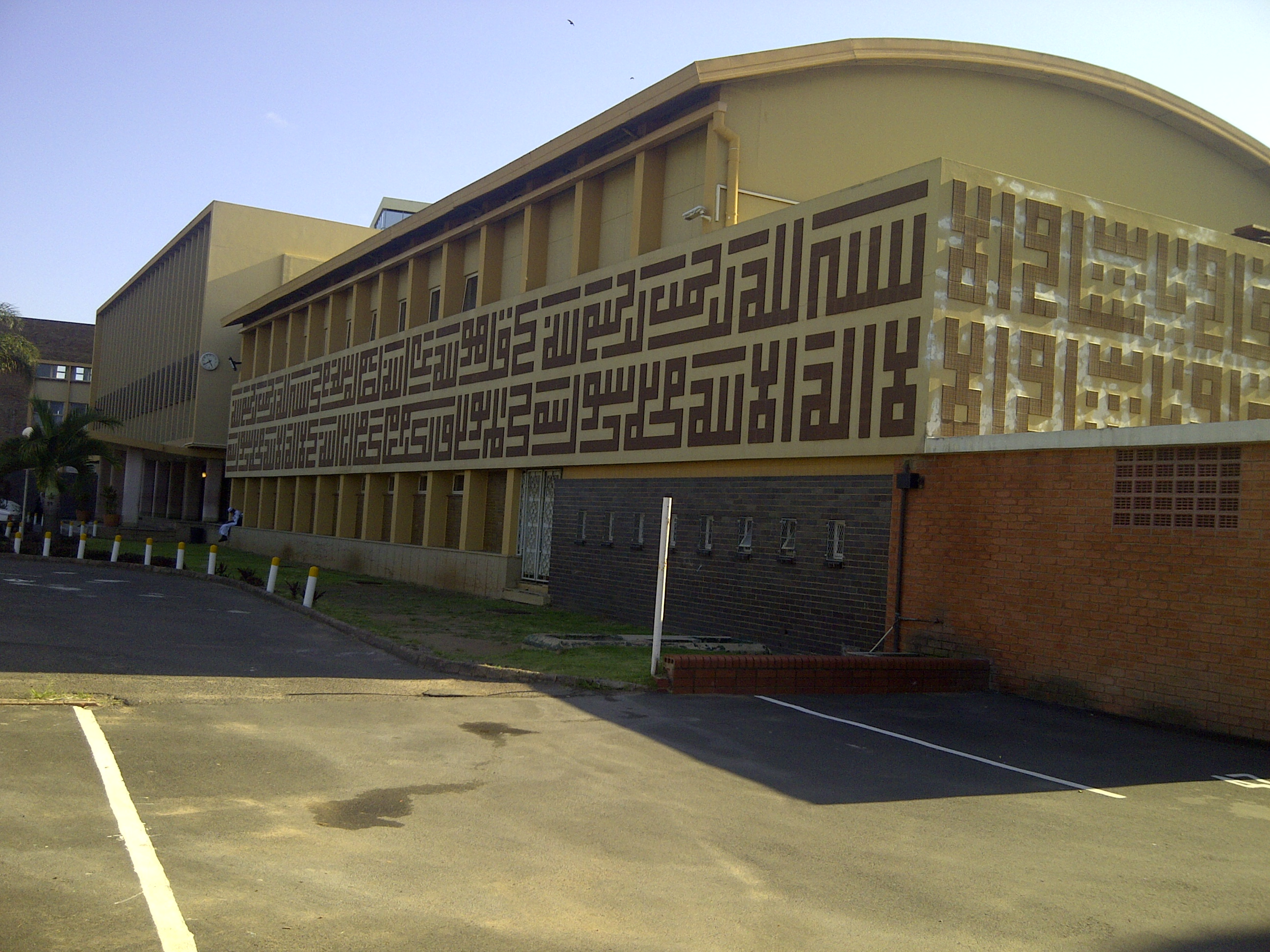
Orient Islamic School in 2014

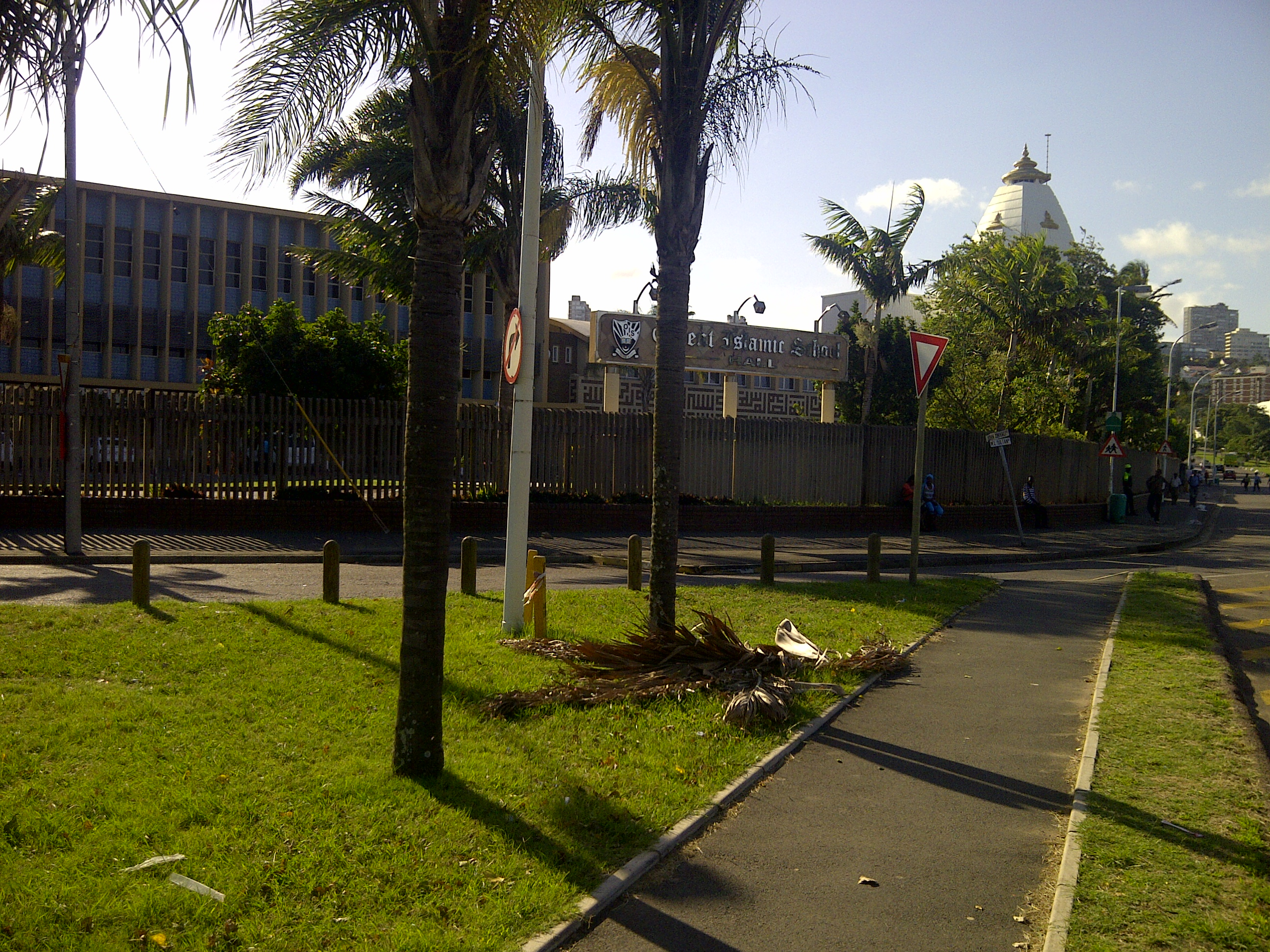
Orient Islamic School from Out Side in 2014

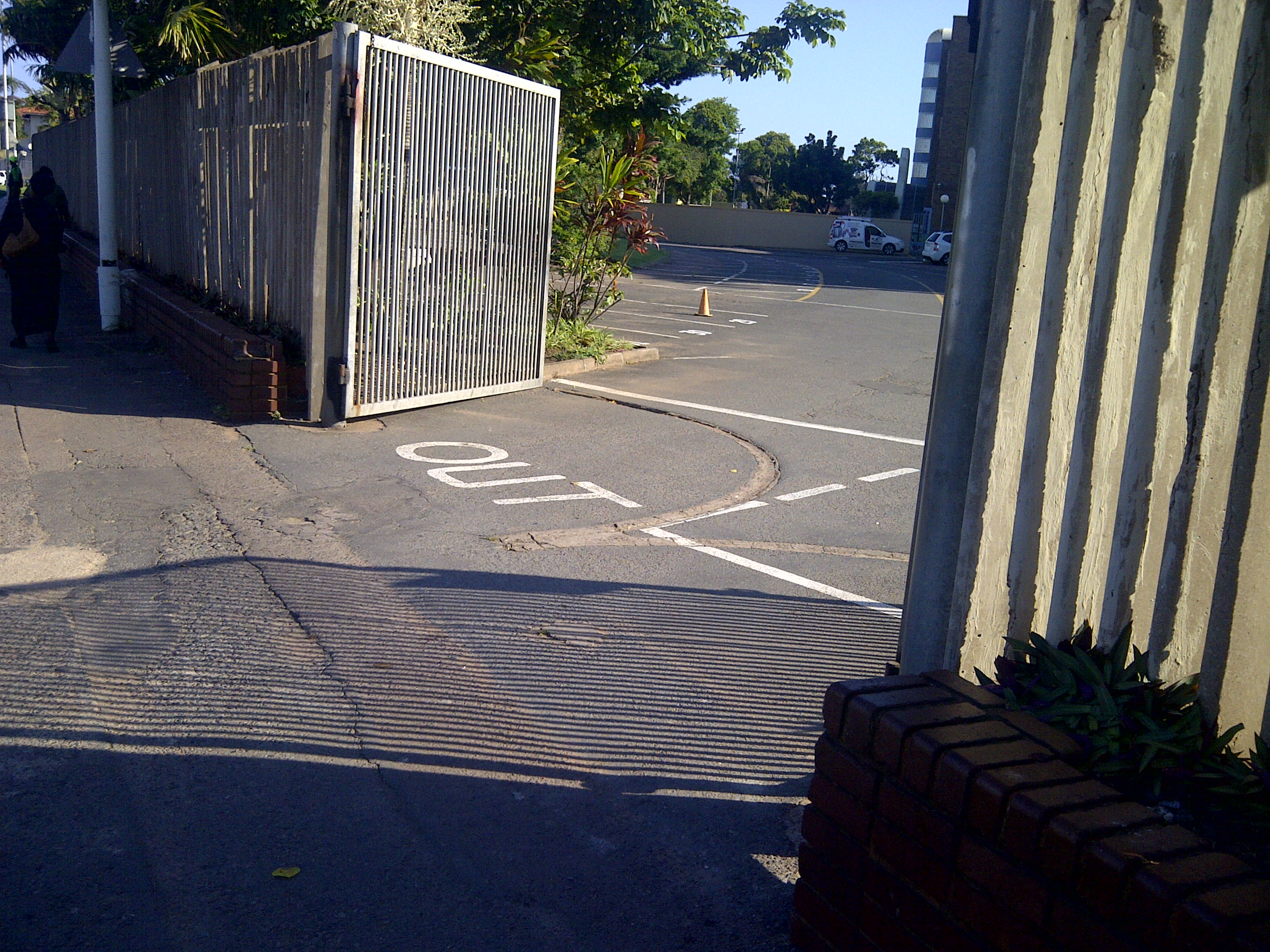
Orient Islamic School Entrance / Exit on John Zikhali Road in 2014

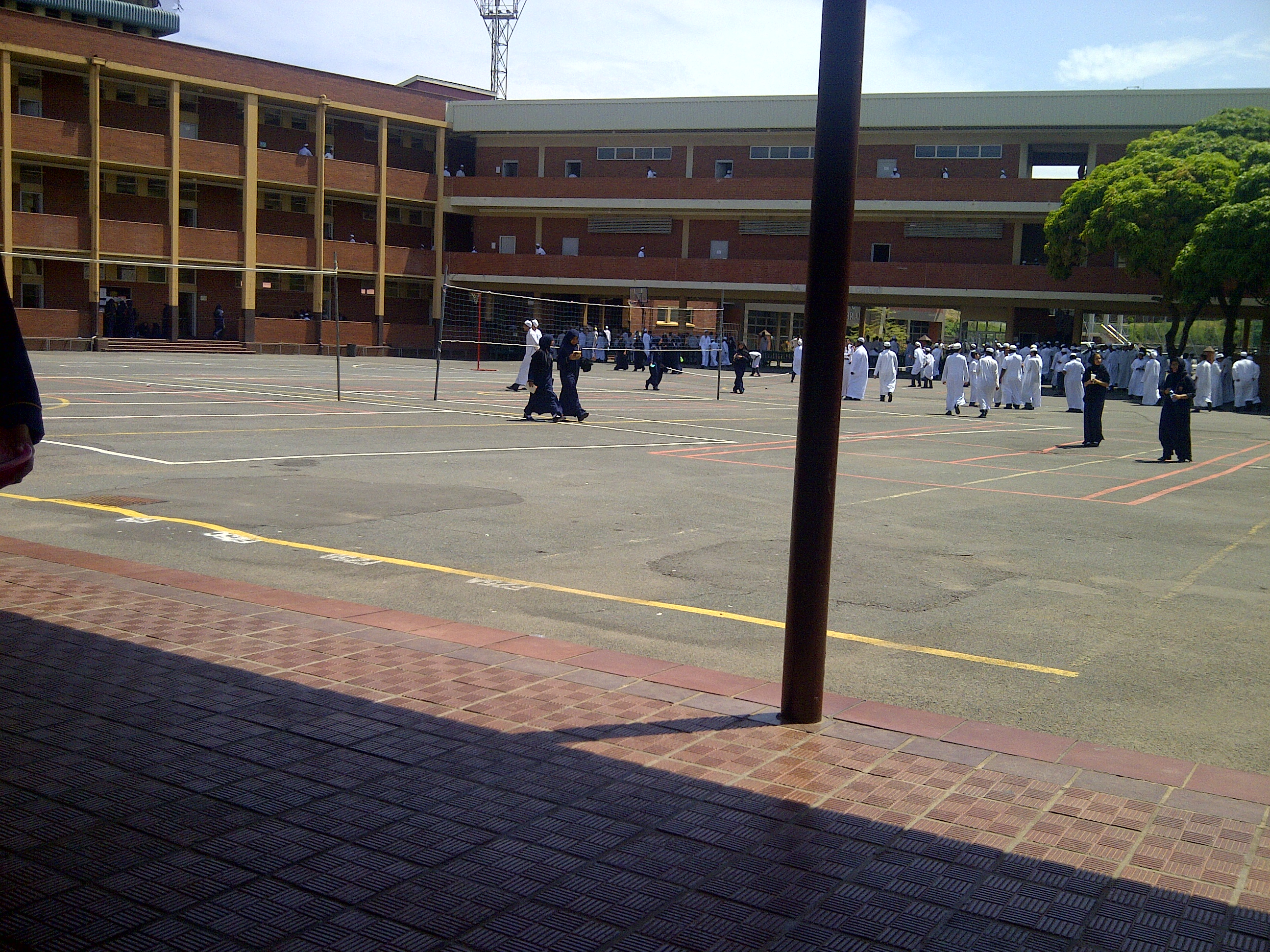
Orient Islamic School Playground in 2014
