= Phiri Kolobe High =

High school in vicinity of Mankweng

Phiri Kolobe High is a high school in Ga-Dikgale, near Mankweng, South Africa.

Notable alumni include politician Solly Malatsi, who in 2014 became one of the youngest members of parliament. The school has a debate team.
