= Ntsonkotha Senior Secondary School =

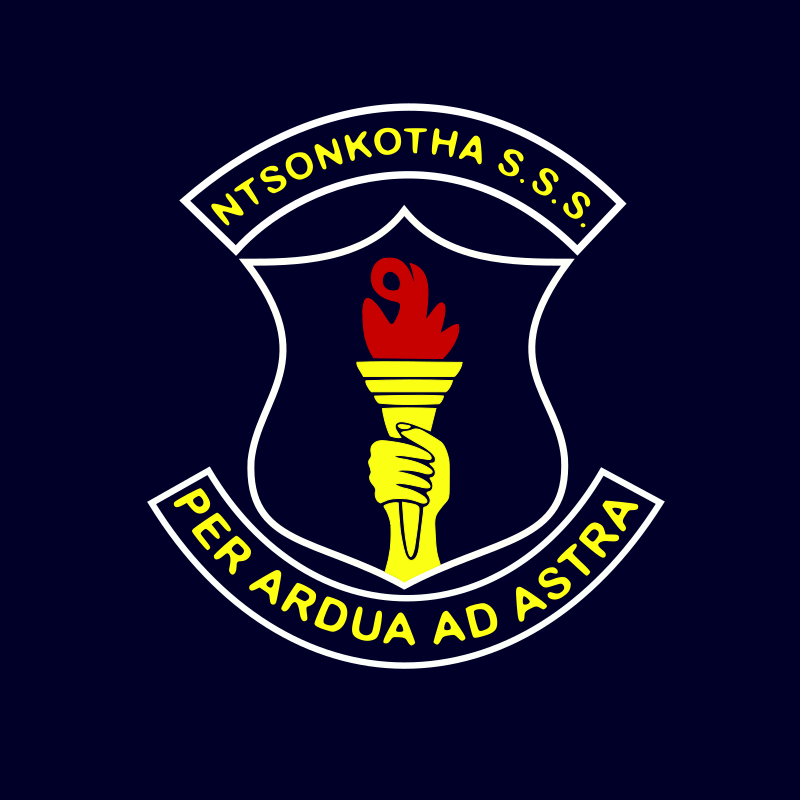
- Cacadu, Eastern Cape; South Africa

Information
- School type: Public & Boarding
- Motto: Per Ardua Ad Astra (Through Diversity to the Stars)
- Established: 1969; 57 years ago
- Principal: Mrs Siyeka-Silosini
- Grades: 8-12
- Colours: Navy , White , Yellow , Red

Ntsonkotha Senior Secondary School is a coeducational, secondary boarding school in Agnes, Eastern Cape, South Africa

== History ==
Ntsonkotha Senior Secondary School was officially opened in May 1969. The school is situated at Agnes Rest Administrative Area, Lady Frere, Eastern Cape, South Africa.

The school was built with the waters coming down Ntsonkotha stream hence the name. Ntsonkotha is a boarding school. It is one of three boarding schools in the area. It is said that the land on which Ntsonkotha is situated on was donated by the Nomtshongwana clan. The community contributed in the building of the school with Mr Noholoza championing the cause.

The motto of the school is "Per adua ad astra" it means through adversity to the stars.

Ntsonkotha has been one of the best performing high schools in the Lady Frere district.
