= Dinokana =

- Location within North West (South African province) Location within South Africa
- Coordinates: 25.447°S 25.863°E
- Country: South Africa
- Province: North West
- District: Ngaka Modiri Molema
- Municipality: Ramotshere Moiloa

Area
  - Total: 39.34 km^{2} (15.19 sq mi)

Population (2011)
  - Total: 26,409
  - Density: 671.3/km^{2} (1,739/sq mi)

Racial makeup (2011)
  - Black African: 99.4%
  - Coloured: 0.2%
  - Indian/Asian: 0.2%
  - White: 0.1%
  - Other: 0.1%

First languages (2011)
  - Tswana: 92.4%
  - English: 2.6%
  - Zulu: 1.3%
  - S. Ndebele: 1.2%
  - Other: 2.4%
- Time zone: UTC+2 (SAST)
- Postal code (street): 2868
- PO box: 2868
- Area code: 018

Dinokana is a town on the N4 road in Ngaka Modiri Molema District Municipality in the North West province of South Africa.

== Early settlement ==
The area became the main town of the Bahurutshe in 1849, when Kgosi Moiloa I settled it with about 1,500 people, who had been displaced following the Difaqane war. Moiloa was accompanied by the Reverend Walter Inglis of the London Missionary Society.

In 1875, a succession dispute in the aftermath of Moiloa's death led to the displacement of many BaHurutshe, and nearly half of the population moved to Gopane.

== Anti-apartheid history ==
Dinokana was the centre of the Bahurutshe resistance of the 1950s. Kgosi Abram Ramotshere Moiloa was banished by the Apartheid Government in 1957 after he refused to enforce the carrying of passbooks by Hurutshe women as obliged by apartheid law. The women of Dinokana had largely refused to carry the passbooks, and Kgosi Moiloa had supported their decision. At the first meeting held by the native commissioner, 1000 women gathered but only 70 passbooks were taken out, Kgosi Moiloa was deposed a week later. Better known as the Zeerust uprising or the Hurutshe revolt, a popular uprising engulfed Lehurutshe in reaction to the punitive actions of the apartheid state, led particularly by the women of Lehurutse.

== Bophuthatswana ==
In the 1980s, while the town was part of Bophuthatswana, a number of agricultural schemes were started close to Dinokana, and the town of Lehurutshe was built about 10 km (6.2 mi) away to resettle some of the villagers. Dinokana has primary schools and high schools.
