= Pholela High School =

Location
- Bulwer, KwaZulu-Natal; South Africa; 29°49′0″S 29°46′15″E

Information
- Other names: Pholela Public, Pholela institution, PI
- Type: Public, former boarding school
- Motto: In hoc signo vinces
- Established: 1921
- Locale: Pholela, Bulwer, near the Drakesburg
- Principal: Mr Sikhakhane
- Grades: Grades 8-12
- Colors: Navy, gold
- School fees: None

Pholela High School, otherwise known as Pholela Institute or Pholela Public and at times called P.I. is a school in Bulwer, KwaZulu-Natal. It used to be a boarding school run as an institution until it was made a public school in the year 2000.

== History ==
Pholela High School is a school previously run by the Presbyterian Church. The school buildings were built in the old Dutch style, on the main road in Bulwer, directly facing the Amahwaqa Mountain.

The school was well known before the 2000s as one of the few black schools that consistently produced good matric results. The government took over the school due to some issues in 1999. After this results declined, leading eventually to the closure of the boarding facility in 2008.

The school also has a large chapel at the centre as evidence of the church and religious influences.There was a compulsory church service every Sunday and there were prayers held every night organised by the SCM (Student Christian Movement) and occasionally, this organisation organised late night Sunday services that gave the students much entertainment through different performances.

Further classrooms were built including a Computer Room. On the sports front, provincial and, on occasion, national honours, have been earned in for example volleyball, soccer and netball. The school has a soccer/athletics field, a tennis court, volleyball court, a basketball field and 2 netball fields scattered over the large school premises.

=== Principals ===
- Rev J Khonyane
- Mr Petzer
- Mr Grantham 1996–1998
- Mr M.D. Hlongwane (1998–2005)
- Mr Myburgh (1998)
- Mrs Steer (1999)
- Mr Mbanjwa (2005–2007)
- Mr M.N. Skhakhane (2005-current)

=== Superintendents ===
- Mr Mlotshwa
- Mr Maphosa

== The school today ==
The school is run by the KwaZulu-Natal Department of Education and a school governing body.

About 685 students, mostly from the local areas of Bulwer, attend the school. Previously, the school attracted students from all over the country from as far afield as the Cape, Gauteng, etc. It is a Zulu-medium school and offers English as second languages (or first additional languages in the new FET curriculum). The school consists of the black population from the local areas.

== Facilities ==
Sports offered include soccer (football), netball, athletics, volleyball, tennis and basketball represented by both boys and girls teams. Cultural activities, including chess, debating, team-speaking, choir, poetry and traditional are offered.
