= Phehello High School =

School in South Africa

Phehello High School is a high school located in Kutlwanong, Free State, South Africa. The school was founded in 1970.

The Principal was Mr Masheane till 2019.

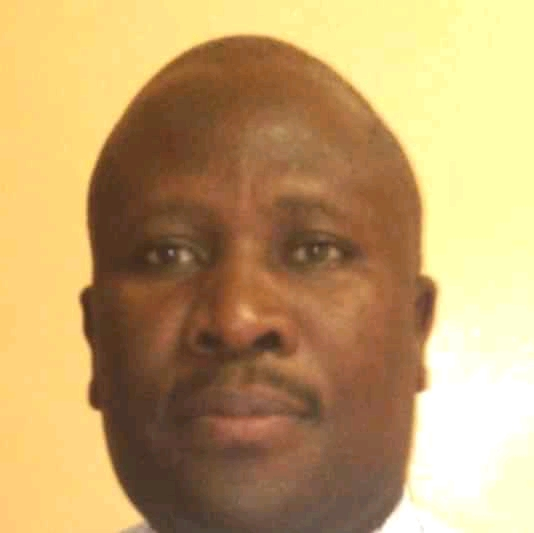
Former Principal

Current Principal is Mr Molutsi.

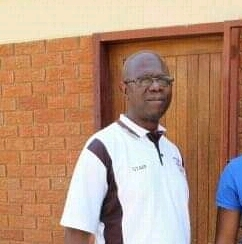
Phehello High School Principal

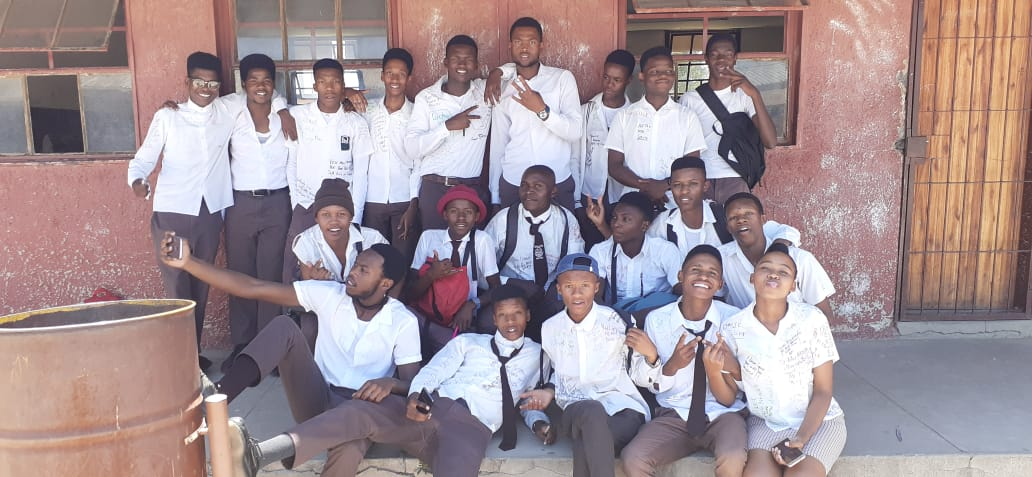
Class of 2019

Phehello High School's previous year pupils.

== History ==
In the late sixties, Kutlwanong Township had four primary Schools, Icoseng Thusanong, Marobe and Impucuko. When learners passed STD 6 with a second class, to further their studies they either had to go to Lebogang High School in Thabong (Welkom) or to a boarding school elsewhere.

There was a dire need for a secondary school in Kutlwanong. Meeting after meeting was held to address this issue, until a delegation of concerned parents and school committee members approached the Circuit Inspector's Office to request a secondary school. There were neither physical nor human resources available, however, there were learners who could not continue with their high school education because of financial constraints or because they had passed with a "Third class." In 1970 this group of learners was sent to Lebogang High School to start a high school and because of the perseverance of the parents the school was named Phehello.

== Renovations ==
A proper Library, Laboratory House Craft Center and more and better class rooms were added to the original building. Waterborne toilets and electricity were installed in the school. A farewell function for standard 10 learners was done for the first time Graduates of different faculties in their regalia came to motivate the learners.

The 10 original class rooms were tiled and ceiling were installed more toilets added.

A new admin block (current) a tennis court and Basketball were added to the school The Square was paved.

== Curriculum ==
=== 1988–1996 ===
Typing as a subject was introduced to the curriculum of the school

A Platoon System was introduced, which gravely affected the performance of both teachers and learners alike.

=== 1997–2001 ===
A New system of appointing staff came about OBE a new curriculum was introduced into High Schools for the first time Learners from primary schools knew better than their secondary school educators

Educators had to adjust as fast as possible, teacher organizations had a say in the running of the school. There was resistance to class visitations, full blown time offs, Many workshops were attended by the educators to catch up with the new curriculum Platoon System continued learning and teaching deteriorated at an alarming rate Matriculation results dropped terribly 18% pass was the best the school could produce The principal and the SMT had to account before the MEC for education.

In 1998, there was reconstruction and development teaching and learning improved advice, recommendations, counseling given by the SMD, LF'S was heeded. In the consecutive years the result improved from 72% to 80%.

2012-Current

The school is currently using the Curriculum Assessment Policy Statements (CAPS) since of 2012.
