= Westville Senior Secondary High School =

School in Port Elizabeth, South Africa

Coordinates: 33.8862°S 25.5151°E

Westville Senior Secondary is a public high school in Port Elizabeth, South Africa, catering for both English and Afrikaans speaking students from grade 8 - 12.

== Subjects offered ==
=== Grades 8–9 ===
All Subjects are compulsory for Grade 8–9.

- English home Language
- Afrikaans ( Additional Language)
- Mathematics
- Social Sciences(SS) - which includes History & Geography
- Natural Sciences( NS) which includes Science and Biology and life sciences
- Economic and Management Science( EMS) - Accounting & Business Economics
- Life Orientation

(LO)

- Arts and Culture (A&C)
- Technology ( a wide variety of information and methods of how things work)

=== Grades 10–12 ===
A pupil must do 7 subjects 4 compulsory subjects from Group A (including two languages) and three from Group B

=== Group A ===
(All compulsory)

- English (Home Language)
- Afrikaans or Xhosa (Additional language)
- Life Orientation
- Maths or Maths Literacy

=== Group B ===
(Must do 3 of these )

History, Geography, Life sciences (Biology), Physical Science, Accounting, Business Studies, Tourism, Computer Applications Technology (CAT-Computyping )
