= Oakhurst Primary School =

Oakhurst Girls' Primary School

Location
- Rondebosch, Cape Town; South Africa; 33°58′0″S 18°28′40″E

Information
- Type: All Girls State School
- Motto: nil nisi optimum nothing but the best
- Established: 1906
- Principal: Mrs de la Bat
- Grades: R - 7
- Colors: Green, white and navy blue
- Website: www.oakhurst.org.za

Oakhurst Primary School is situated in Oakhurst Avenue, Rondebosch, Cape Town, South Africa. In 2006 the school celebrated its 100th anniversary.

== Academics ==
Oakhurst is a small school with one class per grade and encourages one-on-one teaching with the idea that smaller classes encourage better results.

== History ==
Oakhurst was opened on 8 October 1906 as the Camp Ground School for Girls under the leadership of Mrs M. Garcia. It became an independent branch of Rustenburg School for Girls. It changed its name to Oakhurst Primary School in 1927 after one of the old houses on the Canigou Estate. Until 1930, boys too were admitted to the kindergarten grades.

=== Headmistresses ===
- Mrs Mabel Garcia (1906-1921)
- Miss Christine Chandler (1920-1935)
- Miss Esmé Powis (1936-1939)
- Miss L. de Smidt (1940-1954)
- Miss Elizabeth Haenni (1955-1982)
- Miss Joan McKee (1982-1997)
- Ms Anneline Lourens (1997-2006)
- Mrs Jenny Van Velden (2007–2015)
- Mrs Lorette de la Bat (2016–2023)
- Mrs Gay Potter (2024–Present)

== Houses ==
Oakhurst houses are: Athlone (green), Buxton (red), and Clarendon (blue). They compete in multiple activities like general knowledge, music and all sports like interhouse netball, swimming, waterpolo etc.

== Sport ==
Oakhurst offers summer and winter sports. In summer there is tennis, waterpolo, swimming and running. Winter is netball hockey and cross country. these are all competed between houses and other schools.
