= St. Patrick's College, South Africa =

South African boarding school

Coordinates: 30.53234°S 29.41606°E

St Patrick's College is a co-educational boarding school in Kokstad, founded in 1993 in the heart of East Griqualand, KwaZulu Natal, South Africa. Born from the Holy Cross Convent; St Patrick's College was started by a group of parents.
