= Lenasia Muslim School =

Islamic school in Lenasia, South Africa

Coordinates: 26°21′01″S 27°51′22″E

Lenasia Muslim School is an independent high school in Lenasia, Gauteng, South Africa. It achieved a 100% pass rate in the matriculation exams in the years 2003 to 2009, and in 2010, with a 99% pass rate, was one of the five top performing independent schools in Gauteng. It is situated in Lenasia extension 10.

As of 2017 Lenasia Muslim School's has a new principal. Appa Nazarine Suliman has taken over the role from Mr Rashid Mohammed. Fosters healthy competition with Al Aqsa high school
