= Roxy Ingram =

South African model (born 1982)

- Born: Roxanne Ingram; 11 May 1982 (age 44); Port Elizabeth, South Africa
- Education: Table View High School; Progress College
- Modeling information
- Height: 5 ft 9.5 in (1.77 m)
- Hair color: Dark brown
- Eye color: Blue

Roxy Ingram (born 11 May 1982) is a South African model. She has appeared in the 2003, 2004, and 2005 South African Sports Illustrated swimsuit issues. She has been named number 16 in FHM's coveted 100 Sexiest Women survey in South Africa. In 2004, she was the girlfriend of English R&B singer Craig David.

== Biography ==
She started school at Aston Manor, Kempton Park, before moving to Cape Town where she attended Table View Primary and Table View High School. She matriculated at Progress College in Rondebosch.

Ingram is the youngest of three siblings. Her older sister Samantha and brother Richard both live in Cape Town.

Her magazine covers include Shape, Health & Fitness, SL, SA Sports Illustrated, and FHM Collections.
