= Sasolburg High School =

Public high school in Sasolburg, South Africa

Coordinates: 26°48′33″S 27°48′57″E

Sasolburgh High School

Address
- Taunus Street; Sasolburg, Free State; South Africa

Information
- School type: State school, High School
- Principal: Mr. W. Wessels

Sasolburgh High School is a public high school, serving grades 8 to 12, in the town of Sasolburg, South Africa.

== Firearm incident ==
On 20 September 2013 a 15 year old student brought a firearm to school, which belonged to his grandfather, and began threatening other students. While attempting to intervene, a male teacher was wounded in the right leg after the gun fired by mistake. The student fled but was later found with the firearm in his possession. The teacher was taken to a nearby hospital in a stable condition and underwent surgery at Vanderbijlpark's Mediclinic Emfuleni. The pupil was arrested and psychologically evaluated before appearing in child justice court on 23 September. He was later released to the care of his parents.

== Notable alumni ==
- Johannes Kerkorrel – singer/songwriter
- Mark Pilgrim - Radio DJ, TV personality
