= Michael Mount Waldorf School =

- Michael Mount logo

Location
- 40 Culross Road; Bryanston, Gauteng; South Africa
- Coordinates: 26°02′43″S 28°01′39″E

Information
- Type: Waldorf school, Private School, Preschool, Primary School, High School
- Motto: Nurturing conscious individuals through dynamic education
- Established: 1960
- Locale: Suburban
- Head of School: Mr John William Bester
- Exam board: IEB
- Grades: Grades 0000 – 12
- Gender: Co-ed
- Enrollment: 450
- Colours: Red and grey
- School fees: https://www.michaelmount.co.za/fees-finances/
- Website: https://www.michaelmount.co.za

Michael Mount Waldorf School is one of 18 registered schools in Southern Africa that practice Waldorf education.

== Overview ==
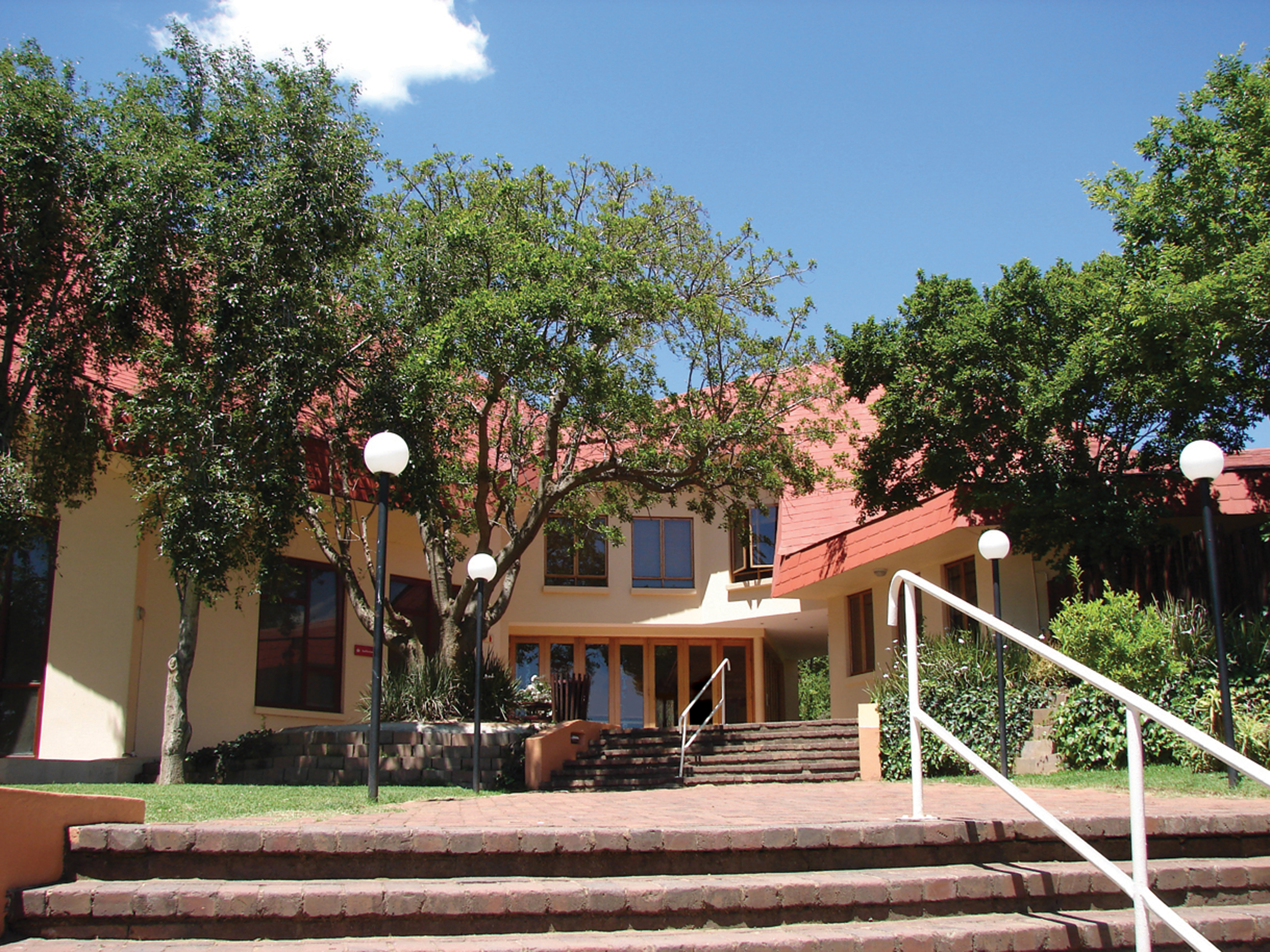
Main entrance to Michael Mount Waldorf School

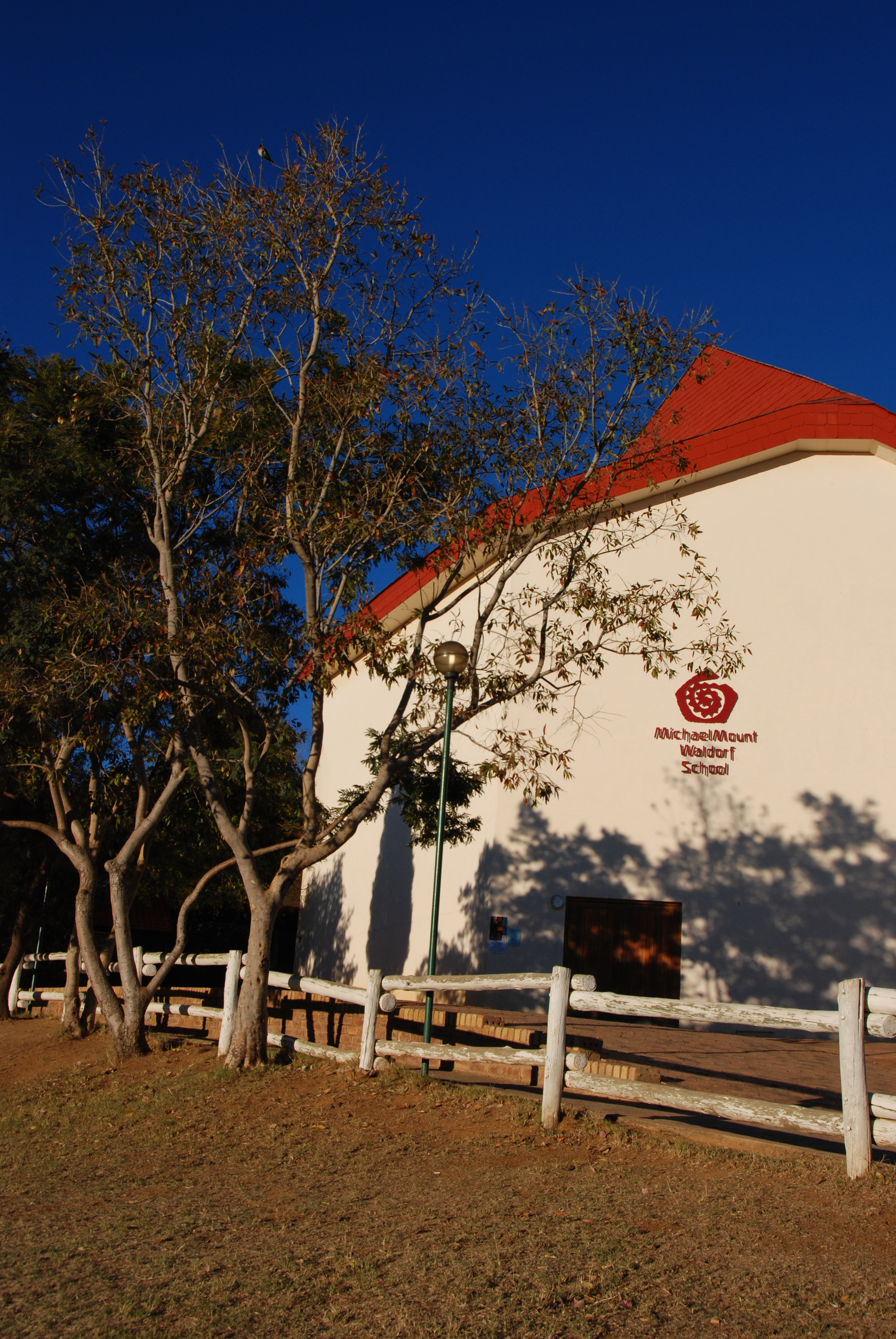
Wintry shadows on the Michael Mount auditorium wall

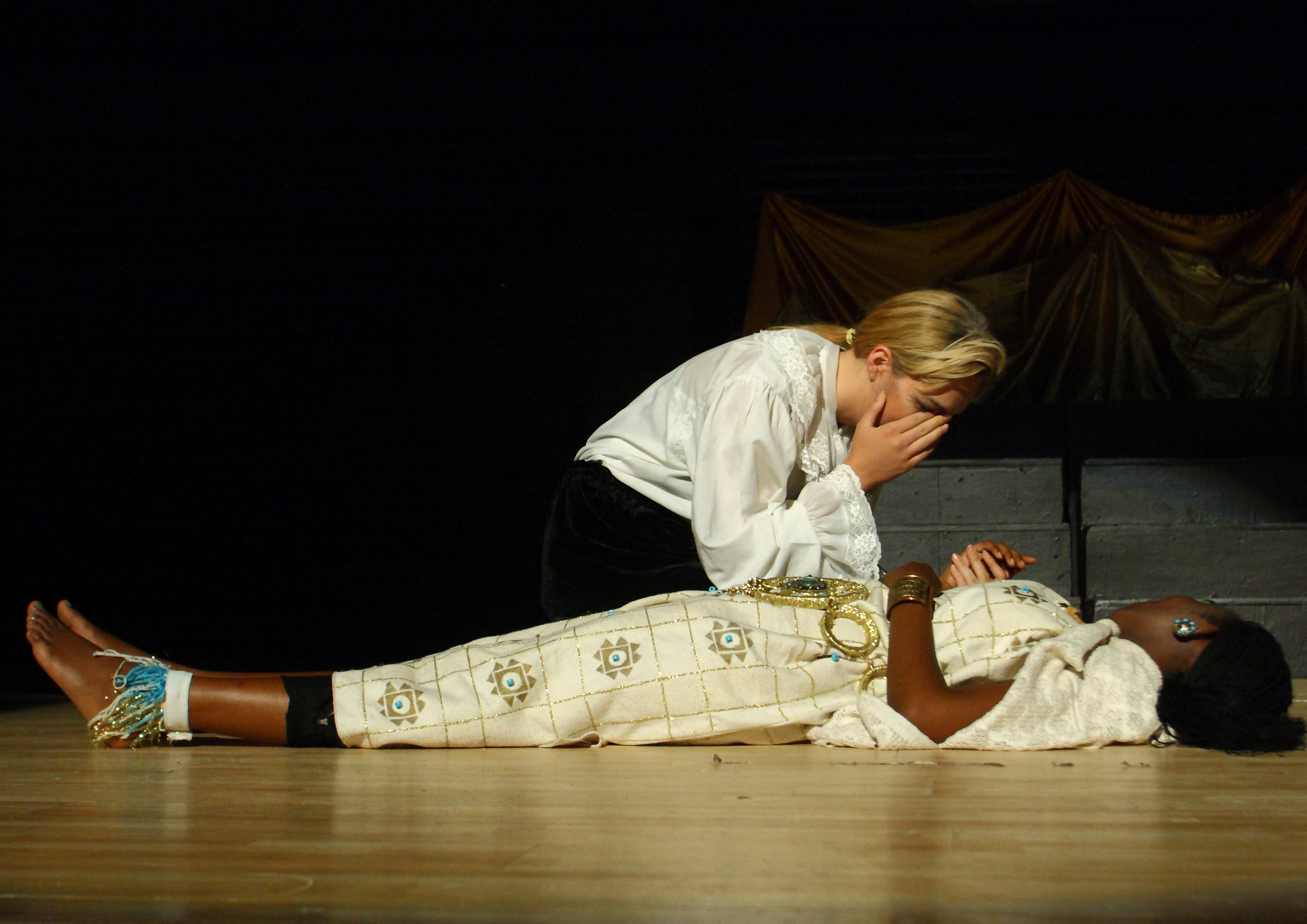
A dramatic performance at Michael Mount

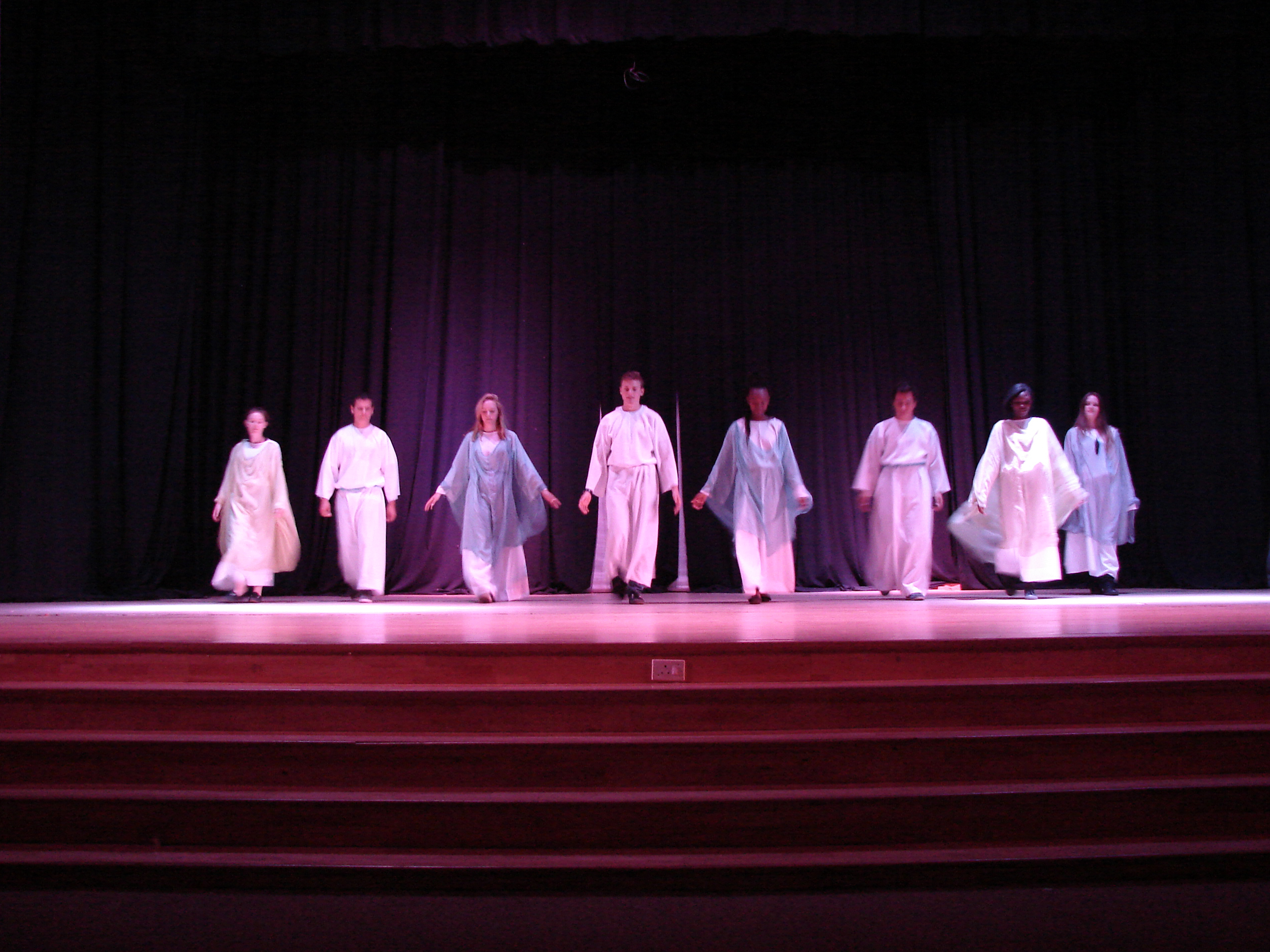
A student Eurythmy performance at Michael Mount Waldorf School

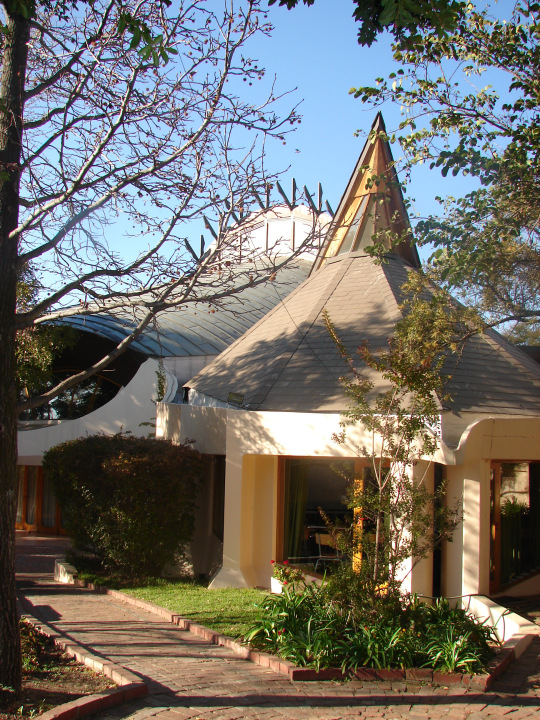
The Steiner Centre for Art, Music and Drama at Michael Mount Waldorf School

- Type of school: Michael Mount Waldorf School is a private, co-educational day school in Bryanston, Johannesburg, South Africa. The school caters for Early Childhood - Baby Care, Play Group and Nursery School (Grade R) - Primary School and High school students – up to Matric (IEB).
- Number of students: 450
- Average class size: 20
- Teacher qualifications: Degree plus ongoing Waldorf teacher training. All teachers undergo appraisals and training.
- Curriculum: The Curriculum of the Waldorf schools is used up to Class 11. It includes all subjects required by the Department of Basic Education.
- Matric: Michael Mount students write the internationally recognised Independent Examinations Board (IEB) National Senior Certificate examinations in Matric.
- Of note: Michael Mount students have maintained a 100% pass rate since the first Matric class wrote finals in 1987.
- Support measures: include Waldorf Extra Lessons, Curative Eurythmy, Support Teaching and Integrated Learning Therapy.
- Sport: Athletics, volleyball, basketball, cricket, soccer, swimming and tennis.
- Extra-curricular activities: These vary from year to year and can include any of the following: climbing, chess, drama, craft, debating, and music.
- After-care: Available for children up to age 10.
- Campus size: 6 hectares.
- Enrolment requirements: Visit the school and attend an Open Day. Pupil to undergo an entrance assessment followed by a teacher-pupil and teacher-family interview.
- Memberships: Michael Mount is a member of:

* Independent Schools Association of Southern Africa (ISASA)
* Southern African Federation of Waldorf Schools
* International Association for Steiner / Waldorf Early Childhood Education.

- Status: The school is registered as a non-profit Organisation (NPO no: 001/314), as well as a Public Benefit Organisation (PBO no: 930003714).

== History ==
- 1960: Michael Mount Waldorf School is founded.
- 1964: The school acquires a 5 hectare campus on Culross Road in Bryanston.
- 1971: The swimming pool is completed.
- 1973: The tennis courts and first three permanent classrooms are completed.
- 1975: The nursery school moves into permanent classrooms.
- 1980: The high school starts.
- 1987: The first group of Michael Mount students write matric.
- 1989: Building of the school's auditorium commences.
- 1990: The aftercare facility is established.
- 1996: The Cyber Centre is completed.
- 2000: Start of the Toddler Group for children aged 2 to 3.
- 2001: Double streaming introduced.
- 2004: Four new classrooms for the high school completed.
- 2006: Building of a new high school block commences in November.
- 2009: The Library is completely transformed. Computerised cataloguing starts.
- 2009: Double streaming reaches the high school.
- 2011: Michael Mount acquires the Steiner Centre from the Anthroposophical Society on campus. It becomes the Steiner Centre for Art, Music and Drama.
- 2015: Two adjacent properties are purchased bringing the total size of the Michael Mount campus to 6 hectares.
- 2016: The Early Childhood Centre is established.
- 2016: Extension of the high school block to incorporate more classrooms.
- 2018: The AdVenture Leadership programme for post-matric students is launched
- 2019: Centenary of Waldorf education celebrated worldwide
- 2020: Michael Mount celebrates its 60th year
- 2021: 40 Culross Road entrance is expanded
- 2023: Green Room extension is added to the Auditorium building thanks to fundraising by community representatives
- 2024: Wellness Centre at 36 Culross opens for business
- 2025: Solar energy system is installed across the school property
