= Pretoria Muslim School =

Islamic school in South Africa

Location
- Laudium; South Africa

Information
- Established: 1990

The Pretoria Muslim School (PMS) also now known as the Tshwane Muslim School is located in Laudium. The school's students at times have scored well in their exams.
