= Table View =

Suburb of Cape Town, in Western Cape, South Africa

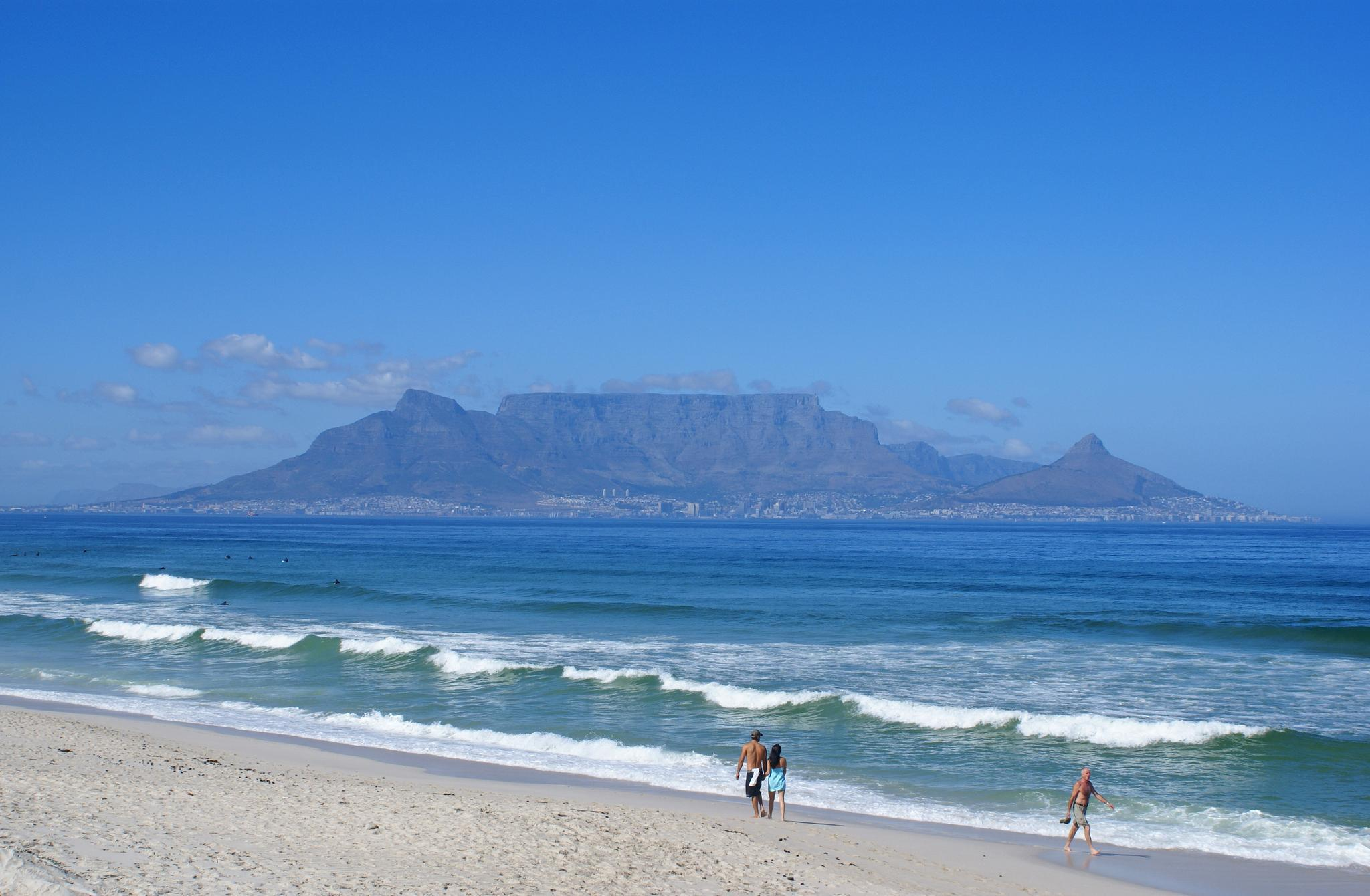
- The view of Table Mountain from nearby Bloubergstrand after which Table View is named.
- Interactive map of Table View
- Coordinates: 33°49′S 18°29′E
- Country: South Africa
- Province: Western Cape
- Municipality: City of Cape Town
- Main Place: Blouberg

Government
  - Councillor: Nora Grose (DA)

Area
  - Total: 6.14 km^{2} (2.37 sq mi)

Population (2011)
  - Total: 17,390
  - Density: 2,830/km^{2} (7,340/sq mi)

Racial makeup (2011)
  - Black African: 10.9%
  - Coloured: 6.5%
  - Indian/Asian: 3.1%
  - White: 77.3%
  - Other: 2.2%

First languages (2011)
  - English: 67.4%
  - Afrikaans: 22.3%
  - Xhosa: 2.6%
  - Other: 7.7%
- Time zone: UTC+2 (SAST)
- Postal code (street): 7441
- PO box: 7439

Table View is a West Coast suburb of Cape Town, South Africa, named after its view of Table Mountain. It has expanded rapidly since the 1970s and has extensions such as West Riding, Parklands, Sunningdale, and Killarney. Table View has various shopping malls, such as Bayside Mall and Table Bay Mall.

== Table View beach ==
Table View's beach is located along the seafront road. It has numerous parking spots, which are home to local entrepreneurs selling items such as carved animals. The beach stretches both north and south, making it a common place for long jogs or walks. On windy days, local people fly coloured kites of different forms and sizes.

During the day, activities include kitesurfing, surfing, stand-up paddle boarding, running, and cycling proving popular with locals. Many international visitors visit Table View in the summer season to partake in kitesurfing. The coastline boasts as one of the greatest along the region for kitesurfers seeing annual competition events, such as Red Bull King of the Air.

== Table View accommodation ==
The Southern Entrance to Table View on the R27 is marked by the Dolphin Beach hotel, a popular holiday resort. A growing number of accommodation suppliers have been built over the years in Table View and its surroundings. Lodging for BnBs, apartment complexes, and self-catering and backpacker (or hostels) accommodation has also seen growth in recent years. As accommodation has become highly competitive, the general quality of the Table View accommodation suppliers in the suburb has increased rapidly. Many kitesurfers and cultural travelers looking for summertime beach and wind with cultural experiences turn to budget-friendly boutique backpackers' accommodation in the area of Blouberg or Table View.

== Education ==
Table View's primary public schools are Table View Primary School and Table View High School. Nearby suburbs such as Sunningdale have private schools such as Elkanah, Generations, Blouberg international, and Parklands College.

The German International School Cape Town provides bus services from Table View to its main campus in Tamboerskloof.

== See also ==
- Table View High School
- Table View Primary School
