= Rhodes High School (South Africa) =

High school in the Western Cape, South Africa

Rhodes High School is a school in Mowbray, Cape Town Western Cape, South Africa. It was formed in 1978 after the amalgamation of Observatory Girls and Boys High, the 2 schools were relocated from Observatory to Mowbray to occupy the old Nassau Afrikaans medium school which had in turn amalgamated with Groote Schuur high in Newlands.

[1]
