= Mmakau =

- Location within North West (South African province) Location within South Africa
- Coordinates: 25.605°S 27.910°E
- Country: South Africa
- Province: North West
- District: Bojanala Platinum
- Municipality: Madibeng

Area
  - Total: 17.73 km^{2} (6.85 sq mi)

Population (2011)
  - Total: 36,605
  - Density: 2,065/km^{2} (5,347/sq mi)

Racial makeup (2011)
  - Black African: 99.0%
  - Coloured: 0.4%
  - Indian/Asian: 0.2%
  - White: 0.1%
  - Other: 0.4%

First languages (2011)
  - Tswana: 63.0%
  - Northern Sotho: 8.2%
  - Tsonga: 7.8%
  - Zulu: 3.1%
  - Other: 17.9%
- Time zone: UTC+2 (SAST)
- Postal code (street): 0208
- PO box: 0194

Mmakau is a Platinum village in Bojanala District Municipality in the North West province of South Africa. It is located about 12 km to the east of Brits, and 40 kilometres north-west of Pretoria. It is home to the Bakgatla ba Mmakau tribal authority under the leadership of the Motsepe family. Its main land is owned by ten families (from Mampye, Modiselle, Nthite, Bokaba to Leketi) who are the members of the original Bakgatlha tribal community situated in the heart of the village under the leadership of the Motsepe Royal Family.

The Motsepe family members include: Kgosi Augustine Motsepe (chief), Precious Moloi-Motsepe (wife of self proclaimed Kgosi Augustine Motsepe) and their three children.

== Schools ==
- Polonia Primary School
- Mmakau Moemise Primary School
- Tlhopane Primary School
- Sekwati Primary School
- Tsogo Secondary School
- Malatse Motsepe Secondary School
- Morekolodi Primary School
