= Moira Lovell =

South African poet

- Born: May 30, 1951 (age 75); Harare, Rhodesia
- Education: University of Cape Town; University of KwaZulu-Natal

Moira Lovell (born May 30, 1951) was a South African poet, playwright and literary critic prominent in Pietermaritzburg. She has released 5 books of poetry, along with plays and works of fiction. She received the Olive Schreiner Prize for playwriting in 2000.

Lovell was born in Harare, and educated at the University of Cape Town and the University of KwaZulu-Natal. In Pietermaritzburg, she taught English for 4 decades, becoming the head of English at The Wykeham Collegiate, a private girls' school, before retiring in 2015.

== Bibliography ==
Poetry collections

- Out of the Mist (Snailpress, 1994)
- Departures (Snailpress, 1997)
- Not All of Me is Dust: (University of KwaZulu-Natal Press, 2004)
- Speech after long silence (Otterley Press, 2017)
- Notes (Otterley Press, 2023)

Short stories

- Firetalk (1990) ed. Marcia Leveson (Carrafour Press)
- The New South Africa: Writing for a Changing Society (1992) ed. Stephen Cooper (Systime, Denmark)
- No Place Like ... and other stories by South African Women Writers (1999) selected by Robin Malan (David Philip, Cape Town and Sterling Press, Delhi)
- Opbrud (2000) ed. Chris van Wyk in association with Danish publishers AKS/Hjulet
- Post-Traumatic: New South African Writing (2003) ed. Chris van Wyk (Botsotso)

Plays

- Bedtime Stories, awarded the Olive Schreiner Prize and performed in Sydney.
- The Entertainer, awarded ENACT Play of the Year
- The Art of Dreaming, broadcast on SAfm
