= Alexandra High School =

Semi-private, co-educational school in Pietermaritzburg, KwaZulu-Natal, South Africa

Location
- Pietermaritzburg, KwaZulu-Natal; South Africa; 29.61721°S 30.38836°E

Information
- Type: Semi-Private, Co-Educational
- Motto: Summa Diligentia Laboro ("I strive to work with diligence")
- Established: 1960
- Locale: Suburban
- Principal: Mrs. A. Pillay
- Grades: 8–12
- Enrollment: Approximately 1000 pupils - Girls: 378, Boys: 622
- Student to teacher ratio: 1:32
- Houses: Allison's; Boyds; Downs; Shepstones; Trollips
- Color
- Sports: Rugby, Netball, Cricket, Hockey, Soccer, Choir, Debating, Swimming, Basketball
- Mascot: Ellie the Elephant
- Tuition: School fees: R 21 000 p.a Boarding Fees: Full Time - R 70 000 p.a Weekday - R56 000 p.a
- Website: www.alexhigh.org.za

Alexandra High School (AHS) is a semi-private public high school in Pietermaritzburg, KwaZulu-Natal, South Africa. The school offers a co-educational environment and boarding facilities. The principal is Anusha Pilay, the first woman and person of colour to head the school.

== History ==
The School opened on 23 February 1960, with the headmaster Mr F. H. Udal, leading the boy's first school assembly under a Jacaranda tree. The same month in which Harold Mc Millan delivered his Wind of Change speech in Capetown.

The school takes its name from Alexandra of Denmark, Queen Consort and Princess of Wales from 1863 to 1901. She was a popular figure from a century prior, when the neighbouring park was laid out in 1860 and named in her honour in 1863, called Alexandra Park. She married Albert Edward Prince of Wales in that year, and later became Queen Alexandra with King Edward VII. A portrait of Queen Alexandra sits in the school library.

== Founders House ==
In 1966 the boarding establishment Founders House was opened with 110 boys. Today the "BE" (boarding establishment) is also co-educational residence that offers supervised home from home facilities.

Though the school and the BE was initially a whites-only, all-boys high school. The first non-white pupil was admitted in June 1991, when race classification was abolished Alexandra High School continued to lead change and became co-educational at the beginning of 1992. The school has a mural in its hall. The plaque was designed and built by the late Syliva Baxter. It took months of work to mould, colour and bake the clay. It was fired in forty-six pieces of ceramic clay, measuring 4 metres by 2 metres and its mass is over a ton. Metallic oxides were used to give it colour. The plaque was unveiled by Alfred Ernest Trollip, then Administrator of Natal, when the school was officially opened on 25 September 1964.

== Notable Old Alexandrians ==
- Graeme Pope-Ellis, canoeist, fifteen-time Dusi Canoe Marathon winner
- Kork Ballington, South African former professional motorcycle racer, four-time FIM road racing world champion
- Christopher Duigan, concert pianist and composer
