= Kathleen D. Gordon-Gray =

(1918-2012) South African botanist

Kathleen Dixon Gordon-Gray
- Born: Kathleen Dixon Huntley; 24 January 1918; Pietermaritzburg
- Died: 13 January 2012 (aged 93); Pietermaritzburg
- Other name: Kath
- Citizenship: South African
- Education: University of Natal
- Known for: Taxonomy of Acacia, Cassia, Cyperaceae, and Gramineae
- Spouse: Claude Gordon Gordon-Gray
- Children: Celia Gordon-Gray
- Relatives: Maj Gordon Gordon-Gray MC DSO (father in law); Cmdt John Louis Gordon-Gray DSO (brother in law)
- Scientific career
- Fields: Botany
- Workplaces: University of Natal

Kathleen Dixon Gordon-Gray (née Huntley) (born 24 January 1918, Pietermaritzburg, died 13 January 2012, Pietermaritzburg) was a South African botanist, plant collector, and educator noted for her expertise in the flora of Natal. She worked as both a lecturer and professor of botany at the University of Natal. In 1998 she was awarded the Senior (Silver) Medal of the South African Association of Botanists. Her research publications primarily covered the taxonomy of Acacia, Cassia, Cyperaceae, and Gramineae.

== Education and career ==
Gordon-Gray was born in Pietermaritzburg where she attended Pietermaritzburg Girls' High School and the Natal University College of the University of South Africa. She completed her B.Sc. (Botany & Chemistry) in 1937, followed by an M.Sc. (Botany) in 1939 and PhD (Botany) in 1959.

She taught Biology at the Girls' Collegiate School from 1940 to 1945 and was appointed the Herbarium Assistant in 1946. In 1951 she was appointed Lecturer in the department of Botany at the University of Natal. She held the post of Senior lecturer from 1967 to 1976 and from 1977 until her mandatory retirement in 1978, Associate Professor.

Gordon-Gray donated a sum of money to the University of Natal to establish the Kathleen Gordon-Gray Prize for the Best Third-Year Student in Plant Systematics.

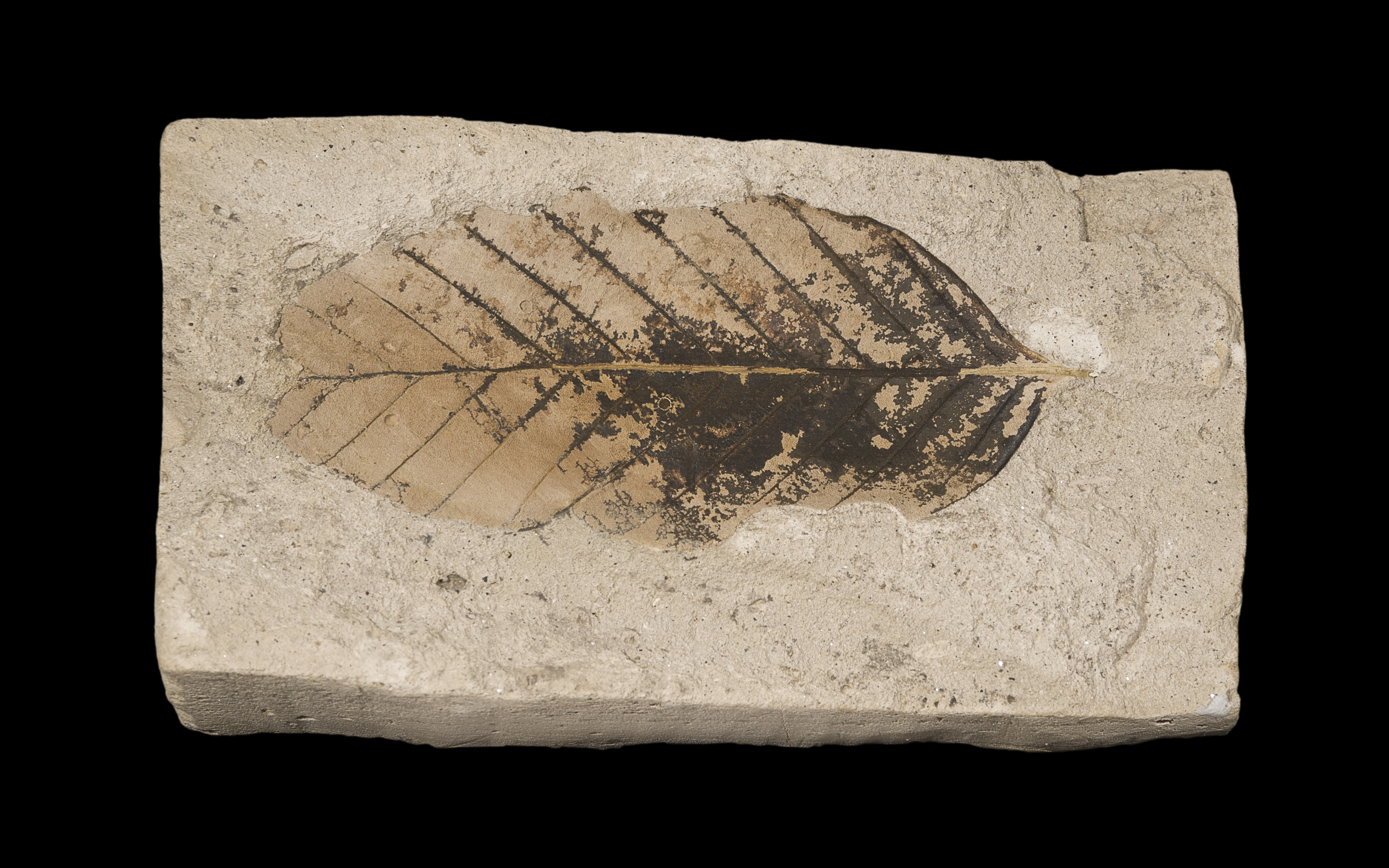
A leaf fossil of the European beech (Fagus sylvatica) from the late Pliocene of France, approximately three million years ago

She continued to work after her retirement and was involved in fieldwork until 1965, during which time she collected approximately 4000 specimens of flora. An undiagnosed injury to her femur that she had sustained in her youth severely restricted her mobility later in life but she continued to catalogue materials supplied by fellow botanists, students and friends.

In 1998 she received the Senior (Silver) Medal from the South African Association of Botanists.

Her major publications involved Cyperaceae, Poaceae, Acacia and Cassia but her interest and expertise included many vascular plant families and other fields such as Paleobotany.

She was still engaged in a collaboration with Jane Browning and C.J. Ward to prepare a joint article for publication up to a few days before her death in January 2012.

The standard author abbreviation Gordon-Gray is used to indicate this person as the author when citing a botanical name.

== Selected publications ==
- Gordon-Gray, K.D. (1995). Cyperaceae in Natal. Strelitzia Series. National Botanical Institute. ISBN 978-1-874907-04-6.
- Lacey, W.S.; van Dijk, D.E.; Gordon-Gray, K.D. (1974). "New Permian Glossopteris flora from Natal". South African Journal of Science. 70: 131–141.
