= Samuel Evans Rowe =

English clergyman (1834–1897)

The Reverend Samuel Evans Rowe (1 September 1834 – 4 July 1897) was a minister who reached high rank in the Methodist church before a distinguished period as a missionary in South Africa, holding senior posts in the church, and founding an educational institution for girls.

== Early life ==
He was born in Midsomer Norton, Somerset, England, on 1 September 1834. He was one of six children. His father was a Methodist minister, the Reverend Samuel Rowe, and his mother was Mary Ann Evans.

He attended school at Woodhouse Grove in Yorkshire. He spent a few years in business and also teaching, before beginning to preach.

== Career ==
In 1857, he was accepted as a Candidate for the Ministry, and entered Didsbury College, but had to leave almost immediately to take his first appointment. He spent three years in Cornwall and then moved to Exeter.

He entered the Wesleyan ministry and preached in several towns in England. He served on the London Circuit before going to South Africa as a missionary. He was appointed to Pietermaritzburg, where he worked from 1880 to 1893. He founded the educational Institution for Native Girls and was also Chairman of the Maritzburg Girls' Collegiate School. His sister Annie Evans Rowe was the head of the Girls' Collegiate School and later founded Uplands High School for Girls at Blackridge; his daughter Agnes was co-founder of Merchiston Preparatory School.

In 1890, he was elected President of the Methodist Conference in Cape Town. In 1895 he was appointed to the Harrismith Circuit. In 1896 he was invited to be the Superintendent of the Cape Town Circuit, but declined this on health grounds, and requested a year's home leave in England.

On his return to South Africa a year later, he died of a brain haemorrhage as his ship, the Tantallon Castle, was docking at Port Elizabeth. He is buried there at the South End Cemetery.

== Family ==
He was married to Lillian Budge. They had six children.
