= Hilton Arts Festival =

Arts festival in South Africa

The Witness Hilton Arts Festival
- Genre: Arts Festival
- Dates: September annually
- Location: Hilton College
- Coordinates: 29.556029°N 30.285885°E
- Years active: 20
- Founded: 1993
- Patrons: The Witness, Hilton College, East Coast Radio, Grindrod Bank, SPAR, SAB, KZN Dept of Arts & Culture
- Website: https://www.hiltonfestival.co.za

The Hilton Arts Festival is an arts festival in South Africa. It is held on the Hilton College campus each year in August and runs for four days. The festival began in 1993 and was designed to emulate the National Arts Festival in Grahamstown.

The annual Hilton Arts Festival features a program of theatre, music, dance, craft and visual art, as well as food. The Hilton College Theatre is the second largest, fixed-seated venue in KwaZulu-Natal, with a seating capacity of 486.

The festival is attended by a large number of well known local and international stars, such as Christopher Duigan and Johnny Clegg.
