= Msunduzi =

Msunduzi may refer to:

- The Msunduzi River, in KwaZulu-Natal
- The Msunduzi Local Municipality, named after the river
