= Pietermaritzburg Girls' High School =

Location
- 186 Alexandra Road; Pelham; KwaZulu-Natal; Pietermaritzburg, 3201; South Africa; 29.62542°S 30.38442°E

Information
- School type: Semi-private, All-girls
- Motto: Cheerfulness With Industry
- Established: 1920; 106 years ago
- School district: Umgungundlovu
- Principal: Matthew Marwick
- Staff: 100 full-time
- Grades: 8–12
- Gender: Female
- Age: 14 to 18
  - Grade 8: 240
  - Grade 9: 240
  - Grade 10: 240
  - Grade 11: 240
  - Grade 12: 240
- Average class size: 30
- Student to teacher ratio: 1:12
- Education system: CAPS
- Language: English
- Schedule: '07:30 - 14:15'
- Campus: Urban Campus
- Campus size: 11 hectares (27 acres)
- Houses: Amethyst; Citrine; Garnet; Morganite; Ruby; Sapphire; Topaz; Tanzanite
- Colours: Green & white
- Sports: Yes
- Mascot: Elly the Elephant
- Nickname: GHS
- Rivals: Durban Girls' College; Danville Park Girls' High; St. John's Diocesan School for Girls; Epworth School; St. Anne's Diocesan College; The Wykeham Collegiate
- Newspaper: Green Elly
- School fees: Grade 8: R51 220 pa Grades 9-12: R47 979 pa Boarding fees: R74 114 pa
- Feeder schools: Pelham Senior Primary School; Long Market Girls' School; Scottsville Primary School; Deckon Road Primary School; Athlone Primary School; Clarendon Primary School; Howick Preparatory School; Laddsworth Primary; Clifton Nottingham Road Primary School; Bisley Park Primary School
- National Monument: Main school building, designed after the style of Sir Herbert Baker

Pietermaritzburg Girls' High School (GHS) is a semi-private, all girls, day and boarding school situated in the urban city of Pietermaritzburg, KwaZulu-Natal, South Africa.

== History ==
The school was founded in 1920 in the family mansion of Morningside, the home of Peter and Mary Davis. In 1925, Morningside became a boarding establishment. The main school building, designed after the style of Sir Herbert Baker, is now a National Monument.

== Notable alumnae ==
- Judy Ditchfield, actress
- Kathleen D. Gordon-Gray, botanist, plant collector and educator
- Thuso Mbedu, actress
