= Graeme Pope-Ellis =

Personal information
- Nicknames: Dusi King, Pope
- Nationality: South African
- Born: 26 July 1947 Bishopstowe, South Africa
- Died: 17 June 2010 (aged 62) Bishopstowe, South Africa
- Education: Alexandra High School
- Occupation(s): Canoeist, Farmer, Entrepreneur
- Years active: 1965 - 2010

Graeme "Pope" Pope-Ellis (26 July 1947 in Pietermaritzburg, South Africa – 17 June 2010) was a South African canoeist best known for his 46 consecutive year Dusi Canoe Marathon career, having won the race a record 15 times.

== Personal life ==
Pope-Ellis grew up along the banks of the Msunduzi River on a farm in Ashburton, just outside Pietermaritzburg, South Africa. He attended Alexandra High School in Pietermaritzburg and completed his first Dusi in 1965, aged 17.

== Dusi career ==
Pope-Ellis completed the Dusi Canoe Marathon, arguably the world's most prestigious canoe race, 46 consecutive times between 1965 and 2010. He also hold the record for having won the race 15 times. Pope-Ellis has become synonymous with the race and has been affectionately named the "Dusi King". Pope-Ellis won his first Dusi in 1972 with K2 partner Eric Clarke and became the first person to win the Dusi in a single canoe in 1981. Between 1970 and 1990 he won a total of three Dusis with Clarke, four with Tim Cornish, five with Peter Peacock and three K1 victories. Furthermore during this period only once, in 1979, did Pope-Ellis fail to either win or take second position.

== Influence ==
Pope-Ellis has been called South Africa's pre-eminent sportsman and is one of the best known canoeists in the world. Pope Ellis has been heavily involved with the development of canoeing in South Africa and has mentored and coached a number of South Africa's top paddlers including seven time Dusi winner Martin Dreyer and former World champion Shaun Rubenstein. Pope-Ellis was also instrumental in the development of kayaks in South Africa whilst running Pope's Canoe Centre, a successful boat-building business in Pietermaritzburg. Fluent in isiZulu, he was closely involved with the people who live in the valleys that the 120 km race is run through.

Pope-Ellis also won many other canoe races, including twice winning the prestigious Umkomaas Canoe Marathon, a big water race with minimal portaging.

== Death ==
Pope-Ellis died on 17 June 2010 on his farm in Bishopstowe while driving his tractor. An accident occurred while ploughing his fields, causing the tractor to roll over him.
