= Gordon Gray =

Gordon Gray may refer to:

- Gordon Gray (cardinal) (1910–1993), Scottish Cardinal Archbishop of St Andrews and Edinburgh
- Gordon Gray (politician) (1909–1982), official in the government of the United States during the administrations of Harry Truman and Dwight Eisenhower
- Gordon Gray (rugby) (1909–1975), Scottish rugby union and rugby league player
- Gordon Gray III (born 1956), U.S. ambassador
- Gordon-Gray, the author abbreviation for Kathleen D. Gordon-Gray (1918–2012)
