= Merchiston Preparatory School =

School in Pietermaritzburg, South Africa

Merchiston Preparatory School was founded in Pietermaritzburg, South Africa in 1892. It was founded by Miss Agnes Rowe and Miss Elizabeth Allan who were inspired by Merchiston Castle School in Edinburgh, Scotland.

== Pupils ==
Merchiston Preparatory School is a boys' preparatory school which offers day-schooling from Grade RRR to Grade 7 and boarding for Grade 3 to Grade 7. Merchiston is an established feeder school for Maritzburg College.

== Motto ==
The school's motto is Ready Aye Ready. Again, it is closely based on the Merchiston Castle School motto of Ready Ay Ready. This motto means "ready, yes, ready".

== Notable Merchistonians ==
- Butch James, rugby player
- Craig Joubert, international rugby referee
- Cuan McCarthy, cricketer
- Brett Evans, PSL & international football player
- Darian Townsend, Olympic swimmer
- Ian Kirkpatrick (South African rugby player)
- Jonty Rhodes, cricketer
- Kevin Pietersen, cricketer
- Nils Bang, oceanographer
- Shaun Morgan, musician
- Harold Strachan, artist and freedom fighter
- Jesse Kriel, Springbok rugby player

== See also ==
- Samuel Evans Rowe
