= Christopher Duigan =

South African pianist, composer (born 1968)

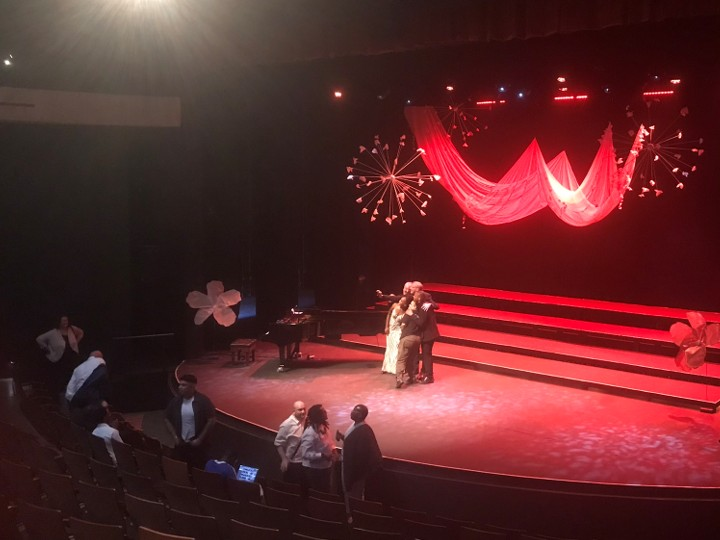
- Christopher, Yoliswa, Frederico and Sizwe at the University of Johannesburg Deans Concert (2025)

Background information
- Genre: Classical Piano
- Years active: 1991 - present
- Website: www.musicrevival.co.za
- fn

Christopher Duigan (born 1968) is a South African-born pianist, composer and independent classical music entrepreneur who is considered, both by critics and audiences, to be one of the leading concert pianists in South Africa. Duigan, a designated Steinway Artist, has played professionally since 1991. He regularly gives solo performances and collaborates with ensembles, averaging around 100 events annually. His programming often includes informal or non-traditional venues, aiming to broaden the appeal of classical music. Duigan has launched alternative venues for performances, using his own home, Casa Mexicana playing in patrons homes, at beautiful venues or offering concerts via live streaming while also performing in traditional concert halls with the KwaZulu-Natal Philharmonic, the Cape Philharmonic; and Johannesburg Philharmonic Orchestra.

== Early life and studies ==
Duigan was born in Pietermaritzburg, the youngest of five children. He attended Pelham Primary and Alexandra High School. Duigan began playing at age 7 with Anette Kerkovius and his music studies continued under Italian concert pianist Isabella Stengel from age 14. At Alexandra High School Duigan did double music and eventually graduated from the University of Natal (cum laude). He furthered his studies with Lamar Crowson and Albie van Schalkwyk at UCT and in 1994, he graduated with a m Mus (performance).

== Career ==
Duigan made his professional debut with the Cape Town Symphony Orchestra in 1991. For over 30 years, Duigan has remained sustainable as a self-employed impresario who has organized, played, promoted and recorded classical music. Duigan has combined performance with entrepreneurial activities, including marketing and adapting to digital formats such as live-streaming. His approach has been noted for its versatility and sustainability in the classical music sector.

== Music Revival ==
In 1997, Duigan founded Music Revival, a platform for organizing concerts and promoting classical music outside institutional structures. At a time when South Africa's public funding for the arts was dependent on political patronage, Music Revival maintained a presence for classical music through independent initiatives, such as his Music Revival platform.

== Streaming during lockdown ==
During the COVID-19 lockdown in South Africa, Music Revival transitioned to an online format. Beginning in 2020, Duigan livestreamed performances from his home, ultimately giving around 250 online concerts through 2024. The livestreams concluded on 16 October 2024 due to financial constraints.[2]

== Discography ==
=== Studio albums ===
Year of issue	Title	Details	Media	Record label
2015	Indigo	David Salleras with Christopher Duigan.	INDIGO on YouTube	Music Revival
2016	Chopin	Christopher Duigan plays Chopin (16/02/2016)		Music Revival
2016	Midnight Blue	Christopher Duigan with David Salleras	MIDNIGHT BLUE on YouTube	Music Revival
