= Good Hope Jet =

Shelf edge frontal current off of South Africa's coast

The Good Hope Jet is the northward-running shelf edge frontal jet of the Southern Benguela Current off the Cape Peninsula of South Africa's west coast. The jet, an intrusion of water from the Agulhas Current, was first described by South African oceanographers, Nils Bang and W.R.H. (Bill) Andrews in 1974. This warm water jet forms a sharp front as it comes into contact with the colder upwelled water over the shelf and plays a key role in carrying fish eggs and larvae from their food-poor Agulhas Bank spawning grounds to inshore nurseries.
