= Thami Mngqolo =

South African actor (born 1982)

- Born: Zeke Elakhe Lungelo Mngqolo; 9 September 1982 (age 43); Johannesburg, South Africa
- Occupation: Actor
- Years active: 1998–present
- Partner: Jo-Anne Reyneke (2008–2018)

Zeke Elakhe Lungelo Mngqolo (born 9 September 1982), popularly known as Thami Mngqolo, is a South African actor and director. He is best known for his roles in the popular series Generations, State Enemy No.1 and Greed and Desire.

== Personal life ==
Mngqolo was born on 9 September 1982 in Johannesburg, South Africa as the second child of the family. He has one elder sister Nosiphowo Mngqolo, who died in 2016.

He had a long-term relationship with fellow actress Jo-Anne Reyneke. They began dating in 2008 and had two children, Uvolwethu (born in 2013) and Lungelo (born in 2015). In 2018, the couple called it quits after Reyneke allegedly found a compromising video on his cell phone.

== Career ==
In 2009, he appeared in the television serial Generations and played the role of Senzo Dlomo, a gay man. In 2016, he stopped acting in the series when its entire main cast was fired over their demands for a higher salary. He has also featured in State Enemy No.1. He also played as a receptionist in popular soap opera Muvhango. In November 2020, he joined the cast of the telenovela Isono. In the series, he plays the role Maradona.

== Filmography ==
Year	Film	Role	Genre	Ref.
2009–2016	Generations	Senzo Dlomo	TV series	
2016	Greed and Desire	Kenny Msomi	TV series	
2016	Igazi	Jonga Mbangatha	TV series	
2020	State Enemy No.1	Thulani	Film	
2020	Isono	Maradona	TV Series	
