= Russell High School (Pietermaritzburg) =

Public girls school in KwaZulu-Natal, South Africa

Location
- Corner of Peter Kerchoff and Hoosen Haffejee streets, Pietermaritzburg, KwaZulu-Natal; South Africa; 29.60255°S 30.37211°E

Information
- Type: Public, girls' school
- Motto: Semper Parata
- Established: 1879
- Locale: Urban
- Headmaster: Mrs. A. Rampersadh
- Exam board: KZN
- Grades: 8–12
- Enrollment: Approximately 500 girls
- Colours: Blue, White & Green
- Website: www.russellhigh.co.za

Russell High School is a public high school for girls, located in the city of Pietermaritzburg, KwaZulu-Natal, South Africa.

== History ==
On 23 January 1879, Robert Russell the Superintendent inspector for education in the Natal colony, placed an advertisement in the newspaper for a new school called the Model primary school for girls, it would later be changed into a high school. The school opened on 6 March 1879 in a single storey building on the corner of Berg and Chapel streets (later renamed Peter Kerchoff and Hoosen Haffejee), making it the oldest girls' only public school in Kwazulu-Natal. The school had 3 teachers and 169 pupils with Mrs. Eleanor Broome appointed as the school's first principal.

The current school building was built in 1897.In 1941, the school was renamed Russell high school, to honour the founder of the school, Robert Russell. In 1979, on the schools centenary year, the school building was named as a national monument.

== Academics ==
The school offers a full academic programme with extended drama and arts subjects. It is also one of the few schools that offer German(2nd language) as a subject. The school offers the following subjects:

- English and Zulu Home Language
- Zulu First Additional Language
- Afrikaans First Additional Language
- Life Sciences
- Physical Science
- Mathematics and Mathematical Literacy
- Computer Applications Technology
- Visual Arts
- Dramatic Arts
- Accounting
- Business Studies
- Geography
- Hospitality Studies

The following extramural and leadership opportunities are currently offered at the school:

- Rotary Interact
- Student Christian Association
- Audio Visual Society
- Grade 11 Fundraising
- Quiz Team
- Public Speaking
- Library
- Safety and Security Committee
- Russell Mentors
- Representative Council for Learners
- Leadership Courses
- Service Club

== Sports ==
The school offers the following sports:

- Hockey
- Netball
- Basketball
- Softball
- Bowls
- Soccer
- Inter-house programmes
- Fun Run
- Dancing

== Notable Alumnae ==
Zama Magubane - Actress
Jo-anne Reyneke - Actress & presenter
