= Mark Perrow =

South African canoeist (1965–2020)

Mark Perrow (13 November 1965 – 15 March 2020) was a South African canoe sprinter who competed in the early 1990s. At the 1992 Summer Olympics in Barcelona, he was eliminated in the semifinals of both the K-1 1000 m and the K-4 1000 m events. He won the Dusi Canoe Marathon in 1991 with Anthony Wald and then had numerous wins in both the single and double categories with Neil Evens, and Martin Dreyer. He had an illustrious canoeing career spanning from the late 1980s to the early 2000s, winning all major events in that era.

Perrow was killed in a plane crash in March 2020.
