= Jo-Anne Reyneke =

South African actress

- Born: Jo-Anne Reyneke; 2 June 1988 (age 37); Vereeniging, Gauteng, South Africa
- Education: Russell High School
- Occupations: Actress; voice-over artist
- Years active: 2008–present
- Partner: Thami Mngqolo (2008–18)
- Children: 2

Jo-Anne Reyneke (born 2 June 1988) is a South African actress and voice-over artist best known for her television soap opera roles as Pearl on SABC 2's Muvhango and as Prudence Oliphant, an office manager for Redemption Records, on e.tv's Rhythm City.

== Early life ==
Jo-Anne Reyneke was born in Vereeniging, Gauteng to a black Zulu mother and a white father. She was raised with her brother in Pietermaritzburg, KwaZulu-Natal by her single mother. She has spoken about how she was teased growing up in the township because of her light in complexion skin and features due to her mixed-race heritage. She attended Russell High School where she became interested in drama and the performing arts. After matriculating, she enrolled at Movietech Film and Television School in Durban where she studied performing and music.

== Career ==
Reyneke began her career at The Playhouse Company, Durban when she was cast in the Duma Ndlovu play The Game, starring alongside Mary Twala, Lucia Mthiyane, and Sindi Dlathu. As Duma Ndlovu was the creator of the play and the creator and executive producer of Muvhango, Reyneke was offered a role on the show as Pearl a receptionist. It was her breakthrough role, gaining her recognition. In 2013, she left Muvhango, featuring in Intersexions, before appearing in Rhythm City later that year. She has gone on to appear in prominent roles in TV series: High Rollers, Isidingo and Scandal!. In 2018, she starred as Sli in SABC 1's series Side Dish. In 2019, she appeared in BET's comedy show Black Tax with Jason Goliath and Mamodibe Ramodibe. She is currently leading a SABC3 telenovela TheEstate opposite Aubrey Poolo.

== Personal life ==
In 2008, Reyneke began dating then Generations actor Thami Mngqolo, who played the role of Senzo Dlomo. The couple had two children, Uvolwethu born in 2013 and Lungelo born in 2015. In 2018, after 10 years together, the couple called it quits.
