= Amod Cassimjee =

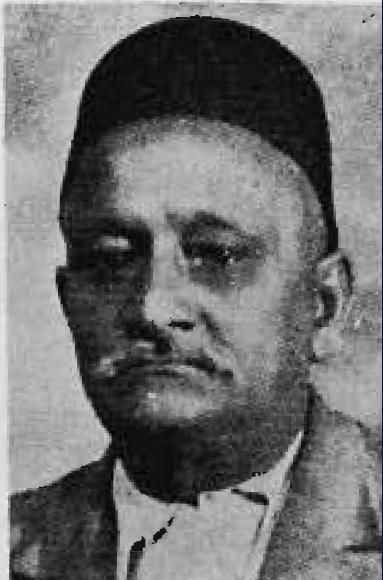
- Born: Amod Cassimjee; 1871; Surat, India
- Died: 16 May 1951 (aged 80)
- Resting place: Mountain Rise Cemetery, Pietermaritzburg, South Africa
- Occupation: Businessman
- Known for: Businessman, Industrialist
- Spouses: Ayesha Cassimjee; Hawa Bibi Cassimjee
- Children: Ismail Amod Cassimjee; Khatija Cassimjee; Fathima Cassimjee; Ayesha Cassimjee

Amod Cassimjee was a business person born and educated in Surat, India. He arrived in South Africa in 1895 and settled in Pietermaritzburg.

== Business ==
He joined his brother Suleman, trading as Suleman Cassimjee & Co. for a few years. Amod then established his first business in Kranskop. Amod later returned to Pietermaritzburg and entered into partnership as Amod Mahomed & Co. The partnership was dissolved in 1913 and Amod Cassimjee assumed his sole ownership of the business and traded under his own name. It was one of the best known firms in Upper Church Street in the African trade with a European department boasting a large clientele. Also entered the Shoe Manufacturing Field. One of the most colourful personalities in the City and popularly known by a wide African custom as "Khandalemvu". He was interested in all Indian activities and as a Grand Old man laid the foundation stone of the Mohammedian Oriental School. Attached to the Upper Church Street Mosque. Amod and Suleman Cassimjee formed a company called Suleman Cassimjee & Co. The business was started in Winterton, Kwa-Zulu Natal. Mahomed Cassimjee and Amod joined their brother in the company Suleman Cassimjee & Co. for a few years.

== Personal and community leadership ==
Amod Cassimjee was keenly interested in the welfare of the Muslims as well as the Indian community as a whole. He laid the foundation for the establishment of the Muhammadan Oriental School (now Government-aided). He was ever prepared to assist all movements directed for the good of the community.

== Death ==
Amod Cassimjee died on 16 May 1951 at the age of 80. He was buried in the Mountain Rise Cemetery in Pietermaritzburg, South Africa.
