= Dusi Canoe Marathon =

Canoe race in South Africa

- Date: February
- Location: Pietermaritzburg/Durban, South Africa
- Event type: Canoe Marathon
- Distance: 120 kilometres (75 mi)
- Established: 1951
- Website: The Dusi Canoe Marathon

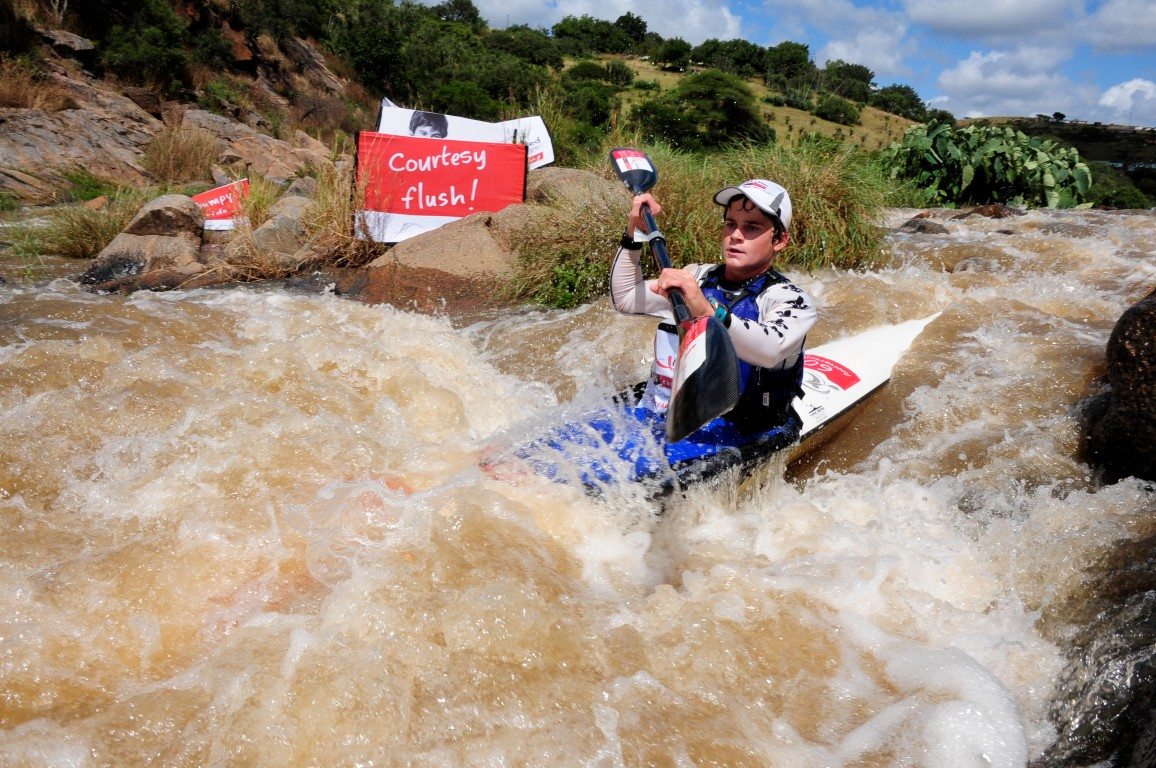
A paddler shooting Mission Rapid during the Dusi Canoe Marathon

The Dusi Canoe Marathon is a marathon canoe race held over three days between Pietermaritzburg and Durban, South Africa. It is run along the Msunduzi and Mgeni Rivers over a total distance of 120 kilometres (75 mi). The race attracts between 1600 and 2000 paddlers each year, making it the biggest canoeing event on the African continent. It is organised by the Natal Canoe Club. The clubhouse is located on the banks of the Msunduzi River, at the exact start point of the race.

The Dusi Canoe Marathon is held over a period of three days, with each day having a defined beginning and end. The average finishing time for top teams is under nine hours.

The race begins at the Natal Canoe Club at Camps Drift in Pietermaritzburg. The first stage is 42 kilometres (26 mi) and includes 15 kilometres (9.3 mi) of portaging. The 46 kilometres (29 mi) second stage to Inanda Dam includes the confluence of the Mgeni and Msundusi Rivers and an 11 kilometres (6.8 mi) flatwater paddle across the dam. The third stage to Blue Lagoon in Durban is the shortest, 36 kilometres (22 mi), however it still contains a 10 kilometres (6.2 mi) flatwater paddle across the lagoon. The finish of the race is at the Kingfisher Canoe Club.

Competitors may enter the K1, K2, White Water, Touring or Touring Canadian (open canoes paddled by one or two paddlers using single blade paddles) Classes. Touring class kayaks may have rudders and this class includes all K3s, K4s and plastic kayaks. SUPs form part of the Touring Class.

== History ==
The first recorded trip down the Dusi by boat was recorded in the Natal Witness in 1893. Two Pietermaritzburg men, Paul Marianni and William Foley, covered the distance in seven days, arriving at Blue Lagoon on 10 January 1893. It was not until 1951 that a race along the river would formally be held between Pietermaritzburg and Durban. The first ever Dusi Canoe Marathon was organised by Ian Player and began on 22 December 1951. The race was held with a non-stop format and no time limit. Of the eight paddlers that entered the race: Ian Player, Miles Brokensha, Ernie Pearce, John Naude, Basil Halford, Willie Potgieter, Fred Schmidt and Denis Vorster only Player finished the race in a time of 6 days, 8 hours and 15 minutes. The canoes used in the first race were made from wood and canvas and weighed 32 kilograms (71 lb). The paddlers also had to carry all the supplies they needed in order to complete the race.

The first three-day race was held in 1956 with changes being made to the format over fears for paddler safety when paddling at night.

The Dusi Canoe Marathon was started by Ian Player in the early 1950s and this book tells the story of how it all began. The first edition of Men, Rivers and Canoes was published in 1964, and reissued in 2007 in South Africa ISBN 978-0-9802501-2-1

== Previous Winners ==
Men
| Year | Class | Overall | | Time | R |
|---|---|---|---|---|---|
| 1952 | K1 | I PLAYER | | 152:15:00 | |
| 1953 | K1'S | I PLAYER | F SCHMIDT | 86:00:00 | |
| 1954 | K1's | I PLAYER | F SCHMIDT | 36:41:00 | * |
| 1955 | K1's | E PEARCE | R TEMPLETON | 27:28:00 | * |
| 1956 | K1's | E PEARCE | R TEMPLETON | 19:44:30 | * |
| 1957 | K1's | E PEARCE | R TEMPLETON | 14:55:00 | * |
| 1958 | K2 | R GOULDIE | D ANTROBUS | 17:20:20 | |
| 1959 | K1's | H FISHER | G ROWE | 12:32:14 | * |
| 1960 | K1's | G ROWE | H FISHER | 15:45:17 | |
| 1961 | K1's | G ROWE | H FISHER | 12:18:00 | * |
| 1962 | K2 | D ANTROBUS | P GLADWIN | 11:24:36 | * |
| 1963 | K1's | G ROWE | H FISHER | 11:30:19 | * |
| 1964 | K1's | H FISHER | G ROWE | 11:10:05 | * |
| 1965 | K2 | D COBBLEDICK | C MASON | 13:33:47 | |
| 1966 | K2 | J POTGIETER | C CRAWLEY | 13:20:00 | |
| 1967 | K2 | C MASON | K RODGERS | 10:30:35 | * |
| 1968 | K2 | J POTGIETER | C HOUGH | 10:02:32 | * |
| 1969 | K2 | W VAN RIET | R VAN RIET | 15:36:03 | |
| 1970 | K2 | W VAN RIET | R VAN RIET | 11:11:26 | |
| 1971 | K2 | W VAN RIET | R VAN RIET | 11:06:08 | |
| 1972 | K2 | E CLARKE | G Pope-Ellis | 09:28:48 | * |
| 1973 | K2 | E CLARKE | G Pope-Ellis | 10:56:03 | |
| 1974 | K2 | G Pope-Ellis | E CLARKE | 10:55:30 | |
| 1975 | K2 | G Pope-Ellis | P PEACOCK | 10:12:25 | |
| 1976 | K2 | G Pope-Ellis | P PEACOCK | 08:23:12 | * |
| 1977 | K2 | G Pope-Ellis | P PEACOCK | 09:15:00 | |
| 1978 | K2 | G Pope-Ellis | P PEACOCK | 08:33:59 | |
| 1979 | K2 | T BIGGS | R STEWART | 08:43:16 | |
| 1980 | K2 | G Pope-Ellis | P PEACOCK | 09:05:07 | |
| 1981 | K1 | G Pope-Ellis | | 09:47:19 | |
| 1982 | K2 | D BIGGS | T BIGGS | 08:43:22 | |
| 1983 | K2 | G Pope-Ellis | TJ CORNISH | 09:32:39 | |
| 1984 | K1 | G Pope-Ellis | | 09:56:44 | |
| 1985 | K1 | J EDMONDS | | 10:26:38 | |
| 1986 | K2 | G Pope-Ellis | TJ CORNISH | 08:18:02 | * |
| 1987 | K1 | G Pope-Ellis | | 08:48:23 | * |
| 1988 | K2 | G Pope-Ellis | TJ CORNISH | 08:07:08 | * |
| 1989 | K1 | J EDMONDS | | 08:34:51 | * |
| 1990 | K2 | G Pope-Ellis | TJ CORNISH | 08:43:39 | |
| 1991 | K1 | J EDMONDS | | 08:17:54 | * |
| 1992 | K2 | N EVANS | Mark Perrow | 08:01:33 | * |
| 1993 | K1 | K WHITE | | 09:40:07 | |
| 1994 | K2 | J EDMONDS | KJ WHITE | 08:47:09 | |
| 1995 | K1 | K WHITE | | 08:43:28 | |
| 1996 | K2 | N EVANS | Mark Perrow | 08:15:33 | |
| 1997 | K1 | Mark Perrow | | 08:26:30 | |
| 1998 | K2 | A STOTT | KJ MURRAY | 08:03:09 | |
| 1999 | K1 | M DREYER | | 08:49:46 | |
| 2000 | K2 | M DREYER | Mark Perrow | 07:56:35 | * |
| 2001 | K1 | L JENKINS JNR | | 08:09:09 | * |
| 2002 | K2 | M DREYER | D BRUSS | 07:44:56 | * |
| 2003 | K1 | M DREYER | | 08:31:31 | * |
| 2004 | K2 | M DREYER | A STOTT | 07:45:50 | |
| 2005 | K1 | H MC GREGOR | | 08:16:58 | |
| 2006 | K2 | M DREYER | H MCGREGOR | 07:40:25 | * |
| 2007 | K1 | A STOTT | | 08:03:22 | * |
| 2008 | K2 | MJ DREYER | M MBANJWA | 07:33:24 | * |
| 2009 | K1 | A STOTT | | 08:38:54 | |
| 2010 | K2 | AJ BIRKETT | JA GRAHAM | 07:42:04 | |
| 2011 | K1 | AJ BIRKETT | | 08:06:08 | |
| 2012 | K2 | AJ BIRKETT | JA GRAHAM | 07:43:02 | |
| 2013 | K1 | L KIME | | 08:00:29 | * |
| 2014 | K2 | AJ BIRKETT | S ZONDI | 07:43:50 | |
| 2015 | K1 | AJ BIRKETT | | 07:55:35 | * |
| 2016 | K2 | AJ BIRKETT | L KIME | 07:52:09 | |
| 2017 | K1 | AJ BIRKETT | | 08:32:55 | |
| 2018 | K2 | AJ BIRKETT | H MCGREGOR | 08:12:22 | |
| 2019 | K1 | AJ BIRKETT | | 08:09:48 | |

Woman
| Year | Class | Overall | | Time | R |
|---|---|---|---|---|---|
| 1986 | K2 | M LOEWENSTEIN | J BENTEL | 12:03:08 | * |
| 1987 | K1 | M LOEWENSTEIN | | 11:51:50 | * |
| 1988 | K2 | M LOEWENSTEIN | J BENTEL | 12:32:03 | |
| 1989 | K1 | M LOEWENSTEIN | | 11:46:38 | * |
| 1990 | K2 | M LOEWENSTEIN | J BENTEL | 12:20:31 | |
| 1991 | K1 | M LOEWENSTEIN | | 10:34:44 | * |
| 1992 | K2 | M LOEWENSTEIN | J BENTEL | 10:27:07 | * |
| 1993 | K1 | M LOEWENSTEIN | | 12:25:40 | |
| 1994 | K2 | N RENNIE | W WHITE | 11:27:31 | |
| 1995 | K1 | A MANFRONI | | 11:47:20 | |
| 1996 | K2 | D GERMIQUET | W WHITE | 10:02:13 | * |
| 1997 | K1 | W WHITE | | 10:32:49 | * |
| 1998 | K2 | D GERMIQUET | W WHITE | 09:52:11 | * |
| 1999 | K1 | D GERMIQUET | | 10:44:42 | |
| 2000 | K2 | D GERMIQUET | W WHITE | 09:42:05 | * |
| 2001 | K1 | A MANFRONI | | 10:18:09 | * |
| 2002 | K2 | J WALDER | A MANFRONI | 09:31:06 | * |
| 2003 | K1 | A MIEDEMA | | 10:12:06 | * |
| 2004 | K2 | A LOMBARD | D KAMSTRA | 09:27:52 | * |
| 2005 | K1 | A MIEDEMA | | 09:36:02 | * |
| 2006 | K2 | A MIEDEMA | A LOMBARD | 09:02:12 | * |
| 2007 | K1 | A MIEDEMA | | 09:25:36 | * |
| 2008 | K2 | A MIEDEMA | A LOMBARD | 08:46:03 | * |
| 2009 | K1 | A MIEDEMA | | 10:18:51 | |
| 2010 | K2 | A MIEDEMA | R KIME | 08:56:04 | |
| 2011 | K1 | R KIME | | 09:37:33 | |
| 2012 | K2 | A ULANSKY | R KIME | 08:41:59 | * |
| 2013 | K1 | R KIME | | 09:07:16 | * |
| 2014 | K2 | A ULANSKY | R KIME | 08:51:19 | |
| 2015 | K1 | L O DONOGHUE | | 09:40:21 | |
| 2016 | K2 | A SOLMS | A ADAMOVA | 09:09:19 | |
| 2017 | K1 | A SOLMS | | 10:16:03 | |
| 2018 | K2 | J PEEK | C PEEK | 09:45:23 | |
| 2019 | K1 | C MACKENZIE | | 10:00:11 | |

Junior Boys
| Year | Class | Overall | | Time | R |
|---|---|---|---|---|---|
| 1961 | | K TRUNDELL | J MASSEY | 17:33:49 | * |
| 1962 | | | | | |
| 1963 | | | | | |
| 1964 | | | | | |
| 1965 | | | | | |
| 1966 | | D HAYTER | R COLLINSON | 19:36:20 | |
| 1967 | | M VAN WIERINGEN | J KEARNEY | 12:41:01 | * |
| 1968 | | | | | |
| 1969 | | R RUDGE | R TODD | 21:40:39 | |
| 1970 | | D CULVERWELL | B BERRIMAN | 14:17:44 | * |
| 1971 | | M TOCKNELL | H SANDBERG | 13:15:39 | * |
| 1972 | | A ALBERTYN | | 12:42:03 | |
| 1973 | | R PENNEFATHER | | 15:35:39 | |
| 1974 | | C ST LEGER | R WIMBUSH | 17:41:36 | |
| 1975 | | C ST LEGER | | 14:14:12 | |
| 1976 | | J TAYLOR | A RENNIE | 11:29:38 | * |
| 1977 | | G DIXON | S DIXON | 13:27:46 | |
| 1978 | | L PARK | | 09:59:22 | * |
| 1979 | | C JAMIESON | S DIXON | 10:25:58 | * |
| 1980 | | | | | |
| 1981 | | R STARR | | 11:34:39 | |
| 1982 | | B YELLAND | | 10:46:44 | |
| 1983 | | B YELLAND | C HACKLAND | 11:01:34 | |
| 1984 | | G ROCKETT | | 12:12:28 | |
| 1985 | | M ELLIS | | 12:59:09 | |
| 1986 | K2 | KJ WHITE | GJ TARR | 09:57:16 | * |
| 1987 | K1 | A HACKLAND | | 10:45:55 | |
| 1988 | K2 | DH RAW | C CARLYLE | 09:51:09 | * |
| 1989 | K1 | W VOLEK | | 09:49:36 | * |
| 1990 | K2 | D REDMAN | D BRAUTESETH | 10:37:53 | |
| 1991 | K1 | G REDMAN | | 09:05:48 | * |
| 1992 | K2 | D BRUSS | E NEL | 09:14:53 | * |
| 1993 | K1 | T MC LAREN | | 11:45:31 | |
| 1994 | K2 | S FISHER | GJ BEHN | 09:48:28 | |
| 1995 | K1 | A STOTT | | 10:10:07 | |
| 1996 | K2 | A STOTT | J CALLISTER | 09:07:09 | * |
| 1997 | K1 | B IRVINE | | 09:12:14 | |
| 1998 | K2 | S BRUSS | S BIGGS | 09:13:56 | |
| 1999 | K1 | L JENKINS JNR | | 09:03:41 | * |
| 2000 | K2 | P TERREBLANCHE | M RASMUSSEN | 08:50:04 | * |
| 2001 | K1 | S RUBENSTEIN | | 08:52:47 | * |
| 2002 | K2 | D WOODHEAD | J BIGGS | 08:52:02 | |
| 2003 | K1 | J BIGGS | | 09:10:38 | |
| 2004 | K2 | D CHAPLIN | M WORRALL | 09:05:02 | |
| 2005 | K1 | N STUBBS | | 09:30:47 | |
| 2006 | K2 | S BIRD | C SCHOEMAN | 08:12:20 | * |
| 2007 | K1 | A BIRKETT | | 09:10:11 | |
| 2008 | K2 | B BIGGS | A BIRKETT | 08:20:36 | |
| 2009 | K1 | K MHLOPHE | | 09:40:15 | |
| 2010 | K2 | G SHUTER | I KRUGER | 08:41:26 | |
| 2011 | K1 | M HAW | | 09:10:59 | |
| 2012 | K2 | M HAW | J SPEED | 08:24:19 | |
| 2013 | K1 | T WILSON | | 08:43:36 | * |
| 2014 | K2 | D STAMP | M CELE | 08:30:55 | |
| 2015 | K1 | A HOUSTON | | 08:53:29 | |
| 2016 | K2 | M ZONDI | M KEELING | 09:37:11 | |
| 2017 | K1 | S LITTLE | | 09:49:48 | |
| 2018 | K2 | H MACKENZIE | D EVANS | 08:49:53 | |
| 2019 | K1 | D EVANS | | 08:35:54 | |

Junior Girls
| Year | Class | Overall | | Time | R |
|---|---|---|---|---|---|
| 1991 | K1 | L OLIVER | | 18:45:22 | * |
| 1992 | K2 | | | | |
| 1993 | K1 | L OLIVER | | 18:40:43 | * |
| 1994 | K2 | K OLIVER | T OETTLE | 20:35:29 | * |
| 1995 | K1 | J BARRINGTON | | 13:47:55 | |
| 1996 | K2 | S JOYCE | E OETTLE | 12:57:25 | * |
| 1997 | K1 | E OETTLE | | 12:25:41 | * |
| 1998 | K2 | | | | |
| 1999 | K1 | C JOYCE | | 12:27:37 | |
| 2000 | K2 | L SYMONS | J COHEN | 11:08:35 | * |
| 2001 | K1 | NJ WOODS | | 13:36:02 | |
| 2002 | K2 | NJ MORPHEW | K MARCH | 11:22:53 | |
| 2003 | K1 | K MARCH | | 11:58:18 | * |
| 2004 | K2 | K CORNISH | C LANGENHOVEN | 11:32:38 | |
| 2005 | K1 | K HOWE | | 13:38:23 | |
| 2006 | K2 | K HOWE | V CHIAZZARI | 11:48:01 | |
| 2007 | K1 | R KIME | | 10:14:54 | * |
| 2008 | K2 | K JOHNSON | L HENDRIE | 14:39:29 | |
| 2009 | K1 | T HAW | | 12:18:35 | |
| 2010 | K2 | T HAW | B PETERSEN | 10:11:49 | * |
| 2011 | K1 | B HAW | | 11:07:59 | |
| 2012 | K2 | B HAW | J PEEK | 09:48:27 | * |
| 2013 | K1 | B HAW | | 09:49:07 | * |
| 2014 | K2 | C PENNEFATHER | C PEEK | 10:36:47 | |
| 2015 | K1 | C PEEK | | 10:10:48 | |
| 2016 | K2 | C PEEK | K PURCHASE | 09:43:51 | * |
| 2017 | K1 | C MACKENZIE | | 11:05:50 | |
| 2018 | K2 | C MACKENZIE | A PECKETT | 10:33:06 | |
| 2019 | K1 | A PECKETT | | 10:29:37 | |

== See also ==
- Sport in South Africa
- Msunduzi River
- Mgeni River
- Graeme Pope-Ellis
