= Msunduzi River =

River in South Africa

Coordinates: 29°37′14″S 30°40′36″E

Msunduzi Dusi, Umsinduzi
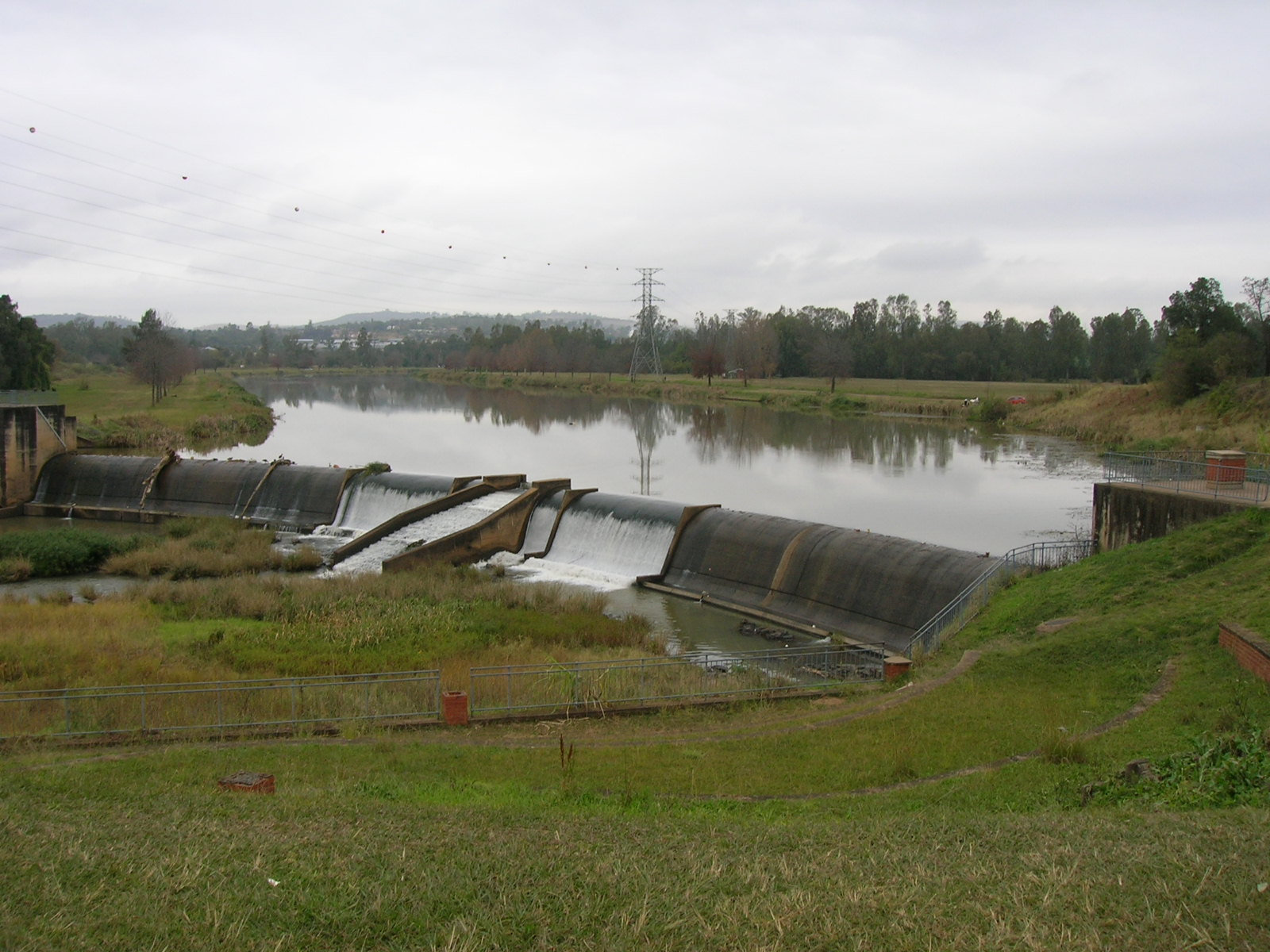
- The weir creating the Camps Drift section of the Msunduzi, in Pietermaritzburg. This dammed section is used for canoe and rowing practice, and is the starting point of the Dusi Canoe Marathon.

Location
- Country: South Africa
- Province: KwaZulu-Natal
- City: Pietermaritzburg

Physical characteristics
- Mouth: Mngeni River

The Msunduzi River is a river in KwaZulu-Natal, South Africa. It is also known by its anglicised name, the Dusi River. The original name, Msunduzi, is isiZulu.

The Msunduzi is a tributary of the Mngeni River.

== In Pietermaritzburg ==
The Msunduzi passes through the centre of Pietermaritzburg, the provincial capital. A portion of the river within the city has been dammed by weirs, and is used for canoeing and rowing practice. This section, known as Camp's Drift, has also been proposed for potential development of a sporting and office complex, including an olympic standard canoe slalom course.

The Msunduzi Municipality, to which Pietermaritzburg belongs, takes its name from the river.

== Dusi Canoe Marathon ==
The Dusi Canoe Marathon is an annual canoe marathon from Pietermaritzburg to Durban, which starts on the Msunduzi, and ends on the Mngeni. The race attracts around 2000 paddlers, and receives national media coverage in South Africa. The race first began in 1951.

== Problems with water quality ==
In the Pietermaritzburg region, the river occasionally contains counts of E. coli bacteria as high as 50 000 per 100 ml. This results in a fairly high incidence (64% of respondents in one survey) of health issues in canoeists using the river. These include diarrhea (colloquially known as "Dusi guts"), as well as eye and ear infections, and septic cuts. The poor quality of water is believed to be caused by sewers near the river overflowing during heavy rains, and illegal dumping. These health risks threaten the annual canoe marathon. In effective terms, the water quality of the Msunduzi river is undesirable and can pose as a serious health threat for those who brave its waters.

An NGO, the Duzi-Umgeni Conservation Trust (DUCT), has been set up to coordinate projects aimed at improving water quality, and conserving the regions around the river. (DUCT were responsible for the above-mentioned figures). Following DUCT lobbying, the Msunduzi District Municipality has commenced on a 10 million rand (SA currency) program to repair and improve the sewage system in 2016. DUCT is also testing trash nets as a means of catching and removing illegally dumped trash.
