= The Wykeham Collegiate =

Location
- Pietermaritzburg, KwaZulu-Natal; South Africa; 29°36′S 30°21′E

Information
- Type: Private, Boarding
- Motto: Forward In Faith
- Established: 1990
- Locale: Suburban
- Grades: Grade RRR - 12
- Enrollment: 740 girls
- Colors: Blue, White and Yellow
- Fees: For information about current school fees please visit - www.twc.org.za/school-fees/
- Website: www.twc.org.za

The Wykeham Collegiate (TWC) is a private girls' school situated in Clarendon, Pietermaritzburg, KwaZulu-Natal, South Africa. The name is a combination of the two schools from which it was amalgamated. The first, Wykeham School, was founded in 1905 by Mary Moore and the second, Girls’ Collegiate School, founded by Mary Campbell in 1878. The new school opened on 1 January 1990.

== School profile ==
The school is regarded as one of the leading schools in South Africa. The Lady Principal is Susan Tasker.

The school caters for Grade RRR through to Grade 12. In the Junior School, the youngest Grade RRR and Grade R girls are known as Poppets and Sprigs respectively and all Grade 7 girls, as the role models for the younger children, are monitors - they assume leadership positions.

The school caters for Day Scholars and Boarders, with boarding facilities offered from Grade 3 upwards. Enrolment stands at approximately 656 students, with class size restricted to 25 pupils in the Senior School. While the Junior School has an average of two classes per grade, the Senior School has three. Pupils are drawn not only from South Africa, but as far afield as England, Germany, South Korea, UAE, China, Tanzania, Malawi, Kenya, Zambia, Botswana, Swaziland and Mozambique.

Music is an important component of the school with the Music School offering tuition in a variety of instruments ranging from recorder, violin, flute, clarinet, saxophone, drums, piano and voice. The Junior and Senior Wind ensembles provide music at functions in the school as well as playing in concerts around the country. Visual Art is offered to Grade 12 level as is Dramatic Art.

Sport and Exercise Science has now become an officially recognised Independent Examinations Board (IEB) Grade 12 subject and TWC is one of only a few schools in South Africa offering this subject. Apart from the academic requirements of the course, the girls can also become qualified coaches in several sports offered at The Wykeham Collegiate and the course includes the ‘Learn to Swim’ Course, through Swim SA, to qualify as a Swimming Coach, various Coaching Certificates, First Aid courses, Injury and Strapping courses and other sports related courses

== Sport ==
Sports offered include hockey (field and indoor), netball, basketball, swimming, tennis, squash, water polo, canoe polo, athletics, cross country, soccer, canoeing and boot camp. School teams are coached by qualified sports professionals and TWC girls have represented South Africa in swimming, hockey and canoeing. Many girls have also represented their region and province in various sporting disciplines.

== Notable alumnae ==
- Khanyi Dhlomo, TV host and chief executive
- Nina Myskow, journalist and television personality
- Mbali Ntuli, politician
