= Pietermaritzburg =

Capital city of KwaZulu-Natal, South Africa

Pietermaritzburg uMgungundlovu (Zulu)
- City
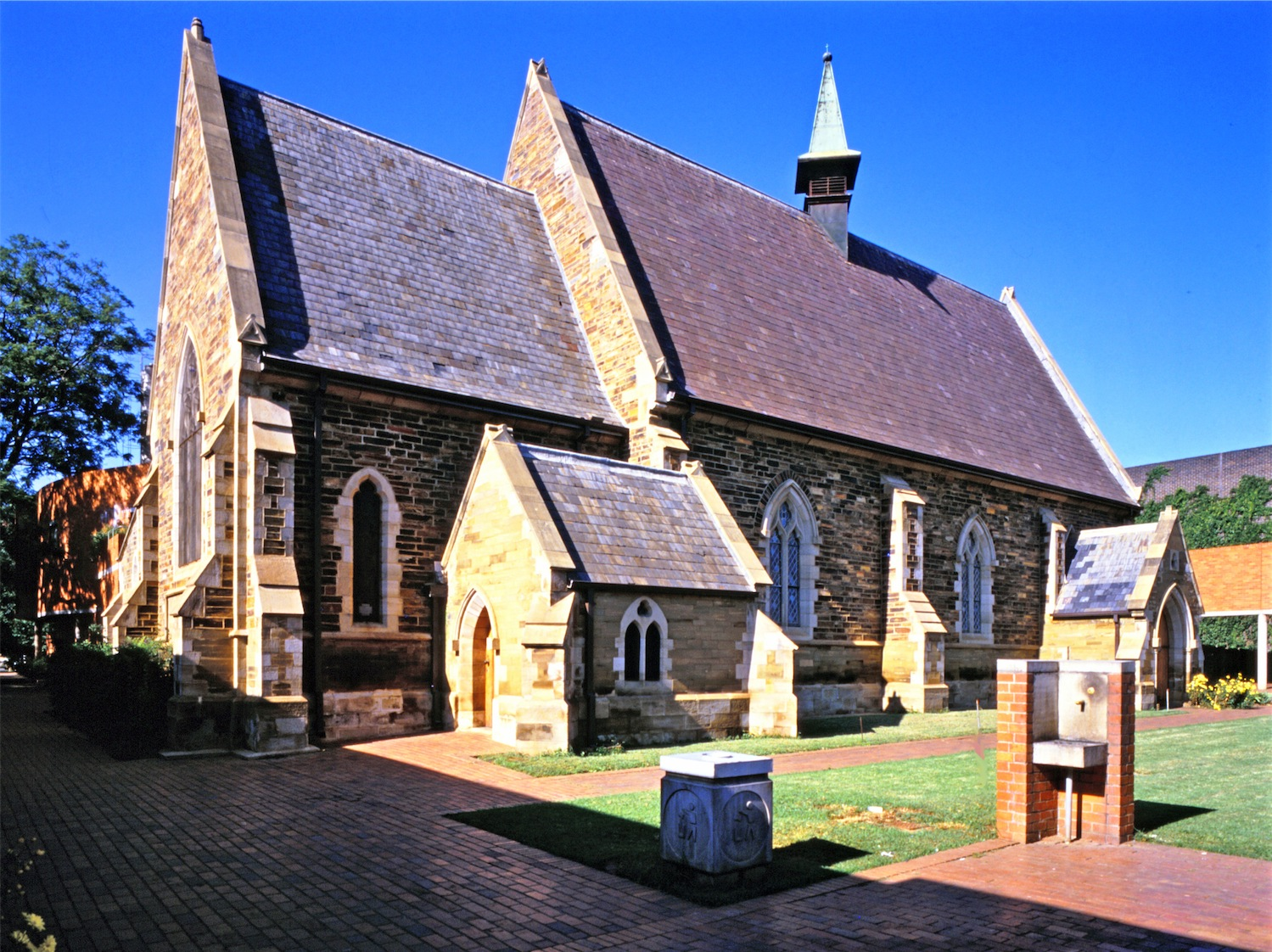
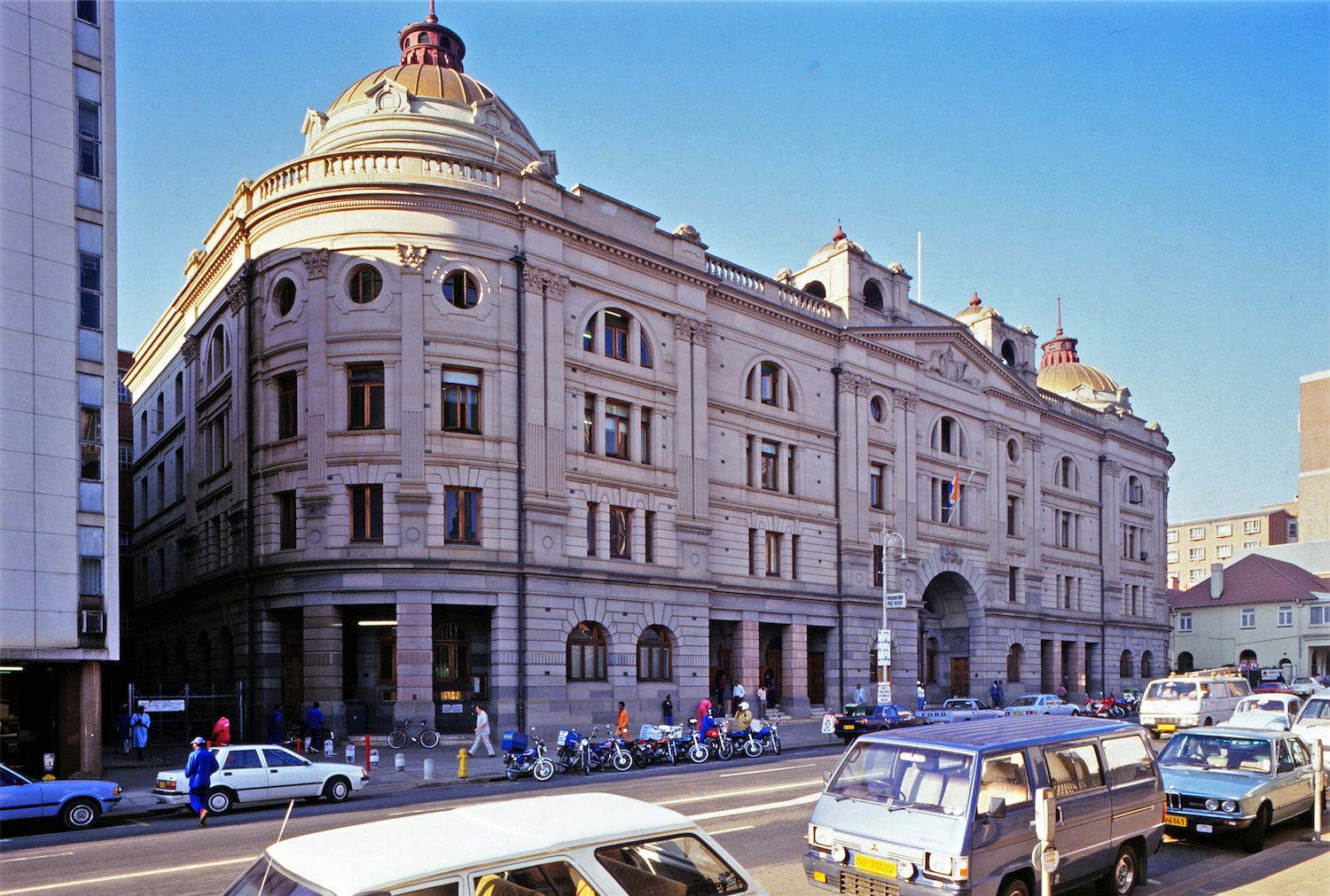
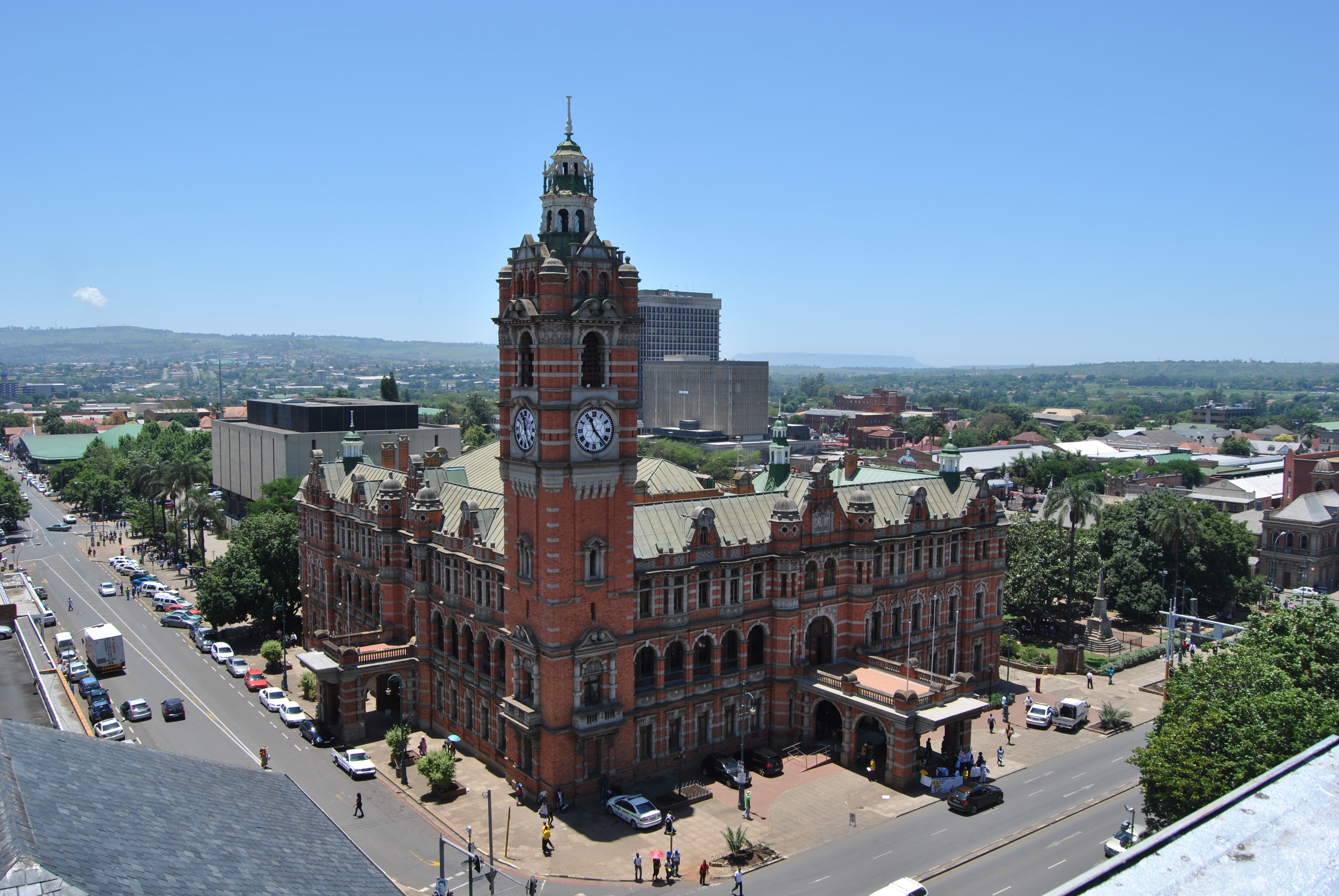
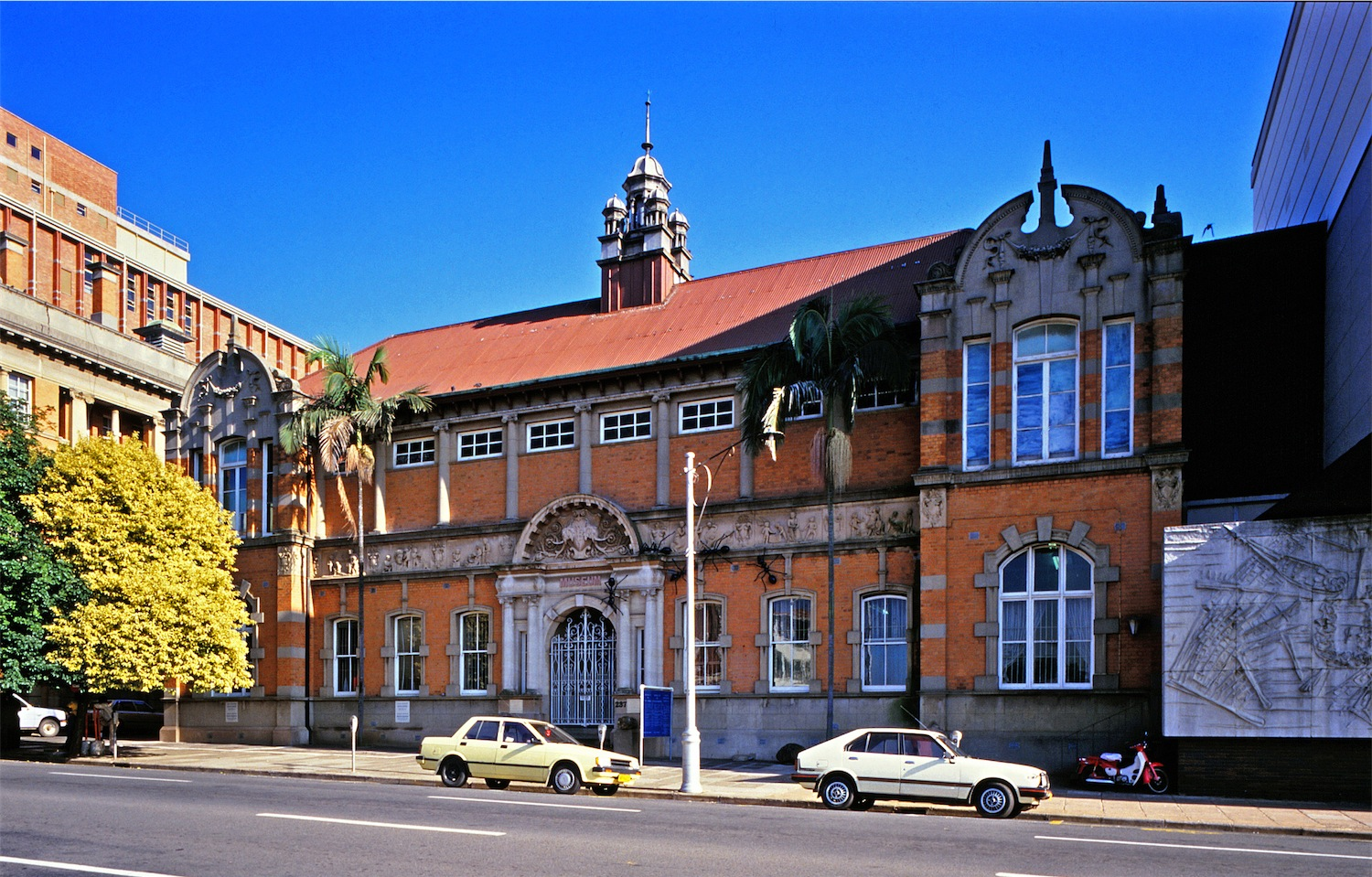
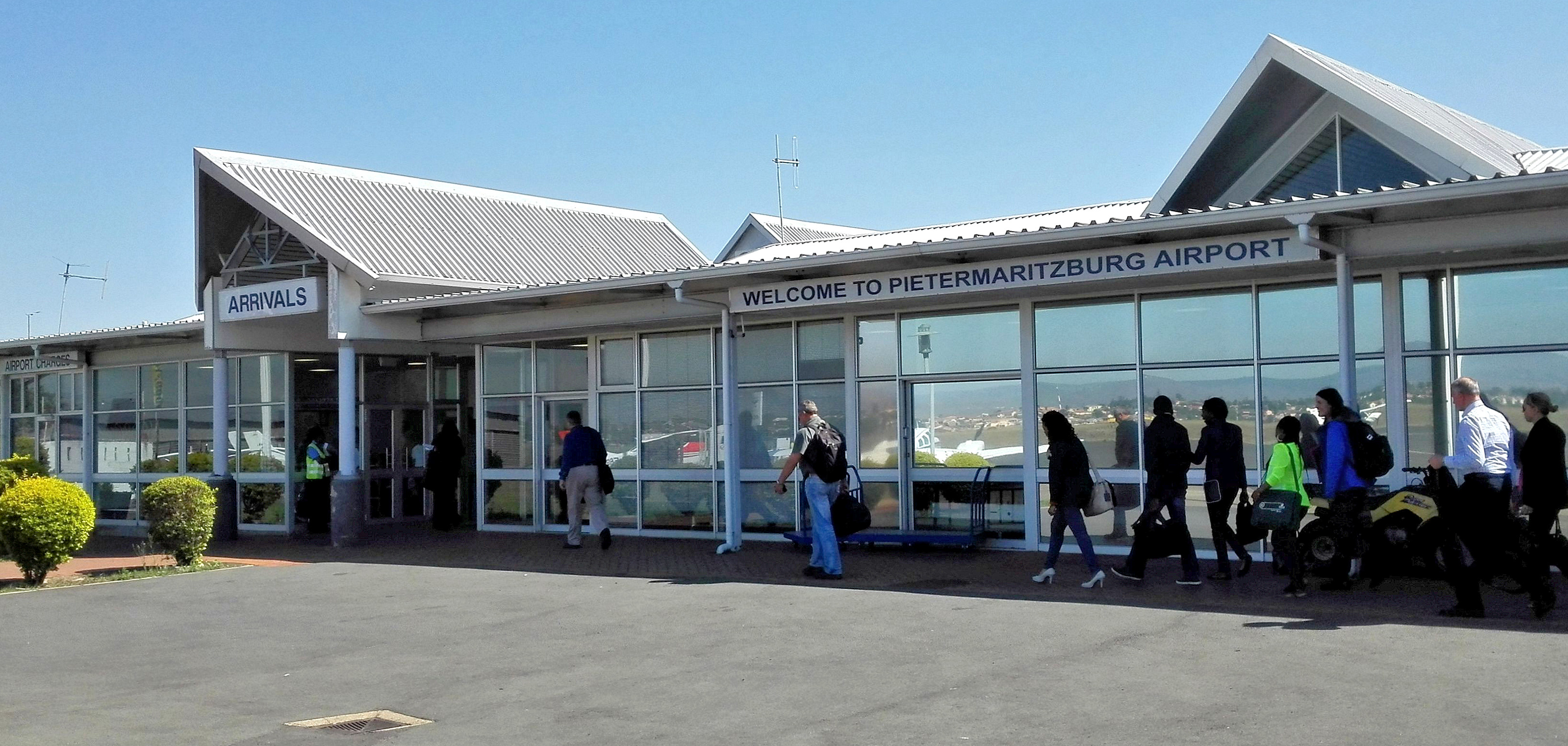
- From top, left to right: St. Peter's Church, Post Office, City Hall, Kwa-Zulu Natal Museum, Airport
- Nicknames: PMB, Maritzburg, Mirichbhag (Bhojpuri)
- Location within KwaZulu-Natal Location within South Africa Location within Africa
- Coordinates: 29°37′S 30°23′E
- Country: South Africa
- Province: KwaZulu-Natal
- District: uMgungundlovu
- Municipality: Msunduzi
- Established: 1839

Government
  - Type: Local Municipality
  - Mayor: Mzimkhulu Thebolla (2019) (ANC)

Area
  - City: 126.15 km^{2} (48.71 sq mi)
- Elevation: 596 m (1,955 ft)

Population (2011)
  - City: 223,448
  - Estimate (2026): 584,702
  - Rank: 7th in South Africa; 6th (Agglomeration)
  - Density: 1,771.3/km^{2} (4,587.6/sq mi)
  - Urban: 923,341

Racial makeup (2011)
  - Black African: 70.0%
  - White: 14.2%
  - Indian/Asian: 8.4%
  - Coloured: 6.9%
  - Other: 0.3%

First languages (2011)
  - Zulu: 57.0%
  - English: 28.9%
  - Afrikaans: 4.2%
  - Xhosa: 3.5%
  - Other: 6.3%
- Time zone: UTC+2 (SAST)
- Postal code (street): 3201
- PO box: 3200
- Area code: 033
- Website: www.msunduzi.gov.za

Pietermaritzburg (/ˌpiːtərˈmærɪtsbɜːrɡ/; Zulu: uMgungundlovu) is the capital and second-largest city in the province of KwaZulu-Natal, South Africa, after Durban. It was named in 1838 and is currently governed by the Msunduzi Local Municipality.

The city is named uMgungundlovu in Zulu, after King Dingane's royal homestead. Pietermaritzburg is popularly called Maritzburg and is often informally abbreviated to PMB. It is a regionally important industrial hub, producing aluminium, timber and dairy products, and is the main economic hub of uMgungundlovu District Municipality. The public sector is a major employer in the city due to local, district and provincial government offices located here.

The city has many schools and tertiary education institutions, including a campus of the University of KwaZulu-Natal.

== History ==
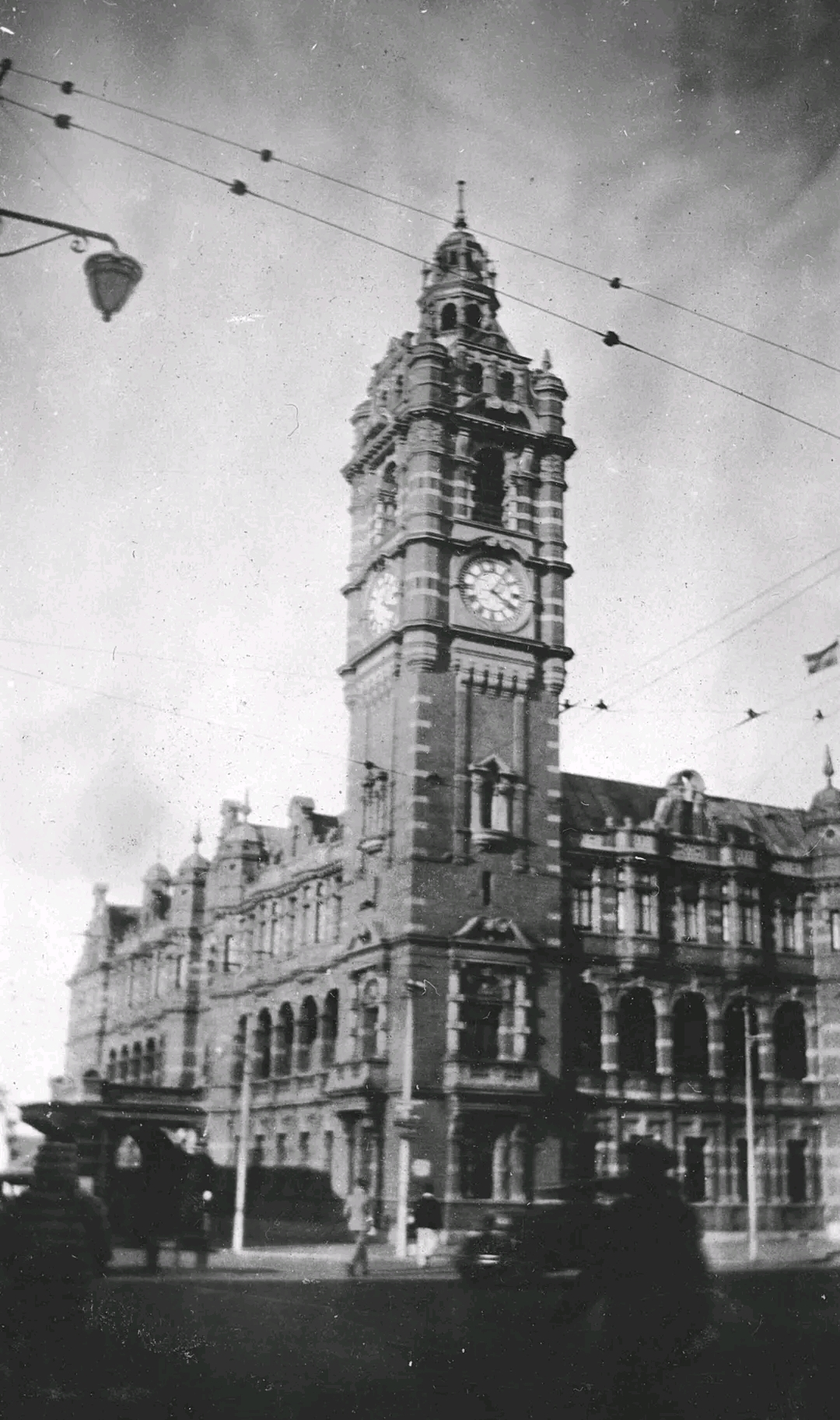
Pietermaritzburg City Hall found on a photo album dated 1924

The city was occupied by Voortrekkers, in April 1838 following the murder of Piet Retief and his seventy-strong party at the Zulu Capital, Mgungundlovu (6 February 1838), when seeking land to settle around Port Natal (The Natal-Land Treaty), and from where the reprisal Wenkommando departed (November 1838) to defeat Dingane at the Battle of Blood River (16 December 1838). Pietermaritzburg is approximately 160 km (100 mi) direct from the Zulu capital, Mgungundlovu.

Prior to the battle (9 December 1838) a vow was taken that if the Boers were granted victory over the Zulu, then a sacred church would be built which still stands today, The Church of the Vow. It was Jan Gerritze Bantjes, Secretary General to Andries Pretorius, Commander of the campaign who arranged the financing of the church by the Boer towns folk which by then had taken a low priority after the war.

The town grew rapidly to become the capital of the short-lived Boer republic of Natalia. Britain took over Pietermaritzburg in 1843 and it became the seat of the Natal Colony's administration with the first lieutenant-governor, Martin West, making it his home. Fort Napier, named after the governor of the Cape Colony, Sir George Thomas Napier, was built to house a garrison. In 1893, Natal received responsibility for its own government, and an assembly building was built along with the city hall.

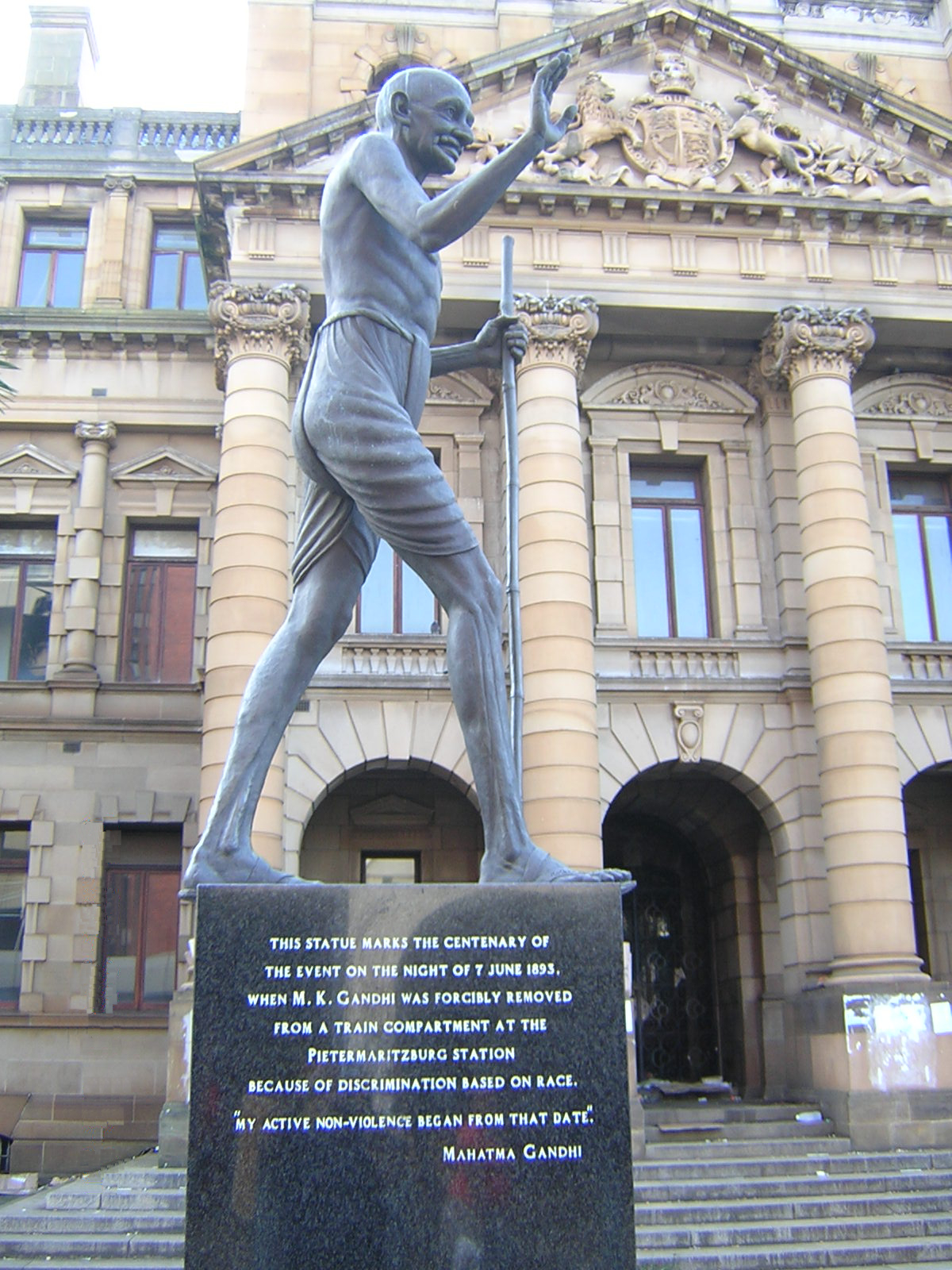
Bronze statue of Gandhi commemorating the centenary of the incident at the Pietermaritzburg Railway Station, unveiled by Archbishop Desmond Tutu on Church Street, Pietermaritzburg, in June 1993

On 1 June 1893, while the young Mahatma Gandhi was on his way to Pretoria, a white man objected to Gandhi's presence in a first-class carriage. Despite Gandhi having a first-class ticket, he was ordered by the conductor to move to the van compartment at the end of the train: he refused, and he was removed from the train at Pietermaritzburg.

Shivering through the winter night in the waiting room of the station, Gandhi made the momentous decision to stay on in South Africa and fight the racial discrimination against Indians there. Out of that struggle emerged his unique version of nonviolent resistance, Satyagraha. Today, a bronze statue of Gandhi stands in Church Street, in the city center.

In 1910, when the Union of South Africa was formed, Natal became a province of the Union, and Pietermaritzburg became one of the capitals of the country. During apartheid, the city was segregated into various sections. 90% of the Indian population was moved to the suburb of Northdale while most of its Zulu inhabitants were moved to the neighbouring township of Edendale and white inhabitants were moved out of those areas.

=== Name ===
There exist two interpretations about the origin of the city's name. One is that it was named after Piet Retief (Pieter Mauritz Retief) and Gerrit Maritz (Gerhardus Marthinus Maritz), two Voortrekker leaders. The other is that it was originally named after Piet Retief's full name alone. In this interpretation the original name was "Pieter Mauritz' Burg", later transliterated to the current name. In 1938, the city announced officially that the second element Maritz should also honour Gert Maritz.

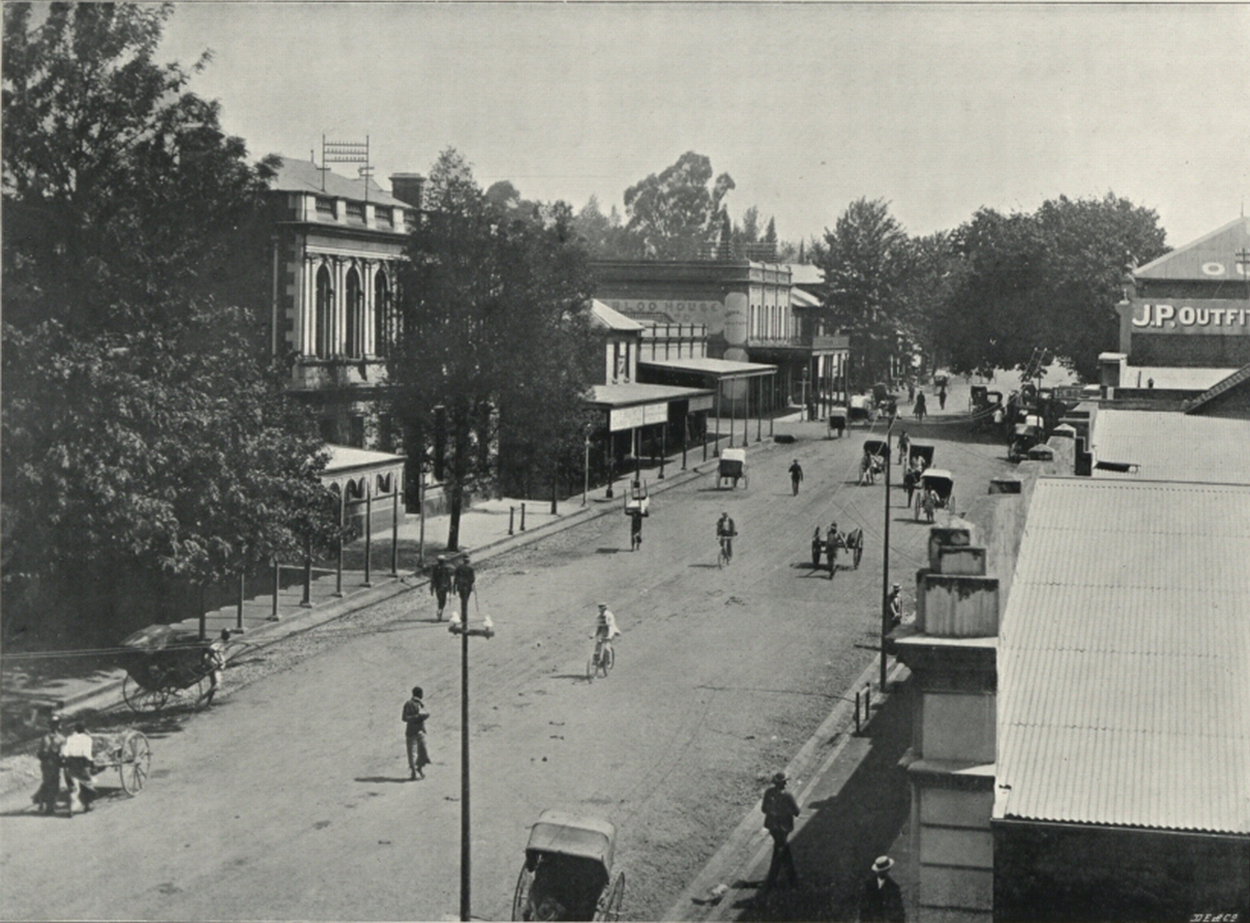
A view of Church Street in central Pietermaritzburg, c. 1900

In fact, neither Retief nor Maritz ever reached Pietermaritzburg. Retief was killed by Dingane, successor to Shaka, king of the Zulus. Maritz died of illness on 23 September 1838 near the present-day town of Estcourt, some eighty kilometres northwest of Pietermaritzburg, after the battle with the Zulus at Bloukranz.

At the time of the rise of the Zulu Empire, the site that was to become Pietermaritzburg was called uMgungundlovu. That is popularly translated from the Zulu as "Place of the Elephant" although it could also be translated to mean "The elephant wins".

Umgungundlovu is thus thought to be the site of some Zulu king's victory since "Elephant" (Indlovu) is a name traditionally taken by the Zulu monarch. Legend has it that Shaka had his warriors hunt elephant there to sell the ivory to English traders at Durban (then called Port Natal). Today, the town is still called by its Voortrekker name although the municipality of which it is part bears the Zulu name.

=== Education ===
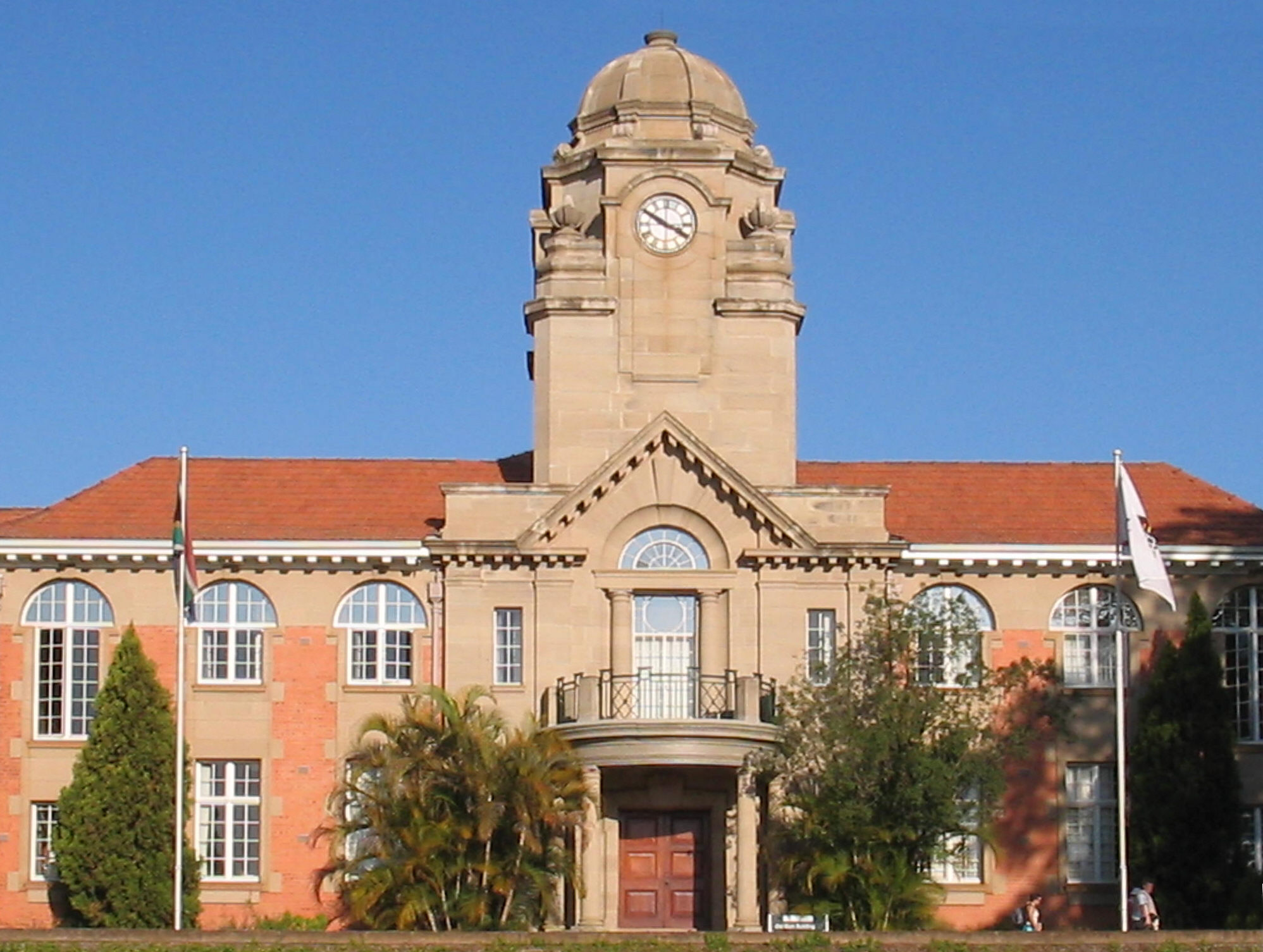
Clock tower of the university's Collin Webb Hall

The University of Natal was founded in 1910. In 1922 the university extended to Durban. The two campuses were incorporated into the University of Natal in March 1949. It became a major voice in the struggle against apartheid and was one of the first universities in the country to provide education to African students. It became the University of KwaZulu-Natal on 1 January 2004.

== Capital status ==
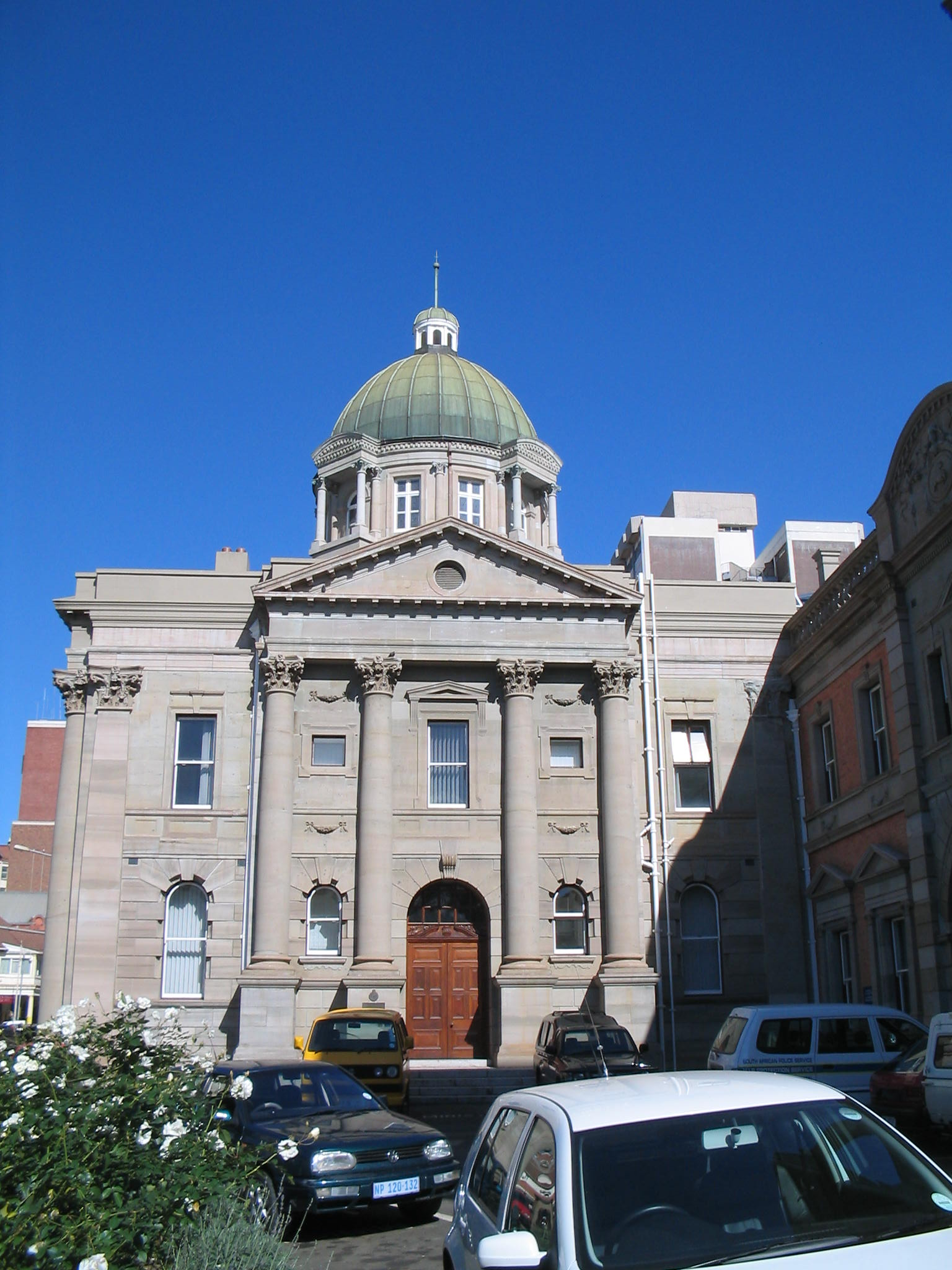
The KwaZulu-Natal Legislature building

Pietermaritzburg was the capital of the Colony of Natal until 1910, when the Union of South Africa was formed, and Natal became a province of the Union. Prior to 1994, Pietermaritzburg was the capital of Natal Province. Following the first post-apartheid elections in South Africa, as a result of which the Inkatha Freedom Party won a majority in the KwaZulu-Natal provincial government, Pietermaritzburg shared its status as capital of the (then newly created) province of KwaZulu-Natal with Ulundi. Pietermaritzburg became the legislative capital of the new province, while Ulundi became the administrative capital.

The IFP, being strongly Zulu nationalist, desired that Ulundi, the capital of the Zulu Kingdom at the time of its fall to the British in the Anglo-Zulu War, be the post-apartheid capital of the province. Ulundi had also been the capital of the bantustan KwaZulu, which makes up a portion of modern KwaZulu-Natal. However, Ulundi severely lacked the infrastructure to be an effective seat of government, and the African National Congress (ANC) and the Democratic Party, the two other strong political parties in the province, among others, called for Pietermaritzburg alone to be the capital.

The debate came to an end when the ANC came to power in the province in 2004, and named Pietermaritzburg the sole capital of KwaZulu-Natal. This has resulted in the relocation of several government offices to Pietermaritzburg, an action that has generally been welcomed as a positive development for the region. Since 2004, progress such as the modernisation of several buildings in the city centre and a proliferation of retail and housing developments in the suburbs are results of recent investment in the city by both the public and private sectors.

== Economy ==
Until the late 1990s, the region was renowned for the production of high-quality textile, clothing and footwear products. An example of the latter included the production of Doc Marten shoes. However, these industries have declined in the area due to lower production costs in Asia. Extensive timber plantations and numerous citrus farms surround the city, contributing a significant share of the city's output.

The Liberty Group has made major investments in several phases in the region since 2002 with the development of the Liberty Midlands Mall (the area's largest shopping centre by gross lettable area and its most prestigious) and Stay Easy hotel. Hulett's Aluminium and Willowton cooking oil contributes a substantial part of the region's industrial output.

Pietermaritzburg is also the city where major South African pizza franchise Debonairs Pizza was founded in 1991.

== Coat of arms ==
The Pietermaritzburg borough council assumed a coat of arms in 1861. The shield depicted an elephant standing on grass, and a cross of five stars was placed above the shield. The motto was Umgungunhlovu. It is unclear what the original colours were, but by 1910, the shield had been coloured blue. By 1931, the council had approved new artwork in which the stars were placed on a radiant sun.

The arms were registered with the Natal Provincial Administration in November 1950. Many early renditions of the coat of arms, visible on older public building and wrought iron lampposts, features an elephant which is clearly an Asian elephant rather than an African elephant. More recent versions reflect an African elephant.

The final version of the arms was granted by the College of Arms in May 1961. It was registered at the Bureau of Heraldry in May 1973. The blazon was Per fess Azure and Vert, over all an elephant statant Or, tusked Argent (i.e. the shield was divided horizontally into blue over green, and displayed a gold elephant with silver tusks). The crest was changed to a blue sun displaying gold and silver stars, and two black wildebeest were added as supporters. Each had a shield on its shoulder, the dexter supporter's shield displaying the Union Jack and the sinister supporter's the flag of the Natalia republic.

== Transport ==
=== Road ===
Pietermaritzburg is on the N3 highway, the primary route between the harbour city of Durban, some 90 kilometres (56 mi) away, and the Pretoria-Witwatersrand-Vereeniging conurbation.

The R33 connects Pietermaritzburg with Greytown and Paulpietersburg, while the R56 connects Pietermaritzburg with Ixopo and Kokstad.

=== Air ===
The city is served by Pietermaritzburg Airport, which has regular scheduled services to OR Tambo International Airport in Johannesburg. There are 4 flights to Johannesburg and 4 return flights daily, with a reduced number of weekend flights. It once operated flights to Cape Town International Airport in Cape Town – this route was terminated in 2019.

=== Rail ===
Pietermaritzburg Railway Station is served by long-distance trains on the Durban-Johannesburg and Durban-Cape Town routes of Shosholoza Meyl.

It has been proposed that the Metrorail commuter rail system be expanded from Cato Ridge to Pietermaritzburg.

=== Bus ===
The Pietermaritzburg Municipality historically operated a tram service, which was closed down in the 1940s, and a bus service, which was closed down in the 1980s.

Nowadays regular daily bus services connect Pietermaritzburg to other major cities in South Africa. The bus station is located on Burger Street, opposite the McDonalds Centre, and it serves major bus companies. Greyhound and Intercape are the most reliable and they operate several round-trips from Durban to Johannesburg daily, where Pietermaritzburg is the second to last stop before Durban.

=== Taxis ===
Pietermaritzburg has two types of taxi services: metered taxis and minibus taxis. Unlike in many cities, metered taxis are not allowed to drive around the city to solicit fares and instead must be called and ordered to a specific location. A number of companies service Pietermaritzburg and surrounding areas. These taxis can also be called upon for airport transfers, point to point pickups and shuttles.

Minibus taxis are the standard mode of transport for the majority of the population who cannot afford private vehicles.

=== Integrated Rapid Public Transport (IRPT) ===
A bus rapid transit system, the initial phase of which would connect Endendale to Northdale, was planned. Construction however has halted and the project has stalled, with no word on when it will resume.

== Geography ==
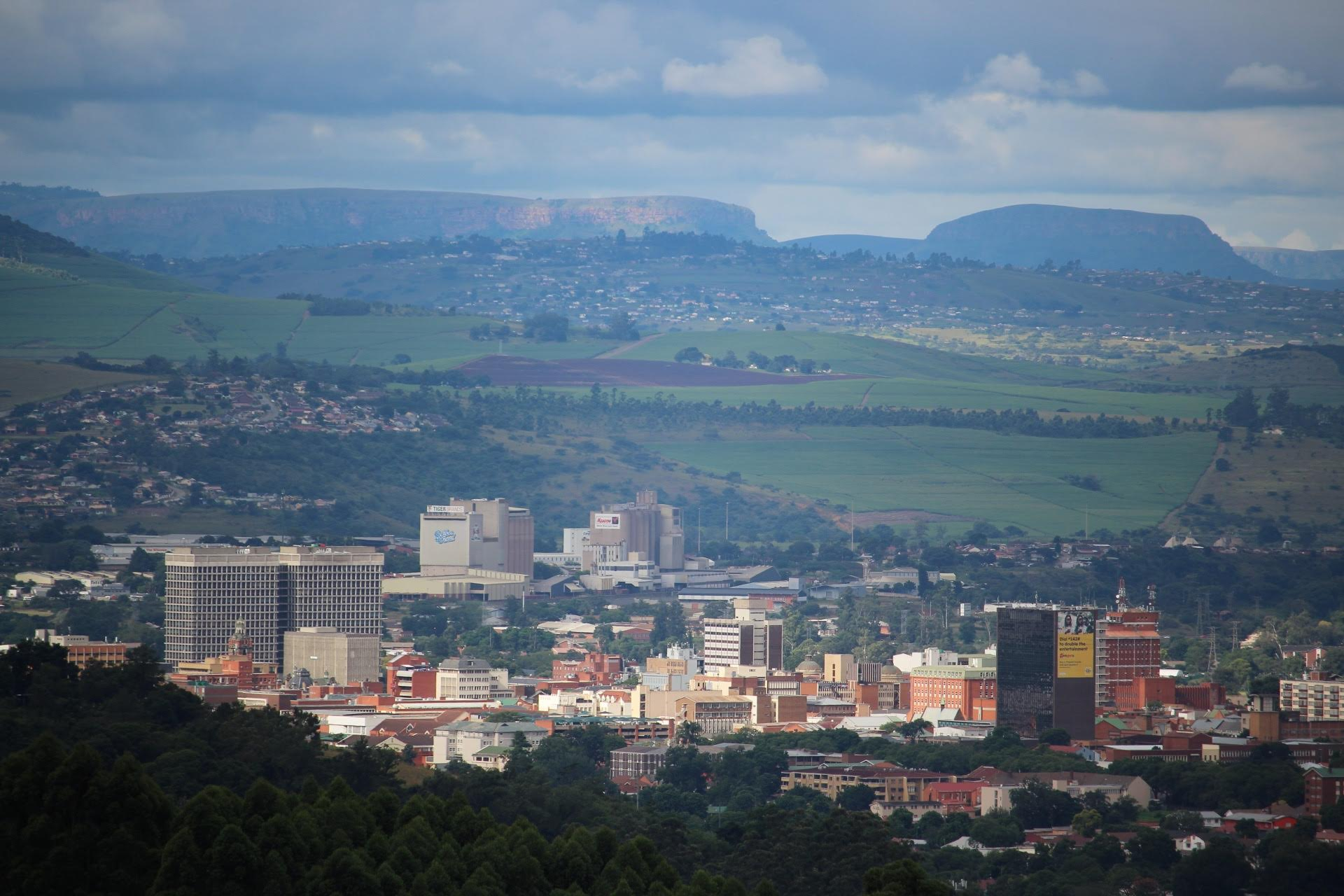
An overview of Pietermaritzburg's business district seen from the hills of the suburb of Blackridge

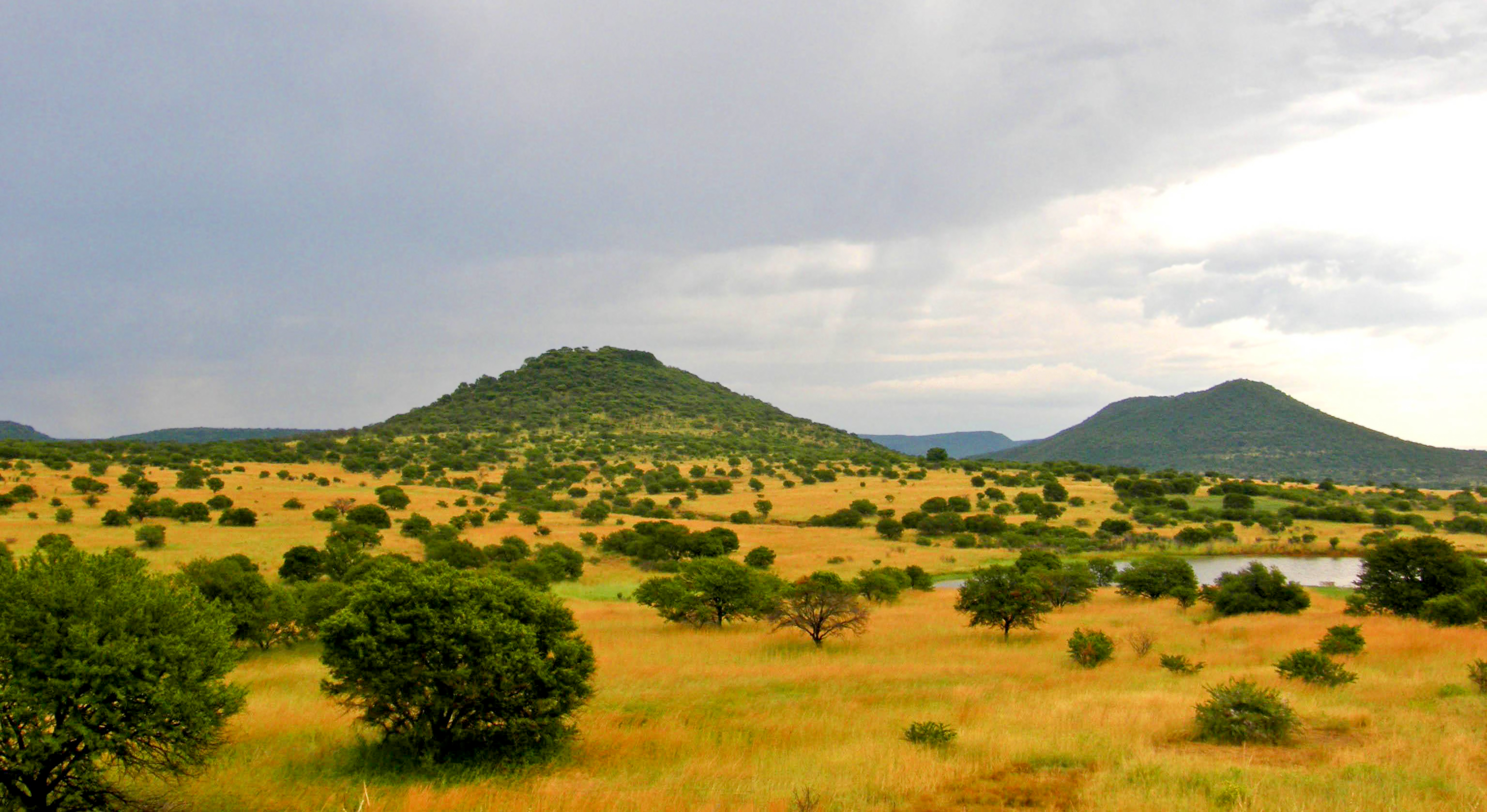
Upland savanna near Pietermaritzburg

=== Climate ===
Pietermaritzburg has a dry-winter humid subtropical climate (Köppen climate classification: Cwa). Summers are warm and occasionally hot, with frequent rainfall. Winters are dry with high diurnal temperature variation, with light air frosts being possible.

Climate data for Pietermaritzburg
Month	Jan	Feb	Mar	Apr	May	Jun	Jul	Aug	Sep	Oct	Nov	Dec	Year
Record high °C (°F)	41 (106)	39 (102)	38 (100)	37 (99)	37 (99)	31 (88)	32 (90)	35 (95)	39 (102)	40 (104)	41 (106)	42 (108)	42 (108)
Mean daily maximum °C (°F)	28 (82)	28 (82)	28 (82)	26 (79)	24 (75)	22 (72)	23 (73)	24 (75)	25 (77)	25 (77)	26 (79)	28 (82)	26 (79)
Mean daily minimum °C (°F)	18 (64)	17 (63)	16 (61)	12 (54)	7 (45)	3 (37)	3 (37)	6 (43)	10 (50)	13 (55)	15 (59)	16 (61)	11 (52)
Record low °C (°F)	9 (48)	10 (50)	5 (41)	1 (34)	−1 (30)	−4 (25)	−4 (25)	−3 (27)	−1 (30)	2 (36)	5 (41)	6 (43)	−4 (25)
Average precipitation mm (inches)	155 (6.1)	121 (4.8)	113 (4.4)	44 (1.7)	30 (1.2)	13 (0.5)	2 (0.1)	8 (0.3)	64 (2.5)	74 (2.9)	100 (3.9)	108 (4.3)	832 (32.8)
Average precipitation days	22	16	15	6	5	3	1	2	10	12	15	16	123
Source: South African Weather Service

== Sport ==
- Pietermaritzburg is home to the oldest football (soccer) club of South Africa and the African continent: Savages FC PMB, founded in 1882.
- The Comrades Marathon takes place annually in June between Pietermaritzburg and Durban. It has been run since 1921 and attracts thousands of entrants. The start of the race alternates between the two cities.
- Between December 1953 and November 1981, Pietermaritzburg had an international standard motor racing circuit located on the outskirts of the city. The Roy Hesketh Circuit measured 2.902 kilometres (1.803 mi). The circuit was named after South African driver Roy Hesketh. During its period of operation it hosted rounds of the South African National Drivers Championship, the Springbok Series and national Formula Atlantic races. The circuit was also like a second home to Mike Hailwood. The track was known for hosting the Easter races as well – a festival of racing over three days. The expansion of the town of Pietermaritzburg eventually led to the redevelopment of the site as a residential and business zone after racing ceased at the end of 1981. The section from Henry's Knee to the top of Beacon still exists, and is undergoing protection from further development as an important piece of Pietermaritzburg's history. From 1948 until 1953 races were held at the 5.5-kilometre (3.4 mi) Alexandra Park Street Circuit on streets within the town of Pietermaritzburg.
- Former Springbok and World Cup Winner Joel Stransky was born in Pietermaritzburg on 16 July 1967, he matriculated from Maritzburg College.
- Former South African Cricketer Jonty Rhodes was born in Pietermaritzburg in 1969. He attended Merchiston Prep school and later matriculated from Maritzburg College.
- The English cricketer Kevin Pietersen was born in Pietermaritzburg, as was Springbok cricketer Cuan McCarthy.
- The yearly Amashovashova is a 106 km (66 mi) road cycling classic race held since 1986 which starts in Pietermartizburg and finishes in Durban. It is normally held in October.
- South African cricketer David Miller was born in Pietermaritzburg on in 1989.
- In 2010, the BMX Racing World Championship took place in the city of Pietermaritzburg between 15 July and 1 August.
- In January there is an annual canoe race, the Dusi Canoe Marathon, from Pietermaritzburg to Durban. The route follows the Msunduzi River into the Mgeni River, through the Valley of a Thousand Hills into the Inanda Dam and from here to the mouth of the Mgeni River.
- The Midmar Mile is one of the largest open-water swimming events in the world; taking place at Midmar Dam, north of Pietermaritzburg in February every year, it attracts over 16,000 swimmers from around the world.
- The Harry Gwala Stadium is a multi-purpose stadium, and is mostly used for football matches. Until 2023, it was used by Maritzburg United, after which it was reserved for Royal AM.
- The Pietermaritzburg Msunduzi Athletics Stadium is currently being developed.
- The Pietermaritzburg Oval is considered one of the most picturesque cricket grounds in South Africa, and it hosted two matches during the 2003 Cricket World Cup.
- Pietermaritzburg cricket ground is notable as one of the two grounds used regularly for first-class cricket that have a tree within the boundary (the other is St Lawrence Ground in Canterbury, Kent).
- Woodburn Stadium is currently used for most club rugby in Pietermaritzburg.
- The Kershaw Park Tennis Complex is a tennis stadium.
- The above facilities form the centre of the Pietermaritzburg sports precinct.

== Tourism ==
Some of the area's tourist attractions include; the KwaZulu-Natal Museum, City Hall, Colonial Buildings, Imperial Hotel, Comrades House and SANBI Botanical Gardens.

Attractions in the surrounding areas include; Albert Falls Nature Reserve, Howick Falls, Midmar Public Nature Reserve, Queens Elizabeth Park and World's View.

== Education ==
=== Schools ===
- Alexandra High School
- Carter High School (South Africa)
- Cordwalles Preparatory School
- Epworth School
- Hilton College
- Michaelhouse
- Maritzburg College
- Merchiston Preparatory School
- Pietermaritzburg Girls' High School
- Russell High School
- St. Charles College, Pietermaritzburg
- St. John's Diocesan School for Girls
- St. Nicholas Diocesan School
- The Wykeham Collegiate

=== Tertiary institutions ===
Pietermaritzburg has a well-developed higher system of public universities. Pietermaritzburg is served by two public universities, University of KwaZulu-Natal and Durban University of Technology. There are also many private and public colleges operating in the city, such as Varsity College.

== Civil society ==
Pietermaritzburg is home to a number of prominent civil society organisations including the Abahlali baseMjondolo (shackdwellers) movement, GroundWork, CINDI, PACSA, and the KwaZulu Natal Christian Council.

== Notable people ==
- Don Armand, rugby player (born 1988)
- Neil Adcock, Springbok cricketer and radio cricket commentator
- Cade Carmichael, Irish cricketer (born 2002)
- Arthur Bartman, (1972–2019), Premier Soccer League goalkeeper
- Dale Benkenstein, former cricketer
- Kork Ballington, World 250cc and 350cc Motorcycle Champion
- Melissa Carlton, Paralympic swimmer who represented Australia
- Amod Cassimjee, one of the earliest known Indian settlers
- Pat Cilliers, rugby player (born 1987)
- Brendon Dedekind, swimmer (born 1976)
- Bathabile Dlamini, leader of the African National Congress Women's League and Minister of Women in the Presidency, and Minister of Social Development (born 1962)
- Jon Ekerold, world 350cc motorcycle champion
- Sarel Erwee, South Africa national cricket team player. Attended St. Charles College, Pietermaritzburg.
- Brett Evans, (born 1982) South African Football (soccer) player; attended Merchiston Preparatory School and Maritzburg College and played for Maritzburg City as an amateur
- Adrian Furnham (born 1953), British-based organisational and applied psychologist and academic
- Hayden Griffin (1943–2013), British stage designer
- Tim Groenewald, Derbyshire and Warwickshire Cricketer (born 1984)
- Archie Gumede, leader of the United Democratic Front (South Africa) and Member of the Parliament of South Africa
- Adam Habib, vice-chancellor and principal of the University of the Witwatersrand (born 1965)
- Jonathan Handley (born 1954), singer-songwriter, originally from Springs, founder of The Radio Rats; 1979 hit single "ZX Dan" on Radio 5 (now 5FM)
- Bessie Head (born 1937), writer, born in Pietermaritzburg
- Roy Hesketh (1915–1944), racing driver and South African Air Force pilot.
- Butch James, Springbok and Sharks rugby player; attended Maritzburg College from 1994 to 1996
- Stratford Johns (1925–2002), British actor
- Peter Johnstone (born 1970), left PMB in 2004
- Craig Joubert (born 1977), international rugby union referee; attended Merchiston Preparatory School and Maritzburg College
- Guy Kewney (1946–2010), technology journalist
- Jesse Kriel (born 1994), Springbok rugby player; attended Merchiston Preparatory School and Maritzburg College
- Charlie Llewellyn (born 1876), cricketer, first non-White Test cricketer for South Africa
- Mbulelo Mabizela (born 1981), South African national football team player
- Nduduzo Makhathini, jazz musician
- Clinton Marius (born 1966) writer, performer
- Thuso Mbedu, (born 1991), actress; attended Pietermaritzburg Girls' High School
- Jomu Mbili (born 1981), cricketer
- Cuan McCarthy, fast-bowling The Proteas cricketer 1929–2000
- Phyllis McCarthy, authority on and breeder of Rhodesian Ridgebacks
- Ntuthuko Mchunu (born 1999), rugby union player; attended Piet Retief Primary School & Maritzburg College
- Cathcart William Methven (1849–1925), painter, engineer, and architect
- David Miller (born 1989), cricketer; attended Maritzburg College
- Greg Minnaar, professional downhill mountain bike racer; attended Carter High School
- Emmanuel Mkhize (born 1989), cricketer
- Zweli Mkhize (born 1956), politician, former Kwazulu-Natal premier; lived in Ashburton, Pietermaritzburg
- Bryce Moon, (born 1986) South Africa national football team (soccer) player was born in Pietermaritzburg and played for Pirates in his youth
- Ryan Moon (born 1996), South Africa national football team player; attended Maritzburg College
- Shaun Morgan, lead singer of Seether, former resident of Pietermaritzburg, attended both Merchiston Preparatory School and Maritzburg College
- Nina Myskow, British journalist and television personality; born in Pietermaritzburg; attended The Wykeham Collegiate
- Siphesihle Ndlovu, Premier Soccer League and South Africa national football team player
- Nkosingiphile Ngcobo, Premier Soccer League
- Blade Nzimande (born 1958), South African national minister and president of the South African Communist Party
- Alan Paton, author of Cry the Beloved Country, born and schooled (Maritzburg College) in Pietermaritzburg
- Vyvyan Pearse (1891–1956), cricketer
- Kevin Pietersen (born 1980), cricketer for the England National Cricket Team. Attended Maritzburg College
- Graeme Pope-Ellis, canoeist. Attended Alexandra High School.
- Brian Raubenheimer, racing diver
- Rowland Raw (1884–1915), cricketer
- Jo-anne Reyneke, (born 1988), actress. Attended Russell High School (Pietermaritzburg)
- Jonty Rhodes (born 1969), national cricketer
- Matthew Sates (born 2003), Olympic games swimmer. Attended St. Charles College, Pietermaritzburg
- Lunga Shabalala (born 1989), TV presenter, TV personality and actor; Maritzburg College
- Bandile Shandu, (born 1995), Premier Soccer League player; attended Maritzburg College
- Tom Sharpe, novelist, who described the city as "half the size of a New York cemetery and twice as dead"
- Peter Leslie Smith (born 1958), auxiliary bishop for the Archdiocese of Portland in Oregon
- Guy Spier (born 1966), value investor
- Dale Stewart, bassist of Seether, former resident
- Joel Stransky (born 1967), Springbok rugby player; born in Pietermaritzburg, attended Maritzburg College and University of Natal
- Frank Talbot (1930–2024), Australian ichthyologist born in Pietermaritzburg; former director of the Australian Museum
- Darian Townsend, Olympic swimmer. Attended Merchiston Preparatory School and Maritzburg College
- Kevin Volans, composer (born in Pietermaritzburg, 26 July 1949)
- Lance Woolridge, rally driver
- Philani Zulu, Premier Soccer League player
- Dumisani Zuma, Premier Soccer League player
- Lwandiswa Zuma (born 1996), South African first-class cricketer; attended Maritzburg College

== Twin towns and sister cities ==
City	Country	Year
Taichung	Taiwan	1983
Hampton	United States	1998

== See also ==
- Trams in Pietermaritzburg

== Bibliography ==
- Jenkins, G. 1971. A Century of History: the story of Potchefstroom. 2nd ed. AA Balkema. Cape Town. 120 p.
