= List of slums in South Africa =

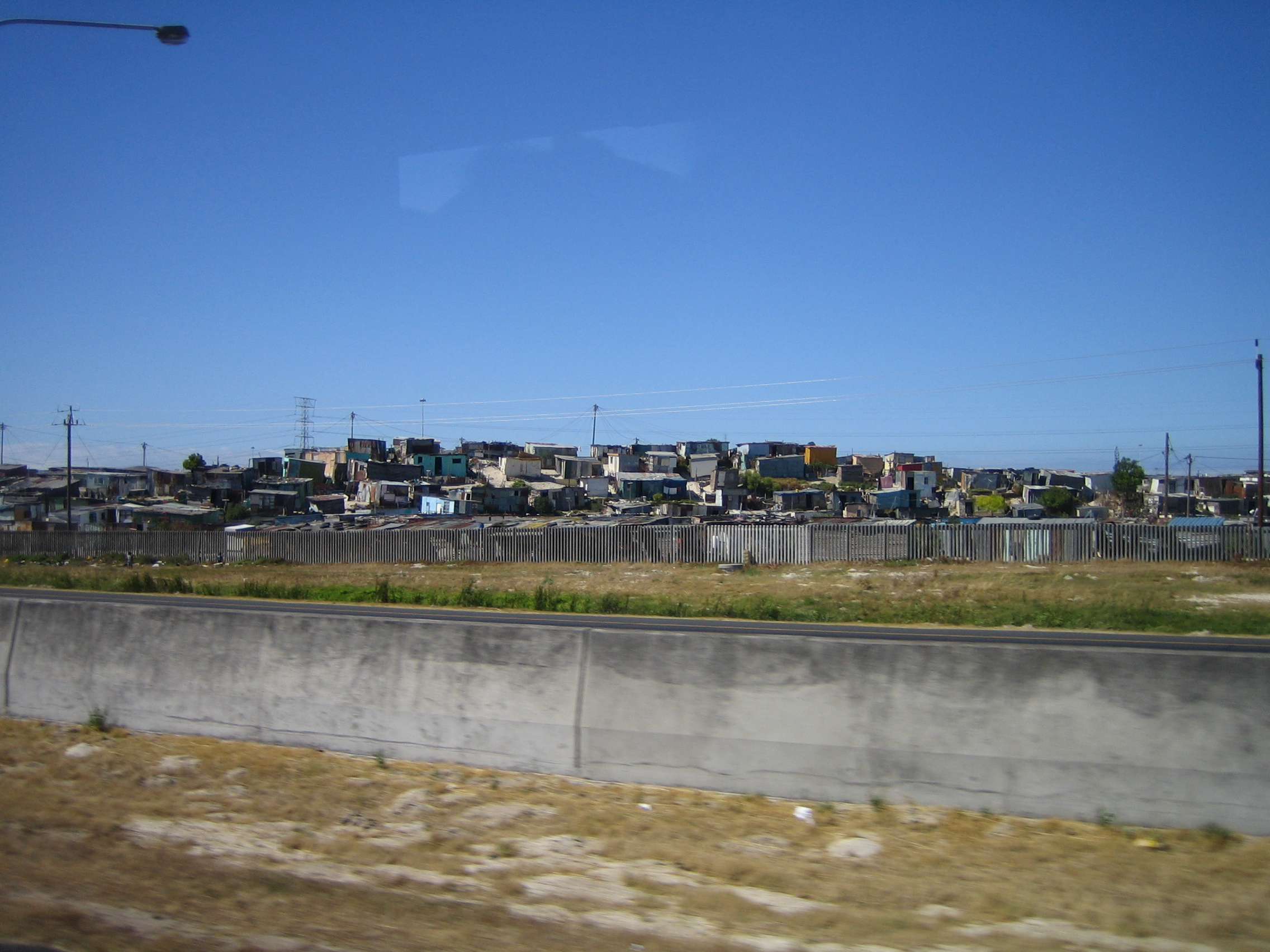
A shantytown in Cape Flats, Cape Town

Slums in South Africa exist in all major cities. There are also rural informal settlements. The slums are listed below under the city or town they are nearest to.

== Amanzimtoti ==
- KwaMakhutha

== Ballito ==
- Shaka's Head

== Cape Town ==
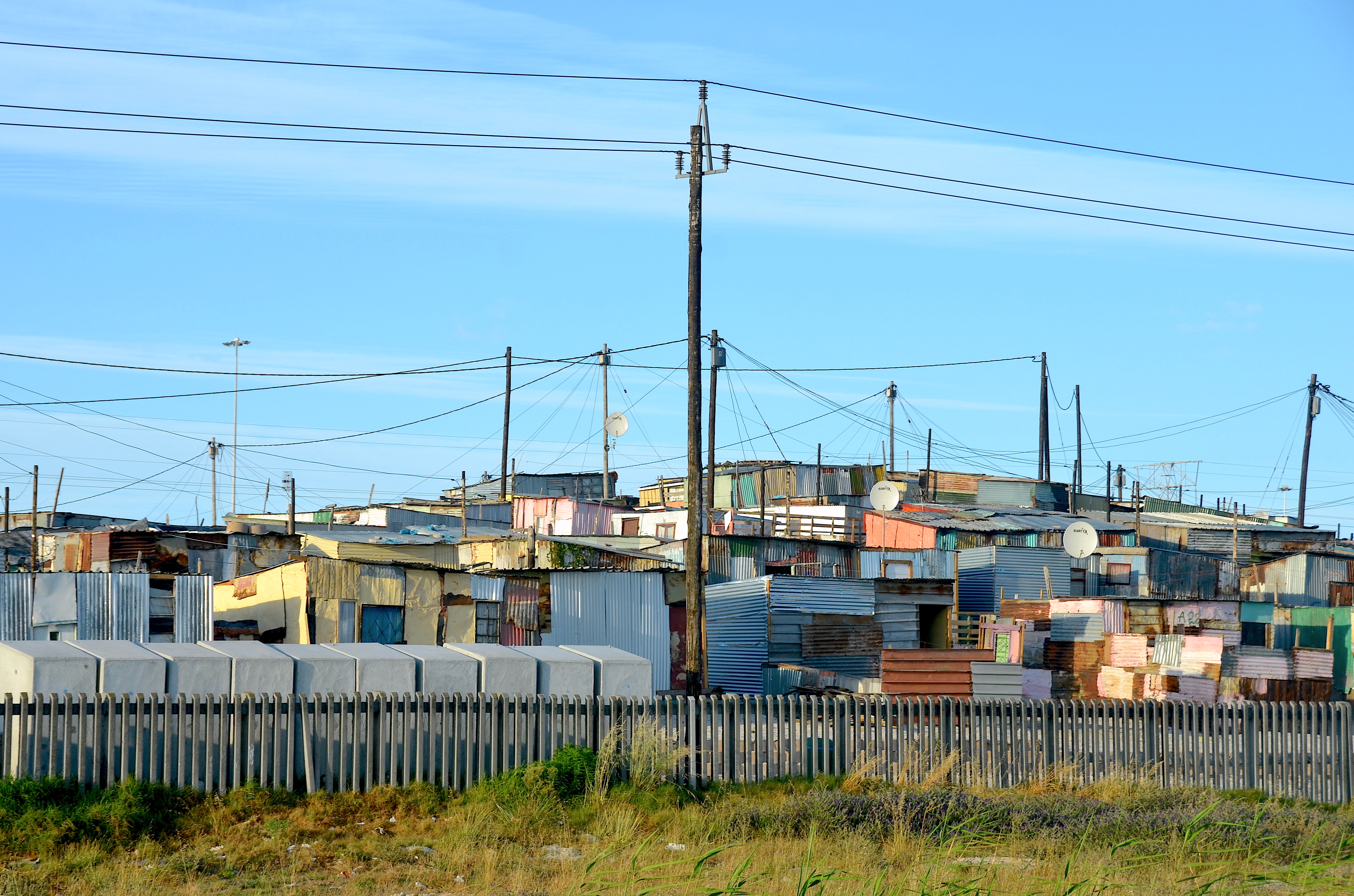
Khayelitsha in 2015

- Bonteheuwel
- Crossroads
- Du Noon
- Flamingo Crescent
- Gugulethu
- Joe Slovo
- Khayelitsha
- Langa
- Mfuleni
- Mitchells Plain- 310,485 inhabitants in 2011.
- Nyanga
- Philippi
- Santini

== Durban ==
- Chatsworth
- Inanda
- Kennedy Road
- KwaMashu - 175,663 inhabitants in 2011.
- Ntuzuma
- Piesangriver

== Durbanville ==
- Fisantekraal
- Klipheuwel

== East London ==
- Duncan Village
- Mdantsane - 156,835 inhabitants in 2011.

== Fish Hoek ==
- Masiphumelele

== George ==
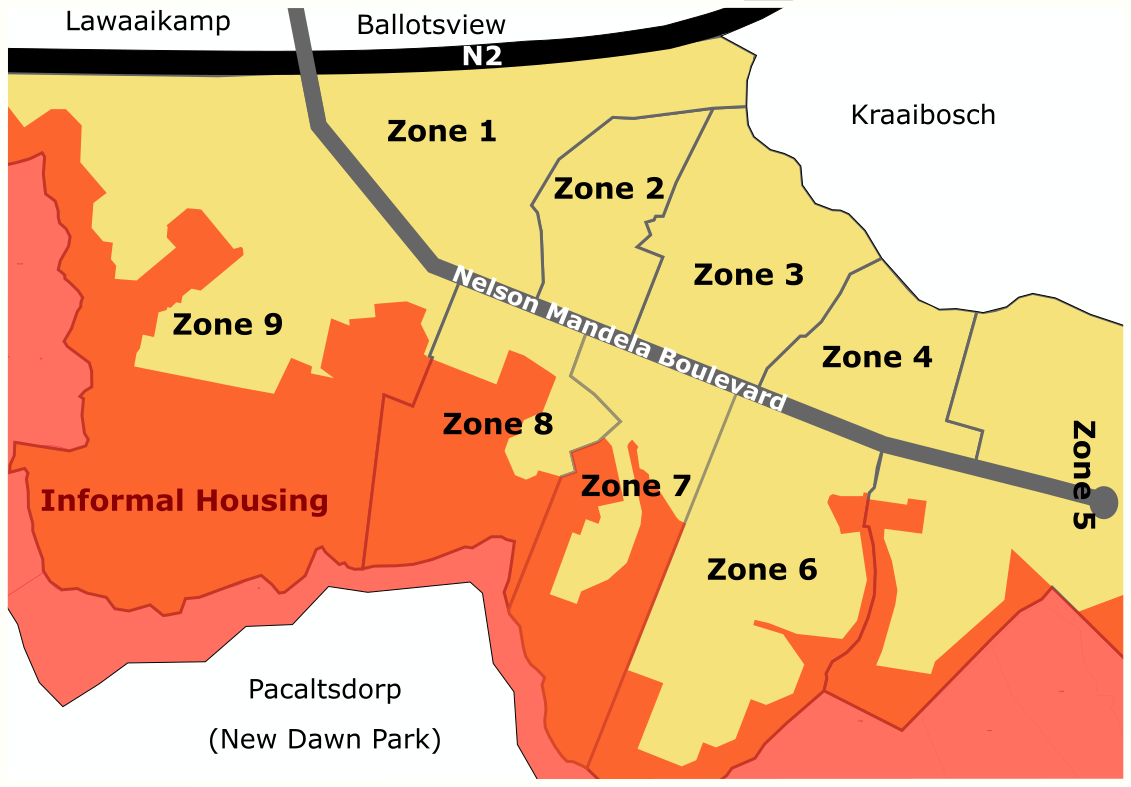
Map of Thembalethu showing zone of slum

- Thembalethu

== Hout Bay ==
- Imizamo Yethu

== Johannesburg ==
- Alexandra - 179,624 inhabitants in 2011.
- Kanana Park
- Soweto - 1,271,628 inhabitants in 2011.

== Kempton Park ==
- Thembisa

== Kraaifontein ==
- Bloekombos
- Wallacedene

== KwaDukuza ==
- Nkobongo (adjoining Shakaskraal)

== Margate ==
- KwaMasinenge

== Mbombela ==
- KaNyamazane
- Matafeni (Mataffin)
- Matsulu

== oThongathi ==
- Hambanathi

== Paarl ==
- Mbekweni

== Pinetown ==
- Clermont
- KwaDabeka
- Mpumalanga (Hammarsdale)
- Tshelimnyama

== Port Elizabeth ==
- Ibhayi - 237,799 inhabitants in 2011.
- Motherwell

== Port Shepstone ==
- Gamalakhe

== Randburg ==
- Cosmo City

== Rustenburg ==
- Freedom Park - estimated size 25,000 people in 2008.

== Stellenbosch ==
- Enkanini
- Kayamandi

== Strand ==
- Lwandle
- Nomzamo

== Verulam ==
- Waterloo

== See also ==
- List of slums
- Urbanization in Africa
