= Pinetown =

- City
- Location within KwaZulu-Natal Location within South Africa
- Coordinates: 29°49′S 30°51′E
- Country: South Africa
- Province: KwaZulu-Natal
- Municipality: eThekwini
- Established: 1849; 177 years ago

Area
  - Total: 86.15 km^{2} (33.26 sq mi)

Population (2011)
  - Total: 144,026
  - Density: 1,672/km^{2} (4,330/sq mi)

Racial makeup (2011)
  - Black African: 67.8%
  - Coloured: 4.3%
  - Indian/Asian: 9.3%
  - White: 18.0%
  - Other: 0.6%

First languages (2011)
  - Zulu: 55.4%
  - English: 31.4%
  - Afrikaans: 3.8%
  - Xhosa: 3.3%
  - Other: 6.2%
- Time zone: UTC+2 (SAST)
- Postal code (street): 3610
- PO box: 3600
- Area code: 031

Pinetown is a city that forms part of the eThekwini Metropolitan Municipality, based just inland from Durban in KwaZulu-Natal, South Africa. The city is situated 16 km (10 mi) north-west of Durban and 64 km (40 mi) south-east of Pietermaritzburg.

Until December 2023, Pinetown (excl. New Germany) maintained a distinct vehicular identity through its "NPN” registration plate prefix, representing Natal Pinetown.

== History ==
Pinetown was named after the governor of Natal, Sir Benjamin Pine. The town was established in 1850 around the Wayside Hotel, itself built in 1849 along the main wagon route between Durban and Pietermaritzburg. In the Victorian era Pinetown was known as health resort.

During the Second Boer War, the British built a concentration camp in Pinetown to house Boer women and children.

A number of German settlers made Pinetown their base and this accounts for the neighbourhood known as New Germany and the German Lutheran Church. Indeed, to this day imported German cakes and goodies pack the shelves at Christmas time in the Knowles Spar, the largest grocery store of Pinetown. One of the largest monasteries was located south of Pinetown in Mariannhill, home to the Mariannhill monastery founded by Abbot Pfanner. The establishment of this monastery had huge influence in the expansion of the Catholic Church in KwaZulu Natal.

The neighbouring area of Clermont was a solely black residential zone during the apartheid era, with land tenure being on a freehold basis unlike the state-owned townships elsewhere in Greater Durban metropolis. This meant residents enjoyed an atmosphere of freedom and this led to Clermont being a base for some well-known political activists during the apartheid era such as the lawyer Archie Gumede. Other personalities associated with Clermont are relatives of the leader of the world-renowned Ladysmith Black Mambazo musical group.

== Geography ==
=== Location ===
Pinetown lies at the base of Field's Hill on the banks of the uMbilo River, surrounded by Westville to the east, Queensburgh to the south-east and Kloof to the north-west. It is also centrally located to many predominantly Indian and Black townships including KwaDabeka and Clermont to the north-east, Chatsworth to the south-east, Klaarwater to the south and Luganda, Sgubudwini, Mpola, Tshelimnyama and KwaNdengezi to the south-west.

=== Topography ===
Pinetown is mostly hilly, apart from the relatively flat central business district. The eastern areas, including Cowie's Hill and the New Germany Nature Reserve, rise to about 400 m (1,312 ft) above sea level. In the north, Berkshire Downs in New Germany reaches around 393 m (1,289 ft). The lowest elevations, ranging between 170 m (558 ft) and 300 m (984 ft), are found in the southern parts of Pinetown.

=== Boundaries ===
Pinetown is part of the larger eThekwini Metropolitan Municipality and for voting purposes, falls within the IEC electoral Ward 18. Pinetown covers a large area of 86.15 km^{2} extending from the New Germany area in the north to Regency Park and Savannah Park in the south and from Paradise Valley and Moseley in the east to the industrial areas of Westmead and Mahogany Ridge that lie on the foot of Field's Hill in the west.

== Economy ==
=== Major companies ===
Corporations based in Pinetown include Educor (private tertiary education), Beier Group (textiles and personal protective equipment), Manolis Munchies (snacks retailer), Masscash (wholesaler owned by Massmart) and Powasol (chemicals).

=== Industries ===
Pinetown is one of four key industrial hubs in the Durban-Pinetown core industrial region, supported by various industrial suburbs. The western area includes Westmead, Mahogany Ridge, Alexander Park and Surprise Farm, while the northern area in New Germany includes Falcon Industrial Park, Mountain Ridge, New Germany Industrial Park, and Pineside. To the south, notable locations include Hagart Road Industrial, Southmead, and Mariann Industrial Park. The Pinetown region, particularly around Mahogany Ridge, hosts major distribution centres for companies like Clicks, PicknPay and Woolworths.

== Transport ==
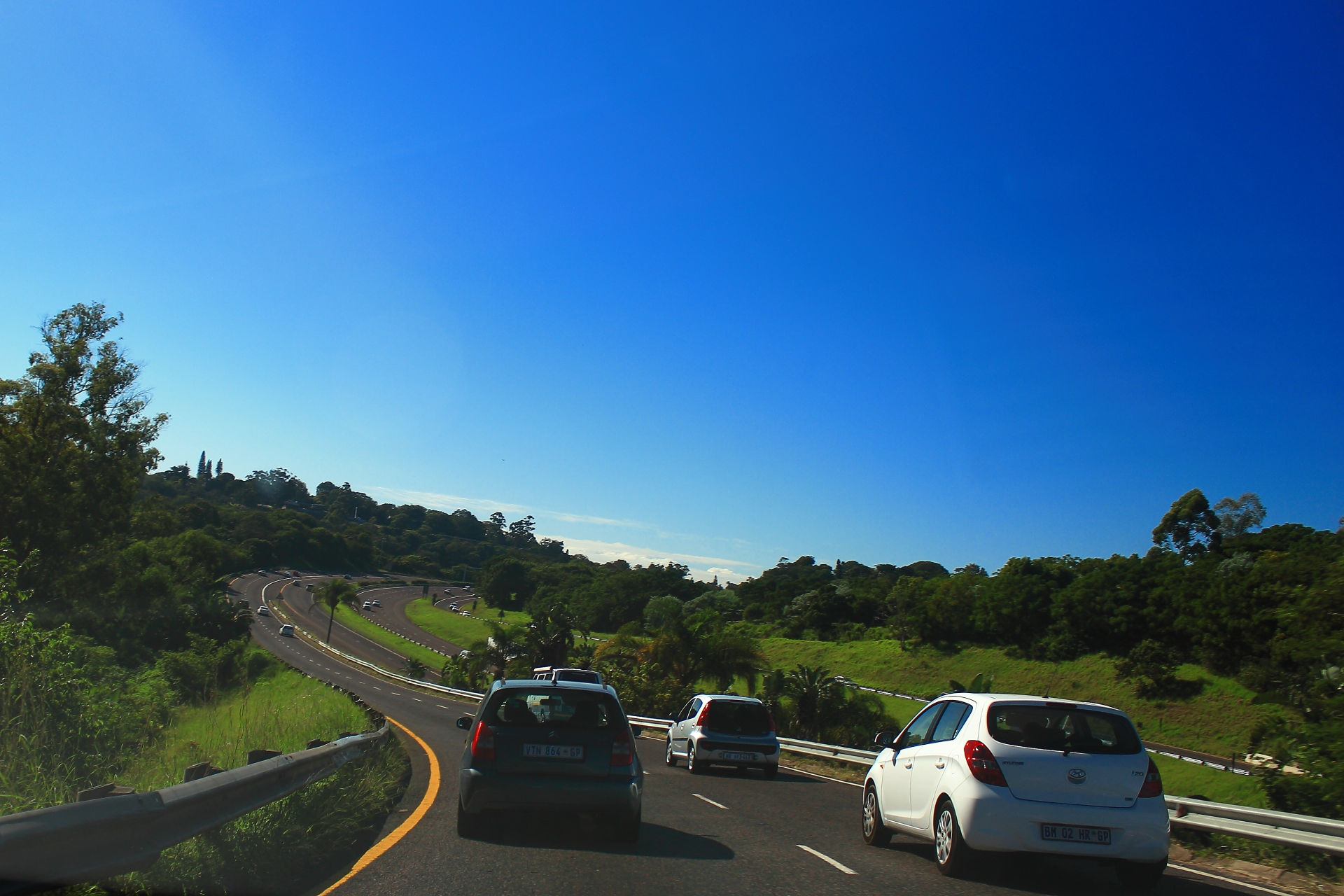
The interchange linking the King Cetshwayo Highway and N3 freeway at Paradise Valley, Pinetown

=== Public Transport ===
==== Bus ====
The first phase of a rapid bus system, GO!Durban, was due for implementation in September 2019, but was postponed because the municipality is scared of the Taxi bosses. The first phase envisages a link between Pinetown CBD and KwaMashu’s Bridge City Mall.

==== Rail ====
Metrorail operates commuter trains between Pinetown and Durban via Queensburgh along the Old Main Line, the historic railway connecting Durban and Pietermaritzburg. Key stations on this line in Pinetown include Pinetown railway station, which serves as the western terminus, as well as Sarnia, Glen Park, and Moseley. Additionally, Metrorail provides service from Durban to Cato Ridge via Queensburgh, Mariannhill (a southern suburb of Pinetown), and Mpumalanga on the New Main Line, the newer railway line between Durban and Pietermaritzburg.

=== Roads ===
Pinetown is well-connected to four major freeways. The N3 connects the town with Durban to the south-east and Pietermaritzburg to the north-west. The M13, named King Cetshwayo Highway, connects the town with Durban to the south-east via Westville and Hillcrest to the north-west via Kloof and Gillitts. Running south-east, the M7, named Solomon Mahlangu Drive, connects the town with Queensburgh. Running east, the M19 connects the town with Westville and Durban.

The town is also intersected by a number of metropolitan routes, namely; the M1 (Henry Pennington Road) to Chatsworth in the south-east, M5 to KwaDabeka and KwaMashu in the north and Queensburgh in the south-east, M32 (Rodger Sishi Road) to Westville in the east, M31 (Josiah Gumede Road) which runs as the main street of the town towards Cowie's Hill and the M34 (Hans Dettman Highway) to Shallcross in the south.

==== Tolling ====
The N3 is the main route forming the Mariannhill Toll Route (between Paradise Valley and Key Ridge) and involves payment of toll: Traffic arriving in Pinetown from the west and traffic heading west on the N3 (in the direction of Pietermaritzburg) must pass through the Mariannhill Toll Plaza, just west of Pinetown. The M13 between Paradise Valley (east of Pinetown) and Key Ridge (west of Pinetown, near Assagay) serves as an untolled alternative route to the N3 to avoid the Mariannhill Toll Plaza.

== Retail ==
Pine Crest Centre, situated at 17 Kings Road, is the biggest retail center in town. It opened around 1988 as the Sanlam Centre. In 2017 it was acquired by the JSE-listed company Vukile, and was upgraded to offer over 100 stores.

== Education ==
One of five campuses of the University of KwaZulu-Natal is in Pinetown, on the corner of Richmond (now renamed to Henry Pennington Road) and Mariannhill Roads. The Edgewood campus was originally established in the 1970s as a college to train (mostly white) students as teachers for the apartheid government's schools serving the white community. The purpose-built facilities were superior to other colleges of education where students of other races were trained as teachers. The specialised facilities enabled the training of art, music, drama, science and physical education teachers, and included rooms with overhead viewing platforms for unobtrusive classroom lesson demonstrations.

In 2001, as part of the central government's rationalisation of the higher education landscape, the Edgewood College of Education was incorporated into the University of Natal. Then in 2004, with the merger of the Universities of Natal and Durban-Westville to form the University of KwaZulu-Natal, Edgewood became the new University's 5th campus. Edgewood campus is wholly dedicated to the education of teachers and education professionals and is one of the largest producers of new teachers in South Africa. On this campus the University's School of Education offers a four-year full-time Bachelor of Education (B Ed) degree and one-year full-time Post Graduate Certificate in Education (PGCE) for those wanting a teaching qualification. Various other certificates are also offered as in-service training for teachers, as well as Honours, Masters and Doctoral degrees. The library collection is specially equipped to enable those studying education from undergraduate through to doctoral levels.

=== Schools ===
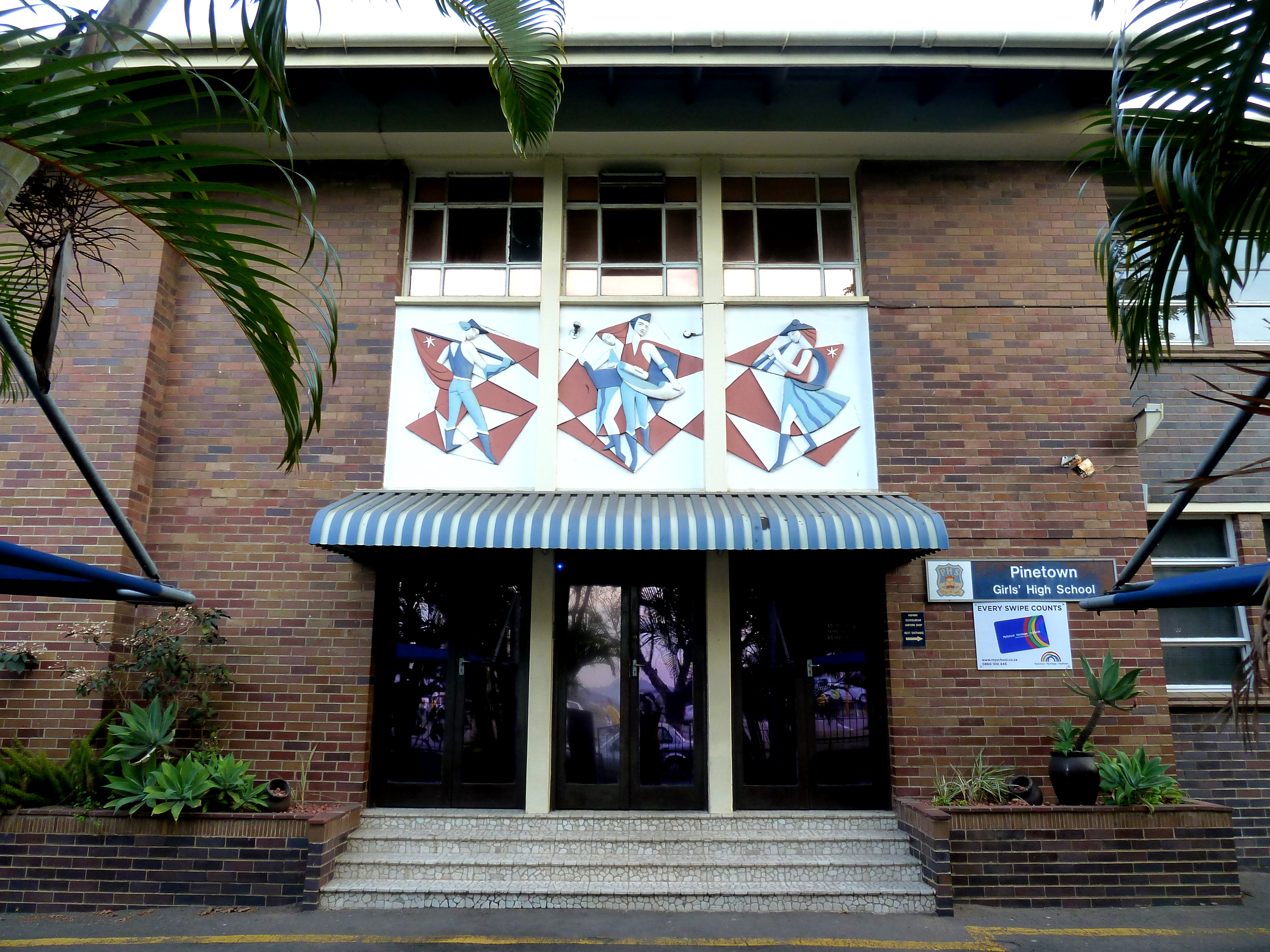
Main entrance of Pinetown Girls' High School in Josiah Gumede Road, Pinetown's main arterial road

Schools in Pinetown include:

- Pinetown Boys' High School
- Pinetown Girls' High School
- Savannah Park Secondary School
- St Benedict School Pinetown (independent)

=== Pre-Schools ===
Pre-Schools in Pinetown include:

- Kokkewiet Pre Pimêre Skool - Afrikaans

== Healthcare ==
Pinetown's medical facilities include:

- St Mary's, a government hospital in Mariannhill
- Life Crompton Hospital, a private hospital
- Medicross, a private medical centre

== Safety ==
Pinetown Police Station is located on Josiah Gumede Road in the Pinetown CBD with its large SAPS policing precinct covering most of Pinetown as well as Kloof, New Germany, Wyebank and Zamokuhle. The southern portion of Pinetown, known as the greater Mariannhill area, stretching south from Mariannhill to Regency Park and Savannah Park is covered by Mariannhill SAPS.

== Sport ==
=== Cricket club ===
Pinetown Cricket Club, established in 1873, is believed to be the oldest cricket club in KwaZulu-Natal and amongst the oldest in South Africa. The club, originally located at the Civic Centre in central Pinetown, has subsequently moved to Lahee Park. Under the chairmanship of former Pinetown mayor Vernon Hall, Lahee Park hosted ten first class games between 1974 and 1979. Former internationals Norman Crookes (twice selected for the Springbok squad) and Tertius Bosch have previously represented the club. Khaya Zondo and Cameron Delport from the 2010 Dolphins team have a close association with the club, as do KZN "B" cricketers Bruce Kruger and Kyle Buckthorp.

=== Comrades Marathon ===
Pinetown is situated on the route of the popular Comrades Marathon, which runs along the Old Main Road from Westville, over Cowies Hill past the Civic Centre and on to Fields Hill, and vice versa. This event always attracts hundreds of spectators.
