= 25th Annual South African Music Awards =

2019 award ceremony

25th South African Music Awards
- Date: June 1, 2019
- Location: Sun City, North West
- Country: South Africa
- Hosted by: Bob Mabena; Melanie Bala; Twasa Seoke; Khuli Chana
- Most nominations: Black Coffee (5)

Television/radio coverage
- Network: SABC

The 25th Annual South African Music Awards ceremony was held at the Sun City Arena in North West on June 1, 2019. It aired live on SABC 1. The show was hosted by Bob Mabena, Melanie Bala, Twasa and hip-hop star Khuli Chana.

The list of nominees was announced on April 25, 2019. HHP, TKZee & Mango Groove received the Lifetime Achievement Award at this years show.

== Winners and nominees ==
Nominees are as listed below. Winners are in bold.

Album of the Year

- **Sjava – Umqhele**
  - Black Coffee – Music is King
  - Black Motion – Moya Wa Taola
  - Vusi Nova – Manyan-nyan
  - Zonke – L.O.V.E

Female Artist of the Year

- **Sho Madjozi – Limpopo Champions League**
  - Busiswa – Summer Life
  - Kelly Khumalo – Unleashed
  - Lebo Sekgobela – Umusa
  - Zonke - L.O.V.E

Male Artist of the Year

- **Black Coffee – Music is King**
  - Anatii – IYEZA
  - Nakhane – You will not die
  - Sjava - Umqhele
  - Thokozani Langa - Iyabuza Induna

Newcomer of the Year

- **Sho Madjozi – Limpopo Champions League**
  - Simmy – Tugela Fairy
  - Mlindo The Vocalist – Emakhaya
  - Paxton – This is me
  - Sun-El Musician – Africa to the World

Duo/Group of the Year

- **Black Motion – Moya Wa Taola**
  - Tshwane Gospel Choir – The Next Revival
  - Spirit of Praise – Spirit of Praise Vol.7
  - Ofeleba – Hi & Low
  - Encore – Segarona

Best Rock Album

- **Dan Patlansky – Perfection Kills**
  - CrashCarBurn – Headlights
  - Hellcats – The Hex and the Healer
  - The Black Cat Bones – Here is a Knife
  - The Parlotones – China

Best Pop Album

- **Tresor – Nostalgia**
  - Jarrad Ricketts – Break the Rules
  - Paxton – This is me
  - Majozi – Majozi
  - Tholwana – 2.0.1.5

Beste Pop Album

- **Snotkop – SOUS**
  - 4 Werke - 4 by 4
  - The Rockets - Sonskyn
  - Brendan Peyper – Dis Nie Sonde Nie
  - Jan Bloukaas – Lewe

Best Afro Pop Album

- **Sjava – Umqhele**
  - Kelly Khumalo – Unleashed
  - Mlindo The Vocalist – Emakhaya
  - Simmy – Tugela Fairy
  - Vusi Nova – Manyan-Nyan

Best Jazz Album

- **Bokani Dyer Trio – Neo Native**
  - Thandi Ntuli - Exiled
  - Sibusiso Mash Mashiloane - Closer to Home
  - Tune Recreation Committee - Afrika Grooves with the Tune Recreation Committee
  - Mandisi Dyantyis - Somandla

Best R&B/Soul Album

- **Zonke – L.O.V.E**
  - Kabomo – All Things Red
  - Mlu – A Day For The Universe
  - Lady X – Love.Life.Complicated
  - Nicksoul – Therapy

Best Adult Contemporary Album

- **Ard Matthews – IImpossible Machines**
  - Watershed - Harbour
  - Roan Ash – Whiskey to my Soul
  - Georgetown – The Dog Show
  - 8 Misses Croon – ...Like never before

Beste Kontemporere Musiek Album

- **Coenie de Villiers – Pure Coenie**
  - Almero – Maandag
  - Douvoordag – Die Avontuur
  - Jan Blohm – Die Liefde Album
  - Refentse – Liefdegenerasie

Best Hip Hop Album

- **Nasty C – Strings and Bling**
  - AKA – Touch my Blood
  - Emtee – DIY2
  - Jabba X – #FGTBB
  - Kid X – Thank Da King

Best Reggae Album

- **Black Dillinger – Mavara is King**
  - The Meditators – Explosion
  - Ras Vuyo - Diversion
  - Botanist – Game Changer
  - Bongo Riot – Next Levels

Best Adult Contemporary Album

- **Watershed - Harbour**
  - Roan Ash - Whiskey to my Soul
  - Georgetown - The Dog Show
  - Ard Matthews - Impossible Machines
  - 8 Misses Croon -...Like never before

Remix of the Year

- **Spikiri - King Don Father**
  - Busiswa – Summer Life
  - Distruction Boyz - It Was All A Dream
  - DJ Maphorisa – Gqom Wave Vol.2
  - Sho Madjozi – Limpopo Champions League

Best Dance Album

- **Black Motion – Moya Wa Taola**
  - DJ Fistaz - Mixwell Summer
  - Sun-El Musician – Africa To The World
  - Mobi Dixon – 10 Steps Forward
  - Black Coffee – Music is King

Best Kwaito/Gqom/Amapiano

- **Zakwe - Sebentin ft. Refiloe Maele Phoolo, Jabulani Tsambo; Lesego Moiloa; Senzo Mfundo Vilakazi; Ncazelo Mtolo**
  - DJ Capital – Skebe Dep Dep ft. Kwesta, Kid X, Reason, Youngsta CPT and Stogie T
  - Prince Kaybee – Club Controller
  - SPHEctacula and DJ Naves – Bhampa
  - Zakes Bantwini – Bang Bang Bang

Collaboration of the year

- **Nakhane – You will Not Die**
  - Breindy and Matt – Ruth Ave
  - Gabi Motuba- Tefiti Goddess of Creation
  - Jeremy Loops - Critical As Water
  - Sannie Fox – My Soul Got Stranger

Best Live Audio Visual Recording

- **Cassper Nyovest – Fill up Orlando Stadium**
  - Neyi Zimu – Another Level of Worship
  - Krone Various Artists – Krone 5
  - Jabu Hlongwane – Crosspower Experience 3
  - Spirit of Praise Vol 7 - Spirit of Praise 7

Best Alternative Album

  - **Black Coffee – Drive ft. David Guetta and Delilah Montagu**
  - Sun-El Musician – Sonini ft. Simmy and Lelo Kamao
  - Sun-El Musician – Ntaba Ezikude ft. Simmy
  - Dj Sumbody – Monate Mpolaye ft. Cassper Nyovest, Thebe and Vettis
  - Black Coffee – Wish You Were Here featuring Msaki

Best African Indigenous Faith Album

- **Ithimba Le-Africa – Sesiphunyukile**
  - Trust in Christ Ministries – Elami Igama
  - The General Isitimela – Amen Ezulwini
  - In Zion of Christ - Izinyembezi
  - Christ Worshippers Mass Choir – Nkosi Ngiyakuthanda

Best Traditional Faith Music Album

- **Spirit of Praise 7 – Spirit of Praise Vol.7**
  - Lebo Sekgobela – Umusa
  - Paul K – Time of God Manifest
  - Sipho Ngwenya – Intimate Worship Season 3
  - Kholeka – ‘’’Your Word - Alibuyi Lilambatha Izwi Lakho

Best Contemporary Faith Music Album

- **We Will Worship – Seasons Volume 1**
  - Tshwane Gospel Choir – The Next Revival
  - Khaya Mthethwa – All About Jesus
  - Neyi Zimu – Another Level of Worship
  - Ntokozo Mbambo – Moments in Time

Best Maskandi Album

- **Sgwebo Sentambo – Yekani Umona**
  - Thokozani Langa – Iyabuza Induna
  - Ofeleba – Hi & Low
  - Mbuzeni – Ungishiyelani
  - Ichwane Lebhaca – Imali Yesoso

Rest of Africa Artist

- **Diamond Platnumz – A Boy From Tandale**
  - Kommanda Obbs – Kommanda Obbs
  - Mr Eazi – Lagos to London
  - Nixon – Who We Are
  - Oliver Mtukudzi – Hany'ga

Best Traditional Album

- **Candy – Hupenyu Unenge Viri**
  - Vhavhenda Cultural Group – Tshianda Nguvhoni
  - University of Limpopo Choristers & Kwazulu-Natal Philharmonic Orchestra - Africa Tivule
  - Tswelelang Cultural Dancers – Motho Wa Me
  - Mzimkhulu Happy Boys – Nqoba izitha

Best Engineered Album

- **Vusi Nova – Manyan-nyan**
  - CH2 – Starstruck
  - Nasty C – Strings and Bling
  - Sjava – Umqhele
  - Hellcats – The Hex and the Healer

Best Produced Album

- **Nasty C – String and Bling**
  - AKA – Touch my Blood
  - Kholeka - Your Word - Alibuyi Lilambatha Izwi Lakho
  - Mlindo The Vocalist – Emakhaya
  - Zonke – L.O.V.E

Music Video of the Year

- **Jeremy Loops – Gold**
  - Bongeziwe Mabandla ft. Spoek Mathambo – Bawo Wam
  - Mafikizolo ft. Jah Prayzah - Mazuva Akanaka
  - Sho Madjozi - Huku
  - The Parlotones - Beautiful Life

Record of the Year (fan Voted)

- **Holly Rey - Deeper**
  - AKA and Kiddominant - Fela in Versace
  - Sun-El Musician featuring Simmy and Lelo Kamau - Sonini
  - Sjava featuring Emtee - Abangani
  - Mlindo the Vocalist featuring Kwesta and Thabsie - Macala
  - Vusi Nova and Jessica Mbangeni - Asphelelanga
  - DJ Ganyani featuring Nomcebo - Emazulwini

== Multiple wins and nominations ==
Artists that received multiple nominations
Nominations	Artist
5	Black Coffee
4	Zonke
4	Sjava
4	Sun-El Musician
4	Sho Madjozi
2	Busiswa
2	AKA
2	Paxton
2	Black Motion
2	Nakhane
2	Vusi Nova
2	Cassper Nyovest
2	Kholeka
2	Nasty C
2	Jan Bloukaas

== Special awards ==
International Achievement Award

- None

Lifetime Achievement Award

- HHP
- TKZee
- Mango Groove

=== Sales and Downloads Awards ===
Best DVD Selling Album

- Joyous Celebration 22 All for You

Best Selling Digital Artist

- Joyous Celebration 22

'SAMRO/CAPASSO HIGHEST AIRPLAY COMPOSER’S AWARD'

- Lady Zamar -Collide

SAMRO/CAPASSO BEST DIGITAL DOWNLOAD AWARD'

- Joyous Celebration 22 All for You

== Change ==
In 2019, When the nominations came out the "Kwaito" category was combined into the kwaito/gqom/amapiano category, this change sparked a backlash from fan and kwaito artists who were unhappy with the combination of this genre, kwaito artist Israel Matseke led the complaints committee with the hashtag #DeathOf Kwaito, saying "that combining the three "different" genres was a deliberate attempt to kill the original kwaito sound". Responding to the backlash, Nhlanhla Sibisi, the CEO of the Recording Industry of South Africa (Risa), explained their reasons behind adding gqom and amapiano to the kwaito category.

Gqom and amapiano are both sub-genres of kwaito. Record labels felt it was important to mention them and recognise the growth kwaito has birthed into the music industry. Adding the names to title of the category was our way of recognising the power of kwaito. To say that kwaito is the reason why gqom and amapiano exist and it is important.
