= Eric Mtshali =

South African politician and trade unionist (1933–2018)

Eric Mtshali OMBS
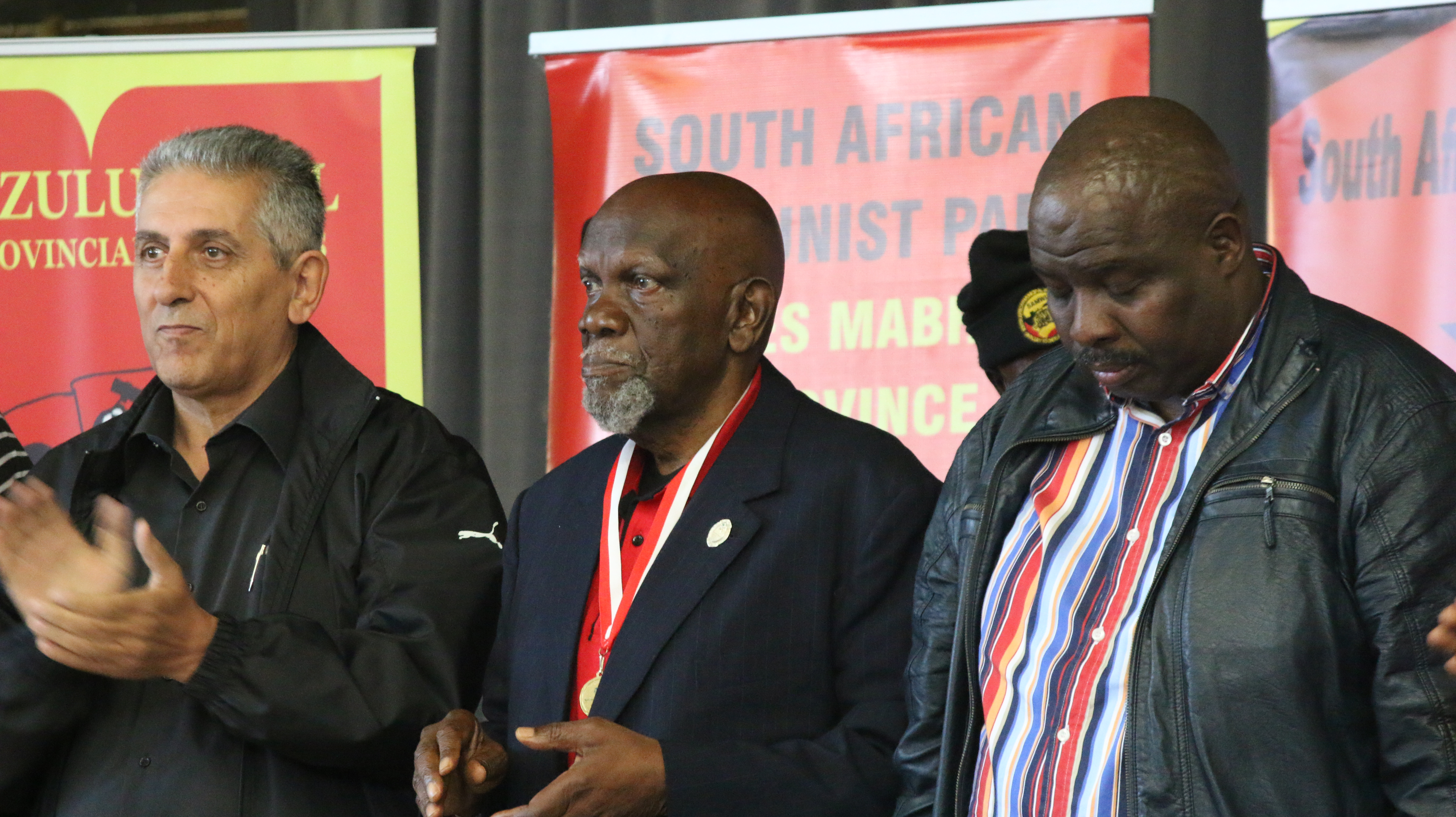

Member of the National Assembly
- In office 23 April 2004 – 6 May 2014

Personal details
- Born: 20 November 1933 Durban, Natal Province; Union of South Africa
- Died: 12 October 2018 (aged 84) Durban, KwaZulu-Natal; Republic of South Africa
- Party: African National Congress
- Other political affiliations: South African Communist Party
- Nickname: Stalin

Eric "Stalin" Mtshali (20 November 1933 – 12 October 2018) was a South African politician, trade unionist, and anti-apartheid activist. He was a founding member both of the South African Congress of Trade Unions in 1955 and of Umkhonto we Sizwe in 1961. He was also a stalwart of the South African Communist Party.

After three decades in exile with the African National Congress (ANC), Mtshali returned to South Africa in 1991. Once apartheid was abolished, he served in the South African Police Service and as a local councillor in eThekwini before joining the National Assembly, where he represented the ANC for two terms from 2004 to 2014.

== Early life and career ==
Mtshali was born on 20 November 1933 in Durban in the former Natal province, where he was educated and where he became involved in the anti-apartheid movement. He rose to prominence as a young trade union organiser among Natal's dockworkers and textile workers, and he was a founding member of the South African Congress of Trade Unions (Sactu) in 1955. Also in 1955, he volunteered as a fieldworker on the Freedom Charter campaign.

He was recruited into the South African Communist Party (SACP) in 1957, during a period in which the party was banned and operating underground. He earned the nickname "Stalin" for his admiration for Joseph Stalin, the former leader of the Soviet Union. In 1961, after the African National Congress (ANC) founded Umkhonto we Sizwe (MK), Mtshali was among the first cohort of recruits to its underground command structure in Natal.

== Activism in exile: 1962–1991 ==
Mtshali went into exile with MK in 1962 and received military and intelligence training in Cuba and the Soviet Union. Upon the completion of his training, he was stationed at MK's base at Kongwa, Tanzania, where he was appointed chief of personnel. He held that position during the Wankie and Sepolilo campaigns. Also during this period, Mtshali, Chris Hani, and others founded Dawn, a weekly MK journal, which Mtshali edited from 1964 to 1969. He was first elected to the Central Committee of the SACP in 1971.

Over the next two decades, Mtshali held a series of positions in the ANC, Sactu, and the SACP: he was the ANC's chief representative in Tanzania; then Sactu's representative at the World Federation of Trade Unions in Prague, where he succeeded Moses Mabhida; and then, from 1982, the head of Sactu's propaganda and publicity department. In the latter capacity, he arranged for the distribution of progressive union propaganda inside South Africa, including a version of The Communist Manifesto that he personally translated into Zulu. At the same time, Mtshali was involved in developing MK's internal intelligence capabilities; at the time of his death, he was the last surviving founding member of Imbokodo, the security wing of the ANC's Department of National Intelligence and Security.

== Post-apartheid political career ==
In 1991, during the negotiations to end apartheid, Mtshali returned to South Africa, where he became a member of the regional executive committee of the ANC's branch in Southern Natal. Between 1995 and 2000, he worked in the post-apartheid South African Police Service as deputy provincial commissioner for criminal intelligence in KwaZulu-Natal. He was elected to represent the ANC as a local councillor in eThekwini in the 2000 local elections. At the same time, he returned to the SACP Central Committee: he was elected to a five-year in term in 2002, and in 2007, he and two others – Kay Moonsamy and John Nkadimeng – were co-opted onto the committee as "veterans" of the party.

In the 2004 general election, Mtshali was elected to represent the ANC in the National Assembly, the lower house of the South African Parliament. He served two consecutive terms, gaining re-election in 2009, and left after the 2014 general election. In 2011, he was one of several MPs who appeared to defy a three-line whip by skipping a parliamentary vote on the ANC's controversial Secrecy Bill, although it was not clear whether Mtshali's absence had been excused by the party.

== Personal life and death ==
Mtshali's first wife died while he was in exile; he later remarried to Gcinile Kunene. He had one daughter and several grandchildren. After leaving Parliament, he retired to New Germany, KwaZulu-Natal. In 2016, he was one of 101 ANC stalwarts who signed an open letter expressing concern about the "ills befallen our organisation" during the presidency of Jacob Zuma.

Mtshali died on 12 October 2018 at Inkosi Albert Luthuli Hospital in Durban after a long illness.

== Honours ==
A secondary school in Wyebank is named after Mtshali; it was unveiled by KwaZulu-Natal provincial minister Peggy Nkonyeni in 2014. The following year, in December 2015, President Zuma awarded Mtshali the Order of Mendi for Bravery in silver, for "his excellent contribution to the fight against the oppressive and racist apartheid regime". In July 2017, the SACP's 14th congress awarded him the party's Moses Kotane Award for outstanding service to the party, in terms of which he was granted lifetime membership in the Central Committee.

== See also ==
- History of the African National Congress
- Durban moment
