= Uyajola 9/9 =

South African reality television series

- Genre: Reality
- Based on: Cheaters
- Presented by: Jub Jub; Moss Makwati; Ntombi Ngcobo-Mzolo
- Country of origin: South Africa

Production
- Production company: Rare Breed Entertainment

Original release
- Network: Moja Love
- Release: 26 May 2019 – present

Uyajola 9/9 is a South African reality television show playing on Moja Love channel 157 weekly. It is a hidden camera reality television series about people who suspect their partners of infidelity. The series premiered on 26 May 2019. The show is hosted by Jub Jub and Moss Makwati who are also co producers of the show.

The name Uyajola 9/9 is derived from a street word meaning "you are having an affair". 9/9 is a Tsotsitaal word loosely meaning "for real", so Uyajola 9/9 would then mean "You are having an affair for real".

== Formation ==
Uyajola 9/9 is based on the American reality TV show Cheaters. It airs on Sunday evenings with 30 minute episodes played back-to-back on Moja Love 157. The show starts with the host sitting at the headquarters and reads a letter from the complainant then goes out to visit the complainant to hear the story face to face, then asks to be given some time to investigate a case of infidelity thoroughly. After thorough investigation, the complainant is presented with evidence and the suspect is confronted.

== Controversy and incidents ==
Uyajola 9/9 has been accused of using black pain for ratings. Many viewers signed a petition to have the show cancelled after it was alleged by the Daily Sun that some stories were scripted and that people were paid to be on the first episode of the show under false pretence. This did not pass as the show still airs and the channel responded on Twitter and on radio, saying that stories were real.
