= KwaDabeka =

Township in KwaZulu-Natal, South Africa

- Location within KwaZulu-Natal Location within South Africa
- Coordinates: 29.76830°S 30.9130°E
- Country: South Africa
- Province: KwaZulu-Natal
- Municipality: eThekwini

Area
  - Total: 11.87 km^{2} (4.58 sq mi)

Population (2011)
  - Total: 54 953
  - Density: 4.5/km^{2} (12/sq mi)

Racial makeup (2011)
  - Black African: 99.6
  - Coloured: 0.2%
  - Indian/Asian: 0.1%
  - Other: 0.1%

First languages (2011)
  - Zulu: 88.0%
  - Xhosa: 4.1%
  - English: 3.4%
  - S. Ndebele: 1.3%
  - Other: 3.2%
- Time zone: UTC+2 (SAST)
- Postal code (street): 3610
- PO box: 3612
- Area code: 031

KwaDabeka is a township in KwaZulu-Natal, South Africa, located north-west of Durban and means "at the Dabeka location".

== Geography ==
KwaDabeka is situated approximately 24 km north-west of Durban and 6 km north-east of New Germany and forms part of the eThekwini Metropolitan Municipality which is Durban's greater metropolitan area.

KwaDabeka is bordered by the uMngeni River and eMachobeni in the north, Ntuzuma in the north-east, Newlands West in the east, Clermont in the south and Wyebank in the west. KwaDabeka occupies an extensive area and is subdivided into multi-sections which are primarily in the form of letters. The sections include KwaDabeka Unit A to H, KwaDabeka Unit J to L, KwaDabeka Unit R to T and Siphumelele.

Most people speak about KwaDabeka as a township separate from Clermont, however Clermont KwaDabeka Tourism Development describes KwaDabeka and Clermont as a collective township and also as one of Clermont's 7 suburbs.

== Lifestyle of KwaDabeka ==
KwaDabeka consists of 17 sections all going alphabetical order from A to S. KwaDabeka owns one of the largest hostel in the Southern Hemisphere. The predominant problems in this community are poverty, HIV/AIDS, unemployment and lack of economic opportunity, crime, drugs, domestic violence and rape.

== Transport ==
KwaDabeka is well connected to the rest of the eThekwini Municipality through the M5. The M5 East (Dumisani Makhaye Drive, recently opened in 2017) links it to King Shaka International Airport via the neighbouring suburbs of KwaMashu, Newlands (East and West) and Verulam, to meet the N2 at Sea Cow Lake (R102) or Mount Edgecombe (M41). The M5 West (Dinkelman Road/Otto Volek Road) also links KwaDabeka with Umbilo via Pinetown (via the M32 Qashana Khuzwayo Road or M19 Umngeni Drive), Queensburgh and Sarnia. It is also linked to the N3 (and Pietermaritzburg) via Wyebank Road, which meets the M13 (King Cetshwayo Highway) at Kloof. However Wyebank Road is in desperate need of upgrades if it is to serve as the main arterial route linking Durban's Inner West suburbs with King Shaka International.

The taxi business is well-established in KwaDabeka, with a taxi rank at the KK Hostel (Kranskloof Hostel, also the largest hostel in the Southern Hemisphere) serving as a base for taxis linking KwaDabeka's commuters with the rest of Durban.

KwaDabeka is also served by two of Durban's largest bus companies - Metro/KKC LTD and Durban Transport (colloquially known as 'umasipala'). However Metro buses are more frequent in KwaDabeka (and neighboring Clermont).

== Tourism ==
There has been effort by the eThekwini Metropolitan Municipality and Durban Tourism to establish tourism in the townships surrounding Durban including KwaDabeka. Clermont KwaDabeka Tourism Development was established in 2013 as a community tourism organisation by Durban Tourism and the KZN Department of Tourism. The aim of the organisation was to give tourists a township experience and teach them about the history of KwaDabeka and the neighbouring township of Clermont.
