= Thenjiwe =

South African comedienne, actress and MC

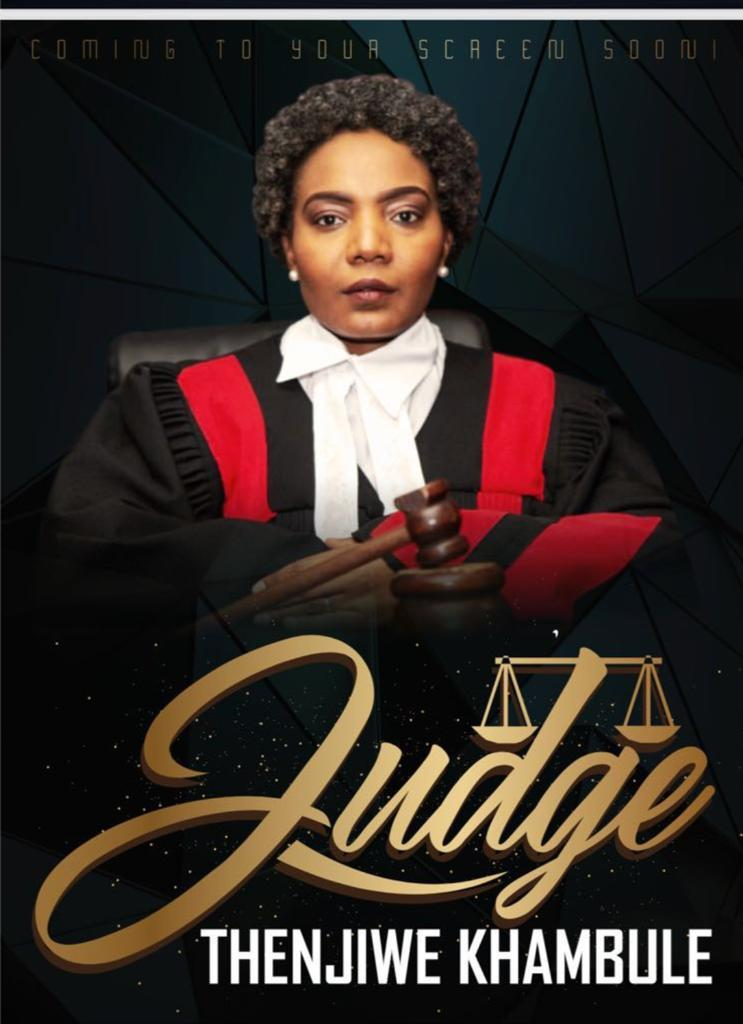
- Thenjiwe in 2019
- Born: Thenjiwe Maphumulo; 29 September 1977 (age 49)
- Education: Durban University of Technology (Performing Arts); University of London (Diploma in Law); London Metropolitan University (Bachelor of Laws)
- Notable work: Judge Thenjiwe Khambule; Meet the Khambules
- Spouse: John William Moseley (m. 2004; div. 2018)
- Children: Jack Unathi Moseley
- Parents: Thenene Sipho Langa (father); Nonhlanhla Viera Maphumulo (mother)

Comedy career
- Years active: 2010 - present
- Website: thenjiwecomedy.co.za

Thenjiwe Moseley born Thenjiwe Maphumulo on 29 September 1977 is a South African comedian, actress, master of ceremonies and entrepreneur originating from KwaMashu, Durban. Professionally, she is simply known as Thenjiwe. She created and acted in Judge Thenjiwe Khambule and Meet the Khambules which aired on Moja Love. She is a goodwill ambassador for Southern Africa Embrace Foundation, Toronto and Great Impact, Durban. She is also a YouTube content creator and influencer, having been made famous by the sketches she posts on social media.

== Early life and education ==
Thenjiwe was born on 29 September 1977 in the apartheid era to teenage parents, Thenene Sipho Langa and Nonhlanhla Viera Maphumulo. She was raised in Kwamashu, G Section, KwaZulu-Natal by her grandparents Joshua Bhekokwakhe Maphumulo, a political activist, and Agnes Ntombizodwa Maphumulo, a maid and seamstress.

Because of the political unrest in the country and her grandfather's involvement in the struggle, Thenjiwe frequently changed from one school to another. She completed her secondary education at Northmead Secondary School and later joined Natal Technical College (Natal Teknikon) which is now Durban University of Technology where she graduated in Performing Arts in 1998. After graduation, she waited for casting opportunities in vain because she could not afford an agent or go to live in Johannesburg and so, in 2001, she left for the US, where she lived for two years, working as an au pair, while studying Business Management at Montgomery County Community College in Pennsylvania. She later relocated to the United Kingdom, living there for 12 years, during which time she studied law, graduating first from University of London with a Diploma in Law in 2006 and then later a Bachelor of Laws from the London Metropolitan University in 2009.

== Career ==
=== Lawyer ===
After graduating from Law School, Thenjiwe worked as an immigration lawyer from 2010 to 2015.

=== Comedian ===
==== 2013 - 2020 ====
It was after she and her colleagues had a good day in court in 2013, that they went to celebrate in a pub which happened to host a comedy night. She was dared to perform and she did five minutes on stage and was noticed by a talent scout. She later resigned from her job in November 2015 to concentrate on her comedy career. She got gigs in a few clubs. Her first performance was at Wokingham Theatre. In 2013, she competed in the Funny Woman Awards in the United Kingdom, and the exposure made comedian Celeste Ntuli notice and invited her to be the opening act for her one-woman show, Myself. This opened doors for more opportunities to perform in South Africa. But the five-minute slots she was being offered could not financially justify frequently flying from the United Kingdom.

Having been disrespected as a woman comedian, Thenjiwe decided to use social media to promote her content.

"As a female performer, I was disrespected a lot – one promoter did not pay me after performing in two of his sold out shows (where I got standing ovations), so I decided to reach people through social media".

In February 2015, she joined YouTube, subsequently posting comedy video sketches which made her famous.

Between 2015 and 2016, she appeared as a guest comedian in the Season 1 of Bantu Hour on SABC 2.

In 2016, together with Celeste Ntuli, Tumi Morake, Noko Moswete, Nina Hastie and Tracey-Lee Oliver, she performed in an all-women cast comedy show Bitches Be Back.

In March 2018, she performed at the Magners International Comedy Festival in Thailand, Vietnam and The Philippines. In August, she headlined a show in Eswatini dubbed Laugh Goes On and in December, she performed at the 4th Annual Durban Comedy Festival in South Africa.

In May 2019, Thenjiwe, Mark Banks, Alfred Adriaan and Eugene Khozawas were part of the South African All Star Tour in Sydney and Perth, Australia. Later in the same month she headlined at the Combo Comedy Show Fest at the Carnival City. In June, she performed at the Eswatini Must Laugh comedy show in Eswatini. In August, she performed at the Kings and Queens of Comedy: Women's Day Edition.

==== 2021 - present ====
In April 2023, Thenjiwe won the King Gong Comedy at The Comedy Store (London) and in May, she won The Black Out at Up the Creek (comedy club). In August 2023, she debuted at the Edinburgh Festival Fringe with her comedy special The Mandela Effect.

In March 2024, she was listed by YouTube as one of the mentors for the #WomenofYouTube 2024 programme, which aims to support women creators across North America and sub-Saharan Africa. The initiative was covered by several media outlets, including Social Media Today and Thred , highlighting YouTube’s efforts to promote female representation on its platform.

Thenjiwe represented South Africa at the World Comedy Clash, held at Hackney Empire in London in May 2025, where she joined an international line‑up of comedians from 11 countries.

Thenjiwe returned to her hometown of Durban in July 2025 for a one-night show titled Thenjiwe Unplugged at the Playhouse Theatre, marking a “homecoming” performance and reaffirming her connection with South African audiences.

She subsequently took the Thenjiwe Unplugged tour to Eswatini, where she performed at the Eswatini Theatre Club in Mbabane in October 2025, an event described as a “heartfelt reunion” that promised to “leave audiences in stitches”. The show featured collaborations with regional stand-up artists such as Sandile M, Thando and Mdura, and was praised for blending humour with social commentary, drawing on Thenjiwe’s experience of living abroad, her South African upbringing, and themes of family dynamics, language barriers and culture. Returning after her internationally acclaimed Mandela Effect tour and a sold-out Edinburgh Fringe run, she delivered sharp, relatable storytelling while reflecting on shared experiences, including the challenges of the COVID-19 pandemic.

The international leg of her tour continued in London on 1 November and Dublin on 2 November 2025, before concluding at the Zed Laugh Festival in Lusaka, Zambia, on 28 November. The festival, organised by Night of Laughter, was scheduled to take place at the Mulungushi International Conference Centre and featured a lineup of prominent African comedians.

==== Comedy Specials ====
- 2015 - Laughter is the Best Medicine
- 2016 - Born again African
- 2017 - Hurricane Thenjiwe
- 2018 - From KwaMashu to the World
- 2018 - Wrong Role Model
- 2019 - Thenjiwe Live in London
- 2023 - The Mandela Effect

=== Acting ===
Thenjiwe made her debut in acting as Doris in The Road in 2015.

In 2017, Thenjiwe acted in a TV drama series, The Harvest, as Zodwa. In the same year, she acted in two Nollywood movies; 10 Days in Sun City in June and The Accidental Spy in December.

In 2018, she acted as Thenjiwe “Mthandazi” Mvelase, an out-of-work prophetess in Imbewu.

In 2019, she acted in a South African thriller movie, Uncovered.

=== Hostess ===
Thenjiwe has been an Mc at the African Union in Belgium and the Department of Trade and Industry in Pretoria. In 2016, she was a commentator in the countdown show 10 over 10 on Vuzu.

== Personal life ==
Thenjiwe married John William Moseley on 5 April 2004. Together, they have a son, Jack Unathi Moseley, born 22 May 2005 in Woking England. She lives with her family in Woking, Surrey but frequently travels for shows to South Africa and elsewhere. Thenjiwe is a Goodwill ambassador for Southern Africa Embrace Foundation, Toronto and Great Impact, Durban. Thenjiwe is a Christian.

== Filmography ==
=== Films ===
Year	Film	Character	Notes	Citation
2014	Angel	Veronica		
2014	Liputsa Lami	Thenjiwe		
2014	Family Puzzle	Thenjiwe		
2015	Brazzaville à Johannesburg	Thenjiwe		
2017	Accidental Spy	Thenjiwe		
2017	10 Days in Sun City	Thenjiwe		
2019	Uncovered	Thishiwe		

=== Television ===
Year	Show	Character	Network	Notes	Citation
2015-2016	The Bantu Hour	Guest Comedian	SABC 2	Season 1	
2016	The Road	Doris	Mzansi Magic	Season 1	
2016	10 Over 10	Commentator - Herself	Vuzu, Mzansi Magic	Season 4	
2017	Harvest	Zodwa	E.tv	Her first appearance was in Season 1, Episode 2	
2017	#Karektas	Celebrity Guest	SABC2	Season 1 Episode 4	
2018	Meet the Khambules	Mrs. Khambule	Moja Love	Season 1	
2018-2019	Imbewu: The Seed	Mthandazi	E.tv	Seasons 1 & 2	
2018-2019	Judge Thenjiwe Khambule	Judge Khambule	Moja Love	Seasons 1, 2 & 3	

== Awards ==
Year	Award	Category	Result
2013	Funny Women Awards		Finalist
2014	Comics Choice	Audience Choice award	Nominated
2017	Great Impact Business Awards	Comedian of the Year	Won
2018	Simon Sabela Awards	Best Newcomer Actress TV	Nominated
2018	Savanna Comics' Choice Awards	The Comics’ Pen Award	Nominated
2018	African Emerging Film Makers	Best Actress	Won
2018	African Emerging Film Makers	Best Original Story Writer	Won
2018	Simon Sabela Awards	Best Producer	Won
2018	Simon Sabela Awards	Best Writer	Won
