= Busiswa =

South African singer and songwriter (born 1988)

- Born: Busiswa Gqulu; 8 November 1988 (age 37); Mthatha, Eastern Cape, South Africa
- Genres: Kwaito; House; Gqom; Amapiano; Afropop
- Occupations: Singer; songwriter; poet
- Instrument: Vocals
- Years active: 2008–present
- Labels: Kalawa Jazmee Records; Universal Records

Busiswa Gqulu (born 8 November 1988), known mononymously as Busiswa, is a South African singer-songwriter and poet. Born in Mthatha, Eastern Cape, South Africa, she gained public recognition for her feature on DJ Zinhle's song, "My Name Is", after being discovered by Kalawa Jazmee's CEO Oskido.

After a successful collaboration with DJ Zinhle, she released hits singles includes; "Ngoku", "Lahla", and was featured on Bhizer's hit, "Gobisiqolo". On 8 December 2017, she released her debut album, Highly Flavoured, preceded by single, "Bazoyenza". Throughout her career, Gqulu has received numerous accolades. In 2014, she was named in the Mail & Guardian 200 Young South Africans.

== Early life ==
Busiswa Gqulu was born on 8 November 1988 in Mthatha, Eastern Cape. When she was young, her family relocated to Durban because of her parents’ work. At the age of 15, Gqulu grew passion for writing poems. "I've been doing poetry since 2004 when I was in Grade 11", she recalled. She performed her first poetry work at her grandmother's funeral. In 2005, she joined the collective Young Basadzi Women of Poetry. Since then, she performed her poetry at corporate events, poem sessions, talent shows, and festivals. She also hosted her monthly poetry events which are called "1st Word Sessions" at the Bat Centre in Durban.

After high school, Gqulu performed her poems while trying to find a proper job. She was then employed at an art centre to teach school children arts. Gqulu's parents supported her career choice as they had no money to take her to university.

== Education ==
Busiswa matriculated in 2005 at Mowat Park High School in Durban. After matric she went to the University of KwaZulu-Natal where she did Bachelor of Laws and Bachelor of Commerce degrees. However, she could not complete her studies because of financial difficulties and chose to pursue a career in the arts.

== Career ==
=== 2011–2012: Career beginnings ===
While performing at live poetry readings, she met a befriend who introduced her to Sir Bubzin. Sir Bubzin invited her while producing the song "Syaphambana". He then suggested to feature her in performing her poems on the track. Gqulu and Sir Bubzin were later signed to Kalawa Record by the CEO, Oskido, after he heard the song. The song was later released on the first Kalawa Jazmee Dance compilation in 2011. Later that year, Gqulu was called by Oskido to record "My Name Is Busiswa" which was produced by DJ Zintle.

The collaboration resulted in a co-writing credit for Gqulu. After recording the song in 2011, she moved to Johannesburg in signing with Kalawa Jazmee Records. The song was a hit and It received extensive airplays in South African radio stations since its release. Gqulu got gigs in several countries, including Zimbabwe, Angola, and Namibia. The song earned nominees at the Channel O Africa Music Video Award including Most Gifted Dance Video and Video of the Year. The song scoped another nomination at the South African Music Award for Record of the Year.

=== 2013–2016: Ngoku and Clash of Choirs ===
"Ngoku" was released on 11 March 2013 as a non-album single on iTunes. The song was accompanied by a video released on YouTube. "Ngoku" became a dance hit with its catchy chorus. The track got several airplays and was commercially successful. Gqulu promoted the single by performing it on e.tv music show Club808, with Oskido. At the 2014 Channel O Africa Music Video Award, the song won Most Gifted Dance category and she performed the song later in the awards ceremony.

In November 2013, Gqulu released a single, "Lahla" featuring Dj Bucks and Uhuru. The song's video accumulated 1 million+ views on YouTube. Gqulu along with Dj Bucks, performed the song live on SABC1 music show Live Amp. She also performed the song at the 2015 Metro FM Awards.

In September 2016, Gqulu joined the fourth season of Clash of the Choirs, as a Choirmaster with Kelly Khumalo, Anele Mdoda, JR, Bucie, Sifiso Ncwane and IFANI. She was the choirmaster of the KwaZulu-Natal. Her team was eliminated after a battle with team Western Cape led by IFANI.

=== 2017–2019: Highly Flavoured and Summer Life ===
In August 2017, Gqulu announced that her debut album would be titled Highly Flavoured. Throughout the remainder of 2017, Gqulu was featured on several singles including Tipcee "Isichathulo" and Dj Maphorisa "Vuvushka" and "Midnight Starring". "Bazoyenza" was released as the lead single for the album. Gqulu released her debut album Highly Flavoured, which features DJ Maphorisa, Busi N, DJ Athie, Da Fre, DJ Toxic, Nokwazi, Moozlie, Lando and Yasirah. The album was nominated at the South African Music Awards for Best Kwaito Album and for Best Female Artist.

Gqulu officially announced her second studio album release, Summer Life, on her Instagram account; the album was released on 12 November 2018, independently, under Ngqulu new, own company Busiswa Entertainment. On 31 August, Prince Kaybee released "Banomoya" featuring Busiswa and TNS.

In 2019, Ngqulu received two nomination at the 25th South African Music Awards, in the Best Dance Album category for her critical acclaimed album Summer Life and Best Female Category. Also in 2019, Busiswa featured on Beyoncé's The Lion King: The Gift album, on the track "My Power".

=== 2020-Present: AmaPiano crossover and My Side Of The Story ===
In 2020, she collaborated with South African Amapiano musician, Gaba Cannal on the single Umhlaba Wonke. In that same year, she released her 3rd studio album titled My Side Of The Story which was built of AmaPiano songs, a departure from her dance and Gqom sounds also crossing over to AmaPiano. The album was supported by two singles, "Sbwl" which featured Kamo Mphela and "Makazi" in which she featured Mr JazziQ.

At the MTV Africa Music Awards, she received a nomination for Best Female act.

== Personal life ==
Gqulu spent her early years under the care and guidance of her late mother and grandmother who were a great influence in shaping her strong personality. On 8 November 2017, she revealed that she was pregnant on her Instagram account. On 8 January 2018, Gqulu gave birth to a son, Kgosi Lakhanya Gqulu.

In March 2021, her own-created documentary-reality show title "Her Majesty: Busiswa" premiered on BET Africa.

== Other ventures ==
In addition to her music and poetry, Busiswa also works for Art for Humanity (AFH) where she provides workshops for school children, as a means to help develop an appreciation for poetry and the visual arts. Gqulu also works with the Umlazi District Department of Education's Youth Development Office, tutoring learners on public speaking, debating and performance poetry.

== Accolades ==
Busiswa awards and nominations
Awards and nominations
Award	Wins	Nominations
South African Music Awards	0	2
Metro FM Awards	0	1
Channel O Africa Music Video	1	3
All Africa Music Awards	1	1
Mtv Africa Music Awards	0	1

Totals (Note: Certain award groups do not simply award one winner. They acknowledge several different recipients, have runners-up, and have third place. Since this is a specific recognition and is different from losing an award, runner-up mentions are considered wins in this award tally. For simplification and to avoid errors, each award in this list has been presumed to have had a prior nomination.)
- Wins: 4
- Nominations: 12

Busiswa's contribution to the South African music industry has garnered her multiple awards and nominations in several music award South African Music Awards, Metro FM Music Awards, the Channel O Music Video Awards and MTV Africa Music Award In 2012, she was named in the Mail and Guardian's Top 200 Young South Africans.

=== South African Music Awards ===
The South African Music Awards (also known as The SAMAs) are the Recording Industry of South Africa's music industry awards, established in 1995.

Year	Nominee / work	Award	Result
2012	My Name Is	Record of the year	Nominated
2018	Highly Flavored	Best Kwaito Album	Won
2018	Herself	Best Female Artist	Nominated
2019	Summer Life	Best Dance Album	Nominated
2019	Busiswa	Best Female artist	Nominated

=== Metro FM Awards ===
Metro FM Music Awards is an annual awards ceremony that was established in 2000 by Metro FM with the aim of offering its listeners to honour their favorite South African artists. Busiswa has received one award nominations.

Year	Nominee / work	Award	Result
2014	Visa	Best Music Video	Nominated

=== All Africa Music Awards ===
Year	Nominee / work	Award	Result
2015	Busiswa	Best Female (Southern Africa)	Won

=== Channel O Africa Music Video Award ===
First held in 2003 as Reel Music Video Awards, the Channel O Africa Music Video Awards are Pan-African music awards organised by South Africa-based television channel Channel O. Busiswa has won the award once.

Year	Nominee / work	Award	Result
2012	My Name Is	Most Gifted Dance category	Nominated
2012	My Name Is	Music Video of the year	Nominated
2013	Ngoku	Most Gifted Dance category	Won

=== MTV Africa Music Awards ===
The MTV Africa Music Awards were established in 2008 by MTV Networks Africa to celebrate the most popular contemporary music in Africa.

Year	Nominee / work	Award	Result
2015	Herself	Best Female	Nominated

=== Feather Awards ===
Year	Nominee / work	Award	Result
2019	Herself	Musician of the Year	Won

== Discography ==
- Highly Flavoured (2017)
- Summer Life (2018)
- My Side of the Story (2020)

=== As lead artist ===
List of singles as lead artist, with selected chart positions and certifications, showing year released and album name
Title	Year	Peak chart positions	Certifications	Album
Title	Year	ZA	Certifications	Album
"One Night Stand" (Busiswa, Professor)	2012	—		
"Lahla" (featuring DJ Buckz, Uhuru)	2014	—		
"Ingqondo"	2016	—		
"Bazoyenza" (featuring DJ Maphorisa)	2017	—		
"Majesty" (DJ Tunez, Busiswa)	2019	—		
"SBWL" (featuring Kamo Mphela)	2020	—		
"Right Thang" (Shirazee, Busiswa)	2020	—		
"—" denotes a recording that did not chart or was not released in that territory.

== See also ==
- List of awards and nominations received by Busiswa
- List of South African musicians
- List of African musicians
