= Vusi Nova =

South African singer (born 1984)

Snova (born Vusimuzi Nongxa; 4 May 1984), commonly known by his former name Vusi Nova, is a South African singer. Born and raised in New Brighton, Gqeberha, Nova relocated to Johannesburg in 1998 at the age of 14 to pursue his career in music and signed a record deal with Muthaland Records, released Walk Into Light (2013) and Did It For Love (2014).

== Career ==
Nova signed a record deal with EMI Records and released his first album Ndimfumene in 2009. In 2010, he joined RJ Benjamin for vocal lessons and met Oskido who signed him to Kalawa Jazmee. In 2012, Nova signed with Muthaland Entertainment and began to work on his debut studio album.

In 2013, his debut studio album Walk Into Light was released. It features Moneoa, Veezo, RJ Bejamin and Ishmael. In December 2014, Nova's album Did It For Love was released. At the 21st South African Music Awards, Did It For Love was nominated for Best RnB/Soul/Reggae Album.

In early 2016, his single "Thandiwe" was released and peak at number one on Most Shazamed song in Lesotho. In July 2016, his third studio album Naninina was released to critical acclaim. Naninina won Best Afro Album at 2017 South African Afro Music Awards and also Best African Pop Album, Best Styled Artist/Group and Best Produced Album at the 2017 Metro FM Awards. The album was certified platinum in South Africa.

"As'phelelanga" featuring South African poet Jessica Mbangeni was released on August 17, 2018.

That same month August 2018, his fourth album Mayan-Nyan was released. The album was certified gold with sales of 25 000 units after 2 months of its release. At 25th South African Music Awards, Mayan-Nyan was nominated for Album of the Year, Best Afro Pop Album and won Best Engineered Album of the Year.

In August 2020, Nova's single "Yibanathi" featuring Dumi Mkokstad was released as album's lead single, accompanied by music video. In January 2021, his studio album NguMama was released in South Africa. The album won Best Afro pop Album at 27th South African Music Awards.

In November 2021, his single "Shuku Shuku" was released. The song debuted at number 3 on Radio Monitor Charts.

In early January 2022, Nova began recording studio album AsphelelangeVol1 which is set to be released on March 4, 2022. By February, there were 49 songs already recorded, 8 of which were chosen to the final track listing.

His single "Ndincede" was released on May 5, 2022.

Following his exit with former record label Muthaland Entertainment, Nova established his recording label Nova Sounds in August 2023.

=== Television ===
In April 2021, he made his screen debut as judge on Amazing Voices season 2.

== Discography ==
=== Studio albums ===
- Walk Into Light (2013)
- Did It For Love (2014)
- Naninina (2016)
- Mayan-Nyan (2018)
- NguMama (2021)
- Ndikhethiwe (2022)
- Full Circle (2024)
- Promises (2025)

== Achievements ==
=== Metro FM Music Awards ===
Year	Nominee / work	Award	Result	Ref.
2026	Himself	Best Styled Artist	Pending	

=== SA Afro Music Awards ===
Year	Nominee / work	Award	Result	Ref.
2024		Best Male Afro Soul Artist Of Democracy	Pending	
2024	Ndikuthandile	Best Male Afro Song Of Democracy	Pending	
2024	Himself	Best Male Afro Artist Of Democracy	Pending	
