= Sanele Mathenjwa =

South African soccer player

Personal information
- Date of birth: 5 October 1995 (age 31)
- Place of birth: KwaMashu, South Africa
- Position: Midfielder

Youth career
- –2017: Lamontville Golden Arrows

Senior career*
Years	Team	Apps	(Gls)
2017–2021	Lamontville Golden Arrows	7	(0)
2021–2022	Black Leopards	15	(1)
- * Club domestic league appearances and goals as of 13 November 2022

Sanele Mathenjwa (born 5 October 1995) is a South African soccer player who last played as a midfielder for South African side Black Leopards. He was born in KwaMashu.
