= Parks of KwaZulu-Natal =

KwaZulu-Natal is one of the most diverse provinces in South Africa in terms of its fauna and flora. Many of its wide variety of ecosystems have been preserved as parks and reserves, which are popular tourist attractions. Ezemvelo KZN Wildlife is a governmental agency that maintains the wildlife conservation areas in the province.

KwaZulu-Natal is home to some of the most popular game reserves and national parks in Africa. But, the province also extends 360 miles (580 kilometers) along the coast. This means that it offers a combination of inland game viewing, deep-sea fishing, SCUBA diving and snorkeling.

== Public game parks and nature reserves ==
These are just some of the game parks and nature reserves in KwaZulu-Natal that are open to the public:

- Royal Natal National Park
- Burman Bush
- iSimangaliso Wetland Park (part of the Lubombo Transfrontier Conservation Area)
  - Mkuze Game Reserve
- Hluhluwe-Umfolozi Game Reserve – the oldest national park in Africa.
- Itala Game Reserve
- Phinda Resource Reserve
- uKhahlamba Drakensberg Park (part of the Maloti-Drakensberg Transfrontier Conservation Area)
- Oribi Gorge
- Empisini Nature Reserve
- Krantzkloof Nature Reserve
- New Germany Nature Reserve

== Wildlife ==
The main attraction to these parks and reserves is the wildlife species that can be found within them. These are best enjoyed on guided game drives and safaris, where a guide can provide information on the local predators, prey, fauna and flora.

South Africa is known for the Big 5, which comprises lion, elephant, rhinoceros, Cape buffalo and leopard. Other exciting species include the hippopotamus, giraffe, hyena, zebra, warthog, kudu and African wild dog. This area is also renowned for its wide array of birds. These include the martial eagle, secretarybird, African pygmy kingfisher, lilac-breasted roller and many more.

== Tourism ==
The game parks and reserves of KwaZulu-Natal are a major draw-card for tourists from all over South Africa and the world. This province also has an excellent infrastructure. Durban is its main metropolis and is home to the King Shaka International Airport.
