= The Voice of Africa (Kelly Khumalo album) =

2020 studio album by Kelly Khumalo

Studio album by Kelly Khumalo
- Released: 9 October 2020
- Genre: Afro pop
- Label: Universal Music
- Producer: Mondli Ngcobo; Asanda Mvana; Nduduzo Makhathini; Hubert Batundi Muisha

Kelly Khumalo chronology
Unleashed (2018)	The Voice of Africa (2020)	From a God to a King (2023)

Singles from The Voice of Africa
- 1. "Empini" Released: 19 June 2020; 2. "Undithatha Kancinci"; 3. "Esiphambanweni" Released: 11 September 2021

The Voice of Africa is the ninth studio album by South African singer Kelly Khumalo. It was released on 9 October 2020 by Universal Music. It was produced by Mondli Ngcobo.

The album was certified gold in South Africa.

== Background ==
On 13 February 2020, Kelly announced that she had started recording her ninth studio album on her Instagram account.

== Singles ==
"Empini" was released as album's lead single on 19 June 2020, as well as accompanying music video. The song peaked number one on South Africa Afro Pop Music charts.

"Esiphambanweni" featuring Hlengiwe Mhlaba was released on 11 September 2021, as the third single, peaked number one on South Africa Gospel charts.

== Commercial performance ==
The Voice of Africa (TVOA) was certified gold in South Africa on 20 May 2021.

Album track "Empini" was certified 4× platinum, "Esiphambanweni" 2× platinum, and "Ngathwala Ngaye" platinum.

== Track listing ==
The Voice of Africa track listing
No.	Title	Writer(s)	Length
1.	"Nok'khanya"		6:50
2.	"Kuyenyukela"		6:34
3.	"Empini"		4:49
4.	"Loshona Nini"		3:47
5.	"Undithatha Kancinci"	Asanda Mvana	4:22
6.	"Ngathwala Ngaye" (featuring Mondli Ngcobo)		4:28
7.	"Awazi Lutho"		4:31
8.	"Esphambanweni" (featuring Hlengiwe Mhlaba)		6:23
Total length:			42:00

== Personnel ==
Credits for The Voice of Africa are adapted from AllMusic.

- Asanda Mvana – composer, producer
- Kelly Khumalo – vocals, composer
- Nduduzo Makhathini – producer
- Mondli Ngcobo – composer, producer
- Hubert Batundi Muisha – producer

== Accolades ==
The Voice of Africa was nominated for Best Afro Pop Album at the 27th South African Music Awards.

Year	Nominee / work	Award	Result
2021	The Voice of Africa	Best Afro Pop Album	Nominated

== The Voice of Africa (Live) ==
The Voice of Africa

Live album by Kelly Khumalo
- Released: 12 November 2021
- Venue: Ster Kinekor, Rosebank
- Studio: Universal Music
- Genre: Afro pop
- Length: 51:00
- Producer: Mondli Ngcobo

The Voice of Africa is a live album by South African singer Kelly Khumalo. It was recorded at Ster Kinekor, Rosebank in November 2021.

The album incorporates elements of maskandi and traditional folk music, and gospel.

=== Track listing ===
Live edition track listing
No.	Title	Length
1.	"Nok'khanya"	5:58
2.	"Undithatha Kancinci"	3:32
3.	"Ngathwala Ngaye" (featuring Mondli Ngcobo)	5:44
4.	"Kuyenyukela"	5:58
5.	"Loshona Nini"	4:24
6.	"Awazi Lutho"	7:08
7.	"Esiphambanweni" (featuring Hlengiwe Mhlaba)	9:04
8.	"Empini"	9:20
Total length:		51:00

== Certifications ==
Certifications for The Voice of Africa
Region	Certification	Certified units/sales
South Africa (RISA)	Gold	10,000^{‡}
^{‡} Sales+streaming figures based on certification alone.

== Release history ==
List of release dates, showing region, formats, label, editions and reference
Region	Date	Format(s)	Label	Edition(s)	Ref.
South Africa	9 October 2020	CD; digital download	Universal Music	Standard	
