= Savannah Park Secondary School =

Location
- Savannah Park, Kwazulu-Natal, South Africa

Information
- School type: Public
- Motto: Hope In Hard Work
- Established: 1996; 29 years ago
- Principal: Mr AS Naicker
- Grades: R-12
- Colour(s): Royal Blue & Gold

Savannah Park Secondary School is a combined co-education public school in Savannah Park, KwaZulu-Natal, South Africa. Excellence and hard work are the spirits summed in Savannah Park Secondary School. With the motto "Hope in Hard Work," the school reminds its students that success is not far-reaching so long as determination, effort, and resilience are combined.

The School Colours: Royal Blue and Gold are symbolic of the guiding principles of loyalty, wisdom, and achievement. Royal Blue symbolizes the faithfulness of the school to trust and loyalty, and wisdom; the colour Gold represents the value achieved, excellence, and wealth of knowledge.

Savannah Park Secondary School was established in 1996, primarily serving previously disadvantaged students. The school is situated at 17 Pebble Drive, Savannah Park.

As of the current academic year, the school has an enrollment of approximately 1,500 pupils, spanning Grades 0-12. The school is led by Mr. A.S. Naicker, who has served as the Headmaster since its founding. The school's staff consists of around 50 members.

The badge includes the name Savannah Park Secondary School, a torch which represents the bright future the pupils attending should aim for, and a book which stands for education.

Savannah Park Secondary School offers the following subjects: Afrikaans (First Additional Language), English (Home Language), IsiZulu (Home Language & First Additional Language), Life Orientation, Mathematics, Mathematical Literacy, Physical Science, Life Sciences, History, Geography, Accounting, Business Studies, Economics, Engineering and Graphic Design, Tourism & Religious studies.
