= St Benedict School Pinetown =

Coordinates: 29.82060°S 30.85300°E

St Benedict School is a co-educational independent Catholic day school situated in Pinetown, KwaZulu-Natal (eThekwini Metropolitan Municipality). The school was founded in 1956 by the Missionary Sisters of the Precious Blood as a convent. The school accepts students ranging from pre-primary to grade 12. Since St Benedict School is independent, it subscribes to the IEB examinations of South Africa. Since 2012 there is a regular exchange with Missionsgymnasium St. Antonius Bardel in Germany.
