= Highly Flavoured =

Studio album by Busiswa
- Released: 8 December 2017
- Genre: Kwaito; gqom; dance
- Length: 50:21
- Label: Kalawa Jazmee Records; Universal Music
- Producer: DJ Maphorisa (also exec.); Oskido

Busiswa chronology
| Highly Flavoured (2017) | Summer Life (2018) |

Singles from Highly Flavoured
- 1. "Bazoyenza" Released: 11 January 2018

Highly Flavoured is the debut studio album by South African singer, poet and songwriter Busiswa. It was released on 8 December 2017 through Kalawa Jazmee. The album features guest appearances by artists DJ Maphorisa, Busi N, DJ Athie, Da Fre, DJ Toxic, Nokwazi, Moozlie, Lando and Yasirah. Primarily, Highly Flavoured is a gqom album.

The album received positive reviews from music critics. It was certified gold by the Recording Industry of South Africa (RiSA). It produced one single — "Bazoyenza".

== Critical reception ==
Professional ratings
Review scores
| Source | Rating |
|---|---|
| AllMusic | 4/5 stars |

== Release and promotion ==
In August 2017, Gqulu announced that her debut album will be entitled Highly Flavored. Throughout the remainder of 2017, Gqulu featured on several singles, including Tipcee's "Isichathulo" and DJ Maphorisa's "Vuvushka" and "Midnight Starring". "Bazoyenza" was released as the lead single off Highly Flavored.

== Accolades ==
| Year | Award ceremony | Prize | Result | Ref. |
|---|---|---|---|---|
| 2018 | 24th South African Music Awards | Best Kwaito Album | Won | |
| 2018 | 24th South African Music Awards | Female Artist of the Year | Nominated | |

== Track listing ==
Highly Flavoured — Standard edition
| No. | Title | Writer(s) | Producer(s) | Length |
|---|---|---|---|---|
| 1. | "Bazoyenza" | Busiswa; DJ Maphorisa | DJ Maphorisa | 4:51 |
| 2. | "Mr Party" (Busi N, DJ Athie and DJ Fresh) | DJ Athie; Busiswa; Da Fresh | DJ Fresh | 4:38 |
| 3. | "Syashelela" | Busiswa | Oskido | 4:26 |
| 4. | "Nonke" | Busiswa; Oskido | Oskido | 4:21 |
| 5. | "Ngibambe" (Nokwazi) | Busiswa | DJ Maphorisa | 4:56 |
| 6. | "Ingqondo" | Busiswa | Oskido | 5:61 |
| 7. | "Bad Galz" (Featuring Moozlie) | Busiswa; Moozlie | DJ Maphorisa | 3:53 |
| 8. | "Uthando Lwakho" (Featuring Londi) | Londi; Busiswa | Oskido | 3:59 |
| 9. | "Drop n ReWhine" | DJ Maphorisa; Busiswa | DJ Maphorisa | 3:51 |
| 10. | "We Travelled" | Busiswa | DJ Maphorisa | 4:20 |
| 11. | "Entara" | Busiswa | DJ Maphorisa | 6:15 |
| 12. | "Ilanga" (Featuring Yasirah Bhelz) | Yasirah Bhelz; Busiswa | DJ Maphorisa | 5:51 |
| 13. | "Welcome To Kalawa" | Oskido; Busiswa | Oskido | 4:40 |
| Total length: | | | | 50:21 |

== Certifications ==
| Region | Certification | Sales |
|---|---|---|
| South Africa (RiSA) | Gold | 15 000± |

== Personnel ==
Credits all adapted from AllMusic.

- Da Fresh - Featured Artist
- DJ Athie - Featured Artist
- DJ Maphorisa - Featured Artist
- Busiswa Gqulu - Primary Artist, Composer
- Rabelani Madula - Composer
- Nqobile Mahlangu - Composer
- Mihlali Mali - Composer
- Athanathi Mbilini - Composer
- Joyous Buthelezi Mdlongwa - Composer
- Moozlie - Featured Artist
- Tshepo William Mpinga - Composer
- Busi N - Featured Artist
- Busisiwe Ngwenya - Composer
- Nokwazi - Featured Artist
- Themba Sekowe - Composer
- Akona Sitani - Composer
- Sibusiso Sonti - Composer
- Thabo Tshepe - Composer
- Lando - Featured Artist
- Yasirah - Featured Artist

== Release history ==
List of release dates, showing region, formats, label, editions and reference
| Region | Date | Format(s) | Label | Edition(s) | Ref. |
|---|---|---|---|---|---|
| Various | 8 December 2018 | CD; digital download; Vinyl | Universal Music | Standard | |
