= Zakwe =

South African rapper

- Born: Ntokozo Zakwe; 8 March 1988 (age 38); KwaMashu, KwaZulu-Natal, South Africa
- Origin: Msinga, South Africa
- Genre: Hip Hop
- Occupations: Rapper; record producer; singer-songwriter
- Years active: 2011–present
- Labels: Mabala Noise (Former): Universal Music Group (Current); Sphethu Records (former); Native Rhythms (former)

Ntokozo Zakwe is a South African rapper born in KwaMashu, KwaZulu-Natal.

== Early life ==
Zakwe was born in the township of KwaMashu in KwaZulu-Natal. He went to Qhilika High School where he completed his matric and developed his passion for hip hop music. He then went to further his studies at the Durban University of Technology but due to financial difficulties he dropped out and chose to pursue his dream of becoming a musician.

== Career ==
His musical career began in early 2000's, performing in the streets of Kwa-Mashu and Msinga. Zakwe started releasing music as an underground artist, at this stage he released a number of vernacular mixtapes which were titled Street Music. The mixtapes were well received in the underground hip hop scene, this then led to two of his tracks within the tapes to eventually make it into Hype Sessions and thus received massive airplay.

After the success of his mixtapes, Zuluboy another Durban-based emcee, featured Zakwe on his track "Zobe Zisho" which led to Zakwe bagging a recording and artist management deal with Native Rhythms.

In 2011, he released his self-titled debut album Zakwe, which was a huge success and was certified gold status by the Recording Industry of South Africa (RISA), earning him five nominations at the South African Music Awards, He won the Metro FM Award for best Hip Hop artist and the first best Lyricist Award at the South African Hip Hop Awards (SAHHAs) the following year, thus taking his place amongst the best rappers in South Africa. The latter became the first Zulu hip hop album to earn gold status.

Zakwe's success and talent earned him endorsement deals with SAB Miller and Hennessy. He was one of the performing acts at the 2011 Metro FM awards in the province of Mpumalanga, he also was one of the live acts in the 2012 and 2013 South African Music Awards. In February 2013 he was the opening act for American rapper Kanye West at the Dome in Johannesburg, South Africa.

In 2015, he released Impande an album which became an instant hit and earned him three nominations at the South African Hip Hop Awards for Best Album, Best Male Artist and Best Lyricist, He won the Best Vernacular Hip Hop at the 12th South African Traditional Music Awards (SATMA) for the song "Reverse" featuring Duncan.

Zakwe released a hit single called "Sebentin" featuring Cassper Nyovest and Musiholiq in 2017 which received positive reviews. A remix of the song was released in the same year which featured Blaklez, Musiholiq, Cassper Nyovest, Kwesta, HHP and PRO. The remixed version of the song won the Remix of the Year at the 25th South African Music Awards.

On 6 July 2018, Zakwe released his third studio album titled Cebisa. The album was certified gold by the Recording industry of South Africa.

In early September 2020, he announced that his working on a collaborative studio album with Duncan.

On 4 December 2020, Zakwe and Duncan released their collaboration album titled Zakwe & Duncan.

The album features Kwesta, Assessa, Just Bheki, Kay Masta, Beast, Supreme, Lilly, Max Ov, K.O, DJ Tira, Qwabe Twins, and Riot.

Zakwe received a nomination for Artist of the Decade at the 2021 South African Hip Hop Awards.

== Discography ==
=== Studio albums ===
- Zakwe (2011)
- Zakwe (Delux Edition) (2012)
- Zakwe (Super Delux Edition) (2013)
- Impande (2015)
- Cebisa (2018)

=== Collaboration albums ===
- Zakwe & Duncan (2020)

=== As featured artist ===
List of singles as featured artist, with selected chart positions and certifications, showing year released and album name
Title	Year	Peak chart positions	Certifications	Album
Title	Year	ZA	Certifications	Album
"Bazokhulu" (Kelly Khumalo featuring Mthunzi, Zakwe)	2022	—		From a God to a King
"—" denotes a recording that did not chart or was not released in that territory.

== Accolades ==
=== Nominations ===
- Best Street Urban album during the 18th Annual MTN South African Music Awards (SAMA)
- Remix of the year for the remix of the song "Bathi Ng’yachoma" featuring Zuluboy and danger 18th Annual MTN South African Music Awards (SAMA)
- Album of the year for debut album ZAKWE 18th Annual MTN South African Music Awards (SAMA)
- Male artist of the year 18th Annual MTN South African Music Awards (SAMA)
- Newcomer of the year 18th Annual MTN South African Music Awards (SAMA)
- Best Album at the South African Hip Hop Awards (SAHHAs) – 2015
- Best Male Artist at the South African Hip Hop Awards (SAHHAs) – 2015
- Best Lyricist at the South African Hip Hop Awards (SAHHAs) – 2015

=== Awards ===
- Best Lyricist Award at the first South African Hip Hop Awards – 2012
- Best Hip Hop Artist at the Metro FM Awards – 2013
- Best Vernacular Hip Hop at the 12th South African Traditional Music Awards
- Best Remix of the year at the 25th South African Music Awards
