= Empini =

Single by Kelly Khumalo

from the album The Voice of Africa
- Released: June 19, 2020
- Recorded: 2020
- Studio: Universal Music
- Genre: Afro-Pop
- Length: 4:49
- Songwriter: Mondli Ngcobo
- Producer: Mondli Ngcobo

Kelly Khumalo singles chronology
| "Dance Comigo" (2018) | "Empini" (2020) | "Bazokhuluma" (2022) |

"Empini" is a song by South African singer Kelly Khumalo from her studio album, The Voice of Africa. It was released on June 19, 2020, as the lead single from the album. The song was written and produced by Mondli Ngcobo.

The song was certified 4× Platinum by the Recording Industry of South Africa (RiSA).

== Commercial performance ==
The song peaked number one on South Africa Afro Pop Music charts.

At 27th South African Music Awards, "Empini" was nominated for Record of the Year (fan-voted).

| Year | Nominee / work | Award | Result | Ref. |
|---|---|---|---|---|
| 2020 | "Empini" | Record Of The Year | Nominated | |

== Track listing ==
Digital download and streaming

1. "Empini" – 4:49

== Personnel ==
"Empini" credits are adapted from AllMusic.

- Kelly Khumalo – Vocals, Primary Artist, Composer
- Mondli Ngcobo – Composer, Producer

== Certifications ==
| Region | Certification | Certified units/sales |
|---|---|---|
| South Africa (RISA) | 4× Platinum | 80,000^{‡} |
^{‡} Sales+streaming figures based on certification alone.

== Release history ==
| Region | Date | Format | Version | Label | Ref. |
|---|---|---|---|---|---|
| South Africa | June 19, 2020 | Digital download | Original | Universal Music | |
