= Deborah Fraser =

South African gospel vocalist (1965–2022)

- Born: 9 June 1965; KwaMashu, Natal, South Africa
- Died: 15 May 2022 (aged 56); Johannesburg, Gauteng, South Africa
- Occupations: Singer; songwriter; actress
- Spouse: Sockey Okeke (m. 2007; div. 2008)
- Musical career
- Origin: Johannesburg
- Genres: Gospel; soul
- Instrument: Vocals
- Years active: 1985–2022
- Label: Universal

Dr. Deborah Marcia Fraser (9 June 1965 – 15 May 2022) was a South African gospel singer. She began her career in 1985 as a backing singer, before releasing her own album, Abanye Bayombona, in 2000, which sold over a million copies in South Africa.

Fraser's tenth studio album, Uhambo, was released in 2016 and included the hit single "Ngeke Ngiyeke Ukuthandaza".

She won the first South African Broadcasting Corporation (SABC) Crown Gospel Music award in the Best Female Artist category, as well as other awards including the SAMA for best gospel, Metro award for best gospel, and Kora for best gospel artist.

== Career ==
In 1984, Fraser relocated to Johannesburg and worked as a backup vocalist for Ladysmith Black Mambazo, Lucky Dube, Brenda Fassie, Rebecca Malope, Hugh Masekela, and Jonas Gwangwa.

Her first solo studio album, Abanye Bayombona, was released in 2000. Following the album's success, she was signed by Universal Music.

In September 2008, Fraser was a judge for the I Want to Sing Gospel competition. She also acted in the 2010 drama series Hola Mpinji!.

At the 23rd ceremony of South African Music Awards, her album Uhambo was nominated for Best Traditional Faith Album.

On 12 April 2019, she released another studio album, titled OkaJehova Akanqotshwa.

== Personal life ==
Fraser was married to Nigerian pastor Sockey Okeke. In October 2021, Fraser was honored by the Trinity International Bible University with a doctor of philosophy in the sacred space of music.

== Death ==
Fraser died at the age of 56 on 15 May 2022, at Chris Hani Baragwanath Academic Hospital, after suffering a stroke.

== Discography ==
=== Studio albums ===
List of studio albums
| Title | Album details |
|---|---|
| Bring Mr Back My Love (Hot Soul singers) | Released: 1987 |
| Rhythm on Fire | Released: 1990 |
| Umagubane (Chicco Twala production) | Released: 1997 |
| Mbulali Wami (with Maria le Maria) | Released: 1999 |
| Abanye Bayombona | Released: 2000 |
| Born Again | Released: 2001 |
| Udlalile Ngabantu | Released: 2003 |
| Ngikuxolele | Released: 2004 |
| Giloria | Released: 2005 |
| Isililo | Released: 2007 |
| Umsamaria | Released: 2008 |
| Deborah Live | Released: 2009 |
| Uthando | Released: 2009 |
| Awunasabelo | Released: 2010 |
| Umqhele | Released: 2013; Format: digital download, CD |
| Thanksgiving | Released: 2015; Format: digital download, CD |
| Uhambo | Released: 26 February 2016 |
| OkaJehova Akanqotshwa | Released: 12 April 2019; Format: digital download, CD |
| Jehovah Ngiyabonga | Released: 19 May 2023; Format: digital download, streaming |
