= From a God to a King =

Studio album by Kelly Khumalo
- Released: 23 April 2023
- Recorded: 2021–2023
- Length: 34:15
- Label: Universal Music South Africa
- Producer: Mondli Ngcobo

Kelly Khumalo chronology
The Voice of Africa (2020)	From a God to a King (2023)

Singles from From a God to a King
- 1. "Bazokhuluma" Released: 4 November 2022

From a God to a King is the tenth studio album by South African singer Kelly Khumalo, released on 14 February 2023 through Universal Music South Africa. Production was handled by Mondli Ngcobo.

== Release and promotion ==
The Standard edition of From a God to a King was released on 14 February 2023.

To further promote the album Khumalo performed her first annual Gospel Explosion Concert from 15–16 April at Johannesburg's Lyric Theatre.

On 28 April, following the success of the two dates, she added one more date that was held at Vaal on 28 May.

In late August 2022, Kelly announced the From a God to a King tour, which began on 17 September, Carnival City, Boksburg.

The album's lead single, "Bazokhuluma" featuring Zakwe and Mthunzi was released on 4 November 2022.

From a God to a King's deluxe edition was released on 31 May 2024.

== Track listing ==
From a God to a King track listing
No.	Title	Length
1.	"Akathintwa"	5:15
2.	"Uzoma"	4:13
3.	"Ngisize" (featuring Sbu Soule)	4:42
4.	"Uyathandwa"	4:59
5.	"Mina Nawe" (featuring Mondli Ngcobo)	3:29
6.	"Isivikelo" (featuring Mbuso Khoza)	5:53
7.	"Bazokhuluma" (featuring Zakwe and Mthunzi)	5:44
Total length:		34:15

Deluxe edition bonus tracks
No.	Title	Length
8.	"Amazwi"	4:02
9.	"Ngibambe"	4:51
10.	"Emaweni"	4:50
Total length:		47:58

== Personnel ==
Credits for From a God to a King are adapted from AllMusic.

- Kelly Khumalo - Composer, Primary Artist, Vocals
- Mbuso Khoza - Composer, Primary Artist, Vocals
- Mondli Ngcobo - Composer, Musical Producer, Primary Artist, Producer, Vocals
- Mthunzi - Primary Artist, Vocals
- Mthunzi Ndimande - Composer
- Ntokozo Zakwe - Composer
- Sbu Soule - Primary Artist, Vocals
- Sibusiso Nkwanyana - Composer
- Zakwe - Primary Artist, Rap

== Awards ==
From a God to a King received two nominations for Female Artist of the Year and Best Afro-Pop Album at 29th South African Music Awards.

Year	Nominee / work	Award	Result
2023	From a God to a King	Female Artist of the Year	Nominated
2023	From a God to a King	Best Afro-Pop Album	Nominated

== Release history ==
List of release dates, showing region, formats, label, editions and reference
Region	Date	Format(s)	Label	Edition(s)	Ref.
South Africa	14 February 2023	Digital download; Streaming	Universal Music	Standard	
South Africa	31 May 2024	Digital download; Streaming	Universal Music	Deluxe	
