= New Germany Nature Reserve =

Nature reserve in South Africa

- Location within KwaZulu-Natal
- Location: New Germany, South Africa
- Coordinates: 29°48′42″S 30°53′14″E
- Area: 110 ha (270 acres)
- Governing body: eThekwini Metropolitan Municipality

New Germany Nature Reserve is a protected area of coastal grassland and forest overlooking the suburb of New Germany outside of Pinetown, KwaZulu-Natal, South Africa. The reserve consists of a nature park featuring a walk-through aviary and snake display, and grasslands to the south of the park which can be explored on foot.

The reserve is home to a number of bird species, including the Natal robin and purple-crested Turaco. Small mammals such as the blue and common duiker, impala, and mongoose are also found in the reserve.

== History ==
The reserve was demarcated as a common for the grazing of livestock and gathering of firewood by German settlers who arrived in the area in 1848.
