= Cowies Hill =

Cowie's Hill
- Location within KwaZulu-Natal Location within South Africa
- Coordinates: 29°49′40″S 30°53′33″E
- Country: South Africa
- Province: KwaZulu-Natal
- Municipality: eThekwini
- Main Place: Pinetown

Area
  - Total: 1.51 km^{2} (0.58 sq mi)

Population (2011)
  - Total: 1,341
  - Density: 888/km^{2} (2,300/sq mi)

Racial makeup (2011)
  - Black African: 20.9%
  - Coloured: 2.2%
  - Indian/Asian: 3.0%
  - White: 73.2%
  - Other: 0.7%

First languages (2011)
  - English: 75.6%
  - Zulu: 12.4%
  - Afrikaans: 8.1%
  - Sotho: 1.4%
  - Other: 2.6%
- Time zone: UTC+2 (SAST)

Cowie's Hill is a small upmarket residential suburb of Pinetown in KwaZulu-Natal, South Africa. Its eponymous hill is a major feature in the Comrades Marathon which is held between Durban and Pietermaritzburg every year.

Cowie's Hill was originally established as farm land and was inhabited by the mayor of Pinetown and his family due to its position overlooking Pinetown. It is situated approximately 15 km off the coast line.

Cowie's Hill was the site of a farm known as Buffelskop (Buffalo Head) owned by William Cowie in the latter part of the 19th century.
