= Jub Jub (musician) =

South African rapper

Molemo Katleho Maarohanye (known professionally as Jub Jub; born 29 June, 1980) is a South African media personality and a successful hip hop artist and TV Host of popular shows such as Uyajola 9/9, You Promised to Marry Me, and Uthando Noxolo which air on Mojalove DSTV Channel 157.

== Biography ==
Jub Jub was a child star, discovered in 1991 when participating in a popular Coca-Cola TV advertisement that featured footballer Doctor Khumalo. He went on to present multiple TV shows such as Jam Alley, Channel O and Selimathunzi. Before he was convicted of culpable homicide for the death of four children in December 2012, he was one of the highest selling rappers in South Africa, having achieved platinum status for his albums "Rare Breed" and "My Shine". He is the son of businesswoman Jackie Maarohanye. Jub Jub currently hosts the reality show, Uyajola 9/9 which focuses on exposing cheating partners and spouses. He also released a remake of his "Ndikokhele" hit in 2020, and a remake of the popular Umbedesho "Ngi thembe wena" in 2021.

Following his release from prison in January 2017, Jub Jub vowed to turn his life around. Shortly after his release, the musician released a song called "Ke Kopa Tshwarelo" (Please forgive me) featuring Tshepo Tshola. As of 2019, he has made several TV appearances and is currently the host of the Moja Love reality show, Uyajola 9/9.

== Court cases ==
On 8 March 2010 he and his friend Themba Tshabalala caused a serious accident when they were drag racing under the influence of hard drugs on a public road near a school. Four children were killed, and another two survived with brain damage. On 5 December 2012, both were sentenced to 25 years in jail each for murder, attempted murder, and three related offences. An appeal was heard on 7 February 2014. On 8 October 2014 Jub Jub and Tshabalala's murder conviction was overturned to culpable homicide in a high court in Johannesburg. Their sentences were reduced from 25 years to 10 years, starting from 2012. On 5 January 2017 he was released on parole after serving 4 years, one month, and one day of his sentence; Tshabalala was also released on parole the same day.

In June 2026, Jub Jub was arrested for pointing and discharging a firearm at an e-hailing driver. It is alleged the driver was dropping a female passenger at a residence when the confrontation happened. The court heard that his case would be a Schedule 5 offense because of his previous conviction.

== Personal life ==
In a 2016 interview with MTV Base, Jub Jub's ex-girlfriend, fellow South African artist Kelly Khumalo, accused Jub Jub of physically abusing her. Khumalo claimed that during Jub Jub's 2010 arrest for a drag racing incident, she was "dealing with a partner who [was] going through a very serious case, who was also very abusive, emotionally and physically". Jub Jub has denied the accusations. Khumalo revealed in June 2019 she does not allow Jub Jub to see his son. In 2021, his ex-girlfriend, Amanda du-Pont accused him of having raped her during their relationship over a decade ago. This followed an interview that was conducted by Jub Jub on "Podcast and Chill with MacG" where he said he slept with her.
