= Summer Life =

Album by South African recording artist, singer-songwriter Busiswa

Studio album by Busiswa
- Released: 9 November 2018
- Recorded: April–October 2018
- Genre: Gqom; dance music; house
- Length: 46:02
- Label: Busiswa Entertainment
- Producer: Busiswa

Busiswa chronology
Highly Flavored (2017)	Summer Life (2018)	My Side Of The Story (2020)

Singles from Summer Life
- 1. "Ndiyi Lantombi" Released: 28 November 2018

Summer Life is the second studio album by South African recording artist, singer-songwriter Busiswa.

The album features contributions from guest artists, including Uhuru, Dladla Mshunqisi, Cruel Boyz, KayGee The Vibe, Zingah, LaSoulMates, DJ Buckz and Gorna.

== Background ==
Following the release of her fourth studio album Highly Flavoured (2017), Busiswa gave birth to her first child, Lukhanyo Gqulu on 8 January 2018. She took a hiatus from music in 2018 to focus on her new baby.

Gqulu announced on her social media that the album would be released on 9 November 2018, sharing the artwork of the album.

== Composition ==
Summer Life is a Gqom album that incorporates elements of House Music and Kwaito.

== Critical reception ==
Sabelo Mkhabela of OkayAfrica wrote that "Busiswa is back with her second album, a year after her debut Highly Flavoured. Fittingly titled Summer Life, the new album spans 10 tracks, and, as you'd expect, will make it impossible for you to listen without shaking parts of your body. Sonically, Summer Life leans towards gqom..."

== Promotion ==
Gqulu made several television appearances and live performances in support of the album. On 9 November 2018, on the release Busiswa performed live on Live Amp. Busiswa also made appearance on uMhlobo Wenene FM radio to promote the album.

== Accolades ==
Year	Nominee / work	Award	Result
2019	Summer Life	Best Kwaito/Gqom/AmaPiano Album	Nominated
2019	Busiswa	Female Artist Of The Year	Nominated
2019	Summer Life	Remix Of The Year	Nominated

== Track listing ==
No.	Title	Length
1.	"Summer Life" (feat DJ Buckz & Gorna)	3:53
2.	"Chesa Mpama" (feat LaSoulMates)	6:09
3.	"uWrongo" (feat. RudeBoyz)	4:38
4.	"Shikisha" (feat Uhuru)	4:45
5.	"Nyan Nyan" (feat Zingah)	5:04
6.	"iSdudla" (feat Dladla Mshunqisi)	4:53
7.	"Jam" (feat Da Fresh, Athi & LaSoulMates)	4:24
8.	"Goduka" (feat Cruel Boyz)	4:53
9.	"Weh DJ" (feat KayGee The Vibe)	6:22
10.	"Ndiyi Lantombi (Outro)"	1:35
Total length:		46:02
