= Gaba Cannal =

South African music producer and DJ

- Born: Khaka Yena; Daveyton, South Africa
- Origin: Eastern Cape, South Africa
- Genres: House; Amapiano
- Occupations: Record producer; DJ
- Instruments: Piano, keyboard, vocals
- Years active: 2015–present
- Label: Gaba Cannal Music Pty-Ltd

Khaka Yena, known commonly by his stage name Gaba Cannal, is a South African music producer and DJ. His music production is known for his soulful house take on Amapiano. His name "Gaba Cannal" when roughly translated into Portuguese, means "Let It Be".

== Early life and education ==
Gaba Cannal was born in Daveyton, Gauteng but he later moved to the east of Johannesburg, where he completed his schooling and ventured into music production. He Studied at Siyalakha Christian School then later moved to the east of Johannesburg where he grew up and finished matric in Fumana High School.

His parents are from a small village in Tsolo, Eastern Cape.

== Career ==
He started producing music at the age of eighteen and started out his music career as a hip hop producer and a pianist. In 2014, he released his EP titled, Abundance which opened ways for him in the industry and in that same year he created his own independent record label, Gaba Cannal Music Pty-Ltd.

In 2018, he was featured on the single Magic by Da Kruk, which was nominated in the 2018 South African Music Awards, for Best Underground Record of the Year.

In 2020, he collaborated with South African singer, Busiswa on his single Umhlaba Wonke. That same year, he released his album, Amapiano Legacy. In August 2020, his single Hold On ranked No. 10 on Good Hope FM's SA House Music Top 10 Chart.

He has performed on stages alongside local musicians such as Vinny Da Vinci, DJ Ganyani, Nastee Nev, DJ Clock, LinQ, MFR Souls, Giggs Superstar, KoJo Akusa, Mzee, Julian Gomes, Javaman, The Brawl, Noxolo, Mobi Dixon, Jenerik Soul, Tim White, DJ Christos, Tokzen Mthi and DJ Terrance, as well as international acts such as Ralf GUM, Andy Campton and Nick Holder and also toured in countries such as Eswatini.

On 25 November 2020, he revealed the release date for his upcoming album Statement and the official cover art for the project.

== Awards and nominations ==
Year	Award ceremony	Prize	Result
2018	Dance Music Awards South Africa	Best Underground Record of the Year	Nominated

== Discography ==
- Abundance EP (2014)
- Between Emotions EP (2018)
- Injabulo EP (2018)
- Suit And Tie II EP (2019)
- Amapiano Love Affair (2020)
- Amapiano Legacy (2020)
- Suit & Tie Episode III EP (2020)
- Great I Am (2020)
- Visionary Episode 1 (2021)
- Agape (2022)
- Deepest Gratitude (2022)
- Thetha Nabo Mfundisi (2023)
