= Jessica Mbangeni =

South African poet (1977–2024)

- Born: 22 August 1977; Nqamakwe, Eastern Cape, South Africa
- Origin: Johannesburg
- Died: 31 August 2024 (aged 47)
- Occupations: Actress; poet; singer
- Instrument: Vocals
- Years active: 2002–2024
- Label: Kwantu Entertainment
- Formerly of: Soweto Gospel Choir

Dr. Bishop Jessica Thembela Mbangeni (22 August 1977 – 31 August 2024) was a South African praise poet and singer. Born and raised in Nqamakwe, Eastern Cape, she rose to prominence after participating on Soweto Gospel Choir in 2002.

Mbangeni had also pursued an acting career. In 2013, Mbangeni made her on-screen feature debut in Zabalaza, and appeared as a guest on the television series Skeem Saam. Other television series Mbangeni appeared in included eKasi: Our Stories (2015), The Coconuts, and Dube on 2.

== Background ==
Jessica Mbangeni was born in Nqamakwe, Eastern Cape on 22 August 1977. Mbangeni attended Eastern Cape Technikon, but dropped out to pursue her career in music.

Mbangeni died on 31 August 2024, at the age of 47.

== Career ==
Shortly after Mbangeni left tertiary, she relocated to Johannesburg to search for job.

In 2002, she joined Soweto Gospel Choir and toured around the globe.

Two years later in 2005, Mbangeni pursued her career as a poet.

Towards the end of the August 2014, Mbangeni announced released date of her live album IGoli which was performed live at Lyric Theatre. The album was released on 26 September 2014.

Her studio album Busiswe Tribute to African Heroines was released in 2015.

Mbangeni was featured on "As'phelelanga" a single by South African singer Vusi Nova released on 17 August 2018.

=== Television ===
From 2004 to 2006, Mbangeni made on screen debut on Dube on 2 comedy television series.

In 2015, she portrayed a role of Nambasa on eKasi: Our Stories drama series.

=== Other ventures ===
Mbangeni established her agency KwaNtu Entertainment and Designs Agency in 2006.

== Discography ==
- Igoli (2014)
- Busiswe Tribute to African Heroines (2015)
- I Am an African (A Cappella) (2022)
- I Am an African (2022)
- World Peace (2024)

== Singles ==
List of singles, showing year released and album name
Title	Year	Album
"In Love with a Rasta Man" (Omar Morrison, Jessica Mbangeni)	2018	Non-album singles
"Africa" (Andreas Horvat remixes)	2021	Non-album singles
"The Sage In Me (Riddim)"	2022	Non-album singles
"Dawning of the Dawn" (featuring Dr Kaden Lebray)	2023	World Peace
"Ibuyile"	2023	World Peace

== Awards ==
Organization	Year	Category	Nominated work	Result	Ref.
South African Music Awards	2017	Best Praise Poet	Herself	Won	
South African Music Awards	2018	Best Traditional Album	iGoli Live at the Lyric Theatre	Won	
Basadi in Music Awards	2024	Traditional Artist of the Year	"Lashonilanga"	Pending	
