= M19 =

M19, M.19, or M-19 most commonly refers to:

- May 19th Communist Organization (M19), an American far-left female-led group active during the 1970s–1980s
- 19th of April Movement (M-19), a former Colombian guerrilla movement and political party 1970–1990

M19, M.19, or M-19 may also refer to:

== In science ==
- Messier 19 (M19), a globular cluster in the constellation Ophiuchus

== In transportation ==
- M-19 (Michigan highway), a state highway in Michigan, U.S.
- M19 (East London), a Metropolitan Route in East London, South Africa
- M19 (Cape Town), a Metropolitan Route in Cape Town, South Africa
- M19 (Johannesburg), a Metropolitan Route in Johannesburg, South Africa
- M19 (Pretoria), a Metropolitan Route in Pretoria, South Africa
- M19 (Durban), a Metropolitan Route in Durban, South Africa
- M19 (Bloemfontein), a Metropolitan Route in Bloemfontein, South Africa
- M19 (Port Elizabeth), a Metropolitan Route in Port Elizabeth, South Africa
- M19 expressway (Hungary)
- M19 road (Zambia), a short road in Zambia

== In firearms and military equipment ==
- M19 mine, a United States anti-tank mine
- Smith & Wesson Model 19 (S&W M19), a Smith & Wesson revolver
- Mk 19 grenade launcher, a belt-fed automatic grenade launcher
- M.19, an internal Fokker designation for the Fokker D.III, a 1916 German single-seat fighter aircraft
- M19 mortar
- M19 tank transporter
- M19 gun motor carriage
- M19 Maschinengranatwerfer – a German mortar used during WW2
