= Dumi Mkokstad =

South African singer-songwriter

Mdumiseni Nzimande, widely recognised by his stage name Dumi Mkokstad, is a South African singer-songwriter. He was born in Cabazana, Mount Ayliff, and grew up in Kokstad, where his passion for music was sparked at the age of nine.

His studio album Calvary, was released on 13 April 2020. It won Best Traditional Faith Music Album at the 26th South African Music Awards.

Mkokstad ninth studio album The Overflow Gcwala Kimi, was released on 25 December 2023. The album won Best Traditional Faith Album at the 29th ceremony of South African Music Awards.

Mkokstad received the most nominations for Best Gospel Album, Best Live Recording, Best Collaboration, Best Male, and won Best Gospel Songwriter for "Vumbelimnandi" at the 16th edition of the Crown Gospel Music Awards.

== Discography ==
=== Studio albums ===
- Dumi Mkokstad (2003)
- Ngivumele (2004)
- Hamba Mphefumlo (2005)
- Angikamboni (2006)
- Kubo Bonke (2009)
- Mbize UJesu (2014)
- Ukhona Uthixo (2015)
- Egameni LikaJesu (2017)
- Calvary (2020)
- The Overflow Gcwala Kimi (2022)

=== Extended plays ===
- Songs From Spirit of Praise (2021)

=== As lead artist ===
List of singles as lead artist, with selected chart positions and certifications, showing year released and album name
Title	Year	Peak chart positions	Certifications	Album
Title	Year	ZA	Certifications	Album
"Thixo Ndiyabulela (Remixed Version)"	2015	—		
"My God Is Too Much"	2018	—		
"Kwanele Manje (Artists In Activism)" (Khaya Mthethwa, Brian Temba, Dumi Mkokstad)	2019	—		
"Ungayeki Ukuthandaza"	2019	—		
"Ziphozenkosi"	2020	—		
"Ngeke Kuhlale kunje" (featuring Thulani (The motivator))	2023	—		
"—" denotes a recording that did not chart or was not released in that territory.
