= Clermont, KwaZulu-Natal =

Clermont
- Location within KwaZulu-Natal Location within South Africa
- Coordinates: 29.78333°S 30.9°E
- Country: South Africa
- Province: KwaZulu-Natal
- Municipality: eThekwini

Area
  - Total: 6.94 km^{2} (2.68 sq mi)

Population (2011)
  - Total: 52,075
  - Density: 7,500/km^{2} (19,400/sq mi)

Racial makeup (2011)
  - Black African: 99.5%
  - Coloured: 0.1%
  - Indian/Asian: 0.1%
  - Other: 0.2%

First languages (2011)
  - Zulu: 68.8%
  - Xhosa: 20.3%
  - Sotho: 5.2%
  - English: 1.7%
  - Other: 4.0%
- Time zone: UTC+2 (SAST)
- Postal code (street): 3610

Clermont is a township of Durban in KwaZulu-Natal, South Africa.

Clermont under the apartheid days was a black middle income township. Its immediate surroundings include KwaDabeka to the north, New Germany to the west, Westville to the south and Reservoir Hills to the east. Its main road is called Clermont road and is named after Sir Clermont, a farmer who sold his land. It was the only place in Durban where black people were able to buy property and build houses. Since the end of apartheid Clermont has been sprawling with shacks as people from the rural areas come and seek work opportunities in the nearby suburbs of Westville and New Germany, Pinetown and Durban.

Clermont has a large FM St.John Apostolic Faith Mission, Anglican, Catholic and Wesleyan Church community and on Sundays one can see the women of each denomination wearing their church uniforms.

== Notable residents ==
- Nonkululeko Nyembezi-Heita - business executive in steel, former director of ArcelorMittal South Africa telecommunications and finance. Since March 2014, she has been CEO of the Dutch mining group, IchorCoal N.V., board chairperson of Alexander Forbes Group Holdings
- Baleka Mbete - Speaker of the National Assembly of South Africa from May 2014 to May 2019
- Eric Mtshali - Anti-Apartheid activist, former Member of Parliament of South Africa & former South African Communist Party National Executive Committee member
- Muzi Mthabela - Actor, famously known for playing the role of Duma on Isibaya
- Msawawa - Kwaito artist, songwriter, and businessman
- Phumzile Mlambo-Ngcuka - Deputy President of South Africa from 2005 to 2008, Executive Director of UN Women with the rank of Under-Secretary-General of the United Nations
- BB Cele (1903–1993), South African educator, school inspector, editor of *UmAfrika*, and civic leader in Clermont.
