= Wyebank =

Settlement in KwaZulu-Natal, South Africa

- Location within KwaZulu-Natal Location within South Africa
- Coordinates: 29.77380°S 30.88150°E
- Country: South Africa
- Province: KwaZulu-Natal
- Municipality: eThekwini
- Main Place: Kloof
- Time zone: UTC+2 (SAST)

Wyebank is a settlement located 27 km north-west of Durban, KwaZulu-Natal, South Africa and forms part of the eThekwini Metropolitan Municipality which is the greater Durban metropolitan area. It is surrounded by Ngqungqulu in the north, KwaDabeka in the east, New Germany in the south and Kloof in the west.

As of 2001, Wyebank has a population of 1,977 people, which is equal to 735.20 people per km².

International disc jockey DJ Lag attended the local high school Wyebank Secondary School.
