= Kelly Khumalo =

South African singer (1982)

- Nonhlanhla
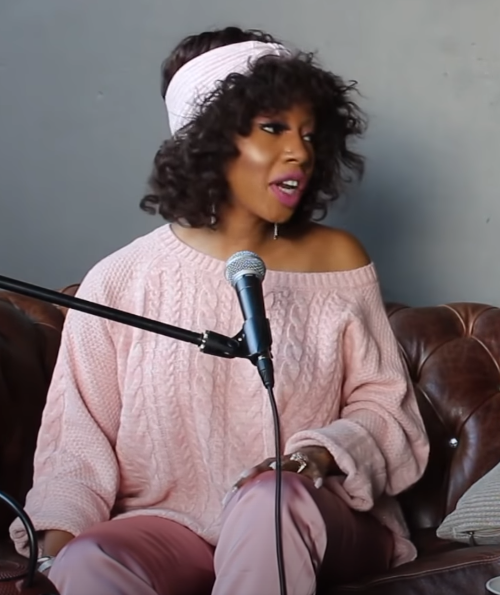
- Khumalo on a Podcast & Chill With MacG interview
- Born: Kelly Nonhlanhla Khumalo; 11 November 1984 (age 41); Vosloorus, Gauteng, South Africa
- Other name: Voice of Africa
- Occupations: Singer-songwriter; actress; TV personality
- Years active: 2004–present
- Television: Life with Kelly Khumalo Rhythm City Zulu Wedding
- Partner(s): Senzo Meyiwa (until his death; 2014) Jub Jub (until; 2011) Chad da Don
- Children: 3

Kelly Nonhlanhla Khumalo (born 11 November 1984) is a South African singer, actress, and television personality. She was Born in Vosloorus and later moved to Nquthu, KwaZulu-Natal, where she grew up.

Khumalo was discovered while performing at a gospel talent search and signed a record deal with Bonsai Entertainment, released her début studio album, T.K.O (2005). She shot to fame after the release of her début album, T.K.O (2005). She was named the Best Newcomer of 2005 in the Afro Pop music circuit. The Past, the Present, the Future album was released in November 2012. In May 2013, She scooped an award at the 19th South African Music Awards.

Khumalo's ninth album, The Voice of Africa (2020), which incorporated elements of R&B, gospel and Afro pop. The album was certified gold in South Africa.

== Life and career ==
Kelly Khumalo was born in Katlehong and moved to KwaZulu-Natal. She relocated to Gauteng in 1997.

=== T.K.O (2005), Itshitshi (2006) ===
Kelly's début solo album T.K.O was released on 19 August 2005, in South Africa, and earned her two nominations, Song of the Year and Best Afro Pop Album at the 2006 South African Music Awards.

On 27 September 2006, her second studio album Itshitshi was released.

=== The Past, The Present, The Future (2012), Back to My Roots (2014), My Truth (2016), Unleashed (2018) ===
On 5 November 2012, The Past, The Present, The Future album was released in South Africa. At the 19th SAMA awards (2013) her album The Past, The Present, The Future was nominated for Best Maskandi Album, Album of the Year, Best African Adult Album and won the Best Female Artist of the Year award.

In October 2014, the single "Asine" was released and nominated for Song of The Year at Metro FM Awards (2015), and her album, Back to my Roots for Best African Pop Album and nominated for Best African Adult Album at South African Music Awards XXXI (2015).

Kelly began recording her seventh studio album in March 2016. On 28 October 2016, her seventh studio album My Truth was released. My Truth won Best Female Album at 2017 Metro FM Awards.

In January 2018, Kelly began to work on her eighth studio album, and released its lead single "Jehovah" on 9 July 2018, featuring J F.L.O.

On 9 October, she announced second single "Dance Comigo" on her Instagram, which was released on 12 October 2018.

On 5 November 2018, her album Unleashed was released in South Africa. The album was produced by Mondli Ngcobo.

=== 2020–present: The Voice of Africa, Gospel Explosion Concert, From a God to a King ===
On 28 August, her single "Empini" was released as the album's lead single. The song was certified gold by the Recording Industry of South Africa with sales of 80 000 units and garnered 12 million views on YouTube. Her ninth studio album The Voice of Africa was released on 9 October 2020. Production was handled by Mondli Ngcobo. The Voice of Africa was certified gold with sales of 25 000 units in South Africa. At the 6th ceremony of All Africa Music Awards, her single "Empini" received nomination for Best Female Artist in South Africa.

"Esiphambaweni" featuring South African singer Hlengiwe Mhlaba, peaked number one in the gospel charts. At the 27th South African Music Awards, The Voice of Africa received a nomination as Best Afro-pop Album.

In November 2021, she recorded The Voice of Africa live version.

In April 2022, Khumalo performed at her first annual Gospel Explosion Concert, which included two dates, 15-16 April held at the Lyric Theatre in Johannesburg.

On 28 April, following the success of two dates, she added one more date that was held at Vaal on 28 May.

In late August 2022, Kelly announced the From a God to a King tour, scheduled to start off on Saturday 17 September at Carnival City, Boksburg.

Khumalo also announced her 10th album, From a God to a King. "Bazokhuluma" featuring Zakwe and Mthunzi was released on 4 November 2022, as the album's lead single. The album was released on 14 February 2023.

=== Television ===
In 2021, she started her reality show Life with Kelly Khumalo airs on Showmax. In September 2021, she appeared on House of Zwide, television soapie airs on eTV.

In September 2021, Khumalo was announced as Judge on Stand Up S.A.

Towards the end of 2021, she was a guest judge on Idols South Africa season 17.

In early April 2022, she was announced as a competitor on Tropika Island of Treasure, season 10.

=== Controversies ===
On 26 October 2014, her boyfriend Senzo Meyiwa, former captain of the South Africa national football team and club side Orlando Pirates, with whom she has a child, was shot dead in her presence at her family's home in Vosloorus. It is alleged that the killer is known to Khumalo and everyone present at the shooting, but she has remained silent on whom the killer is.

In October 2020, five men were charged with murdering Meyiwa. The suspects denied that they were involved in the killing. It was also found that Kelly was communicating with one of the suspects through cellphone before and after the death of Senzo Meyiwa.

In January 2025, news broadcaster eNCA reported Khumalo's death erroneously, after mixing up the artist with singer Winnie Khumalo, who had recently passed away. Khumalo criticized the broadcaster on social media after the error.

== Personal life ==
Speaking out about having been in an abusive relationship, in 2012 Khumalo became an advocate against domestic violence. She confessed to being a drug addict for at least two years during her relationship with the singer Molemo Maarohanye; she attended Narcotics Anonymous meetings.

== Discography ==
=== Studio albums ===
List of studio albums
Title	Album details	Certifications
TKO	Released: 2005; Format: digital download, CD	
Itshitshi	Released: 2006; Format: Digital download, CD	
Siyajabula	Released: 2007; label: Universal Music South Africa; Format: Digital download, CD	
Simply Kelly	Released: 2008; Format: Digital download, CD	
The Past, The Present, The Future	Released: 2012; label: Universal Music South Africa; Format: Digital download, CD	
Back to My Roots	Released: 2014; Format: Digital download, CD	
My Truth	Released: 2017; Label: Universal Music South Africa; Format: Digital download, CD	
Unleashed	Released: 2018; Label: Universal Music South Africa; Format: Digital download, CD	
The Voice of Africa	Released: 9 October 2020; Label: Universal Music South Africa; Format: Digital download, CD, streaming	RISA: Gold
From a God to a King	Released: 14 February 2023; Label: Universal Music South Africa; Format: Digital download, CD, streaming	

=== Singles ===
List of singles as lead artist, with selected chart positions and certifications, showing year released and album name
Title	Year	Peak chart positions	Certifications	Album
Title	Year	RSA	Certifications	Album
Undithatha Kancani	2019			The Voice Of Africa
"Empini"	2020	1	4× Platinum	The Voice Of Africa
"Esiphambanweni" (featuring Hlengiwe Mhlaba)	2020	1	2× Platinum	The Voice Of Africa
"Ngathwala Ngaye" (featuring Mondli Ngcobo)	2021		Platinum	The Voice Of Africa

== Filmography ==
- Zulu Wedding (2017)
- uSkroef No Sexy: In Kgantse And Kenny's Paradise
- Life with Kelly Khumalo (2021)
- Stand Up South Africa as Judge
- Idols South Africa as Guest Judge
- Rhythm City as Sunay

== Awards and nominations ==
Year	Award Ceremony	Nominated work	Result	Ref.
2013	SAMA	Best Female Artist	Won	
2013	SAMA	Album of the Year	Nominated	
2013	SAMA	Best African Adult Album	Nominated	
2013	SAMA	Best Maskandi Album	Nominated	
2015	14th Metro FM Awards	Song of the Year	Nominated	
2015	14th Metro FM Awards	Best Afro Pop album	Nominated	
2019	25th SAMA	Female Artist of the Year	Nominated	
2019	25th SAMA	Best Afro Pop Album	Nominated	
2020	1st KZNEA	Best Female Artist of the Year	Nominated	
2021	27th SAMA	Best Afro pop Album	Nominated	
2021	27th SAMA	Record of the Year	Nominated	
2021	Saafma	Best Song of the Year	Cancelled	
2021	Saafma	Best Female Artist	Cancelled	
2021	Saafma	Best Collaboration	Cancelled	
2021	All Africa Music Awards	Songwriter of the Year	Nominated	
2021	All Africa Music Awards	Best Female Artist in African Inspirational Music	Nominated	
2021	All Africa Music Awards	Best Female Artist in South Africa	Nominated	
2023	Basadi in Music Awards	Afro Pop Artist of the Year	Won	
2023	SAMA	Female Artist of the Year	Nominated	
2023	SAMA	Best Afro-pop Album	Nominated	
2024	Basadi in Music Awards	Sofnfree Afro Pop Artist of the Year	Nominated	
2024	Basadi in Music Awards	Best Styled Artist of the Year	Nominated	
2024	Basadi in Music Awards	Music Video of the Year	Nominated	
