= Moja Love =

South African satellite TV channel

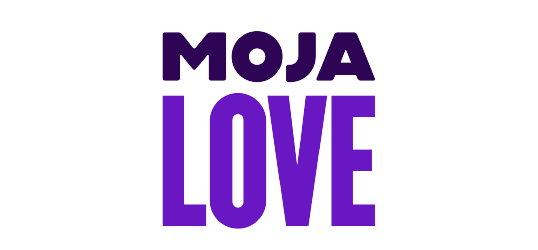
- Country: South Africa
- Broadcast area: Africa

Programming
- Language(s): Multilingual

Ownership
- Owner: Siyaya Media Network
- Sister channels: Moja 9.9.

History
- Launched: 14 February 2018

Availability

Streaming media
- YouTube: Moja Love TV
- DStv Now App: Channel 157

Moja Love is a South African digital satellite television general entertainment channel produced by Siyaya Media Network for DStv. It is a female-skewed channel geared towards content that showcases various forms of love.

== History ==
The launch of this channel comes just after Siyaya TV, a 100% black-owned company, received a pay-TV licence from the broadcasting regulator ICASA but failed to start its own pay-TV service, thus, they instead focused on creating channels for DStv. Initially, Siyaya TV previously secured exclusive broadcasting rights to the Premier Soccer League, which were later resold to the SABC.

It was announced on 8 June 2021 that it will roll out a new sister channel called Moja 9.9 from 16 June 2021 for DStv Access Subscribers, adding a new youth talk show, Start Somewhere

== Programming ==
Channel head Jacqui Setai explains that Moja Love "explores love from the unique perspective of the modern South African woman using honest, reflective, hopeful and humorous storytelling"

The channel is dedicated to celebrating different dimensions of love, and is filled with new-to-air exclusive locally produced content primarily targeted at women

- Show Me Love – Talk show hosted by Kgomotso"KG" Moeketsi, Unathi Nkayi, Abigail Visagie, Nontobeko Sibisi and Ntsiki Mazwai, tackling pressing issues that affect women every day.
- Hope – A telenovela starring Nimrod Nkosi and Charmaine Mtinta.
- Highly Inappropriate – Variety show hosted by Phat Joe
- Beat – A beauty-techniques show, hosted by Muzi Zuma.
- Sofa Silahlane – Hosted by Investigative journalist Mzilikazi wa Afrika.
- Uyajola 9/9 – Show that exposes infidelity, much like the American reality show Cheaters. Hosted by Jub-Jub
- Umoya – Reality show starring Thembi Nyathi, a medium who uses her gift to bring closure to the living and the dead.
- Zodwa Uncensored – Reality show which features internet sensation Zodwa Wabantu
- No Excuses, Pay Papgeld – A show where unsupporting parents are confronted to pay child support.
- Rea Tsotella - A confrontational show where the aggrieved party wishes to have an issue between them and the other party or parties resolved. Hosted by Moshe Ndiki and Bishop I. Makamu
- Kukithi La - A show where families that are conflicting over immovable property due to the deceased owner not having had a will. Hosted by Penny Lebeyane.
- S’khipha amaFiles - Reality show where communities or groups of interested people expose companies or people who abuse them or their rights.
- After Tears - A show that explores the culture of the ‘after tears’ concept, where the family and friends celebrate the life of their deceased love one immediately after the funeral.
- Traditional Wedding - Reality wedding show hosted by Kamohelo Bombe which showcases traditional weddings of the different cultures in South Africa as well as the process of preparation for the wedding.
- Vat n Sit - Reality show that is set against the backdrop of unmarried couples living together being not allowed in families. Family members of either partners write in to the show to have them either live apart or promise to marry one other.
- Mamazala - Reality show hosted by Dingaan Siyabonga Khumalo, it usually looks at an in-law and their bride or groom who are not on good terms as they try to resolve the root of their conflict.
- Lekunutu - Reality mobile studio show presented by Ntombi Mzolo, which provides a platform where willing individuals confess a long kept secret to unsuspecting friends or family..
- Uthando Noxolo - Hosted by Andile Gaelisiwe, this show looks at uniting broken and fighting families.
- Umshado Wethu - Reality show where married couples and their families look back at their wedding day.
- Umphakathi - A talk show that is a voice for black people. It looks at the issues they face and also looks at trying to find solution. Hosted by Aaron Moloisi and Ntombee Ngcobo-Mzolo
- Sphitiphithi - A variety show that looks at the youth culture in South Africa while also profiling events.
- Ziyawa La - A contest where entrants compete on the show to win money.
- TMI - An entertainment show that discusses entertainment news as well as hosts celebrity interviews.
- Ufelani - A show where families talk of their family members who passed as a result of intimate partner violence.
- Lovey Dovey - Hosted by Somizi. It shows different couples in the same mansion.
- Teenage Pregnancy - A show about pregnant teenagers.
- You Promised To Marry Me - A show about how your partner promised to marry you but didn't fulfil their promise.
- Vimba - A show about Exposing People or Business People who sell illegal products In South Africa
- Fake Marriage - A show about people who are being married illegal and unaware of are being married.
- Fake Gobela - A show Exposing fake Gobela who pretend to be Real Sangoma.
- Xrepo - A Show about People who want their Goods Back if it was sold they will choose to take other products from their houses or Business or to take Money hosted by Mr X

== Sister channels ==
Moja 9.9.
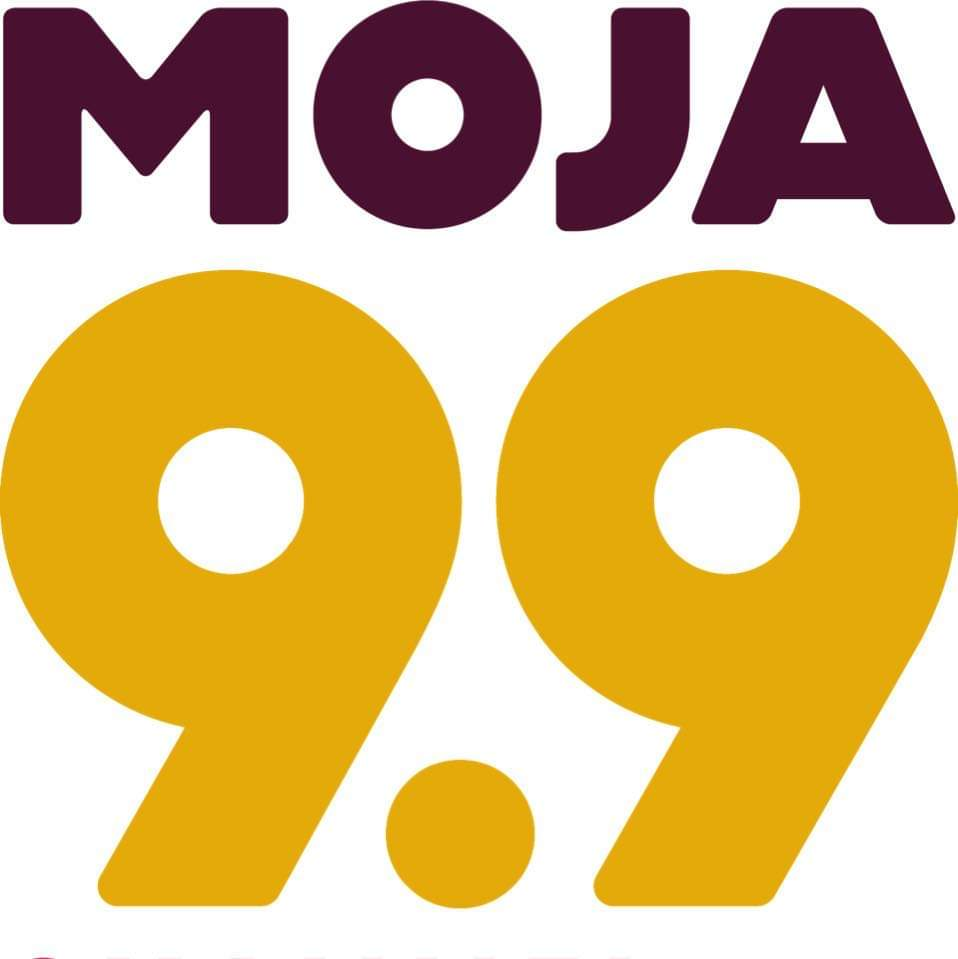
- Country: South Africa
- Broadcast area: Africa

Programming
- Language(s): Multilingual

Ownership
- Owner: Siyaya Media Network
- Sister channels: Moja Love

History
- Launched: 16 June 2021

Availability

Streaming media
- DStv Now App: Channel 158

After 3 years, MultiChoice expanded their partnership with Siyaya Media Network to include Moja 9.9. a repeats channel tailor made for DStv Access customers in South Africa and Family customers in the rest of Africa.
