= New Germany, KwaZulu-Natal =

New Germany
- Location within KwaZulu-Natal Location within South Africa
- Coordinates: 29°48′S 30°53′E
- Country: South Africa
- Province: KwaZulu-Natal
- Municipality: eThekwini
- Main Place: Pinetown

Area
  - Total: 9.13 km^{2} (3.53 sq mi)

Population (2001)
  - Total: 12,592
  - Density: 1,380/km^{2} (3,570/sq mi)

Racial makeup (2001)
  - African: 37.9%
  - Coloured: 2.5%
  - Indian/Asian: 5.4%
  - White: 54.2%

First languages (2001)
  - English: 56.8%
  - Zulu: 32.8%
  - Afrikaans: 5.2%
  - Xhosa: 2.5%
- Time zone: UTC+2 (SAST)
- Postal code (street): 3610
- PO box: 3620

New Germany is an industrial town situated just inland from Durban in KwaZulu-Natal, South Africa. It has been incorporated firstly into Pinetown and now into eThekwini. Originally Neu-Deutschland and subsequently translated, the name refers to settlement of the area by German immigrants in 1848. They came over to farm cotton, but when that crop proved unsuccessful, the settlers turned to growing vegetables and flowers. The town became a municipality in 1960.

Prior to 1 December 2023, vehicle registration plates in New Germany started with NU - N for Natal, U for Upper Highway; although New Germany does not geographically form part of the Upper Highway Area which extends between Kloof and Botha’s Hill.

== History ==
Natal's first German community owed its existence to the immigration scheme of an English Jew, Jonas Bergtheil, who arrived in Natal in 1843 and established the Natal Cotton Company three years later. Bergtheil saw the potential of European settlement along the coast and approached the British colonial office for immigrants. When first the British and then the Bavarian governments rejected his plans, he turned to the Kingdom of Hanover for support. Thirty-five peasant families (about 188 people) from the Osnabrück-Bremen district accepted his offer and arrived in Natal on 23 March 1848. They were settled in two adjacent areas roughly 10 km inland from Port Natal and called their new homes Neu-Deutschland (New Germany) and Westville.

Bergtheil's cotton scheme failed after the first two crops were ravaged by bollworm. Furthermore, the ginning machinery he had ordered from England never arrived. The settlers soon abandoned cotton in favour of market gardening, and when their five-year contracts with Bergtheil ended many did not renew them. The fledgling community may well have foundered within a generation since the immigrants did not maintain contact with Germany and had no vision of a distinctly German community. The arrival of a Berlin missionary ensured that the language and religion would continue for the time being.

Pastor Carl Wilhelm Posselt (1815–85) agreed to care for the congregation in New Germany, where he consecrated the first chapel of the Berlin Missionary Society in South Africa on 19 November 1848. He conducted mission work among the Zulu farm labourers and in the Valley of a Thousand Hills, and in 1854 established a second station, Christianenberg, for this purpose. He also taught Scripture in the little German school which the settlers had established. In 1852 the congregation was briefly moved to Emmaus because of famine on the coast and declining numbers of settlers. Bergtheil succeeded in stemming the flow of Germans into the interior, and in 1854 Posselt returned to New Germany where he continued as missionary and pastor until his death in 1885.

== Geography ==
The town consists of an industrial area bounded on two sides by Otto Volek Road and Shepstone Road, as well as a large hilly residential area whose main arterial roads are Sander Road and Glamis Avenue (eastern boundary), and Bohmer Road and Bosse Street (western boundary). Neighbouring suburbs are Padfield Park, Manors, Wyebank, and Clermont.
