= KwaMashu =

KwaMashu EsiNqawunqawini
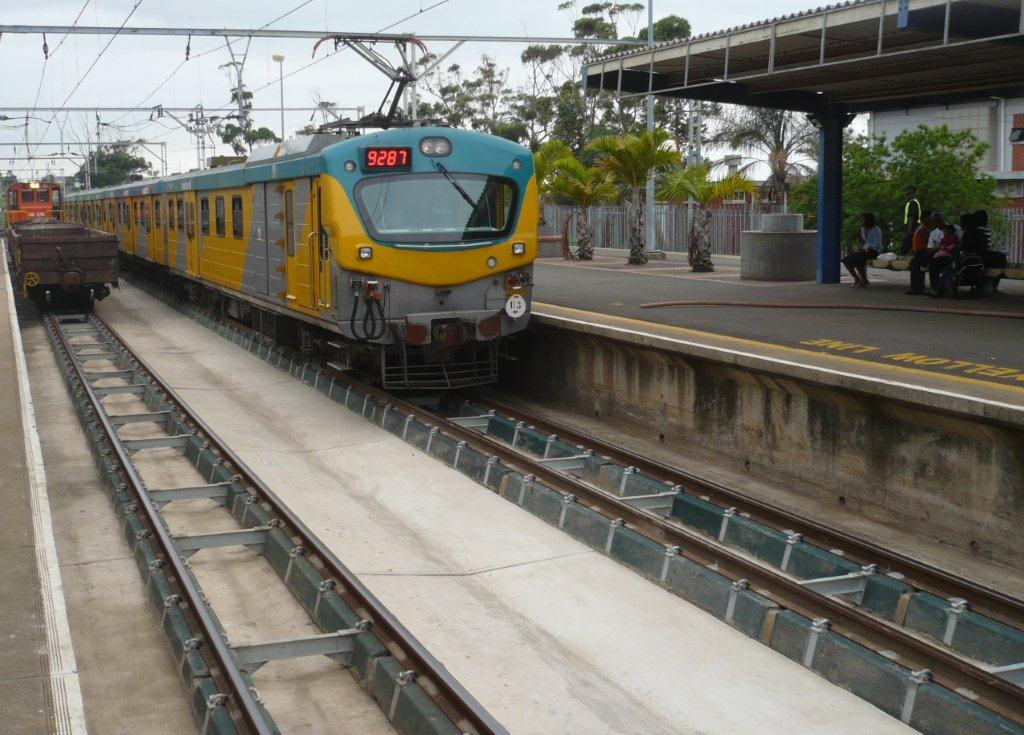
- Metrorail KwaZulu-Natal station in KwaMashu

- Location within KwaZulu-Natal Location within South Africa Location within Africa
- Coordinates: 29°45′S 30°59′E
- Country: South Africa
- Province: KwaZulu-Natal
- Municipality: eThekwini
- Main Place: Durban
- Established: 1959

Area
  - Total: 21.47 km^{2} (8.29 sq mi)

Population (2011)
  - Total: 175,663
  - Density: 8,182/km^{2} (21,190/sq mi)

Racial makeup (2011)
  - Black African: 98.8%
  - Coloured: 0.2%
  - Indian/Asian: 0.8%
  - White: 0.1%
  - Other: 0.1%

First languages (2011)
  - Zulu: 91.3%
  - English: 2.9%
  - Xhosa: 1.5%
  - S. Ndebele: 1.3%
  - Other: 3.0%
- Time zone: UTC+2 (SAST)
- Postal code (street): 4360
- Area code: 031

KwaMashu is a township 12 kilometres (7.5 mi) north of Durban, South Africa. The name honours Sir Marshall Campbell and means Place of Marshall. KwaMashu is bordered by Newlands East to the south, Newlands West to the west, Ntuzuma to the north, Phoenix to the north-east, Mount Edgecombe to the east and Durban North to the south-east.

== History ==
Construction of a new townships started in 1958 and the initial project lasted eleven years. The black population were removed from Cato Manor and transferred to the township.

== Arts ==
KwaMashu is notable for its lively performing arts scene, which includes Maskandi, hip hop, pansula dancing, dance, drama, and football. Through the performance, the young people of KwaMashu are raising the cultural profile of KwaMashu, aided significantly by the skills, resources and direction of eKhaya Multi Arts Centre for Arts and Performance. Uzalo, a South African telenovela, is shot and set in kwaMashu, and the drama series eHostela on Mzansi Magic.

The township also boasts a community radio station at the eKhaya Multi Arts Centre, Vibe 94.70 FM, which has been in operation for over 4 years.

== Civil Society ==
The Abahlali baseMjondolo movement is very prominent in the informal settlements and transit camps in the KwaMashu area. They claim membership in K-section, Siyanda A, B, and B5, and two Richmond Farm transit camps.

== Public schools ==
- Bhekilanga Lower Primary
- Buhle Higher Primary school
- Daluxolo Lower Primary
- EThekwini Junior Primary
- Dumani Lower primary School
- Gugulethu Lower Primary School
- John Dube High School
- Khethamahle Higher Primary School
- Khuphukani Lower Primary School
- Kwesethu High School
- Mukelani Higher Primary
- Mzuvele High School
- Ndabazezwe Lower Primary School
- Ngazane Lower Primary
- Nhlakanipho High School
- Nkulisabantu Lower Primary
- NqabakaZulu Comprehensive High School
- Phakama Higher Primary
- Phumelela Higher Primary
- Phuthumani Primary
- Shayamoya Lower Primary School
- Sibonelo High School
- Sivananda FET School
- Siyanda Mazulu primary school
- Thandimfundo Lower Primary School
- Thandukwazi Higher Primary School
- Tholamandla Higher Primary School
- Zakhe High School
- Dukemini Lower Primary School
- Vuyiswa Mtolo High School
- Vilakazi Junior Primary School
- Zeph Dlomo High School
- Zamokuhle Lower Primary School
- Ekusizaneni Higher Primary School

== Related Townships ==
- Inanda
- Ntuzuma
- uMlazi
- Chesterville
- Lamontville

== Notable People from KwaMashu ==
- Pius Langa, former Chief Justice of the Constitutional Court of South Africa.
- Henry Cele, actor
- Leleti Khumalo, actress
- Mandla Langa, poet, short-story writer, novelist, and cultural activist.
- Thenjiwe Maphumulo Moseley, comedian and actress
- Siyabonga Nomvethe, football player
- Jeff Radebe, politician
- Zakes Bantwini, musician, record producer
- Riky Rick, hip hop recording artist and record producer
- Nomzamo Mbatha, actress
- Deborah Fraser, gospel singer
- Siyanda Xulu, football player
- Zakwe, rapper
- Mzi Khumalo, businessman and mining entrepreneur
- Khulubuse Zuma, businessman
- Siboniso Gaxa, football player
- Nomonde Mbusi, actress
- Sthembiso Ngema, engineer, superhero, singer

== KwaMashu on film ==
- 2008 film "Kwa Mashu: Still my Home" by director Owen 'Alik Shahadah in conjunction with South African arts centre Ekhaya Multi Arts Centre under K-CAP with Edmund Mhlongo (Executive Producer), based in KwaMashu. The film is about the history of the township.
