= Mariannhill Toll Road =

Freeway near Durban, South Africa

Mariannhill Toll Road

Route information
- Length: 14 km (8.7 mi)
- Existed: 1986–present

Major junctions
- East end: M1 at Mariannhill, Pinetown
- West end: M13 at Assagay

Location
- Country: South Africa

Highway system
- Numbered routes of South Africa

The Mariannhill Toll Road is a toll road in the eThekwini Metropolitan Municipality in KwaZulu-Natal, South Africa, forming part of the N3 national route. Opened on March 7, 1986, it was the second modern toll road project undertaken in South Africa. The road is notable for its extensive earthworks and engineering achievements, including the Umhlatuzana Viaduct.

== History ==
In the 1960s, the National Transport Commission identified the need to improve the first 30 kilometres of the N3 from Durban to Pietermaritzburg to accommodate an estimated annual traffic growth of six percent. A key objective was bypassing Field's Hill, which was known for its steep grades, sharp curves, frequent traffic congestion, and poor safety record.

Initially, the Stockville Valley route incorporating a tunnel at Winston Park was selected. However, due to funding constraints and escalating tunneling costs, the project was postponed and reviewed in 1977. This led to the selection of an alternative alignment along the Umhlatuzana Valley.

== Construction ==
=== Overview ===
The 14-kilometer section from the Mariannhill Interchange to the Assagay Interchange was constructed under three major civil engineering contracts totaling R79.1 million:

- Mariannhill to Umhlatuzana Viaduct (R37.8 million)
- Umhlatuzana Viaduct (R9.3 million)
- Umhlatuzana Viaduct to Key Ridge (R32.0 million)

==== Technical features ====
- Total earthworks: 7.6 million cubic meters
- Maximum embankment height: 45 meters
- Maximum cutting depth: 60 meters
- Road design speed: 120 km/h
- Configuration: Six-lane dual carriageway

==== Umhlatuzana Viaduct ====
A key feature of the project is the Umhlatuzana Viaduct over Giba Gorge, which consists of twin structures 410 meters long with a maximum height of 60 meters above the valley. The viaduct was constructed using incremental launching techniques and includes:

- Seven spans of 47 meters and two end spans of 40.5 meters
- Single-cell hollow box structure design
- 3.5-meter depth and 16.05-meter overall width

=== Environmental considerations ===
Despite the extensive earthworks, special attention was given to minimizing environmental impact. The project earned the nickname "Garden Route of Natal" due to its harmonious integration with the surrounding landscape. Extensive landscaping and erosion protection measures were implemented, with approximately four percent of the total project cost dedicated to these aspects.

=== Archaeological Discovery ===
During the construction of the toll road, a significant archaeological site, the Umhlatuzana Rock Shelter, was discovered by Dr. Rodney Maud in 1982. The rock shelter, located near Hillcrest, contains archaeological deposits spanning approximately 70,000 years and provides evidence of continuous human occupation from the Middle Stone Age through the Later Stone Age. Initial archaeological excavations of the site were conducted in 1985, concurrent with the final stages of the toll road's construction.

=== Challenges ===
During construction, the project faced several significant challenges:

- Extreme drought conditions in 1983
- Impact of cyclones Domoina and Imboila in 1984
- Complex geological conditions
- Steep terrain requiring extensive earthworks

== Financing ==
The project was partially financed through toll collection, which contributed R36 million to the capital cost. The remainder was funded through the National Road Fund. Toll tariffs were set to maximize income while ensuring cost savings for users compared to the alternative Field's Hill route.

== Safety ==
Several major accidents have occurred along the N3 near the Mariannhill Toll Plaza. In May 2016, an oil tanker and a heavy goods truck collided about 100 meters before the arrester bed, obstructing the highway and resulting in severe injuries. In December 2021, an accident near the toll plaza resulted in the death of a three‐year‐old and critical injuries to another child. A collision in November 2022 involving six vehicles and two trucks resulted in four fatalities, and in April 2023, a multi-vehicle collision left five people injured. In December 2024, a Zimbabwean truck lost control and collided with multiple trucks and cars, resulting in one fatality and several injuries.

== See also ==
- N3 (South Africa)
- M13 (Durban)
- Transport in South Africa
