= Rick Crouch =

South African politician (born 1960)

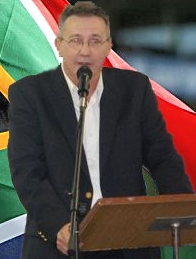

City Councilor eThekwini Metropolitan Municipality
- In office 2010–2018
- Leader: Helen Zille→Mmusi Maimane
- Preceded by: Gillian Noyce

Chairman eThekwini Ward 10 Branch
- In office 2009–2010
- Leader: Helen Zille
- Preceded by: None

Personal details
- Born: 6 September 1960 (age 65) Cape Town
- Party: Democratic Alliance
- Spouse: Michelle Mills
- Children: 2
- Occupation: Private Investigator
- Website: Rick Crouch & Associates

Richard "Rick" Crouch (born 6 September 1960) is a former South African politician and City Councillor in the eThekwini Metropolitan Municipality representing the official opposition Democratic Alliance. Aside from being a former politician Crouch is a private investigator and a qualified commercial pilot.

== History ==
There were three attempts on Crouch's life after which he decided to seek sanctuary in the United States.

== Career ==
=== As a politician in South Africa ===
In 1980, at the age of 19, Crouch became a member of the Progressive Party, one of the two opposition parties represented in parliament at the time. From the period 1982 until 1986, when he left South Africa for the United States.

Crouch, along with his family, decided in 2005 that he would return to South Africa to pick up where he left off in 1986 and run for public office. Upon his return to South Africa, Crouch was elected to the Chairmanship of the eThekwini Ward 10 Branch of the Democratic Alliance.

During his time as chairman, Crouch has been actively involved in the community and in Ward 10. Crouch also served on the Executive Committee of the Hillcrest Community Policing Forum (CPF).

On 22 May 2010, Crouch was elected as a City Councillor to the Durban City Council representing the residents of Ward 99 for the Democratic Alliance in the ANC-majority Council.

In May 2011, Crouch was re-elected to the Durban City Council with an 83.87% majority, this time as a Ward Councillor representing the residents of Ward 10, which includes the suburbs of Gillitts, Hillcrest, Winston Park and Kloof.

In December 2012, Crouch was elected Councillor of the Year for 2012 by his colleagues.

In the aftermath of one of the most horrific accidents in Durban, the 2013 Pinetown crash, Crouch has been vocal about the Provincial Government's failure in stopping the carnage on Fields Hill, going as far as accusing the KwaZulu-Natal MEC of Transport, Community Safety and Liaison, Willies Mchunu, of practising tombstone legislation. Crouch has been campaigning for stricter rules for trucks on Fields Hill.

In January 2017, Crouch was accused by some individuals of being a US spy. These accusations came about because he was flying a US flag outside his house to celebrate a US holiday because his family are US citizens.

On 4 February 2018, Crouch resigned his council seat to concentrate more on his expanding private investigation business and to spend more time with his family.

=== As an investigator in the United States ===
As well as becoming a commercial pilot while in the United States, Crouch formed a private investigation and digital forensics company. Through his work with celebrities and their high-profile attorneys, Crouch became known as "PI to the stars".

Some of the celebrities Crouch worked for through their attorneys are; musician Michael Jackson, actress Winona Ryder, musician Chris Brown, and the wife of Fred Astaire, Robyn, to name a few.

He also assisted local law enforcement and the FBI in locating and returning fugitives to justice. Crouch and his company also worked as bounty hunters, tracking down fugitives who had decided to "jump bail" and fled the jurisdiction.

Crouch authored and published a training manual and reference guide titled Bail Investigator Training Manual (Become a bounty hunter now) for investigators interested in or currently in the field of Bail Enforcement (Bounty Hunting).

=== As an investigator in South Africa ===
In South Africa Crouch has formed a private investigation and digital forensics company Rick Crouch & Associates where he holds the position of Managing Director.

Crouch has been described in local media as having a "Chuck Norris-like past".

== Publications ==
- Bail Investigator Training Manual (Become a bounty hunter now)

Party political offices
| Preceded by Vacant | Ward 10 Branch Chairperson Democratic Alliance; 2009–2010 | |
| Preceded by Warwick Chapman | West Durban Constituency Chairperson Democratic Alliance; 2011–2012 | Succeeded by Timothy Brauteseth MP |
Political offices
| Preceded by Gillian Noyce | City Councillor in eThekwini Municipality; 2010–2018 | Succeeded by Terence Collins |
