= Valley of a Thousand Hills =

Place in KwaZulu-Natal, South Africa

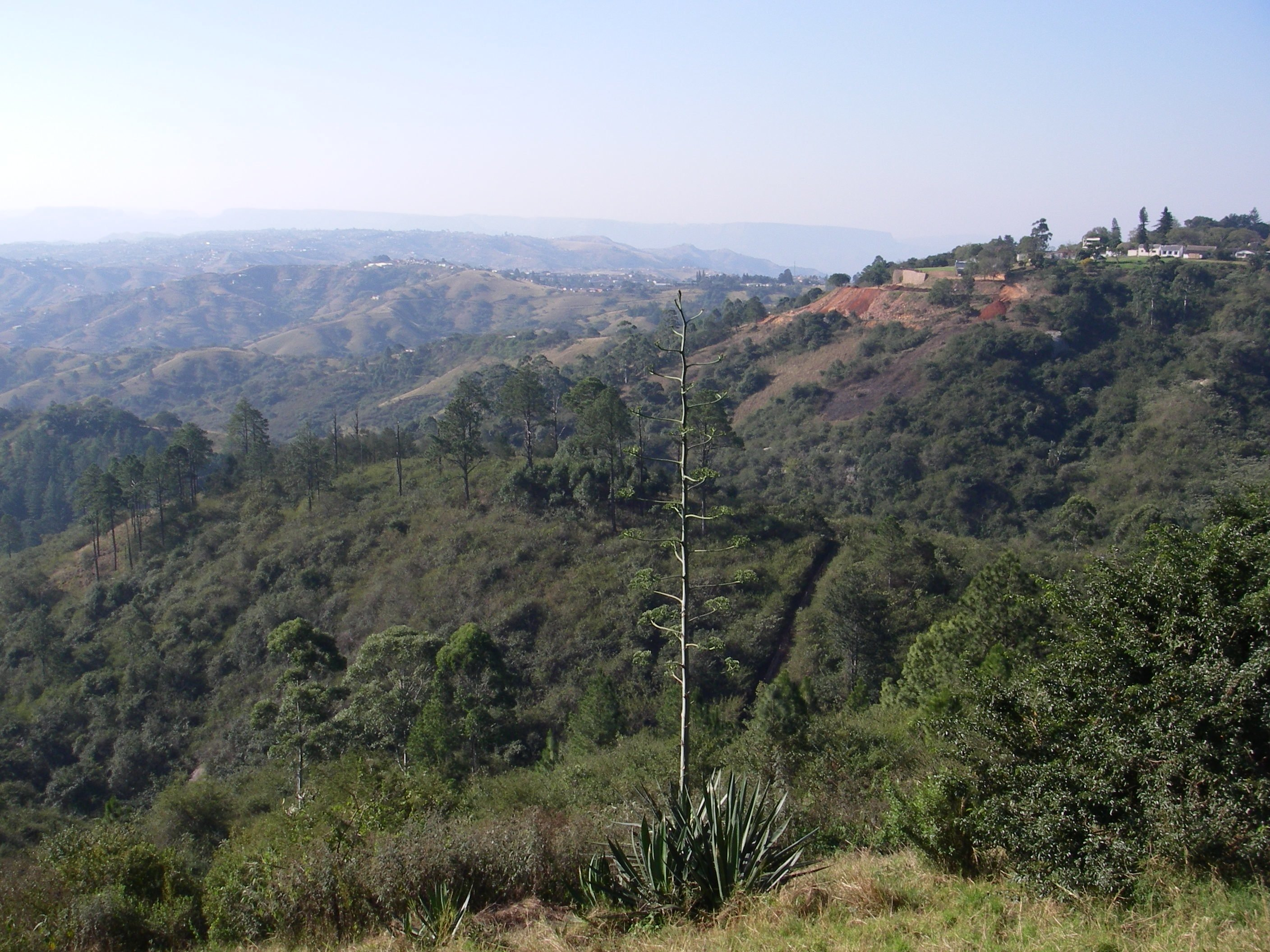
- Valley of a Thousand Hills
- Long-axis direction: West-East

Geography
- Country: South Africa
- Coordinates: 29.7749°S 30.7105°E
- Traversed by: R103

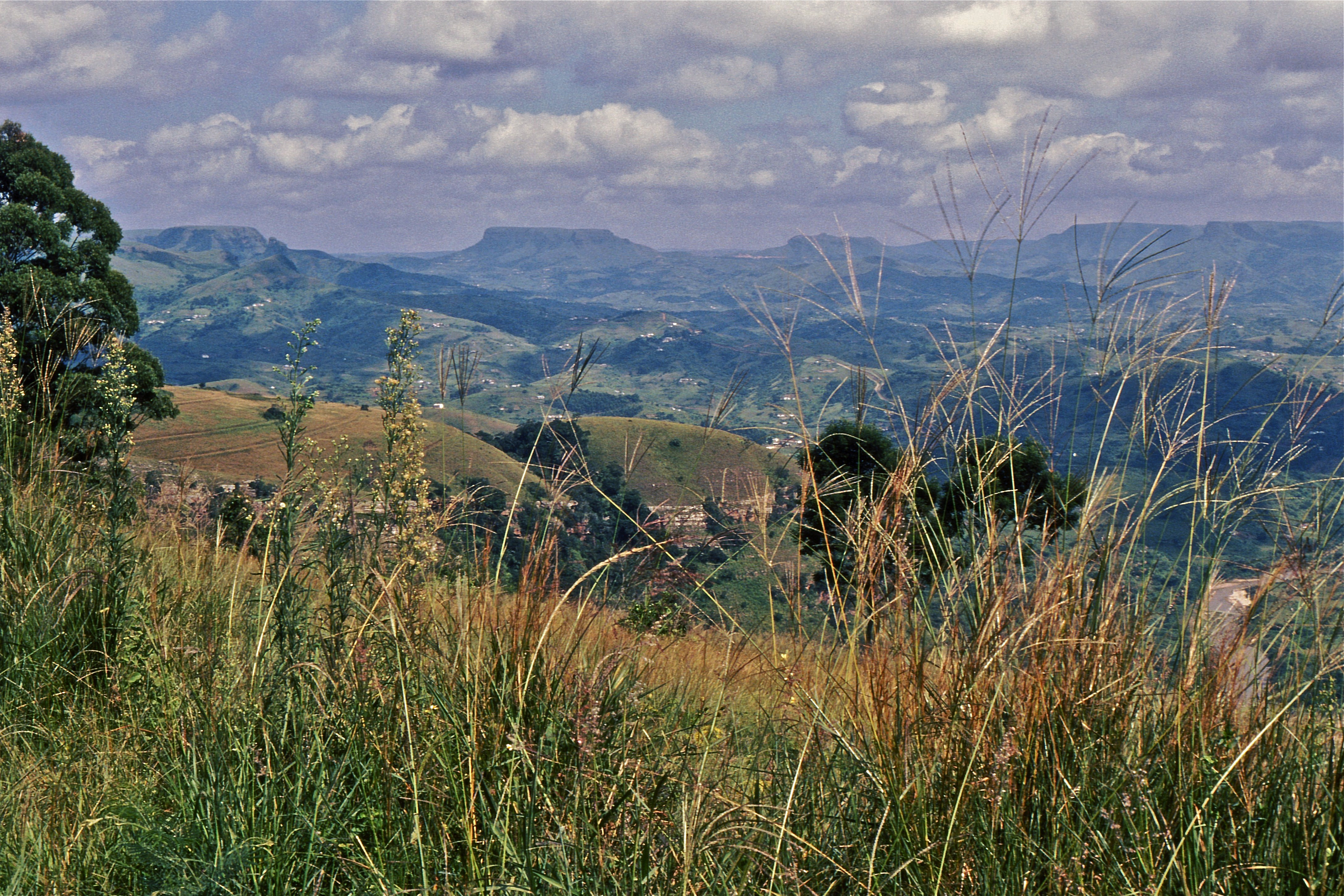
View from Ekukhanyeni into the Mdloti River valley

The Valley of a Thousand Hills is a valley between Pietermaritzburg and Durban, South Africa. The Umgeni River meets the Msunduzi River (Duzi River) in the valley, and the Dusi Canoe Marathon is run through the area every year.

== Geography ==
The Valley of a Thousand Hills stretches from Cato Ridge in the west to Kloof in the east and coincides with borders of the Outer West Region of the Ethekwini Metropolitan Municipality. The valley includes areas such as Cato Ridge, Inchanga, Mpumalanga (Hammarsdale), Drummond, Peacevale, Botha's Hill, Assagay, Hillcrest, Waterfall, Ngcolosi, Gillitts, Everton and Kloof. Wealthier areas can be found on the higher ground, while the lower section of the valley is dominated by widely spread, low-income households.

== Places of interest ==
- The Inchanga Railway Museum, which is located in the old Station Master's House on the route of the Umgeni Steam Railway, celebrates KwaZulu-Natal's rail heritage.
- The Shongweni Farmers and Craft Market is a popular weekly market open on Saturday mornings.
- PheZulu Safari Park offers a variety of activities, including visiting the reptile park, watching traditional Zulu dance, going on a safari drive, and visiting the Cultural Village.
- The Animal Farmyard offers great activities for children, including feeding and petting the animals, pony and horse rides and going on the zip line.
