= Field's Hill =

Road in eThekwini, South Africa

Route information
- Length: 3 km (1.9 mi)

Major junctions
- East end: Pinetown
- West end: Upper Highway Area

Location
- Country: South Africa

Highway system
- Numbered routes of South Africa

Field's Hill is a steep section of the M13 (King Cetshwayo Highway) located in the eThekwini Metropolitan Municipality in KwaZulu-Natal, South Africa. It forms part of the alternative route connecting Pinetown with the Upper Highway Area and is noted for its steep gradient, challenging driving conditions, and its inclusion on the Comrades Marathon course.

== Route description ==
Field's Hill constitutes an approximately 3‑km long ascent on the M13, which serves as a major commuter route between the Durban city centre and the western suburbs. The section is characterized by a persistent gradient (approximately 1:15) and a series of tight curves, factors that contribute to its reputation as a challenging stretch for both passenger vehicles and heavy goods vehicles.

== History and significance ==
Prior to the re-routing of the N3 through Mariannhill in the mid‑1980s, Field's Hill was part of the main arterial road used for travel between Durban and inland areas. Today, it remains a significant transport link for residents of Pinetown, Westville, Kloof, and Gillitts. In addition to its role in everyday traffic, Field's Hill is a notable feature of the annual Comrades Marathon, where its steep descent is regarded as one of the most challenging sections of the race.

== Accident record ==
The steep gradient and variable weather conditions have contributed to a history of serious traffic accidents on Field's Hill. One of the most significant incidents occurred in September 2013, when a truck lost control on the descent, resulting in multiple fatalities and injuries. Subsequent accidents have underscored the risks associated with this section of the highway. Heavy motor vehicle operators are accused of using Field's Hill to avoid paying the toll fee on the Mariannhill Toll Road, part of that national route N3 to and from Johannesburg. In response, the KwaZulu-Natal government placed restrictions on the times at which heavy vehicles are allowed to use the Field's Hill route.

== Etymology ==
Field's Hill was named after John Coote Field, an early settler in the area. The Field family played a significant role in the development of the region, with their farm, Richmond, established in 1851.

== See also ==
- M13 (Durban)
- Upper Highway Area
- Pinetown
- Comrades Marathon
