= Upper Highway Area =

Western sub-region of eThekwini, South Africa

- Region
- Location within KwaZulu-Natal Location within South Africa
- Coordinates: 29°47′50″S 30°47′40″E
- Country: South Africa
- Province: KwaZulu-Natal
- Municipality: eThekwini
- Time zone: UTC+2 (SAST)

The Upper Highway Area is a suburban region situated west of Durban in KwaZulu-Natal, South Africa. The region forms part of the eThekwini Metropolitan Municipality and encompasses a collection of interconnected suburban communities stretching from Kloof in the east to Botha's Hill in the west. Its name derives from both the M13 highway (King Cetshwayo Highway) that serves as its primary transportation artery and its elevated position above the Kloof escarpment.

== History ==
The Upper Highway Area was historically characterised by large agricultural estates and scattered settlements established during the colonial period. The region's development accelerated in the mid-20th century, particularly following the construction of the M13 highway.

The area's transformation from agricultural land to suburban development began in earnest during the 1960s and 1970s, with Kloof and Hillcrest emerging as primary residential centres.The establishment of several prestigious schools in the region, including Kearsney College (moved to Botha's Hill in 1939) and St Mary's Diocesan School for Girls (founded 1906), contributed to its reputation as a desirable residential area.

== Geography and Demographics ==
The Upper Highway Area occupies a strategic position within the Outer West Municipal Planning Region of the eThekwini Metropolitan Municipality.

=== Topography and Climate ===
The region is characterised by its elevated position, ranging from approximately 450 to 700 meters above sea level. This elevation results in a notably cooler climate compared to coastal Durban, with average temperatures typically 3-5°C lower than the coast.

The area features significant indigenous forest patches, particularly in Kloof and Everton, which form part of the broader KwaZulu-Natal coastal forest mosaic.

=== Communities ===
The region extends from the eastern suburb of Kloof (population 29,704), through Gillitts (population 8,661), to Hillcrest (population 13,329).

The northern boundary is marked by Waterfall (population 7,525), while the western periphery includes the semi-rural communities of Assagay (population 3,156) and Botha's Hill (population 2,673). The smaller community of Everton (population 870) lies between Gillitts and Hillcrest.

== Economy and Development ==
The Upper Highway Area has evolved into a significant commercial hub, with major retail developments including the Watercrest Mall in Waterfall, the Hillcrest Corner Shopping Centre in Hillcrest and the new Westown Square in Westown, Shongweni.

The region has experienced substantial residential growth since the 2000s, with numerous gated communities and estates being developed such as Cotswold Downs, Plantations, Camelot and Emberton amongst others.

=== Education ===
The area is home to several prominent educational institutions, including:

- Kearsney College, an independent boys' school.
- St Mary's Diocesan School for Girls.
- Thomas More College.
- Hillcrest High School

== Transportation Infrastructure ==
The region's transportation network is anchored by the M13 (King Cetshwayo Highway), which serves as the primary east-west corridor connecting Durban to Pietermaritzburg (via the N3). This major arterial route passes through Kloof and Gillitts before circumventing Hillcrest and Assagay along their southern boundaries.

=== Road Network ===
The area's road infrastructure is complemented by several significant routes:

The N3 (Western Freeway) skirts the region's southern edge, providing an additional link between Durban and Pietermaritzburg. The R103, historically known as Old Main Road, offers an alternative route connecting Hillcrest and Botha's Hill to Pietermaritzburg. Local connectivity is enhanced by the M33 (Inanda Road/Link Road), which connects Hillcrest to Kloof via Waterfall, and the M46 (Kassier Road), linking Hillcrest with Assagay and Shongweni.

=== Public Transportation ===
Public transport in the region primarily consists of minibus taxis and private bus services. The area is not currently served by passenger rail, though historical railway infrastructure exists along parts of the Old Main Road route.

Until December 2023, the area maintained a distinct vehicular identity through its "NU" registration plate prefix, representing Natal Upper Highway.
