= M13 (Durban) =

Metropolitan route in eThekwini, South Africa

Metropolitan route M13

Route information
- Maintained by eThekwini Metropolitan Municipality
- Length: 35 km (22 mi)

Major junctions
- East end: M4 / R102 in Durban CBD
- M10 in Mayville; N3 near Sherwood; M15 in Sherwood M32 in Westville; M31 near Paradise Valley; N3 near Paradise Valley; M5 in Pinetown; M7 / M19 in Pinetown; M1 / M31 in Pinetown; R103 near Hillcrest M46 near Assagay
- West end: N3 near Assagay

Location
- Country: South Africa
- Towns: Assagay, Hillcrest, Gillitts, Kloof, Pinetown, Westville, Durban

Highway system
- Numbered routes of South Africa
| ← M12 | → M15 |

The M13 is a metropolitan route in the Ethekwini Metropolitan Municipality in the KwaZulu-Natal province of South Africa. For most of its route, it is a highway named King Cetshwayo Highway (formerly Jan Smuts Highway) and it acts as an alternative route to the N3 highway for travel between the suburbs closer to the Durban CBD and the Outer West Suburbs (Assagay).

== Route ==
The route starts in the Durban Central Business District at an intersection with the M4 and the R102 (Julius Nyerere Avenue; Market Road). For the first few kilometres of its length, it runs parallel to the N3 on both sides as King Dinuzulu Road North and King Dinuzulu Road South (formerly Berea Road; one-way-streets). At the Tollgate Bridge, it then turns to the south and passes westwards through Mayville (where it is co-signed with the M10 for a few metres), before turning north and crossing under the N3 to pass through Sherwood.

At 45th Cutting, the route becomes a dual-carriageway freeway and remains as one for the rest of its length. The route passes over the N2 highway (Durban Outer Ring Road) westwards as a flyover and passes through Westville and Cowies Hill. The route then briefly touches the N3 at the Paradise Valley interchange (eastbound only) (motorists can drive from the N3 west onto the M13 west and from the M13 east onto the N3 east), before passing west-north-west through Pinetown.

After Pinetown, the route goes up Fields Hill, a 3 km 1:15 gradient. This section is notorious for heavy vehicle accidents that can close an entire carriageway of the road. The route then enters the Upper Highway Area, passing westwards through Kloof and Gillitts, before the R103 diverges, providing access to Hillcrest. The route then passes south of Hillcrest and through Assagay before merging with the N3 freeway (westbound only) at the Key Ridge Interchange, where it ends.

The route is roughly 35 km long.

== Significance ==
The M13 is the main thoroughfare to Durban for residents of the nearby towns of Westville, Pinetown, Kloof, Gillitts and Hillcrest.

The M13 between the Paradise Valley interchange and its termination at the N3 (Key Ridge interchange) used to be part of the N3 route until 1986, when the N3 was re-routed to pass south of Pinetown, Westmead and Winston Park. The M13 remains an alternative route to the N3, and is commonly used by motorists wishing to avoid the Mariannhill Toll Plaza, located on the N3 outside Westmead.

== Junctions ==
| Municipality | Location | km | mi | Exit | Destinations | Notes |
|---|---|---|---|---|---|---|
| eThekwini | Durban Central | 0 | 0 | — | M4, R102, Julius Nyerere Avenue, Market Road, Durban Central, Greyville | At-grade intersection |
| eThekwini | Berea | 0 | 0 | — | M8 Botanic Gardens Road, Berea, Musgrave | At-grade intersection |
| eThekwini | Berea | 0 | 0 | — | M10 Felix Dlamini Road north, Overport, Sydenham | At-grade intersection; Eastern end of concurrency with M10 |
| eThekwini | Mayville | 0 | 0 | — | M10 Vuzi Mzimela Road south, Mayville, Wiggins | At-grade intersection; Western end of concurrency with M10 |
| eThekwini | Mayville | 0 | 0 | — | N3, Durban, Pinetown | |
| eThekwini | Sherwood | 0 | 0 | — | M15 Locksley Drive, Overport, Sydenham | At-grade intersection |
| eThekwini | Sherwood | 0 | 0 | — | West Riding Row, Sherwood | |
| eThekwini | Westville | 0 | 0 | 7 | University Road, Essex Terrace | |
| eThekwini | Westville | 0 | 0 | 9 | Rockdale Avenue, Jan Hofmeyr Road | |
| eThekwini | Westville | 0 | 0 | 10 | Queens Avenue, Salisbury Avenue | |
| eThekwini | Westville | 0 | 0 | 11 | York Terrace, Attercliffe Road | Westbound exit only |
| eThekwini | Westville | 0 | 0 | 12 | M32 Rodger Sishi Road, Westville | |
| eThekwini | Cowies Hill | 0 | 0 | 13 | Josiah Gumede Road, Dudley Road, Cowies Hill | |
| eThekwini | Cowies Hill | 0 | 0 | 15 | N3 east, Durban | Eastbound exit, westbound entrance |
| eThekwini | Pinetown | 0 | 0 | 16 | Eden Road, M5 Stapleton Road, Pinetown, New Germany | Westbound exit, eastbound entrance |
| eThekwini | Pinetown | 0 | 0 | 17 | M7 Solomon Mahlangu Drive, Queensburgh, M19 St Johns Avenue, Underwood Road, Pinetown | |
| eThekwini | Pinetown | 0 | 0 | 19 | M1 Henry Pennington Road, Mariannhill, M31 Josiah Gumede Road, Pinetown | |
| eThekwini | Kloof | 0 | 0 | 22 | M39 Old Main Road, Pioneer Road | No westbound entrance |
| eThekwini | Kloof | 0 | 0 | 23 | Village Road, M33 Old Main Road, Kloof | |
| eThekwini | Kloof | 0 | 0 | 24 | Charles Way, Mkoko Road, Old Main Road | |
| eThekwini | Kloof | 0 | 0 | 26 | Everton Road, Lakeside Road, Gillitts | |
| eThekwini | Gillitts | 0 | 0 | 28 | R103 Old Main Road, Winston Park, Hillcrest (East) | |
| eThekwini | Gillitts | 0 | 0 | 31 | Shongweni Road, Hillcrest | |
| eThekwini | Assagay | 0 | 0 | 33 | M46 Kassier Road, Assagay, Hillcrest (West), Westown, Shongweni | |
| eThekwini | Assagay | 0 | 0 | (35) | N3 west, Pietermaritzburg | Westbound exit, eastbound entrance |
M13 ends
