= Winston Park, KwaZulu-Natal =

Winston Park
- Location within KwaZulu-Natal Location within South Africa
- Coordinates: 29°47′50″S 30°47′40″E
- Country: South Africa
- Province: KwaZulu-Natal
- Municipality: eThekwini
- Main Place: Gillitts

Government
  - Ward Councillor: Rick Crouch (Democratic Alliance)

Area
  - Total: 5.18 km^{2} (2.00 sq mi)

Population (2011)
  - Total: 2,772
  - Density: 535/km^{2} (1,390/sq mi)

Racial makeup (2011)
  - Black African: 13.3%
  - Coloured: 0.7%
  - Indian/Asian: 2.8%
  - White: 82.8%
  - Other: 0.4%

First languages (2011)
  - English: 81.7%
  - Zulu: 7.3%
  - Afrikaans: 7.0%
  - Xhosa: 1.3%
  - Other: 2.7%
- Time zone: UTC+2 (SAST)
- Postal code (street): 3610

Winston Park is a small residential area between Gillitts and Hillcrest in the Upper Highway Area of KwaZulu-Natal, South Africa.

Properties in the area are relatively expensive, and houses range in size from small condominium developments to several mansions.

There is a small school called Winston Park Primary School, situated at the renowned Jan Smuts Avenue entrance. Jan Smuts Avenue is the suburb's main street and is lined with approximately 2 km of very large and old Plane Trees. Winston Park hosts the Gillitts Sports Club, consisting of the separately managed Gillitts Squash Club and Gillitts Bowling Club on Vian Road. The field adjacent to the squash courts was once home to the Highway United soccer club but is now a designated community sports and recreational field for local residents.

Winston Park also forms part of the Comrades Marathon route, and every year, the residents flock to the four-way stop and Old Main Road to cheer on the runners. In the 2010 race, the 14:00 cut-off point was based near the Winston Park Caltex Garage.

== Sources ==
- The Highway Mail, 1 June 2011.
- The Hilltop, 2 June 2011.
- Independent Electoral Commission (South Africa), 9 June 2011.
