= Stuart Berry =

- Born: 10 June 1982 (age 44) Durban, South Africa

Rugby union career
Refereeing career
Years	Competition	Apps
2011–present	Super Rugby	12
2011–present	Currie Cup	
2013–present	International	4
- Correct as of 1 February 2015

Stuart Berry is a rugby union referee on the elite panel of the South African Rugby Union that has been included on the Super Rugby refereeing panel since 2011.

He was born in Durban and schooled at Hillcrest High School before he attained a Master of Science in hydrology at the University of KwaZulu-Natal. He owns a company in Durban that manages sporting events and music events.

== Career ==
Berry was first included on the SANZAR's Super Rugby refereeing panel in 2011 and was in charge of seven Super Rugby matches over the next three seasons.

In 2013, he made his international debut when he controlled the match between Japan and New Zealand in Tokyo as part of the 2013 end-of-year rugby union tests.
