= Thomas More College (South Africa) =

Coordinates: 29.788147°S 30.852817°E

- Kloof, eThekwini Metropolitan Municipality, KwaZulu-Natal; South Africa

Information
- Type: Independent
- Motto: Vincit Omnia Veritas
- Established: 1962
- Locale: Kloof, KZN
- High School Headmaster: Shaun Hardcastle
- Exam board: IEB
- Grades: 000–12
- Enrollment: 1163
- Colours: Maroon, Black & White
- Mascot: Moorcock (Formerly Duncan Meyer)
- Tuition: R45400 - R145000
- Website: www.thomasmore.co.za

Thomas More College is an independent, Christian co-educational day school located in Kloof, near Durban in KwaZulu-Natal, South Africa.

== History ==
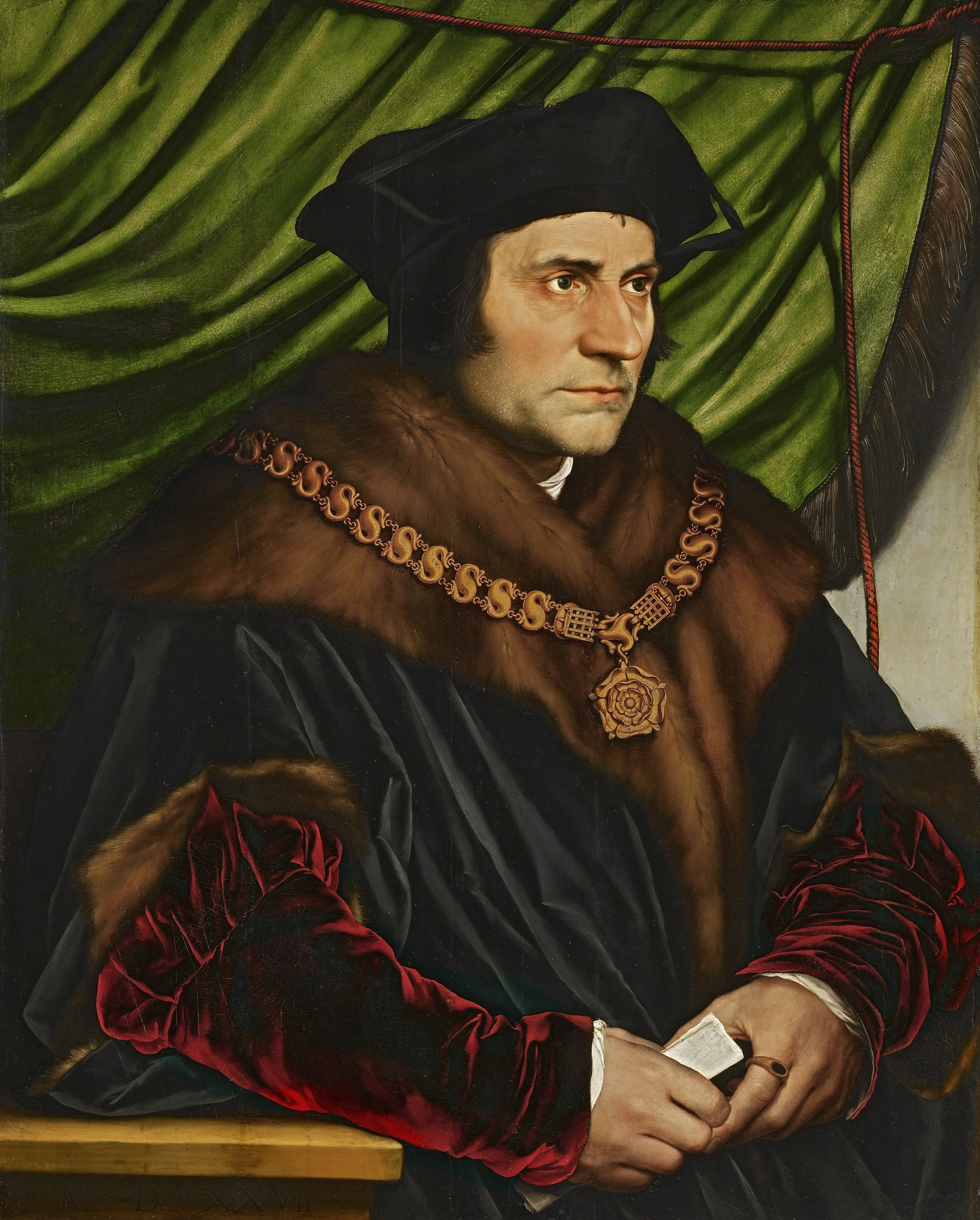
Saint Thomas More

Thomas More College opened on 1 February 1962 with 55 pupils, all boys. Co-education was not to come for another 14 years. The founders and headmasters were Robin Savory & Chris Hurley, who wanted to start a Catholic school run by Catholic laity. In this he had the support of Archbishop Denis Hurley. From the start the school had a strong religious element. The school was named after Saint Thomas More at the request of Chris Hurley, founder, headmaster and brother of Archbishop Denis Hurley.

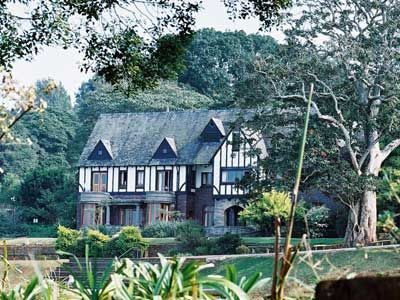
The Great House

The choice of Kloof as the site for the Thomas More School (as it was originally called) was due to the availability of the Great House, and the presence of a small core of likely pupils. However, at the time Kloof was a village with a scattering of shops and what was then a functioning railway station. What today are residential areas were then largely open grasslands, and Kloof High School was in fact Kloof Secondary, as in 1962 it only went as far as Standard 7 (Grade 9 in modern parlance). Between 1962 and 1992 (by which time the school's name had changed to the present Thomas More College) the school had three headmasters: Robin Savory, Chris Hurley and Bill Pickering.

Attendance numbers never rose above 197, comprising around 100-110 boarders, with the balance being 'day-boys'. This was despite the school going co-educational in 1976. By 1990 the school was facing closure. A campaign was launched to revive and expand it.

As part of this, a primary school was set up in the Farmhouse. In 1992 Peter Habberton was appointed as principal, and in 1993 the Junior Primary School opened. Much expansion in terms of buildings and other facilities took place. The boarding facility closed at the end of 2002 due to a significant drop in demand, and the rooms which became available as a result were converted to offices and specialist classrooms.

In 2002 Shane Cuthbertson followed Peter Habberton as principal. In 2009, due to re-structuring in the high school, Cuthbertson retained his position as principal of the whole school, and Allan Chandler, Senior Master at the time, was appointed as headmaster of the high school. A new hockey field, an all-purpose field and netball courts were created. At the end of 2006 a 25 m x 35 m swimming pool was completed. The Ken Mackenzie Centre appeared on the other side of the Savory Field. Pupil numbers have risen to 1,224, from Grade 0000 to Grade 12, making Thomas More College the largest independent school in KwaZulu-Natal. In 2012 Thomas More College celebrated a jubilee year for its 50th birthday.

== Today ==
The school is on a conservancy estate of 20 hectares and has 1,163 pupils. All pupils are put into houses (Hurley, Savory, or Dalberg) that compete against each other in events such as the interhouse galas and sports day as well as cultural events.

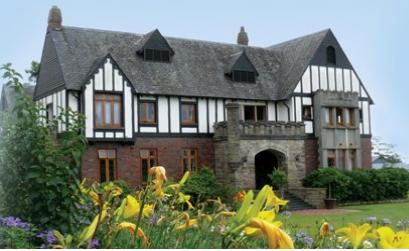
The Great House

=== The Long Walk ===
The Long Walk (originally called "the fifty mile walk") is a tradition of Thomas More College, started in 1963. The inspiration for the walk came from John F. Kennedy in 1962, when he challenged Americans to walk a 50-mile (80 km) event annually. In March every year, approximately 1 300 students, parents, past pupils, teachers and other visitors set off in the hope of completing the 80 km.

The earliest walks were from Pietermaritzburg to Greytown, away from Kloof. In the early 1960s there were no more than 30 participants on the Long Walk. Later walks still started in Pietermaritzburg, but students would then walk 80 km toward the coast, finishing at the school. It was easier than the walk to Greytown because there were fewer steep hills to walk up. In the 1970s, the walk started from, and finished in, the school grounds, with the bell adjacent to The Great House being rung when finishers arrived. In 1974, due to an error, the distance walked was 86 kilometers and only 21 people out of 350 starters finished the walk.

The current route starts from the school grounds in Kloof, and winds its way through the suburbs of Kloof and Hillcrest, before finishing back at the school Kloof.

From 2004, the finish was moved to Summerveld. In 2016 the route finish returned to TMC due to various safety concerns in the Summerveld area. In 2020 and 2021 the school cancelled the Long Walk due to COVID-19 restrictions on mass gatherings.

== Academics ==
TMC pupils write the Independent Examinations Board (IEB) exams.

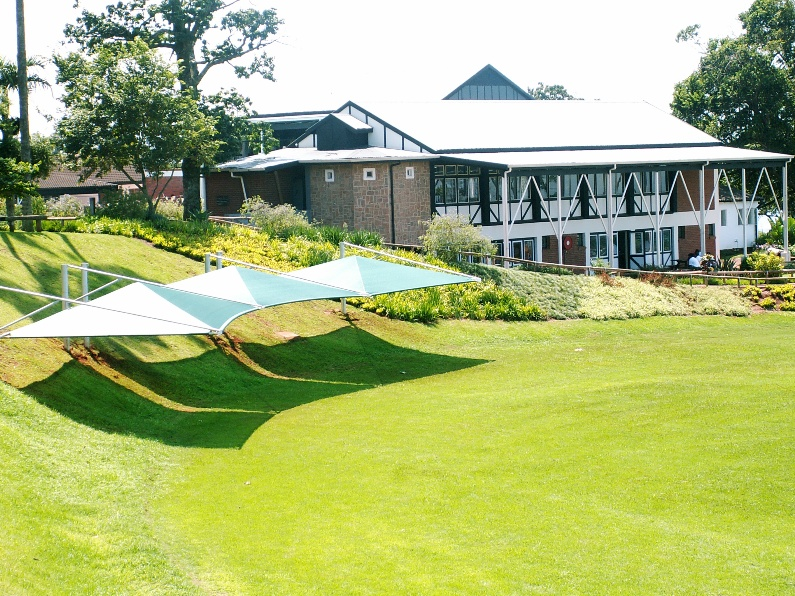
The Mackenzie Centre

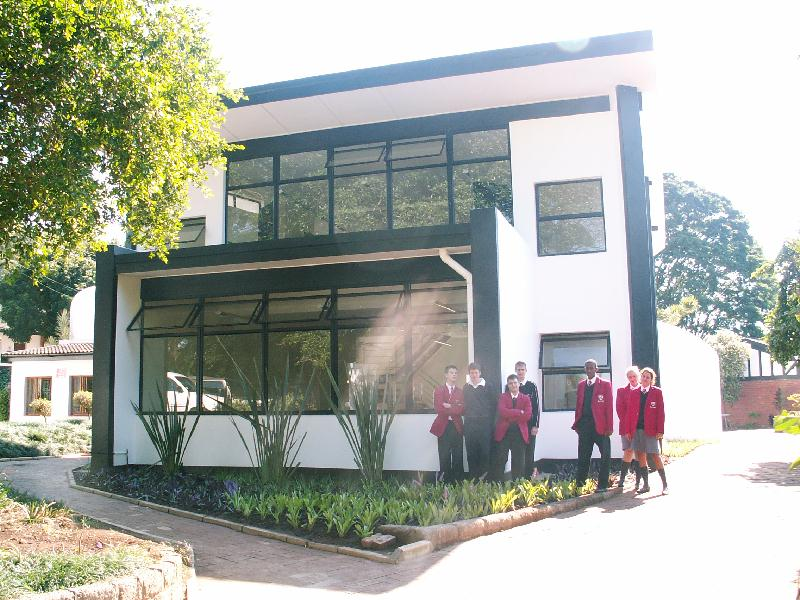
The Joan Savory Art Centre

Compulsory subjects include:

- English
- Afrikaans or isiZulu (as a first additional language)
- Life Orientation
- Mathematics Core or Mathematics Literacy

The students are also required to take at least three other subjects of their choice:

- Accounting
- AP Mathematics (Additional Subject)
- AP English (Additional Subject)
- AP Science (Additional Subject)
- Business Studies
- Design
- Dramatic Arts
- Engineering Graphics & Design (EGD)
- Geography
- History
- Information Technology (IT)
- Life Sciences (Biology)
- Marine Science (Additional Subject)
- Physical Science
- Visual Arts

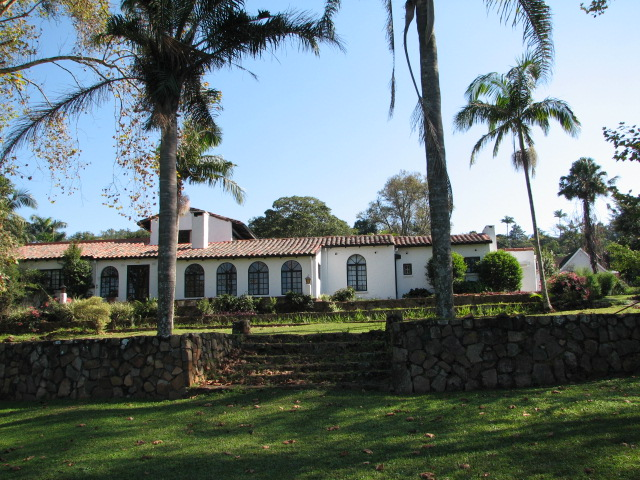
The School of Music
