= Kenville, Durban =

- Location within KwaZulu-Natal Location within South Africa
- Coordinates: 29.7816°S 31.0156°E
- Country: South Africa
- Province: KwaZulu-Natal
- Municipality: eThekwini

Area
  - Total: 2.38 km^{2} (0.92 sq mi)

Population (2011)
  - Total: 10,117
  - Density: 4,250/km^{2} (11,000/sq mi)

Racial makeup (2011)
  - Black African: 44.4%
  - Coloured: 7.0%
  - Indian/Asian: 47.4%
  - White: 0.6%
  - Other: 0.6%

First languages (2011)
  - English: 57.7%
  - Zulu: 28.4%
  - Xhosa: 6.1%
  - Other: 7.8%
- Time zone: UTC+2 (SAST)
- Postal code (street): 4051

Kenville is a residential area in northern Durban, KwaZulu-Natal, South Africa.
