= EThekwini =

eThekwini may refer to the following places in South Africa:

- eThekwini Metropolitan Municipality
- Durban, a city, the seat of the municipality
