= Giba (disambiguation) =

Giba (born 1976) is the nickname of volleyball player Gilberto Amaury de Godoy Filho.

Giba may also refer to:

== Places ==
Italy

- Giba, Sardinia, a comune in the Province of South Sardinia

Ethiopia

- Giba River, a river in the Tigray Region

South Africa

- Giba Gorge Nature Reserve, a environmental precinct in Outer West Durban, South Africa

== People ==
- Giba (footballer) (1962–2014), nickname of football player and manager Antônio Gilberto Maniaes
- Márta Giba (born 1943), Hungarian handball player

== Other uses ==
- Giba, a letter in the Gothic alphabet
