= Westown, Shongweni =

Mixed-use development in KwaZulu-Natal, South Africa

Westown
- Interactive map of the Westown area
- Alternative names: Westown, Shongweni

General information
- Location: Shongweni, KwaZulu-Natal (outside Hillcrest), South Africa
- Coordinates: 29.8105017°S 30.7463336°E
- Construction started: August 2022
- Inaugurated: March 2025
- Owner: Tongaat Hulett Developments
- Landlord: Fundamentum Property Group

Technical details
- Structural system: Mixed-use

Design and construction
- Main contractor: Stefanutti Stocks

Website
- https://westown.co.za/site/

Westown, branded as Westown, Shongweni, is a new mixed-use development situated in Shongweni, south-west of Hillcrest, KwaZulu-Natal, South Africa.

== Overview ==
Westown is the first development activity within the wider 2,000-hectare Shongweni Urban Development, a R30 billion catalytic project by the eThekwini Metropolitan Municipality. The first phase of the greater Westown Urban Core encompasses the R1.3 billion Westown Square shopping centre and The Barn lifestyle centre.

Other precincts within Westown will include, Shongweni Eco Park (a residential development by Balwin Properties), Farrier Business Park (warehousing & logistics), Parc Ferme (motor-focused commercial hub), Westown Mixed-Use, The West Private Hospital (100 medical & surgical-bed hospital and Westown Apartments.

Expected to attract R15 billion in investment over 10 to 15 years, Westown is envisioned as the “New City of the West” and a key economic hub for Durban’s Outer West. To date, eThekwini has invested over R594 million in bulk infrastructure, including the widening of Kassier Road.

== Location ==
Westown is located south of the N3 freeway (to Durban and Pietermaritzburg) and along Kassier Road (to Assagay and Hillcrest) and JB McIntosh Drive (to Shongweni Farmer’s Market and Mpumalanga). It is situated approximately 4 kilometres (2.5 mi) south-west of Hillcrest, 12 kilometres (7.5 mi) west of Pinetown and 30 kilometres (18.6 mi) north-west of Durban.

== Development model ==
Westown is being developed on former Tongaat Hulett sugarcane land under a 99-year leasehold model similar to that of Waterfall City in Midrand, Gauteng. Instead of selling the land, Tongaat Hulett Developments (THD) retains ownership and receives annuity income from residential, commercial, and mixed-use properties. On the other hand, Durban-based Fundamentum Property Group holds the development rights under a renewable 99-year lease and is responsible for the overall vision and framework of the Shongweni Urban Development, ensuring alignment with public sector policies and plans.

== Retail ==
=== Overview ===
Westown Square Shopping Centre, which serves Westown and Outer West Durban as a region opened its doors to the public on 27 March 2025. Designed by retail specialists MDS Architecture in a joint venture with Boogertman and Partners KZN, Westown Square has been designed as a high street environment incorporating indoor and outdoor elements, and allowing for it to be open, permeable and accessible which encourages connection and interaction that the shopping centre aims to achieve.

=== The Barn ===
A standout feature of Westown Square is The Barn, an iconic barn-shaped hub designed for the community. It will offer a permanent space for local traders, showcasing artisanal homeware, art, beauty, fashion, food, and beverages, alongside quality restaurants and unique concept eateries.

=== Other amenities ===
Westown Square features a Town Centre, Town Gardens, an amphitheatre, and dedicated children’s play areas, creating a dynamic and family-friendly destination.

== Access ==
Once the roadworks around Westown are completed, the precinct will be accessed via Inkosi Shozi Drive (the new loop road and bridge over Kassier Road) and Westown Boulevard.
