= Roseway Waldorf School =

Location
- D435, Alverstone; Alverstone Hill, Hillcrest, KwaZulu-Natal 3650; South Africa
- Coordinates: 29.77804°S 30.73413°E

Information
- School type: Creche – High School
- Motto: Creative Education for Life Long Learning
- Opened: 1985
- Status: Open
- Exam Board: KZN
- Grades: Baby- matric
- Gender: Coed
- Website: Roseway Waldorf

Roseway Waldorf School is a coeducational privately funded school in Alverstone, near Botha's Hill, KwaZulu-Natal, South Africa. It was founded in February 1985. The school now has programs from preschool through high school. The school is based on the principles of Waldorf education, laid down by the founder of Waldorf education, Rudolf Steiner.

The school is situated on a hilltop farm overlooking the Valley of a Thousand Hills and serves as the site of the Alverstone air monitoring station, one of 14 such sites in the Air Quality Monitoring Network in the South Durban Basin.

== Academics ==
Roseway Waldorf School follows the Waldorf Steiner Curriculum.

The Waldorf curriculum runs from preschool till the class 12 year (18 year old)

In their 13th year Roseway pupils write the National Senior Certificate Exam. This follows the D.O.E CAPS curriculum. All work at this level is moderated and signed off by department officials. Learners choose seven of the 16 matriculation subjects offered at Roseway, namely:

- English Home Language
- Afrikaans FAL
- IsiZulu FAL
- Mathematics or Mathematical literacy
- Litcy, Life Orientation
- Physical Sciences
- Life Sciences
- Geography
- History
- Economics
- Consumer Studies
- Tourism
- Religion Studies
- Visual Arts
- Music
- Dramatic Art
