= Roseway (disambiguation) =

Roseway is a ship.

Roseway may also refer to:

- Roseway, Nova Scotia
- Roseway, Portland, Oregon
- Roseway Waldorf School
- Roseway (horse)
