= Giba Gorge Nature Reserve =

Protected area in Outer West Durban, South Africa

- Location within KwaZulu-Natal
- Location: Near Hillcrest, South Africa
- Coordinates: 29.805065°S 30.777396°E
- Area: 72 ha (180 acres)
- Governing body: D'MOSS

Giba Gorge Nature Reserve is an environmental precinct in Outer West Durban, South Africa. The gorge is a natural valley carved by the Giba River, with steep rocky cliffs and natural grassland slopes. Within the precinct is a mountain bike park with a 35km single track.

The Giba Gorge Precinct is a public-private partnership between the eThekwini Municipality and private landowners, who pay a special levy towards the upkeep of the area. Of the land in the precinct, half is privately owned, with the balance belonging to the municipality and the South African National Roads Agency. Processes are underway to replace the co-management model through the declaration of the precinct as a nationally recognised nature reserve.
