= St. Mary's Diocesan School for Girls, Kloof =

Coordinates: 29°47′58″S 30°50′34″E

St. Mary’s DSG
- Kloof, KwaZulu-Natal; South Africa

Information
- Type: Private, Boarding
- Motto: Service Before Self; God Before All
- Established: 1906
- Locale: Suburban
- Principal: Jonathan Manley
- Exam board: IEB
- Grades: 0 - 12
- Enrollment: 1020 girls
- Colours: Blue & White
- Fees: R 152 480 p.a. (boarding); R 85 200 p.a. (tuition)
- Website: www.stmarysdsg.co.za

St Mary's Diocesan School for Girls is a private boarding and day school for girls situated on St Marys Road in the suburb of Kloof (eThekwini Metropolitan Municipality), near Durban, in KwaZulu-Natal, South Africa. It runs a primary school and high school on the same property, however the two mostly keep to separate sections, and take turns using certain facilities like the school hall.

The school was founded in 1906 on Field's Hill in the small town of Kloof and was called St Elizabeth's Diocesan School for Girls. It relocated to its present site in 1909 and was renamed St Mary's Diocesan School for Girls in 1919 at the stipulation of a benefactor. The school has an Anglican foundation, and students attend chapel a few mornings a week.

The school ground covers 12 hectares (30 acres).

Day scholars are accommodated throughout the school, with boarding available in high school. Students wear blue-and-white uniforms, with one uniform for winter and a different one for summer.

== Notable alumnae ==
- Tegan Fourie, field hockey player
- Lindiwe Mazibuko, academic, former politician and musician
- Kelly Parkhurst, actress

== See also ==
- List of boarding schools
