= Iphithi Nature Reserve =

Nature reserve in KwaZulu-Natal, South Africa

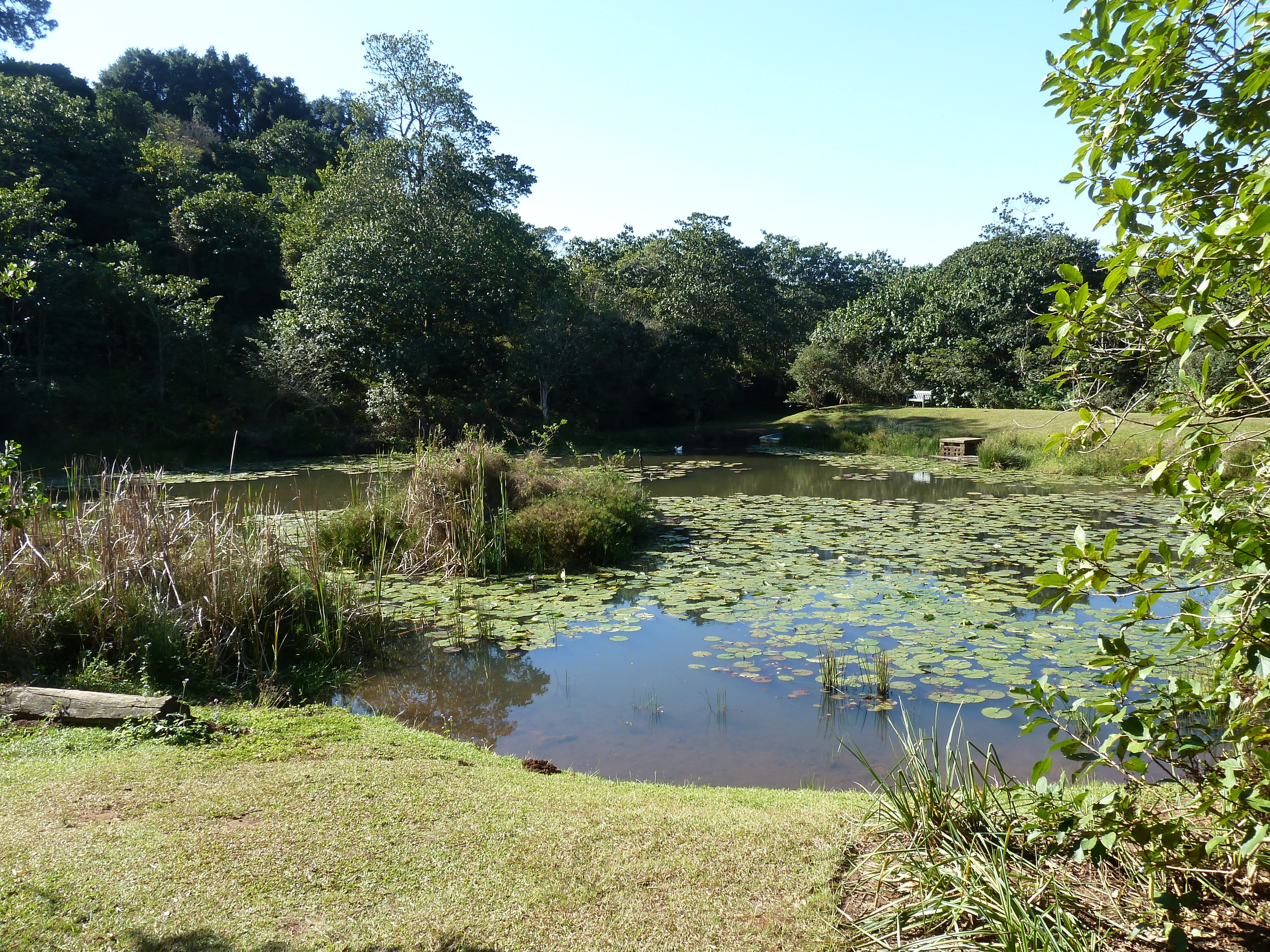
- Small dam in the mPhiti stream

- Location within KwaZulu-Natal
- Location: KwaZulu-Natal, South Africa
- Nearest city: Pinetown
- Coordinates: 29°47′24″S 30°48′02″E
- Established: 2001

The Iphithi Nature Reserve conserves 12 ha of forest and wetland in the Molweni River's upper catchment in northern Gillitts, KwaZulu-Natal, South Africa. It was founded in 2001 by a group of nearby residents, and is managed by the Gillitts Conservancy, which also oversees the Minerva grassland.

== Setting and origins ==
It is situated in the mPhiti valley, which is flanked by Ashley and Edward drives. A stand of invasive eucalypts was present here for 50 years up to 2001. Residents bordering the valley organised a committee and contracted a logger to fell these. The committee was paid a lump sum for the valuable timber which it used to establish the reserve, fence off additional entrances and pay for the laying of paths, building of viewing decks and planting of indigenous flora. Some residents bordering on the reserve have pulled their fences back increasing the overall size of the reserve.

== Fauna and flora ==
Its indigenous forest, wetland and grassland are home to many species of birds and small mammals, and the small dam which was built is populated with fish. Bushbuck, blue duiker, porcupine, dassies and mongooses are resident and some 47 species of bird have been recorded. The plant life is diverse but many exotic species are present.

== Facilities ==
The walks and park benches are popular with the residents, especially on weekends. The pathways meander around the reserve, and includes a boardwalk over the wetland. Lawn areas around the dam are suitable for picnics, and a small gazebo and deck near the entrance are available for a braai.

== Access ==
Since May 2013 the entrance gate in Edward drive is however closed at all times due to crime issues and inconsiderate revellers, and access is arranged by means of a computer and cell phone system. Phone numbers displayed at the entrance gate can be used upon arrival in order to gain access and again to leave the premises. An Iphithi sundowner stroll is arranged from time to time. Monthly donors have automatic access.

== Gallery ==
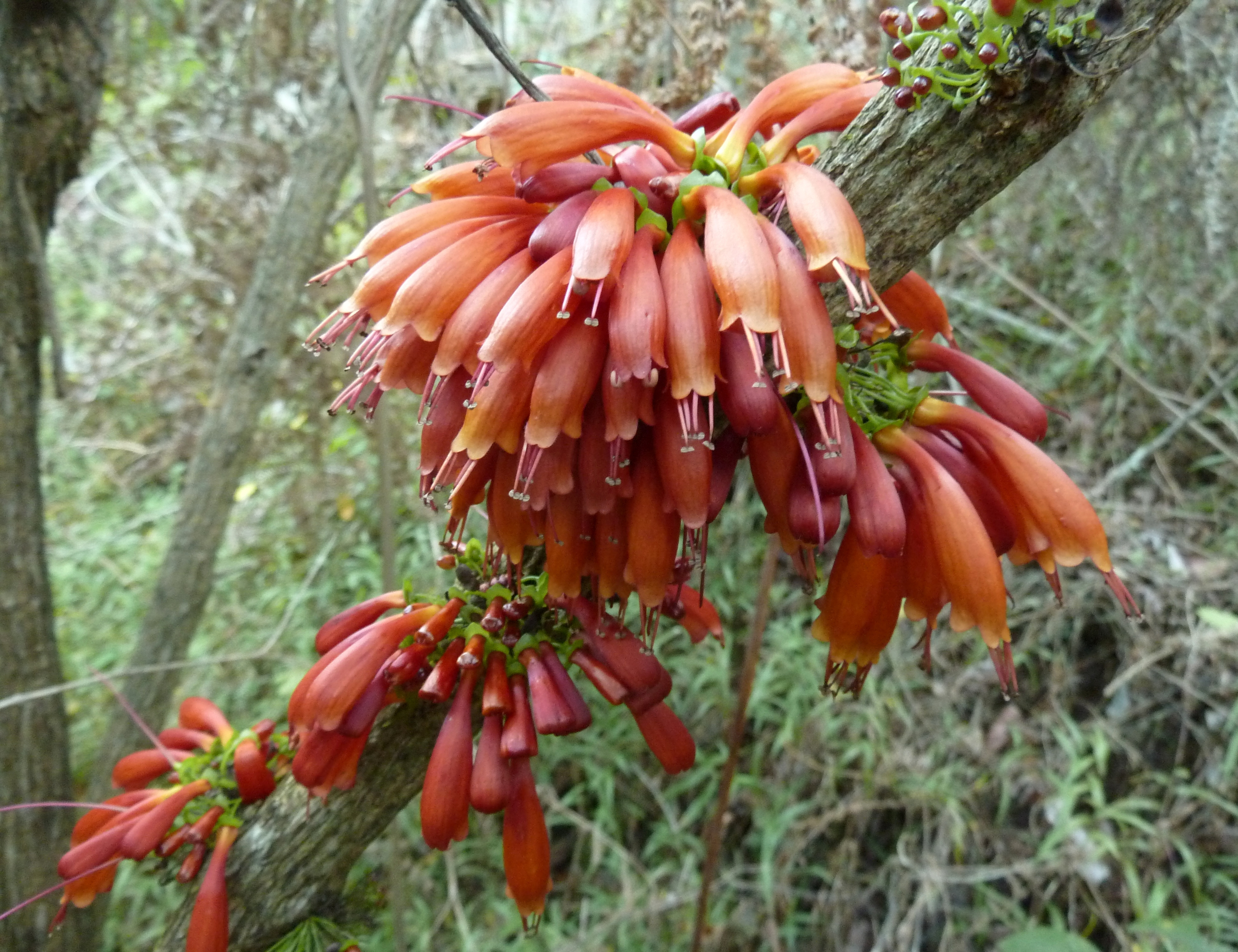
Flowering Halleria lucida tree

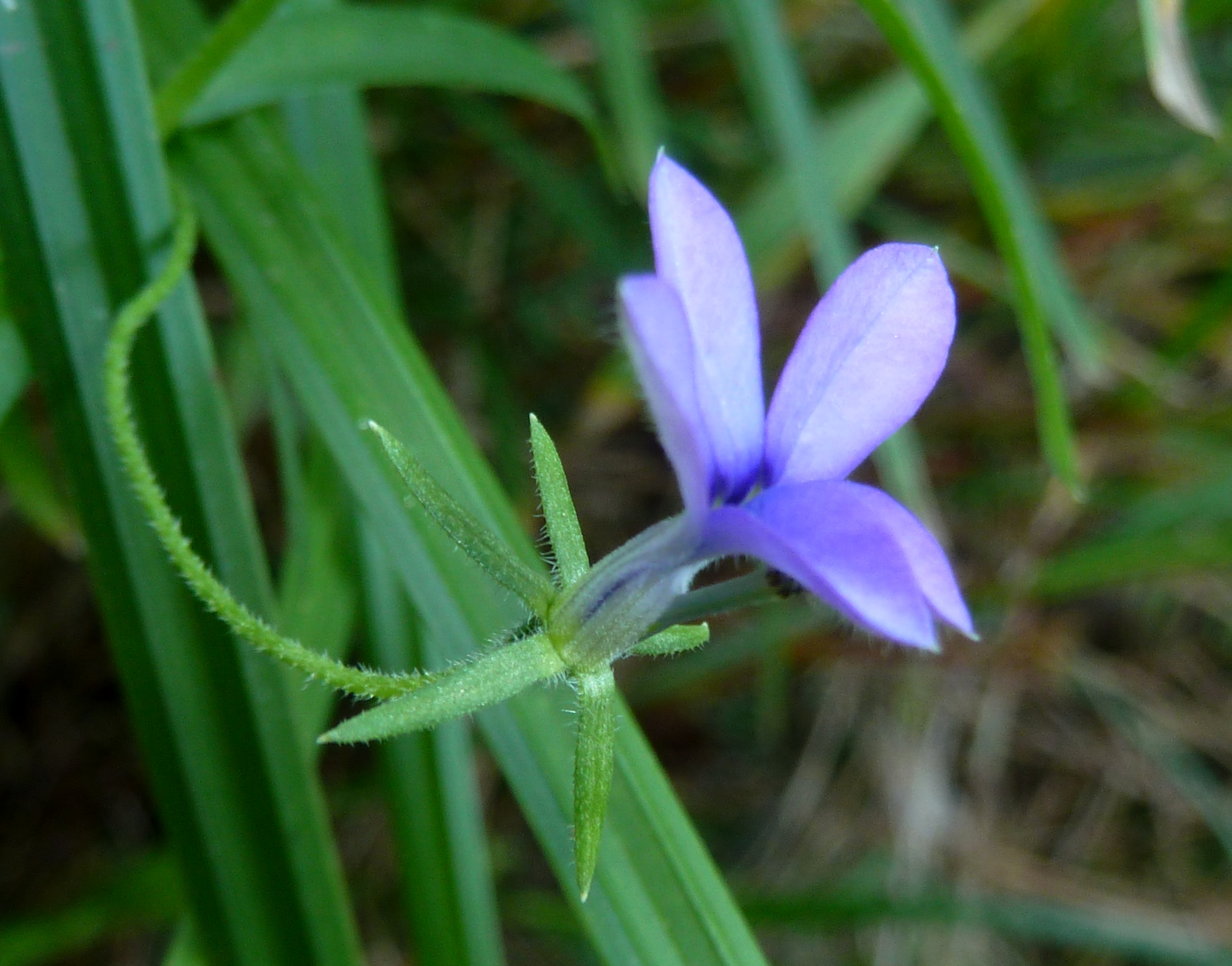
Flower of Monopsis stellarioides

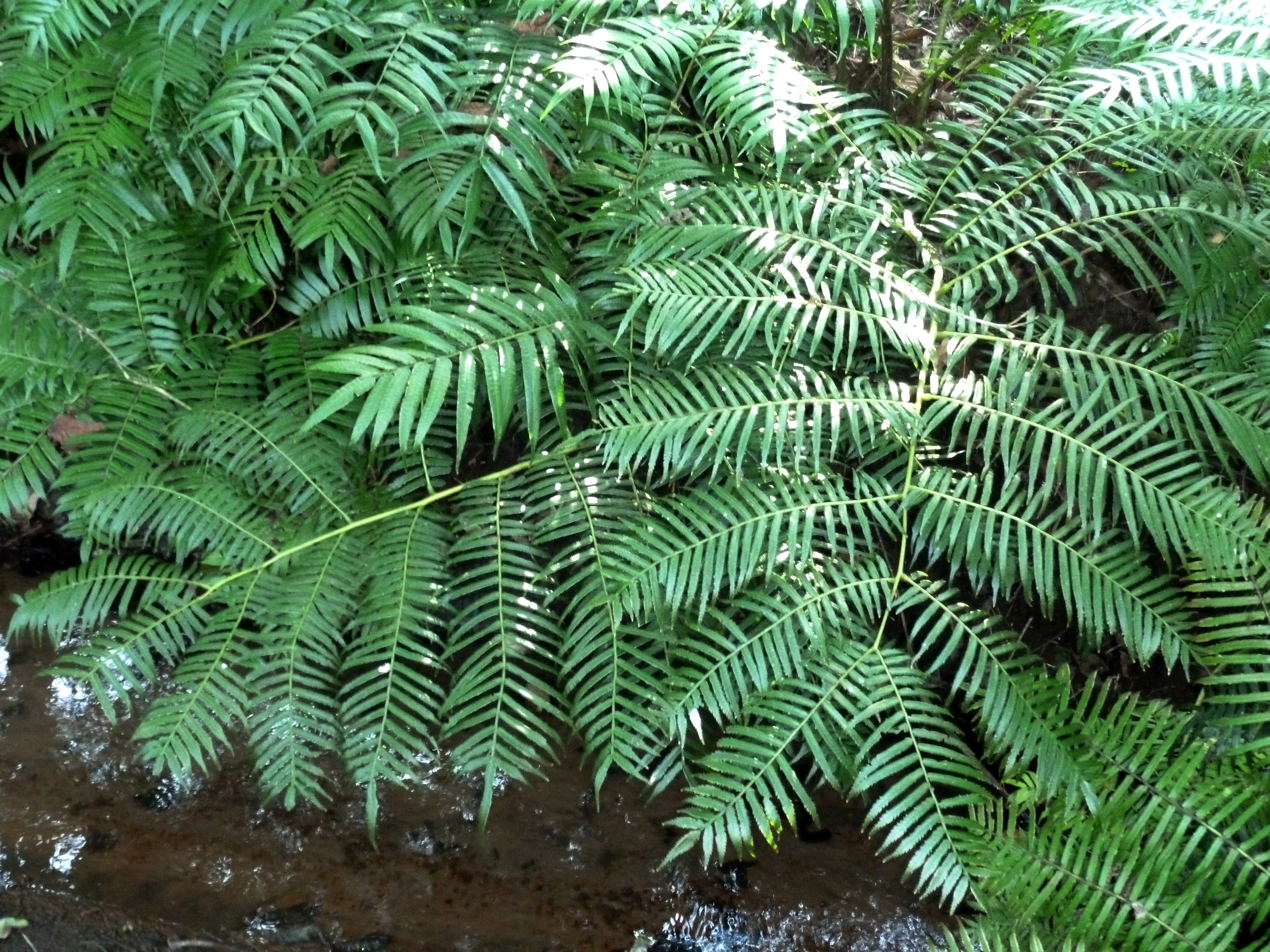
Fronds of Ptisana fraxinea overhanging the stream

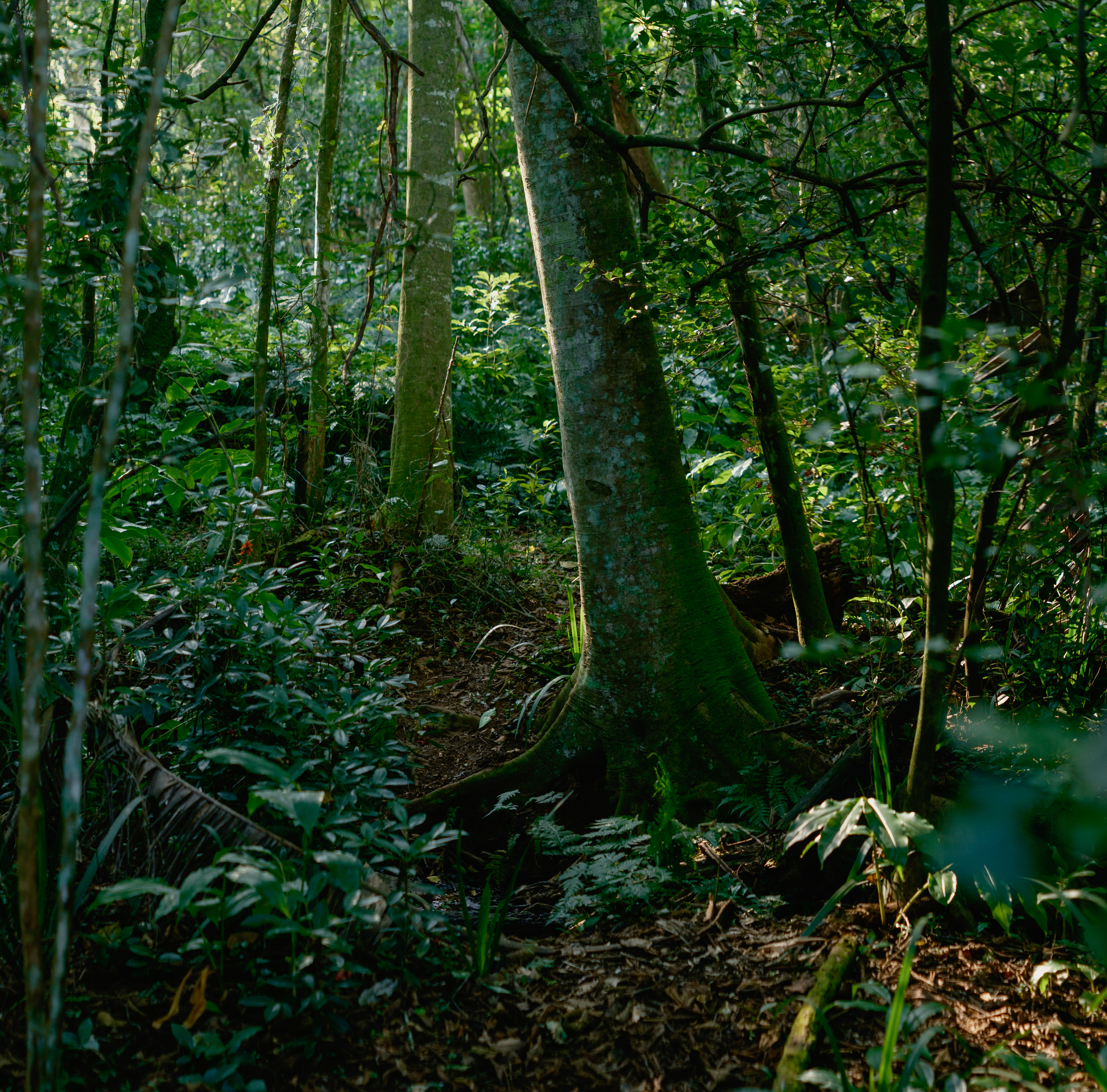
A forest patch
