= Kloof =

- Town
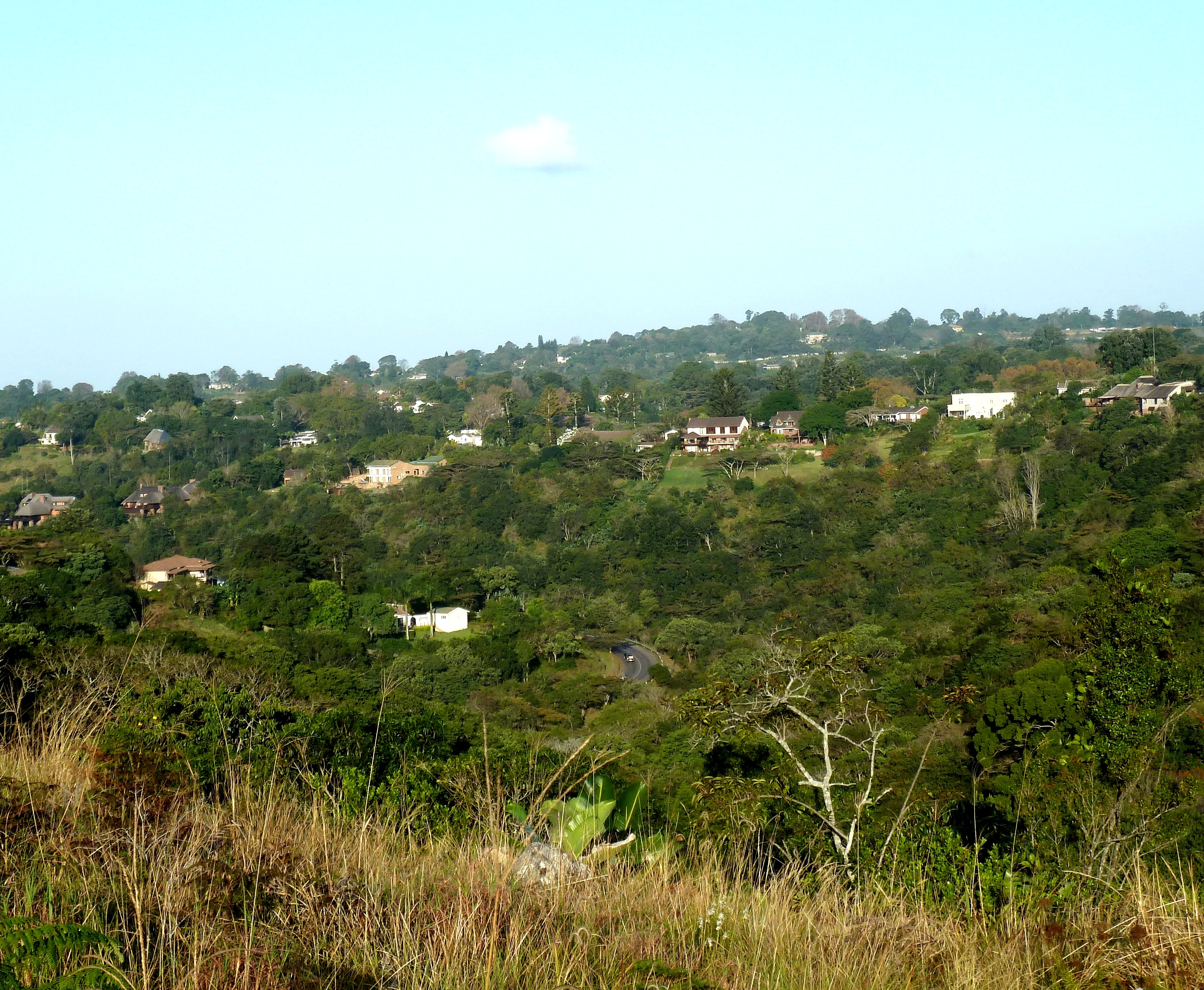
- Kloof suburbs from Krantzkloof heights

- Coat of arms

- Location within KwaZulu-Natal Location within South Africa
- Coordinates: 29°47′S 30°50′E
- Country: South Africa
- Province: KwaZulu-Natal
- Municipality: eThekwini
- Established: 1903

Government
  - Type: Ward 10
  - Councillor: Caelee Laing (DA)

Area
  - Total: 34.51 km^{2} (13.32 sq mi)

Population (2011)
  - Total: 29,704
  - Density: 860.7/km^{2} (2,229/sq mi)

Racial makeup (2011)
  - Black African: 53.8%
  - Coloured: 0.7%
  - Indian/Asian: 11.2%
  - White: 33.8%
  - Other: 0.4%

First languages (2011)
  - English: 45.1%
  - Zulu: 43.9%
  - Xhosa: 3.6%
  - Afrikaans: 3.4%
  - Other: 4.1%
- Time zone: UTC+2 (SAST)
- Postal code (street): 3610
- PO box: 3640
- Area code: 031

Kloof /kluːf/ is a town that includes a smaller area called Everton, located approximately 26 km north-west of Durban in KwaZulu-Natal, South Africa. Once an independent municipality, it now forms part of the greater Durban area, itself a part of the eThekwini Metropolitan Municipality.

The word Kloof (cf. cleft) means 'gorge' in Afrikaans and the area is named after the deep ravine formed by the Molweni stream (stream of high cliffs). The Kloof Gorge is part of the 4.47-square-kilometre (1.73 sq mi) Krantzkloof Nature Reserve.

It is a predominantly English-speaking area. Kloof features several upmarket shopping centres and the Kloof Country Club, founded in 1927. It is known as a mist-belt with winding roads and tree-surrounded mansions and has become an attractive destination for people aiming to get away from the city life of Durban.

== History ==
Details of the history of Kloof has been written by Rowe 2003

=== Richmond Farm ===
This part of KwaZulu-Natal was originally a 6,000 acres (2,400 ha) farm 'Richmond', whose survey was ordained by the first Lieutenant-Governor of Colony Sir Martin West, following his 1845 appointment to the post; he also named it, after Charles Lennox, 4th Duke of Richmond (Yorkshire, England).

The land Kloof occupies formed the 2,836 hectares (7,010 acres) Richmond Farm No. 999: this was purchased by William Swan FIELD, the first Collector of Customs (position he held until 1852) for Natal Colony, in 1845 for an amount of £245. He was also one of the first Magistrates of Durban. In 1845 his brother John Coote FIELD and his family settled on the farm, having arrived from the Cape Colony on the Pilot. The farm was eventually transferred into J C Field's name by Deed of Transfer in 1867, at a declared value of £1,401 pounds & 10 shillings.

The original farmhouse, called Richmond House, was built by J C Field in 1854 to replace an earlier wattle & daub house. The 'Richmond' section of the farm passed to his son John Coote FIELD the Second in 1880 on the occasion of his marriage, who partially demolished the original Richmond House and rebuilt another homestead nearby. J C Field the First died in 1896, and upon the death of his widow in 1901 the Farm was divided amongst the surviving heirs: 560 acres (230 ha) for each son, 395 acres (160 ha) for each daughter, and the homestead plus 500 acres (200 ha) to his youngest son Benjamin Cromwell Colenso FIELD. Current surviving relatives of J C Field still reside in the highway area: John Padley Field (adopted) and his daughter Kathleen Merle Field.

=== Kloof village ===
The further subdivisions and sale of portions of Richmond Farm No. 999 by the Field heirs after 1901 resulted in the birth of Kloof as a residential area: numerous plots were sold to wealthy Durban residents and businessmen, who built country house retreats close to the city, but (due to its 550 m above sea level elevation) removed from the Durban humidity and heat. These were particularly favoured by their wives and children during the long hot summer holidays.

From the 1890s onwards the appearance of the area therefore changed significantly, from its previous 'sandstone sourveld' grassland to its current heavily wooded flora.

Kloof was originally called 'Krantzkloof' by J C Field the First, after the nearby Kloof Gorge, but this name was later changed to 'Kloof' at the special request of the General Manager of the Railways, since due to a name similarity with Kranskop there had been significant confusion and misdeliveries of railway goods: the Railway Station was therefore renamed, and the town with it. The current Station building is a replacement of an earlier one, built in 1896, and it remained operational until the closure of this branch of the Durban-Pietermaritzburg railway line to passenger traffic in the 1970s. The building is now being utilised as a popular bar restaurant; it is also the main terminus of the Umgeni Steam Railway.

As roads improved, an increasing number of people began permanently living in Kloof and during the 1960s and 1970s, the development of the traditional Kloof houses occurred. These consisted of large houses that were built on stands of at least 1 acre (0.40 ha). Many of the houses have slate roofs, a swimming pool, small guest houses and tennis courts and they are often tucked away amidst the trees.

== Geography ==
Kloof is situated in the Upper Highway Area of Durban, approximately 26 kilometres (16 mi) north-west of the city and is bordered by Gillitts and Everton to the west, Waterfall to the north-west, Wyebank to the north-east, Molweni to the north and Pinetown to the east. It lies at an altitude of approximately 550 m (1804 ft) above sea level, on the Kloof Plateau, just above Pinetown, extending from the top of Field's Hill.

== Transport ==
The M13 highway (built in the 1940s) intersects Kloof connecting the town to Pinetown, Westville and Durban to the east and Gillitts, Hillcrest and Pietermaritzburg (via the N3) to the west. As from 16 June this forms part of the route of the annual Comrades Marathon, an approximately 90-kilometre (56 mi) ultra-marathon run between Pietermaritzburg and Durban since 1924.

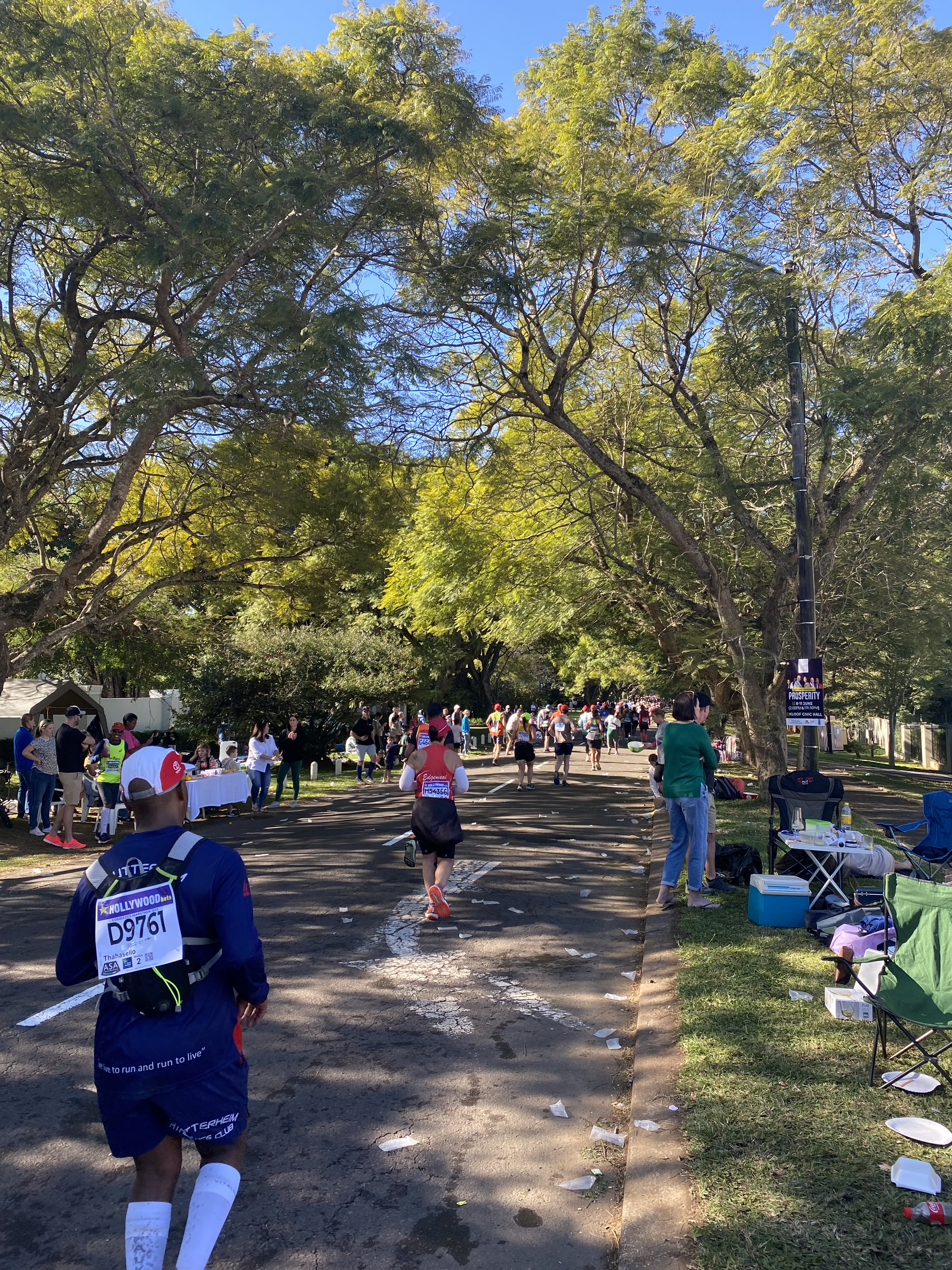
Runners in the 2023 Comrades Marathon on Old Main Road in Kloof, KwaZulu-Natal, near the M13 highway

== Schools ==
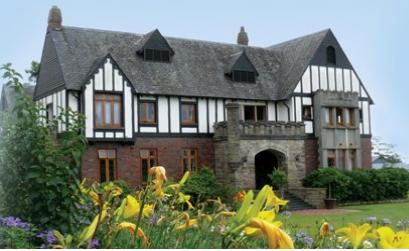
Thomas More College

Kloof has a state school network that consists of Kloof High School, Forest View Primary School, Kloof Senior Primary School, Kloof Junior Primary School and Kloof Pre-Primary School.

There are also several private schools located in Kloof including Thomas More College and St Mary's Diocesan School for Girls. In the broader area there is also Highbury Preparatory School in Hillcrest and Kearsney College in Botha's Hill.

== Wildlife ==
The many trees that define Kloof provide for an abundance of birds, including the Crowned eagle.

Other wildlife has been preserved in greenbelt areas such as the Krantzkloof Nature Reserve, which includes the Kloof Gorge, and the Everton Conservancy. The Reserve is centered on the main gorge cut by the eMolweni River, and extends in total 532 ha (1,315 ac). It was established by the Natal Parks Board in 1950.

The area around the gorge was once the habitat of leopards and a leopard features prominently on the Kloof crest. (The stuffed leopard in the Durban Museum reportedly was shot in the area). Chacma baboon were once re-introduced to the reserve, but unfortunately, after becoming troublesome, were removed. Bushpig may also be found in the reserve. Both would likely have formed part of the diet of the leopard. Many porcupine are still present in open areas like the local Kloof and Upper Highway SPCA grounds. Genets are often found in forest areas frequent trees looking for prey.

== Climate ==
Average yearly rainfall is 1,075 millimetres (42.3 in), based on records which date back to 1935. The rainy season is from the October to March summer months, while winters tend to be very dry.

Summer temperatures range from 18–32 °C (64–90 °F), with winter temperatures between 8–20 °C (46–68 °F).

== Botanical gardens ==
Private botanical gardens which were established by a well-known horticulturalist are now the gardens of a hotel known as the Makaranga Lodge after tall trees planted in the gardens. Visitors are able to arrange guided tours.

== The golf course ==
The Kloof Country Club includes a highly rated 18-hole golf course, which was the only golf course outside of Durban for many years. The M13 highway runs parallel to it.

== Places of interest ==
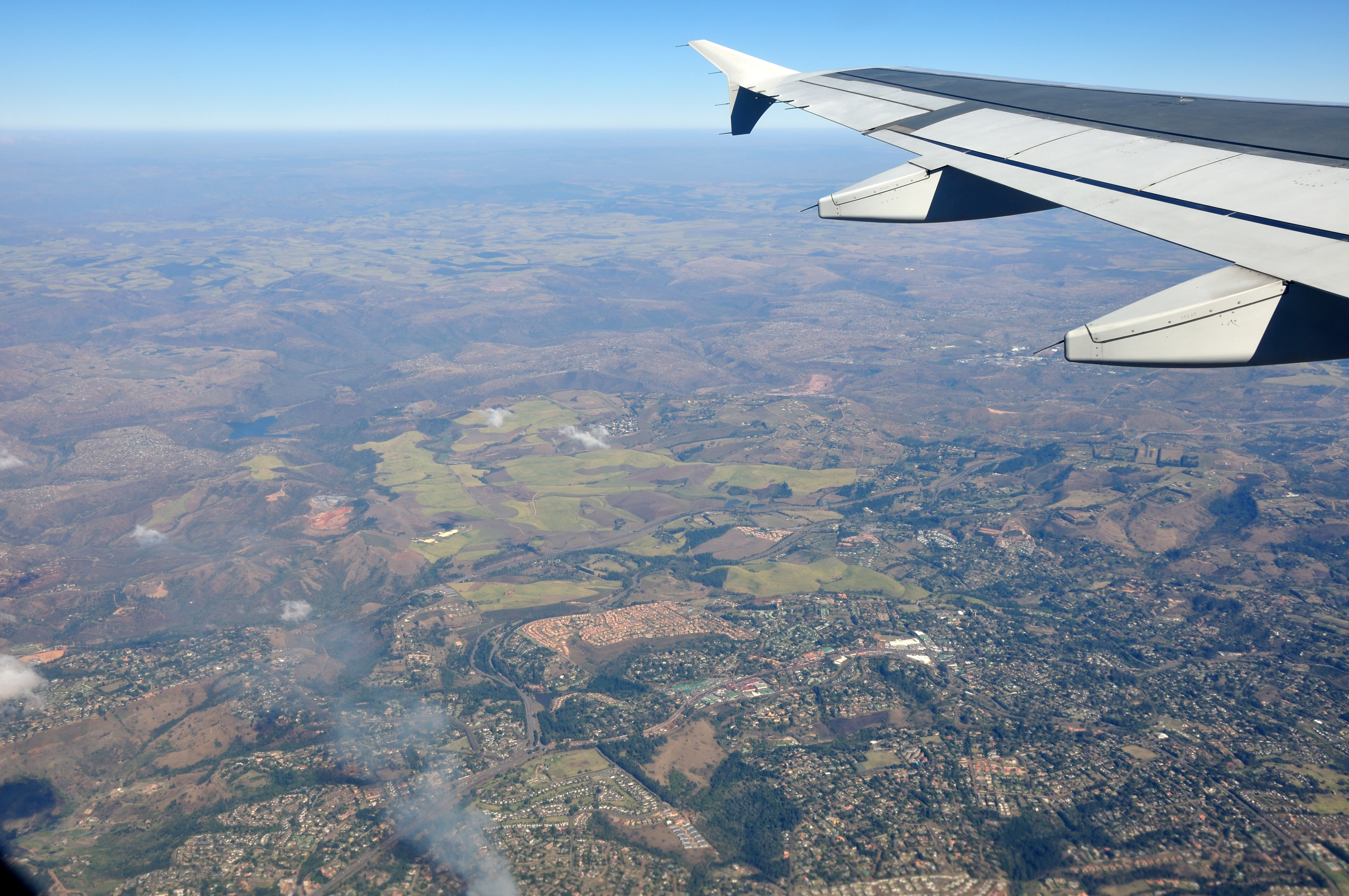
Plantations Estate in Hillcrest seen from the sky

The Krantzview Nature Reserve is also home to popular rock climbing routes which are used by beginners and experts. It is one of the stomping grounds of sport and traditional rock climbing and the gorge has hiking trails leading to viewpoints.

=== Shopping ===
- Delcairn Centre
- Field's Shopping Centre
- Maytime Shopping Centre
- The Village Mall
- Kloof & Upper Highway SPCA (Tea garden, Nursery, Secondhand shops, Animal Shelter, Trail walks)

=== Activity centres ===
- Kloof Country Club (golf course, tennis and squash courts, cricket oval, and facilities)
- Krantzkloof Nature Reserve and Kloof Gorge
- Nkonka Trust Nature Reserve
- Kloof Methodist Church
- Kloof Baptist Church
- Kloof Tennis Club
- St. Agnes Anglican Church, the church building, dating from the 1950s, was built on a piece of land on the farm section 'Glenholm', owned by T. S. P. Field and donated by him to the Anglican Diocese of Natal.
- Our Lady of Mercy Catholic Church
- Virgin Active gym (formerly Health & Racquet Club)
- Kloof Harvest Church
- Memorial Park (Also known as the dog park)
- West Point Church

== Famous residents: past and present ==
- Ladysmith Black Mambazo
- Peter Brown, politician
- Sir William Firth
- Marguerite Poland, author
- Bobby Skinstad, Springbok rugby player
- BJ Botha, Springbok rugby player
- Mike Hoare, Irish mercenary
- Alan Paton, writer and leader of the Liberal Party of South Africa in the 1960s and 1970s
- Simon Lessing, world triathlon champion
- Wally Hammond England and Gloucester cricketer died in Kloof 1 July 1965

== Sources ==
- Rowe, Adrian M. (13 May 2003). "A History of Kloof". Keep Kloof Beautiful Association. Archived from the original on 4 March 2016.
- The Highway Mail, 1 June 2011.
- The Hilltop, 2 June 2011.
- Independent Electoral Commission (South Africa), 9 June 2011.
