= Luthuli =

Luthuli is a name of southern African origin.

- Albert Luthuli (c. 1898–1967), South African Teacher, activist, politician and Nobel Peace Prize winner
- Luthuli Dlamini (born 1966), Zimbabwe-born South African film and television actor
- Bhekumuzi Luthuli (1961–2010), South African Maskandi musician
- Bhekizizwe Luthuli, South African politician
- Siphelele Luthuli (born 1995), South African professional soccer player

== See also ==
- Order of Luthuli
- Luthuli House
