= Waterfall, KwaZulu-Natal =

Waterfall
- Town
- Location within KwaZulu-Natal Location within South Africa
- Coordinates: 29°44′58″S 30°48′55″E
- Country: South Africa
- Province: KwaZulu-Natal
- Municipality: eThekwini

Area
  - Total: 14.4 km^{2} (5.6 sq mi)

Population (2011)
  - Total: 7,525
  - Density: 523/km^{2} (1,350/sq mi)

Racial makeup (2011)
  - Black African: 14.6%
  - Coloured: 1.3%
  - Indian/Asian: 1.7%
  - White: 81.7%
  - Other: 0.4%

First languages (2011)
  - English: 79.4%
  - Zulu: 9.9%
  - Afrikaans: 7.8%
  - Other: 2.9%
- Time zone: UTC+2 (SAST)
- Postal code (street): 3610
- PO box: 3652
- Area code: 031

Waterfall is a small town that lies north-east of Hillcrest in the province of KwaZulu-Natal, South Africa. Although Waterfall is officially regarded as a separate suburb from Hillcrest, it is often locally regarded as something of an extension of Hillcrest.

== Geography ==
Waterfall is situated in the Upper Highway Area of Durban, approximately 33 kilometres (20 mi) north-west of the city and is bordered by Hillcrest to the south-west, Kloof to the south-east and KwaNgcolosi and KwaNqetho to the north.

The main area of Waterfall consists of Waterfall proper and the smaller semi-rural suburbs of Berrel, Crestholme and Crestview which are largely made up of small holdings.

== Retail ==
Waterfall contains two shopping centres:

- Watercrest Mall is the largest shopping centre in the suburb, situated on Inanda Road. The regional shopping centre hosts over 130 stores, anchored by Checkers, Superspar, Woolworths, Clicks and Dis-Chem.
- Link Hills Lifestyle Centre is a convenience shopping centre located opposite Watercrest Mall on the corner of Inanda and Link Roads. The centre is anchored by Oxford Freshmarket, Mica and a Ford dealership.

== Transport ==
Inanda Road mainly intersects Waterfall connecting the suburb with Hillcrest to the south-west (numbered as the M33) and with Molweni to the north-east. Link Road, also numbered as the M33, connects Waterfall with Kloof to the south-east.
