= Hillcrest High School (South Africa) =

School in KwaZulu-Natal, South Africa

Coordinates: 29.77777°S 30.77607°E

- Hillcrest, KwaZulu-Natal; South Africa

Information
- Type: Public
- Motto: Adspirat Fortuna Labori
- Established: 1976
- Locale: Suburban
- Principal: Denise Knight
- Exam board: KZN
- Grades: 8–12
- Enrollment: 1200
- Colors: Blue, red and white
- Pupil-teacher ratio: 25:1
- Website: www.hhs.co.za

Hillcrest High School is a co-educational high school in Hillcrest, near Durban, in KwaZulu-Natal, South Africa.

== History ==
Hillcrest High School is a co-educational high school situated 2,5 km from the centre of Hillcrest and 35 km from Durban.

Hillcrest High had its origins at Hillcrest Primary School where, for a number of years, Grade 8 and 9 classes were accommodated. Hillcrest High opened its doors for the first time on 20 January 1976 with an enrolment of 276 learners and a staff of 18. The school was officially opened in October 1976 by the then Director of Education, Mr P R T Nel.

The founding principal, Mr Clive Talbot, served the school for nearly two years before being promoted to Head Office. Mr Talbot's successors have been:

- Mr Phillip Hawkins
- Mr Malcom Garrett
- Mr Gerald Delport
- Mr Craig Girvin
- Mrs Denise Knight

The school has a student population just under 1200, and academic staff of more than 52.

Over the years the school has had learners in the top 30 candidates in the Natal Senior Certificate examinations, has obtained Matric exemption rates of up to 80%, has featured consistently in academic extension olympiads. Learners have represented KwaZulu-Natal in sports and cultural activities.

The school was the first in KwaZulu-Natal to introduce the Craft, Design and Technology subject in 1991, a bridging programme in 1992, Teacher Assistant programme in 1993, and Zulu for all Grade 8 and 9 learners in 2000.

Sports facilities include three netball courts, a quarter astro turf, four hockey fields, two rugby/soccer fields, three cricket pitches and a multi-purpose indoor centre. The Inanda Road property is used for hockey, cricket and soccer.

Parents were largely responsible for the levelling and grassing of the Belvedere Field which was opened in 1984. The most successful fund raising ventures to date have provided a swimming pool opened in 1986, a Media Centre opened in 1987 and the multi-purpose indoor centre opened in 2020. 1991 saw the completion of two Art Studios and The Cage Theatre.

During 1999 the school's governing body embarked on a major upgrade of the school's Information Technology facilities. Structural improvements were made to the library to allow the installation of more computers for research and Internet access. A new server and 30 computers were installed in the Computer Room. 25 more computers were installed in the Typing Room to allow the introduction of Computyping, a subject which teaches word processing instead of typing.

In February 1991 the parents of the school voted to assume Model B status, opening the doors to learners of all race groups. In August 1992, along with most schools controlled by the Department of Education and Culture (House of Assembly), Hillcrest High became a state-aided school. The management and control of the school is invested in its Governing Body. In terms of the South African Schools Act of 1996, Hillcrest High is now a public school.

== Academics ==
School-leavers write the KwaZulu-Natal Department of Education exams.

Matric results	1999	2000	2001	2002	2003	2004	2005	2006	2007	2008	2009	2010	2011	2012	2013	2014	2015	2016	2017	2018	2019	2020	2021
Number of candidates	168	169	153	166	166	178	155	170	-	-	-	-	-	-	-	-	-	-	-	-	-	-	-
Number of failures	0	0	2	2	0	0	2	3	-	-	-	-	-	-	-	-	-	-	-	-	-	-	-
University endorsement (%)	80	76	67	58	68	70	70	76	-	-	-	-	-	-	-	-	-	-	-	-	-	-	-
A aggregates (%)	9.5	10.7	11	6	10	14	12	9	-	-	-	-	-	-	-	-	-	-	-	-	-	-	-
A-B-C aggregates (%)	66.7	69.8	58.2	53	68.7	61.8	65.2	63	-	-	-	-	-	-	-	-	-	-	-	-	-	-	-
Subject distinctions	111	103	102	109	147	178	151	159	-	-	-	-	-	-	-	-	-	-	-	-	-	-	-

== Sports ==
Include rugby, rugby 7s, touch rugby, badminton, tennis, equestrian, soccer, chess, swimming, cricket and indoor and outdoor hockey.

== Cultural ==
There are a range of clubs and societies running within the school, including fishing and eco tourism and below:

Photography, Toastmasters and Media Centre
