= Gillitts =

- Town
- Location within KwaZulu-Natal Location within South Africa
- Coordinates: 29°47′50″S 30°47′40″E
- Country: South Africa
- Province: KwaZulu-Natal
- Municipality: eThekwini

Government
  - Ward Councillor: Rick Crouch (Democratic Alliance)

Area
  - Total: 11.54 km^{2} (4.46 sq mi)

Population (2011)
  - Total: 8,661
  - Density: 750.5/km^{2} (1,944/sq mi)

Racial makeup (2011)
  - Black African: 11.4%
  - Coloured: 0.8%
  - Indian/Asian: 2.4%
  - White: 85.1%
  - Other: 0.3%

First languages (2011)
  - English: 84.2%
  - Afrikaans: 7.1%
  - Zulu: 5.6%
  - Other: 3.1%
- Time zone: UTC+2 (SAST)
- Postal code (street): 3610
- PO box: 3603

Gillitts is a town in the KwaZulu-Natal Province of South Africa.

== Overview ==
It is about 22 miles (35 km) inland from the Durban city centre at an elevation of 1800 feet (600 m ASL). Although Durban is semi-tropical and very humid, Gillitts is above the humidity and is not humid, except when it is in the clouds, which generally occurs in summer. It is in the mist belt area, so this area gets a fair amount of mist which many of the residents complain about.

It is positioned near the currently burgeoning Hillcrest and Kloof. The whole area is known as the Upper Highway Area as the M13 highway intersects it.

While some residents do seem to complain about the mist, it does usually come as a welcome relief to the intense humidity of the area.

Gillitts has remained fairly stable while Kloof and Hillcrest in the surrounding areas are growing quite rapidly. This can be attributable to the fact that there is very little area for Gillitts to grow and as a result of growing in a very organic way it has maintained its rural atmosphere till this day.

Gillitts originated as an extensive farm that extended over the whole of the Upper Highway area, but over time, the farm was sold off and now only the 100-year-old farmhouse remains inside the Gillitts Driving Range and 9-hole, mashie golf course. This golf course is one of the best designed courses of its size in KZN.

The area of Gillitts extends along either side of the M13 highway which stretches from Durban to Assagay. The M13 replaced the Old Main Road between the two cities, and a section of Old Main Road is now the major road through the south side of Gillitts.

Off of Stockville Road – one of the other main roads in Gillitts suburb – a large ethnic Indian population lives, and over the traditional Indian festivals, fireworks are very prominent as part of their celebrations, especially over Diwali and New Years.

On the northern side of the M13, known as Gillitts Park, the old train line from Durban to Pietermaritzburg winds through the residential areas. This train line is no longer in regular use, and is only used by the Umgeni Steam Railway, who runs a tourist service of carriages through from Kloof Train Station to Cato Ridge on the last Sunday of every month. This train is pulled by 'Maureen', a restored Class 3BR No. 1486 steam engine built in 1912 and the sound of the train whistle echoing through the neighbourhood on a Sunday morning is a reminder of a quieter time of life.

The Gillitts Train Station on the line in the middle of Gillitts is derelict and currently not used, but is a beautiful example of 1900-era architecture. Dating back to the Boer War in the first decade of the 20th century, the train station was a stop for British soldiers transiting from Durban through to the Midland battlefields as well as returning wounded soldiers.

During the Boer War, the Gillitts family farm held a garrison of British troops, who built a small dam for water and a camp in what is now Camp Road. The dam still exists in a natural park amongst the houses on what is now Ashley Drive and contains bass, barbel and other fish species as well as supporting a variety of other waterfowl.

The Gillitts Conservancy is a very active organisation who manages the Iphithi Nature Reserve in the middle of northern Gillitts. This nature reserve is a success story. Situated in a valley between two roads, it was a stand of invader species Blue Gum trees for 50 years until 2001. The residents bordering the valley organised a committee and contracted a logger to fell the Blue Gums. As the wood was valuable as timber, the committee was paid a lump sum which it used to found the nature reserve, fence off the additional entrances and pay for the laying of paths, building of viewing decks and planting of indigenous species. Today the Iphithi Nature Reserve is a 15 Hectare stand of indigenous forest, wetland and grasslands and home to many species of birds, small mammals and even a dam has been built which is populated with fish. The walks and park benches are popular with the residents and the park is quite heavily used on weekends.

Residential plots in Gillitts are generally at least half an acre, and the area has few cluster developments and no commercial or industrial development. Indigenous wildlife in the area includes birds, small antelope, duiker, iphithi and porcupine.

In the first six months of 2009, we have seen an upsurge in housebreakings in the area. Traditionally an out-of-the-way neighbourhood, Gillitts Park has been largely spared the crime problems that the rest of the country has experienced. The recent upsurge in incidents has led to the formation of a neighbourhood watch association. Called the Gillitts Park Streetwatch, this organisation is composed of residents who have contracted a service provider to provide cellphone communications links between members. By watching out for each other and working with local law enforcement, the 860-home neighbourhood saw nine arrests of housebreakers in four weeks. The crime rate has since dropped off.

== Gillitts Park ==
Gillitts Park is a small residential suburb of Durban, South Africa. Comprising the northern half of the suburb of Gillitts, Gillitts Park is a green belt residential area with almost no commercial development and no industrial development. In its entirety, Gillitts Park consists of about 900 homes in freehold, residential sites with a minimum plot size of 0.5 acres (2,000 m^{2}). There are also about 200 cluster developmentunits scattered through the neighbourhood, the most prominent being Augusta Golf Estate. Situated about 30 kilometres (19 mi) inland from Durban and at an altitude of 600 metres (2,000 ft) above sea level, Gillitts Park experiences a warm year-round climate, with no frost or snow in winter and drastically reduced humidity when compared with the coastal suburbs. Commercial development is limited to home-offices, a small, single-storey office building and the Emberton Mashie Golf Course, 9-hole course as well as a driving range and coffee shop.

Having experienced an upsurge in residential housebreakings during the first half of 2009, residents banded together to form the Gillitts Park Streetwatch. This organisation is a 'Neighbourhood Watch'-type structure, with the additional function of re-creating a sense of community and maintaining the beautiful environment of the area.

== Sources ==
- The Highway Mail, 1 June 2011.
- The Hilltop, 2 June 2011.
- Independent Electoral Commission (South Africa), 9 June 2011.
