= Assagay =

Suburb of eThekwini in KwaZulu-Natal, South Africa

- Suburb
- Location within KwaZulu-Natal Location within South Africa
- Coordinates: 29°47′S 30°44′E
- Country: South Africa
- Province: KwaZulu-Natal
- Municipality: eThekwini

Government
  - Type: Ward 103
  - Councillor: Richard Phewa

Area
  - Total: 11.66 km^{2} (4.50 sq mi)

Population (2011)
  - Total: 3,156
  - Density: 270.7/km^{2} (701.0/sq mi)

Racial makeup (2011)
  - Black African: 17.4%
  - Coloured: 1.3%
  - Indian/Asian: 2.4%
  - White: 78.4%
  - Other: 0.5%

First languages (2011)
  - English: 79.8%
  - Afrikaans: 8.5%
  - Zulu: 7.0%
  - Xhosa: 1.6%
  - Other: 3.1%
- Time zone: UTC+2 (SAST)
- Postal code (street): 3610
- PO box: 3624

Assagay, also spelt Assegay, is a suburb of eThekwini in KwaZulu-Natal, South Africa and forms a part of the Upper Highway Area.

== History ==
Assagay was formerly a small local authority on the outskirts of Durban adjacent to its sister village of Hillcrest and has now effectively become part of that booming suburb of Durban. Assagay lost its independent Health Committee status in 1996, i.e. after the 1994 fully democratic elections, and was made subject to administration by the Outer West Local Council - a substructure council of the then Durban Unicity. Subsequently in 2000 this body, i.e. the Outer West Local Council, along with other local councils, were disestablished and replaced by the single eThekwini Municipality encompassing the entire Durban metropolitan area.

== Assagay today ==
Assagay has access to both the M13 and N3 freeway systems linking it directly with Durban and Pietermaritzburg, and Kassier Road links it via Old Main Road to the central commercial area of Hillcrest.

The suburb of Assagay had become known as a middle-income residential area containing a mixture of individual houses, small holdings and small town house complexes; however, the considerable development in the greater Hillcrest area, over the past 10 years, has tended to change this image of the area. Large secure gated estates such as Queensbridge, Silver Oaks, Highmead and the nearby Aintree Lane residential development at Shongweni surrounding the Assagay Hotel (previously known as the Polo Pony Hotel) have seen the character change to more of a high-income area. The PheZulu Safari Park and the currently developing Stoneford Equestrian Estate is in Assagay and borders on Alverstone which is situated on the plateau of that name.

The new Hillcrest Private Hospital which is now operational and a Retirement Village which is under construction has easy access to the M13. These developments have further boosted the property values in this up-market area.

International Polo (sponsored by BMW) is played to the Shongweni Polo Ground opposite the Assagay Hotel.

=== Conservation and the environment ===
The Assagay valley forms the original catchment area of the Umhlatuzana river which flows through the Madwala Reserves. Working for Water has made a contribution towards clearing the area of invasive plants and continues to eradicate all alien flora with the cooperation of landowners.

== Origin of name ==
Assagay is perhaps more commonly spelled as "assegai". The name for the village of Assagay will have in turn been taken from the underlying farm named Assagay Kraal. The Voortrekkers having named the early farms in their Natalia Republic (Natal) after settling throughout the area in 1839 after defeating the Zulu king Dingane. The parcels of land comprising the adjacent Alverstone area are still portions of the farm Assagay Kraal No 853.
