= Botha's Hill =

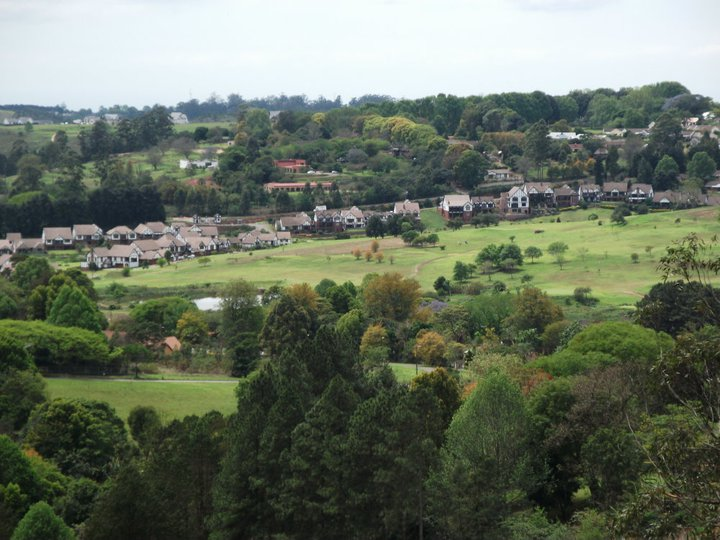
- Botha's Hill in 2010

- Location within KwaZulu-Natal Location within South Africa
- Coordinates: 29°45′7.2″S 30°44′24″E
- Country: South Africa
- Province: KwaZulu-Natal
- Municipality: eThekwini

Government
  - Type: Ward 103
  - Councillor: Jeffrey Mchunu (ANC)

Area
  - Total: 3.85 km^{2} (1.49 sq mi)

Population (2011)
  - Total: 2,673
  - Density: 694/km^{2} (1,800/sq mi)

Racial makeup (2011)
  - Black African: 49.6%
  - Coloured: 1.1%
  - Indian/Asian: 5.1%
  - White: 43.5%
  - Other: 0.6%

First languages (2011)
  - Zulu: 47.0%
  - English: 43.0%
  - Afrikaans: 3.4%
  - Other: 6.6%
- Time zone: UTC+2 (SAST)
- Postal code (street): 3610
- PO box: 3660
- Area code: 031

Botha's Hill (locally /ˈbʊərtə-/, Afrikaans: [ˈbuəta]) is a small town outside Hillcrest in KwaZulu-Natal, South Africa. It remains a peaceful beautiful hill where regular country style food and craft markets are held. It is the gateway to the Valley of a Thousand Hills. Kearsney College moved to Botha's Hill in 1939. Alan Paton, the author of Cry, the Beloved Country and Too Late the Phalarope lived here until his death on 12 April 1988.

The village is 37 km north-west of Durban, on the old main road to Pietermaritzburg.

There have been different opinions about the origin of the name of Botha's Hill. The Dictionary of Southern African Place Names claims it was named after a settler, Philip Rudolph Botha, grandfather of General Louis Botha (1862–1919), first Prime Minister of the Union of South Africa. Research undertaken by Robin W. Lamplough and published in the journal of the Natal Society, suggests that Botha's Hill was named after Cornelis Botha, a former harbour master of Port Natal.

== Gallery ==
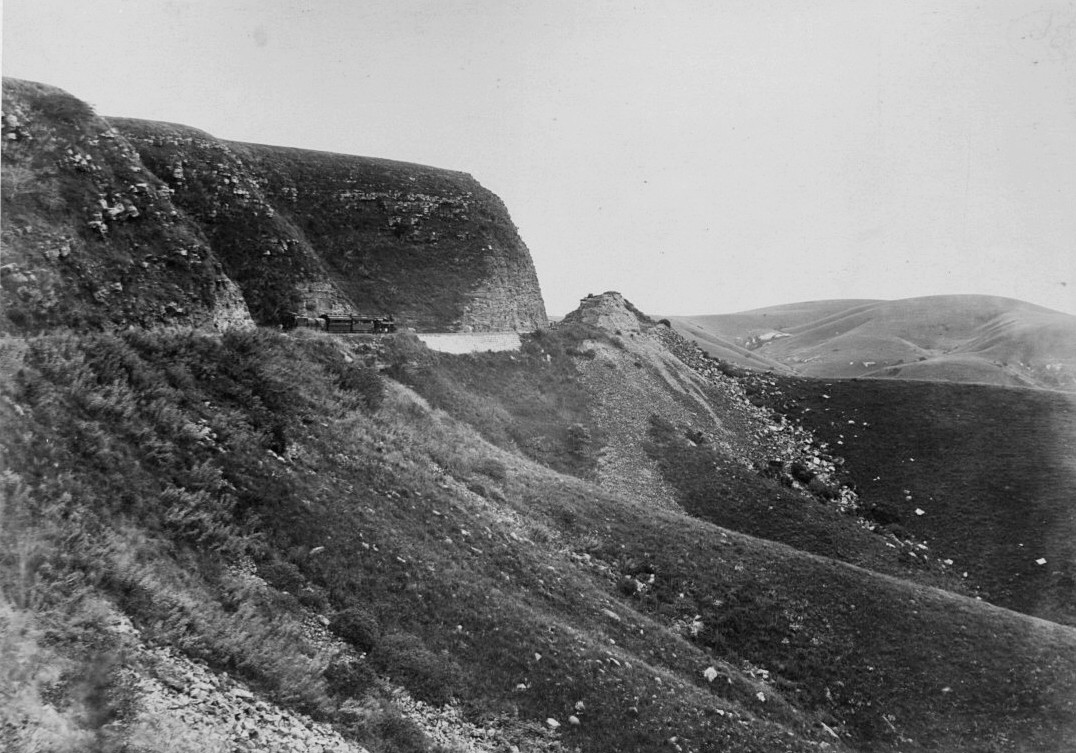
Railway, Bothas Hill

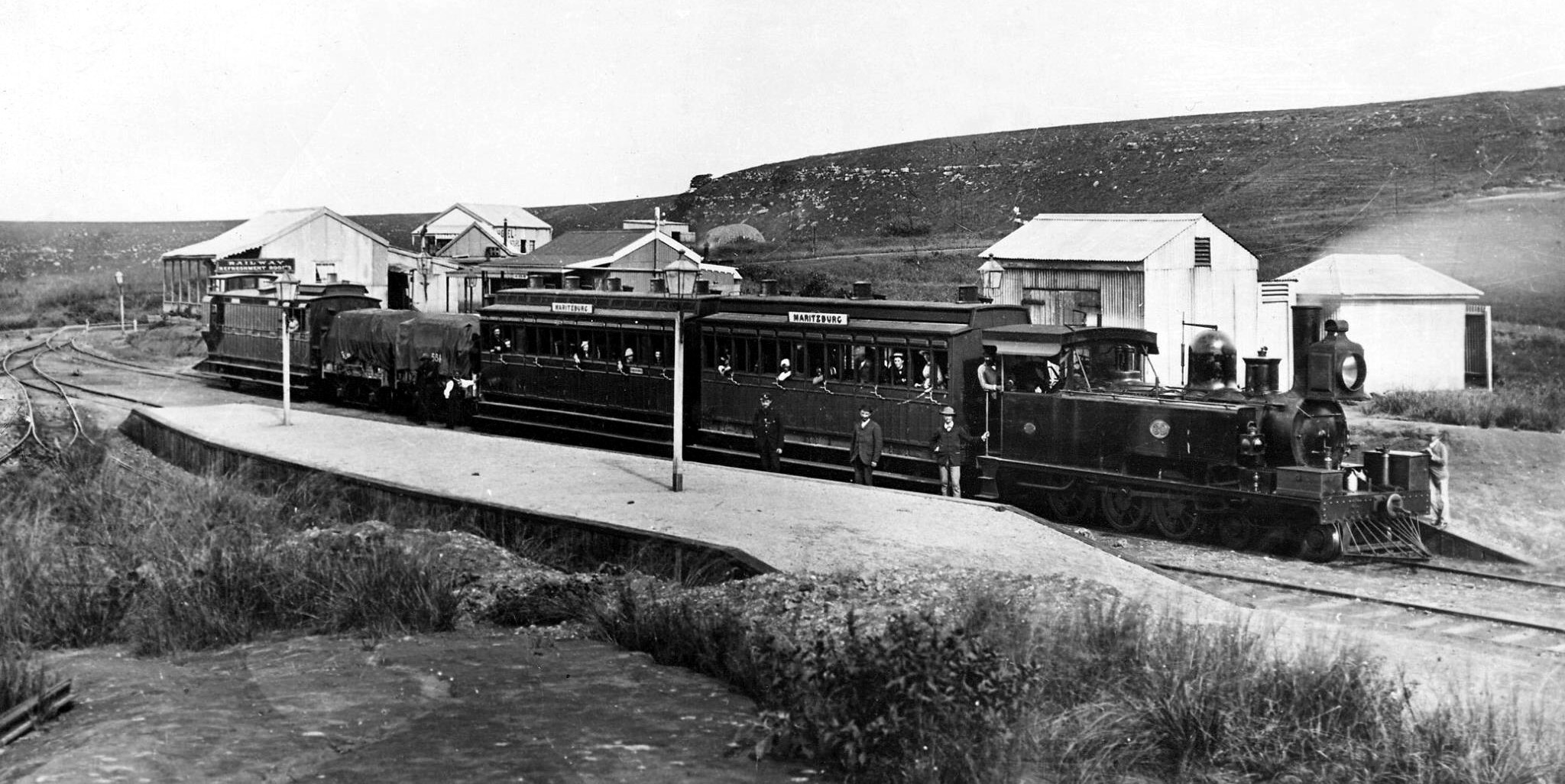
Railway station Bothas Hill (app. 1890)

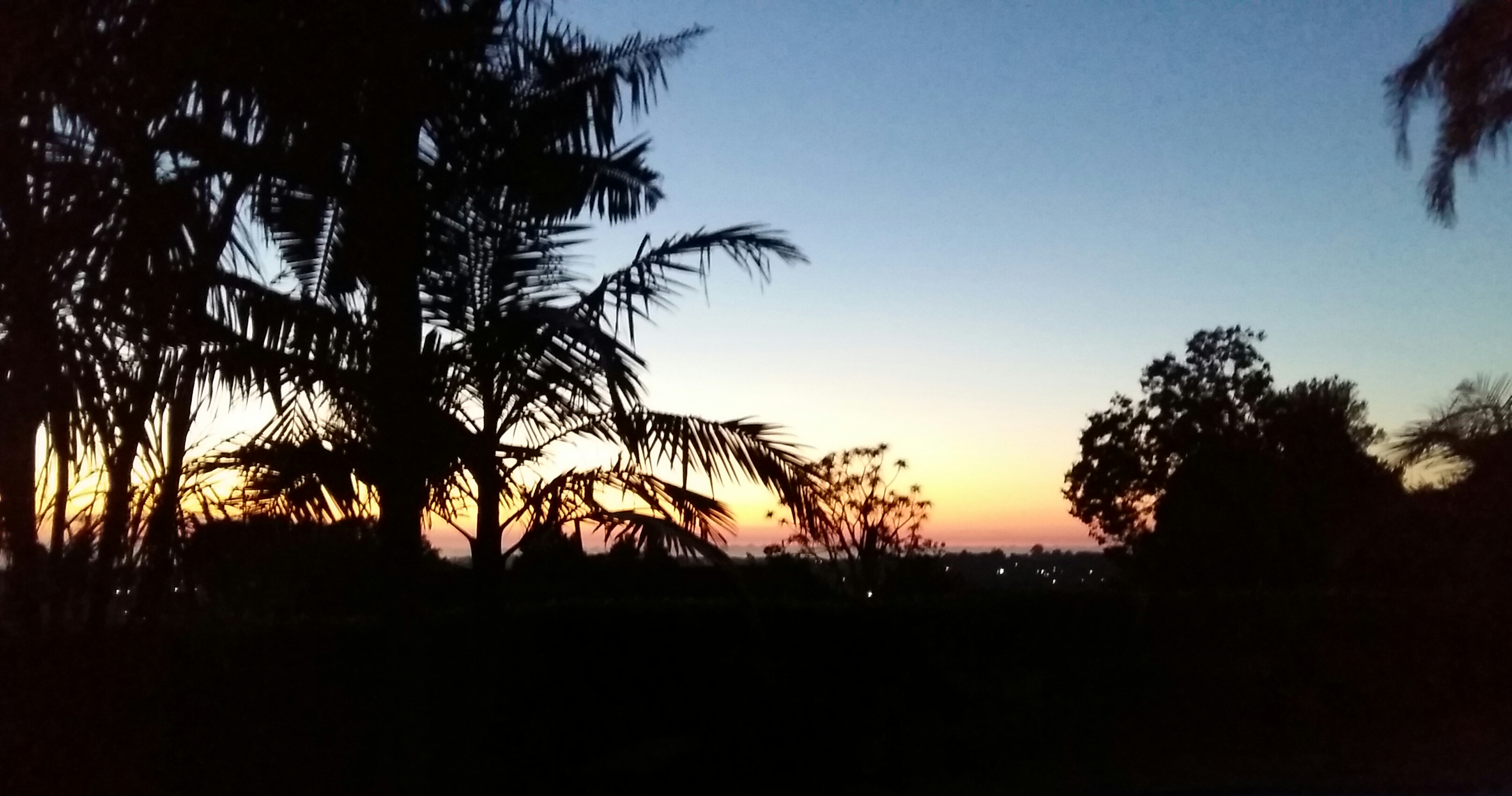
