= Hillcrest, KwaZulu-Natal =

Hillcrest
- Town
- Location within KwaZulu-Natal Location within South Africa
- Coordinates: 29°46′48″S 30°45′46″E
- Country: South Africa
- Province: KwaZulu-Natal
- Municipality: eThekwini
- Established: 22 January 1895

Government
  - Ward Councillor: Caelee Jane Laing (Democratic Alliance)

Area
  - Total: 21.44 km^{2} (8.28 sq mi)

Population (2011)
  - Total: 13,329
  - Density: 621.7/km^{2} (1,610/sq mi)

Racial makeup (2011)
  - Black African: 11.4%
  - Coloured: 0.8%
  - Indian/Asian: 3.0%
  - White: 84.3%
  - Other: 0.6%

First languages (2011)
  - English: 82.7%
  - Afrikaans: 7.6%
  - Zulu: 6.9%
  - Other: 2.9%
- Time zone: UTC+2 (SAST)
- Postal code (street): 3610
- PO box: 3650
- Area code: 031

Hillcrest is a town in the KwaZulu-Natal province of South Africa. Forming part of the eThekwini Metropolitan Municipality, Hillcrest is situated approximately 32 km (20 mi) north-west of Durban, and 53 km (33 mi) south-east of Pietermaritzburg.

== History ==
Hillcrest was formerly a sleepy village, governed by its own Town Board on the outskirts of Durban that has now become a booming suburb incorporated into the eThekwini Metropolitan Municipality. Hill Crest (as the town's name was variously spelt until 1969) was founded on a rise in the main road from Durban to Pietermaritzburg in 1895 as a farming or "weekend" village, then a good distance from what was the emerging port of Port Natal. The village was laid out as leasehold sites on a portion of the farm Albinia owned by William Gillitt, one of the main pioneer families of the area and after which the nearby suburb of Gillitts is named.

One of the other early families to set up in the area was the Acutts who had already established the well known in Durban estate agents firm of that name. In 1903 the first school in the village was established in a wood and iron cottage in Hospital Road leased to Mrs McMillian, the principal of the first Highbury School, by Horace Acutt.

When the first Hillcrest Health Committee was established in 1943, the total all-race population was 1135 persons and only the Main Road was hardened. Nkutu Road was hardened with klinker in 1947 and this was followed in 1951 with the hardening of the first portion of Inanda Road. In 1962 blacktopping of selected roads in the central area began, followed by further roads in 1965. By 1971, when Town Board status was obtained, the total population had grown to 2799 persons.

The Hillcrest Waste Water Treatment Plant was established in the 1990s, then serving only the central commercial area of the village with phased extensions planned in time, with other areas continuing on septic tanks.

Before 1 December 2023, vehicle registration plates in Hillcrest started with NU - N for Natal, U for Upper Highway which covered the suburbs within the Upper Highway Area such as Kloof, Gillitts, Botha's Hill, Assagay, Waterfall and Everton as well as New Germany and Queensburgh just outside the Upper Highway.

== Hillcrest today ==
Hillcrest lost its independent Town Board status in 1996 and was made subject to administration by the Outer West Local Council - a substructure council of the then Durban Unicity. In 2000, the Outer West Local Council, along with other local councils, was disestablished and was replaced by the single eThekwini Municipality encompassing the entire Durban metropolitan area.

With rural origins, Hillcrest has been swept up in Durban's urban sprawl and experienced a building boom in the late 1990s and 2000s with the construction of many shopping centres and gated communities such as Cotswold Downs, Camelot and Plantations.

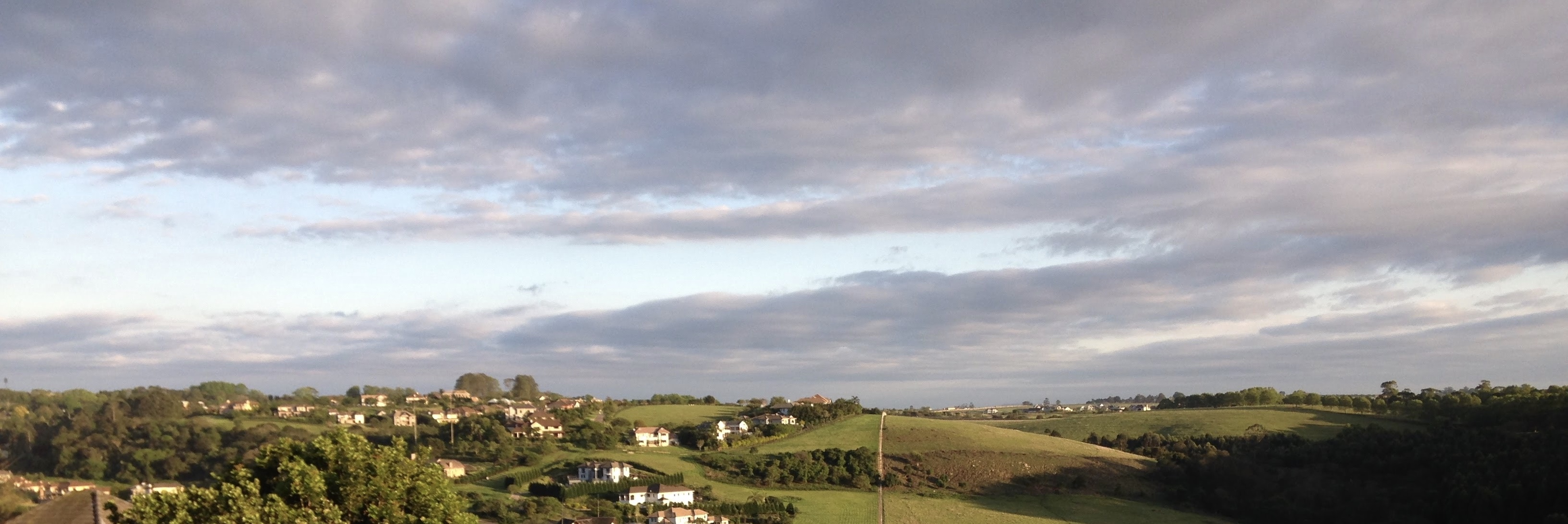
View of Inanda Road in Hillcrest

== Geography ==
Hillcrest is situated in the Upper Highway Area of Durban, approximately 32 kilometres (20 mi) north-west of the city and is bordered by Gillitts and Everton to the east, Waterfall to the north-east and Botha's Hill and Assagay to the north-west. It lies at an altitude of approximately 680 m (2231 ft) above sea level in the Valley of a Thousand Hills, just above Durban.

=== Suburban areas ===
- Albany (Residential)
- Albina (Residential)
- Belvedere (Residential)
- Belvedere Ext 1 (Residential)
- Cotswold Downs Golf and Country Estate (Residential)
- Hilldene (Residential)
- Plantations (Residential)
- West Riding (Residential)

== Retail ==
Old Main Road is the main retail thoroughfare of the central business district, lined by several local shops, restaurants and shopping centres such as Hillcrest Corner, which is the largest in Hillcrest, Christians Village, The Colony, Hillgate, Hillcrest Centre, Lillies Quarter and Oxford Village Centre.

On 27 March 2025, the Greater Hillcrest area welcomed the new Westown Square Shopping Centre in Westown, Shongweni, 4 km to the south-west of Hillcrest. Another shopping centre, Cotswold Square in Cotswold Downs to the north-east, is expected to open its doors in July 2025.

== Safety ==
Hillcrest Police Station is located on Paddock Road and adjacent to Old Main Road with its large SAPS policing precinct covering Hillcrest, Gillitts, Everton, Waterfall, Ngcolosi, Botha’s Hill, Shongweni and Summerveld.

== Infrastructure ==
=== Education ===
A public school system is provided in Hillcrest including Hillcrest High School and Hillcrest Primary School, with Winston Park Primary School in nearby Winston Park.

Private schools include Highbury Preparatory School, Curro: HCA and Waterfall Schools with Kearsney College and the Roseway Waldorf School in nearby Botha's Hill and Alverstone respectively.

=== Healthcare ===
Hillcrest is served by two hospitals, namely the Hillcrest Hospital, a specialised public hospital for chronically ill patients and the Busamed Hillcrest Private Hospital, owned by major South African private health group, Busamed, located just outside Hillcrest.

=== Transport ===
==== Roads ====
Hillcrest lies just off the M13 (King Cetshwayo Highway) heading south-east to Durban (via Gillitts, Kloof, Pinetown and Westville) and the N3 (Mariannhill Toll Route) connecting Durban and Pietermaritzburg.

However, the main route through the town is the R103 (Old Main Road) which heads north-west to Botha’s Hill and Inchanga, forming part of the old main road between Durban and Pietermaritzburg. Heading north-west, the M33 (Inanda Road) connects to Waterfall. Heading south-west, the M46 (Kassier Road) connects to Assagay and Shongweni.

== Notable residents ==
- Dale Benkenstein, Nashua Dolphins cricket player
- Wayne Fyvie, former Sharks and SA national rugby player
- Ian McIntosh, former Rhodesian, Sharks and SA national rugby coach
- Shaun Pollock, former Dolphins and SA national cricket player and captain
- Terence Parkin, Olympic medalist
- Heather Hamilton, Miss South Africa 1999, Miss Universe top 10 1999, Miss World contestant 2000
- Megan Coleman, Miss South Africa 2006, Miss Universe 2007, Miss World contestant 2007
- Harold 'Tiger' Wright, South African Champion Jockey
- Sir Liege Hulett, Founder of Kearsney College, founder of Hulett's Sugar.
- Horace Smethurst, Springbok Soccer Captain, Australia New Zealand Tour 1947, soccer player

== Sources ==
- Lest We Forget - The Story of Hillcrest 1895 - 1995, Elizabeth Camp, c. 1996
- Hillcrest Gillitts Activity Corridor Local Development Plan - Outer West Local Council, 2000
- The Highway Mail, 1 June 2011.
- The Hilltop, 2 June 2011.
- Independent Electoral Commission (South Africa), 9 June 2011.
