= EThekwini Metropolitan Municipality =

eThekwini iTheku Durban
- Metropolitan municipality
- City of eThekwini Metropolitan Municipality
- Seal

- Location in KwaZulu-Natal
- Coordinates: 29°52′S 31°01′E
- Country: South Africa
- Province: KwaZulu-Natal
- Seat: Durban
- Wards: 103

Government
  - Type: Municipal council
  - Mayor: Cyril Xaba (ANC)
  - Deputy Mayor: Zandile Myeni (NFP)
  - Speaker: Thabang Nyawose (ANC)

Area
  - Total: 2,291.31 km^{2} (884.68 sq mi)

Population (2022)
  - Total: 4,239,901
  - Density: 1,850.43/km^{2} (4,792.58/sq mi)

Racial makeup (2022)
  - Black African: 72.2%
  - Coloured: 2.5%
  - Indian/Asian: 19.7%
  - White: 6.0%

First languages (2011)
  - Zulu: 62.8%
  - English: 26.8%
  - Xhosa: 3.9%
  - Afrikaans: 1.7%
  - Ndebele: 1.1%
  - Other: 3.7%
- Time zone: UTC+2 (SAST)
- Municipal code: ETH

The eThekwini Metropolitan Municipality (Zulu: UMasipala weDolobhakazi laseThekwini) is a metropolitan municipality, created in 2000, that includes the city of Durban and surrounding towns. eThekwini is one of the 11 districts of the KwaZulu-Natal province of South Africa. As of 2011, the majority of its 3,442,361 inhabitants spoke isiZulu.

== Etymology ==
In an 1859 Zulu grammar book, Bishop Colenso asserted that the root word iTeku means 'bay of the sea', from the name Mtheku, used by the Thabethe tribes clan, who were the leaders of the Nguni people. Furthermore the original local inhabitants noted that the locative form, eThekwini, was used as a proper name for Durban.

An 1895 English-Zulu dictionary translates the base word iteku as 'bay', 'creek', 'gulf' or 'sinus', while a 1905 Zulu-English dictionary notes that eTekwini is used for Durban.

== Geography ==
eThekwini is surrounded by:

- iLembe (DC29) to the north
- the Indian Ocean to the east
- Ugu (DC21) to the south
- Umgungundlovu (DC22) to the west

== Main places ==
The 2001 census divided the municipality into the following main places:

Place	Code	Area (km^{2})	Population	Most spoken language
Adams Rural	599179	31.15	31,164	Zulu
Amagcino	599188	0.64	940	Zulu
Amanzimtoti	599173	9.19	13,813	Zulu
Baphehli	599185	6.71	11,834	Zulu
Bhekulwandle	599184	2.11	4,859	Zulu
Blackburn	599050	29.68	23,960	Zulu
Botha's Hill	599109	0.55	2,190	Zulu
Cato Ridge	599092	20.18	3,874	Zulu
Chatsworth	599161	42.73	196,580	English
Chuphulaka	599021	1.42	275	Zulu
Cibane	599006	8.46	812	Zulu
Clansthal	599194	18.75	3,211	Zulu
Clermont	599114	6.94	52,075	Zulu
Cliffdale	599098	8.05	2,298	Zulu
Clifton Heights	599098	0.3	47	Zulu
Congo	599098	0.44	1,479	Zulu
Craigieburn	599195	12.7	7,574	English
Danganya	599190	2	1,847	Zulu
Denge	599093	1.91	2,068	Zulu
Desainager	599015	1.45	984	Zulu
Dimane	599069	1.9	615	Zulu
Diphini	599082	0.41	1,626	Zulu
Drummond	599097	7.72	955	English
Durban	599054	225.91	595,061	English
Ebhobhonono	599044	2.65	3,207	Zulu
Ediphini Section	599149	1.16	963	Zulu
Egwadeni Section	599141	0.61	699	Zulu
Ehlanzeni	599162	6.92	3,277	Zulu
Ekwandeni	599136	2.75	4,892	Zulu
eMachobeni	599057	9.25	8,321	Zulu
Emagezeni	599140	0.82	1,192	Zulu
Emalangeni	599126	2.54	7,009	Zulu
Emangabazini	599146	1.01	1,988	Zulu
Emvini	599023	7.06	2,905	Zulu
Esidweni	599164	8.66	1,240	Zulu
Esikhelekehleni	599081	4.29	3,629	Zulu
Ethekwini	599187	13.07	1,803	English
Ethekwini NU	599187	434.38	11,200	Zulu
Everton	599101	4.5	870	English
Ezakhiweni	599147	0.51	1,274	Zulu
Ezihyathini	599159	2.26	729	Zulu
Ezimangweni	599183	1.09	4,107	Zulu
Ezimbokodweni	599180	3.66	12,882	Zulu
Ezimpisini	599155	3.48	788	Zulu
Ezinyathini	599165	3.46	1,497	Zulu
Ezitendeni	599125	0.63	1,542	Zulu
Folweni	599125	3.4	30,402	Zulu
Gasa Section	599086	0.56	1,442	Zulu
Genazzano	599013	1.04	2,585	English
Georgedale	599120	3.12	10,354	Zulu
Gillitts	599117	11.54	8,661	English
Golokodo	599177	14.44	35,055	Zulu
Greylands	599001	14.03	2,185	Xhosa
Gunjini	599011	16.14	8,031	Zulu
Hambanathi	599003	3.75	10,755	Zulu
Harare A	599087	0.47	1,021	Zulu
Harare B	599088	0.55	1,652	Zulu
Hazelmere	599019	2.34	6,751	Zulu
Hillcrest	599100	21.44	13,329	English
Illovo North	599186	8.29	24,728	Zulu
Imbozamo	599025	22.65	3,217	Zulu
Inanda (Inanda Congo)	599036	1.22	10,032	Zulu
Inanda A	599037	26.81	158,619	Zulu
Inanda B	599077	8.03	9,767	Zulu
Inchanga	599096	3.29	1,008	English
Inkangala	599007	13.6	745	Zulu
Inthuthuko	599066	2.65	710	Zulu
Inwabi	599156	34.84	9,030	Zulu
Iqadi B	599040	2.77	1,029	Zulu
Isiqhoqhoqho	599134	2.45	1,725	Zulu
Iziko	599182	0.8	4,369	Zulu
Kamba	599118	0.19	266	Zulu
Kingsburgh	599172	11.65	16,368	English
Klaarwater	599158	13.53	26,157	Zulu
Kloof	599102	34.51	29,704	English
Kontinga	599142	0.41	796	Zulu
KwaCele	599089	0.7	2,543	Zulu
KwaDabeka	599113	11.87	54,953	Zulu
KwaDlembe	599128	1.83	1,632	Zulu
KwaLandeza	599124	0.31	1,947	Zulu
KwaMashu	599055	21.47	175,663	Zulu
KwaMbiza	599133	1.57	2,377	Zulu
KwaMtamtengayo	599166	7.44	1,443	Zulu
KwaNdengezi	599139	13.99	53,843	Zulu
KwaNgcolosi	599064	2.61	918	Zulu
KwaNqetho	599078	3.97	3,977	Zulu
Kwantamnteng	599167	1.58	240	Zulu
KwaNyuswa	599071	1.99	3,890	Zulu
KwaSondela	599074	7.15	7,660	Zulu
La Mercy	599016	27.73	2,779	English
Lower Molweni	599106	2.86	1,729	Zulu
Luganda	599157	2.7	6,165	Zulu
Luthele	599059	0.32	864	Zulu
Luthuli	599129	0.94	1,222	Zulu
Mabedlane A	599032	1.55	380	Zulu
Mabedlane B	599031	5.13	2,768	Zulu
Mabedlane C	599067	3.57	3,168	Zulu
Mabedlane D	599068	3.06	1,380	Zulu
Mabedlane E	599070	0.86	842	Zulu
Madudubala	599191	11.33	3,580	Zulu
Madundube	599169	57.93	13,731	Zulu
Madwaleni	599085	0.6	1,041	Zulu
Magabeni	599192	1.74	4,928	Zulu
Mahlabathini	599028	16.13	4,111	Zulu
Malagazi	599174	4.82	29,651	Zulu
Malukazi	599175	3.38	19,520	Zulu
Mandlakazi B	599130	0.55	399	Zulu
Maromeni	599042	1.09	1,774	Zulu
Matabetule	599038	22.27	13,247	Zulu
Mawothi	599035	15.2	75,050	Zulu
Mgandeni	599009	15.01	2,649	Zulu
Mgangeni	599027	36.88	17,108	Zulu
Mgezanyoni	599008	3.89	221	Zulu
Mkholombe	599076	3.32	2,072	Zulu
Mlahlanja	599022	7.45	1,192	Zulu
Mngcweni	599091	1.78	1,137	Zulu
Molweni	599061	1.04	4,580	Zulu
Molweni A	599065	0.55	1,302	Zulu
Molweni B	599043	1.68	247	Zulu
Molweni C	599103	1.06	1,009	Zulu
Molweni D	599107	0.45	70	Zulu
Mophela	599135	8.23	5,517	Zulu
Motalabad	599108	0.49	105	Zulu
Mount Edgecombe	599052	8.34	7,323	English
Mount Moreland	599017	0.85	241	English
Moya	599122	0.32	744	Zulu
Mpola A	599138	1.89	8,465	Zulu
Mpola B	599151	0.43	311	English
Mpuma	599084	2.01	4,100	Zulu
Mpumalanga	599123	21.66	62,406	Zulu
Mshazi	599029	7.08	3,873	Zulu
Mshazi Skhambane	599030	4.59	1,333	Zulu
Msunduzi	599046	3.62	6,058	Zulu
New Glasgow	599020	4.78	2,101	Zulu
Newlands East	599111	14.81	52,566	Zulu
Newlands West	599112	13.33	50,627	Zulu
Ngqungqulu	599062	0.45	678	Zulu
Nkangala	599060	0.76	1,806	Zulu
Nkomokazi	599168	22.42	596	Zulu
Nonoti	599045	1.16	1,839	Zulu
Nqobane	599153	4.77	1,758	Zulu
Ntongela	599080	1.81	1,137	Zulu
Ntshongweni A	599127	0.61	568	Zulu
Ntshongweni B	599144	3.41	132	English
Ntukuso	599048	3.81	3,446	Zulu
Ntuzuma	599056	17.82	125,394	Zulu
Nungwane	599181	34.29	7,518	Zulu
Ocean Drive-In	599018	0.21	1,085	Zulu
Olwambeni	599154	9.48	1,590	Zulu
Outer West Durban	599099	30.21	7,408	English
Palmcliffe	599197	0.8	264	English
Panekeni	599083	0.65	2,567	English
Phoenix	599051	30.16	176,989	English
Phola Mission	599039	2.98	7,320	Zulu
Pinetown	599116	8.15	144,026	Zulu
Qhodela	599024	32.23	2,127	Zulu
Queensburgh	599160	22.88	54,846	English
Redcliffe	599033	13.28	14,220	Zulu
Rietvallei	599090	0.63	1,568	Zulu
Roseneath	599193	2.96	3,730	Zulu
Salem	599143	0.39	781	Zulu
Sankontshe	599119	4.49	6,634	Zulu
Senzokuhle	599010	25.07	7,141	Zulu
Seventeen	599131	2.24	1,876	Zulu
Sgubudwini	599152	2.97	1,592	Zulu
Shongweni	599148	0.97	24	Zulu
Sithumba	599079	2.89	2,247	Zulu
Siweni	599047	4.44	3,868	Zulu
Siyanda	599110	1.02	13,393	Zulu
St. Lawrence	599072	2.48	2,081	Zulu
Thandaza	599121	0.74	3,398	Zulu
Thornwood	599150	0.33	1,608	Zulu
Thusumuntu	599075	3.89	1,255	Zulu
Tin Town	599104	0.28	882	Zulu
Tongaat	599002	11.72	42,554	English
Tongaat Beach	599014	0.72	722	English
Tshelimnyama	599137	4.14	20,689	Zulu
Umbhayi	599005	0.34	1,845	Xhosa
Umbumbulu	599170	23.72	2,684	Zulu
uMdloti	599049	1.59	1,778	English
Umgababa South	599171	6.23	10,814	Zulu
Umgagaba	599058	2.84	1,552	Zulu
Umgeni	599026	8.82	811	Zulu
uMhlanga	599053	16.75	24,238	English
Umkomaas	599196	6.14	2,716	English
Umlazi	599163	47.46	404,811	Zulu
Umngeni	599041	1.83	547	Zulu
Umnini	599189	25.47	17,416	Zulu
Uthweba	599094	4.07	3,351	Zulu
Verulam	599034	18.13	37,273	English
Vulindlala	599073	2.48	2,735	Zulu
Waterfall	599063	14.4	7,525	English
Wathanga	599132	1.71	2,983	Zulu
Westbrook	599012	1.58	1,526	English
Westville	599115	30.76	30,508	English
Ximba	599095	1.1	1,587	Zulu
Zwelibomvu	599145	20.88	8,887	Zulu

== Demographics ==
Geographical distribution of home languages in eThekwini: Afrikaans English / Xhosa Zulu; No language dominant

The following statistics are from the 2011 census.

Language	Population	%
isiZulu	2,140,294	62.82%
English	912,173	26.77%
isiXhosa	133,136	3.91%
Afrikaans	58,688	1.72%
Other	44,850	1.32%
isiNdebele	38,380	1.13%
Sesotho	30,878	0.91%
Setswana	17,358	0.51%
Sign Language	16,486	0.48%
Sepedi	6,671	0.20%
siSwati	2,651	0.08%
Xitsonga	3,773	0.11%
TshiVenda	1,737	0.05%

=== Gender ===
As of 2011.

Gender	Population	%
Female	1,759,955	51.13%
Male	1,682,406	48.87%

=== Ethnic group ===
As of 2022

Ethnic group	Population	%
Black African	3,030,590	71.60%
Indian/Asian	835,907	19.70%
White	252,332	6.00%
Coloured	104,369	2.50%
Other	11,531	0.30%

=== Age ===
Age	Population	%
0–4	327,972	9.53%
5–9	262,210	7.62%
10–14	269,763	7.84%
15–19	318,540	9.25%
20–24	412,727	11.99%
25–29	395,580	11.49%
30–34	299,167	8.69%
35–39	247,382	7.19%
40–44	199,167	5.79%
45–49	174,931	5.08%
50–54	145,723	4.23%
55–59	119,971	3.49%
60–64	97,500	2.83%
65–69	63,493	1.84%
70–74	44,832	1.30%
75–79	27,567	0.80%
80–84	17,028	0.49%
85–89	7,783	0.23%
90–94	2,867	0.08%
95–99	851	0.02%
over 100	972	0.03%

== Politics ==
The municipal council consists of 223 members elected by mixed-member proportional representation. 112 councillors are elected by first-past-the-post voting in 112 wards, while the remaining 111 are chosen from party lists so that the total number of party representatives is proportional to the number of votes received.

=== Election results ===
In the 2021 local government elections, the African National Congress lost their majority on the city council for the first time since the metro's establishment in 2000.

In the 2026 local government elections, no party won a majority, with the uMkhonto weSizwe Party gaining the most seats, eighty-six.

The following table shows the detailed results of the election.

Party	Ward			List			Total seats
Party	Votes	%	Seats	Votes	%	Seats	Total seats
uMkhonto weSizwe Party	386,929	38.34	73	386,507	38.26	13	86
Democratic Alliance	250,371	24.81	33	263,788	26.11	24	57
African National Congress	167,799	16.63	2	163,807	16.21	35	37
Inkatha Freedom Party	70,766	7.01	4	66,416	6.57	11	15
ActionSA	26,062	2.58	0	31,504	3.12	7	7
Economic Freedom Fighters	16,729	1.66	0	15,891	1.57	4	4
Freedom Front Plus	8,517	0.84	0	8,781	0.87	2	2
African Transformation Movement	8,085	0.80	0	7,935	0.79	2	2
Ethekwini Ratepayers Political Movement	7,258	0.72	0	5,158	0.51	2	2
Patriotic Alliance	4,776	0.47	0	4,450	0.44	1	1
South African Communist Party	4,348	0.43	0	3,661	0.36	1	1
African Christian Democratic Party	3,624	0.36	0	4,240	0.42	1	1
Minority Front	4,092	0.41	0	3,534	0.35	1	1
Al Jama-ah	3,951	0.39	0	3,546	0.35	1	1
1860NIC Congress	3,604	0.36	0	3,071	0.30	1	1
Democratic Liberal Congress	3,641	0.36	0	2,435	0.24	1	1
African Independent Congress	2,737	0.27	0	2,634	0.26	1	1
Independent People's Party	1,959	0.19	0	2,433	0.24	1	1
Independent candidates	4,334	0.43	0				0
People's Revolutionary Movement	1,886	0.19	0	1,553	0.15	1	1
People's Freedom Party	1,648	0.16	0	1,435	0.14	1	1
51 other parties	26,118	2.59	0	27,446	2.72	0	0
Total	1,009,234	100.00	112	1,010,225	100.00	111	223
Valid votes	1,009,234	98.04		1,010,225	98.03		
Invalid/blank votes	20,206	1.96		20,320	1.97		
Total votes	1,029,440	100.00		1,030,545	100.00		
Registered voters/turnout	2,032,565	50.65		2,032,565	50.70		

== See also ==
- Municipal Demarcation Board
- Mayor of eThekwini
