= Krantzkloof Nature Reserve =

Nature reserve in Kloof, KwaZulu-Natal

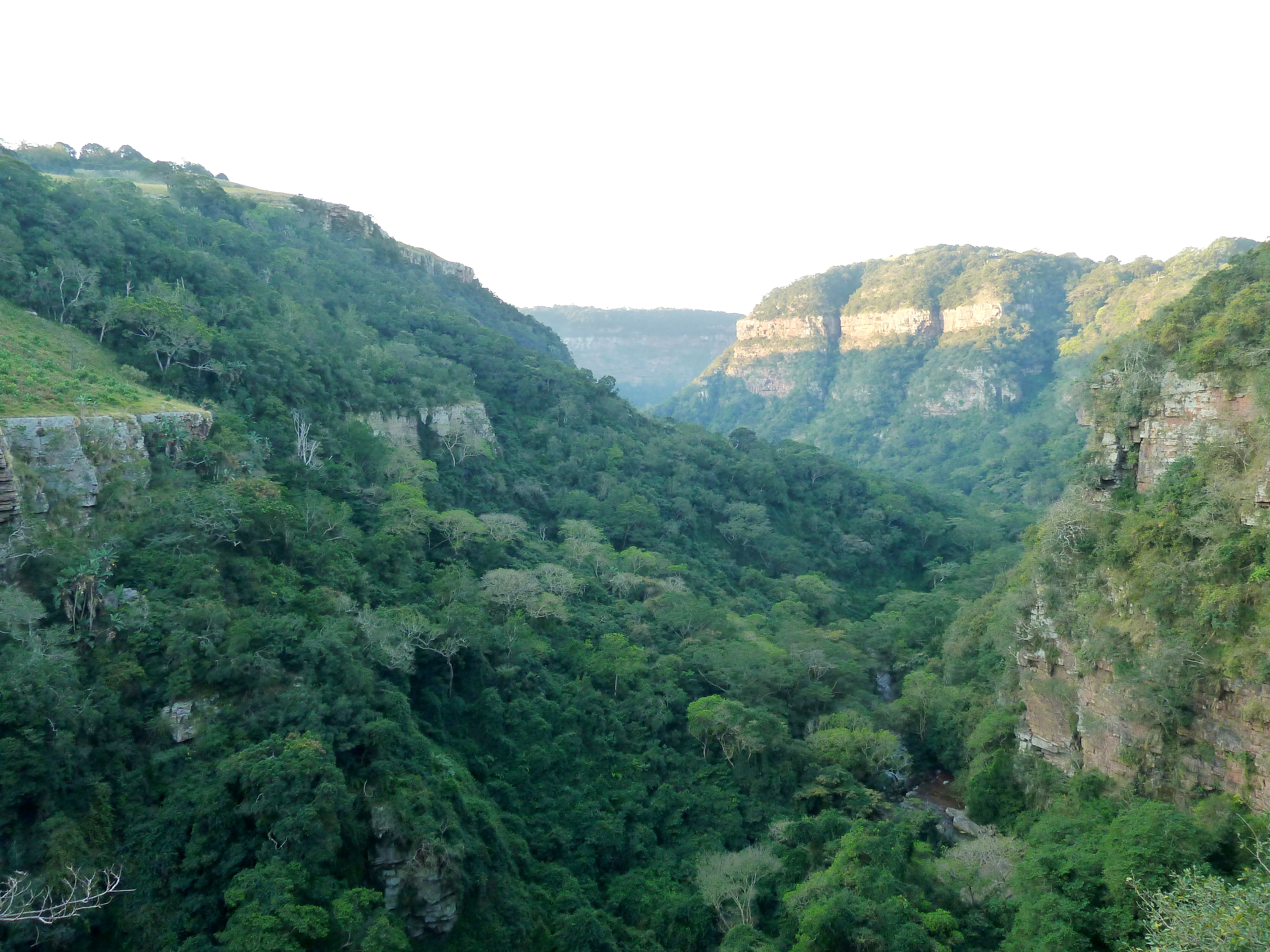
- The upper Molweni gorge

- Location within KwaZulu-Natal
- Location: KwaZulu-Natal, South Africa
- Nearest city: Pinetown
- Coordinates: 29°45′51″S 30°51′03″E
- Established: 1950 by Natal Parks Board

The Krantzkloof Nature Reserve, managed by Ezemvelo KZN Wildlife, conserves 668 ha of the Molweni (Zulu: 'mutual greetings') and Nkutu River gorges that incise the sandstone Kloof plateau in KwaZulu-Natal, South Africa. The reserve conserves coastal scarp forest, sourveld grassland, a cliff face biotope, and aquatic environments along its rivers. Scarp forest is a threatened forest type, protected by South Africa's forests act of 1998, while the grassland is classified as KwaZulu-Natal sandstone sourveld, the most threatened terrestrial habitat in the Durban metropole. The reserve was established in 1950 and was augmented by land donations as late as 1999.

== Setting ==
The reserve is situated at 140 to 520 m.a.s.l, and borders on suburbs, informal settlements, and in some of the catchment areas, on privately owned conservancies. The Kloof conservancy manages the Ronald's Kloof stream project, which effectively adds 5 ha to the reserve. The Springside and Iphithi Nature Reserves, in addition to the Everton conservancy and Overock community reserve, conserve natural remnants of the Nkutu, Molweni and Iphithi rivers' upper catchment.

The forested Molweni gorge divides the residential suburbs of Kloof and Forest Hills, and is intersected by Kloof Falls Road. This road provides access to the main Kloof Falls picnic site, from where walking trails diverge in both the upstream and downstream directions. The Molweni and Nkutu rivers converge to join 1 km outside the reserve, and some 2 km from the Umgeni. The reserve and conservancies are included in Durban's open space system, D’MOSS.

The reserve is situated on Natal group sandstone of the Cambrian to Ordovician periods, some 490 million years old, and artifacts recovered from its rock shelters indicate that it was once inhabited by early Iron Age people.

== Wildlife ==
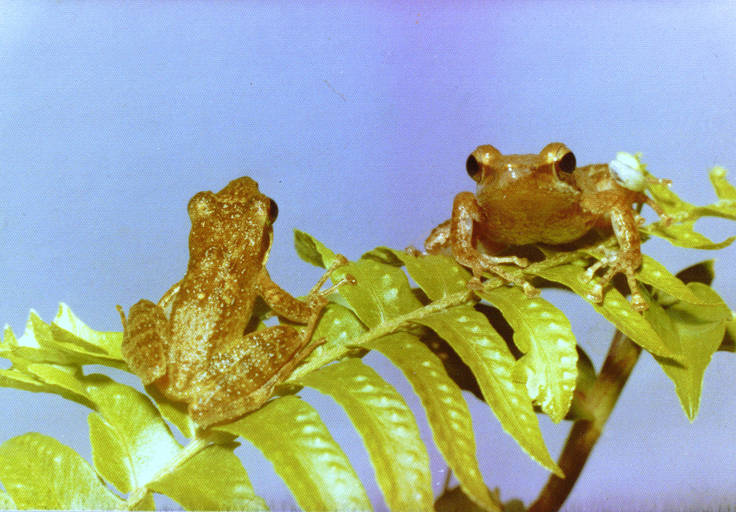
The Kloof frog is an endangered amphibian, confined to clear streams in scarp forests.

Some 25 amphibian, 255 bird, 50 mammal, 36 reptile, 150 butterfly and 274 tree species have been recorded in the Gorge or its vicinity. The natural vegetation is under pressure from numerous invasive species, while some tree species are vulnerable to muti-collecting practices in the greater Durban area.

=== Mammals ===
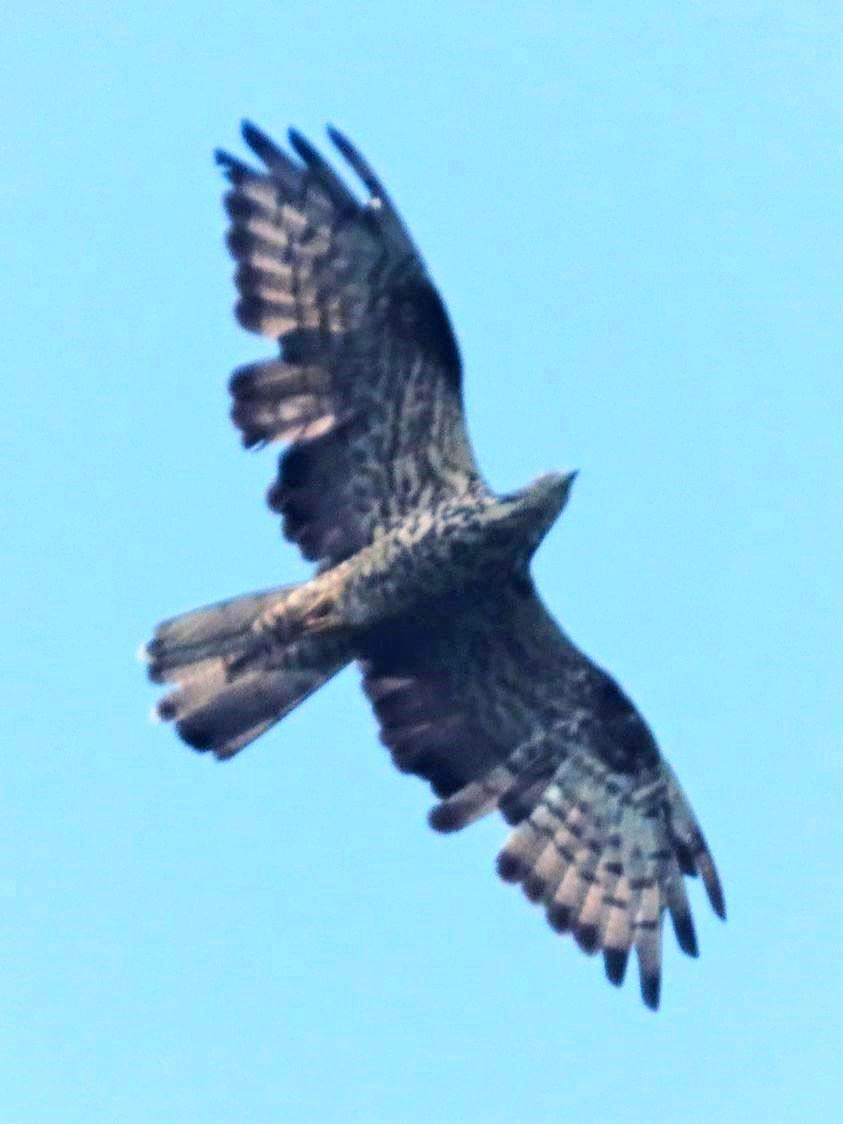
A moulting adult honey buzzard soaring over the reserve

Blue duiker and bushbuck were released into the reserve in 1970 and 1971. Red duiker, then regionally extinct, was also introduced but did not persist, while the introduced baboons had to be eradicated after causing a nuisance to nearby residents. Common duiker occurs and the last brown greater galagos of the Durban metropole are resident. Small carnivores include water, slender, white-tailed, Egyptian and banded mongoose, Cape genet, caracal and water monitor. Its rocky grassland areas offer protection to the Natal red rock hare, a species with declining numbers.

=== Birds ===
Some 255 bird species have been recorded in the reserve. The three pairs of crowned eagles that nest in the reserve prey on dassies, monkeys and hadeda ibis. Wahlberg's eagle, lanner and peregrine falcons all nest in the lower gorge. Secretive birds like broadbill, grey cuckooshrike, Narina trogon, emerald cuckoo and wood-owl all occur, but are more likely to be heard than seen. Winter migrants include chorister robin-chat, white-starred robin, yellow-throated warbler and the rare spotted ground-thrush. Trumpeter and crowned hornbills are numerous and conspicuous. Knysna turaco (subsp. corythaix) is not found elsewhere in the Durban metropole, and occurs alongside the more numerous purple-crested turaco. Late summer seed of broad-leaved setaria attract green twinspot, grey waxbill, swee waxbill and red-backed mannikin. Plain-backed pipit is regularly present after grassland burns, while bat hawk has been noted at dusk.

Bird species of Krantzkloof Nature Reserve
Common name	Scientific name	Status	Breeding
Little grebe	Tachybaptus ruficollis	vagrant	
Reed cormorant	Phalacrocorax africanus	vagrant	
Grey heron	Ardea cinerea	vagrant	
Purple heron	Ardea purpurea	vagrant	
Hamerkop	Scopus umbretta	rare	
Woolly-necked stork	Ciconia episcopus	vagrant	
Hadeda ibis	Bostrychia hagedash	abundant	breeder
Spur-winged goose	Plectropterus gambensis	vagrant	
Egyptian goose	Alopochen aegyptiacus	uncommon	
African black duck	Anas sparsa	rare	
Yellow-billed duck	Anas undulata	rare	
Southern pochard	Netta erythrophthalma	vagrant	
Peregrine falcon	Falco peregrinus	vagrant	
Lanner falcon	Falco biarmicus	rare	
Rock kestrel	Falco rupicolus	vagrant	
African cuckoo hawk	Aviceda cuculoides	vagrant	
European honey buzzard	Pernis apivorus	vagrant	
Black kite	Milvus migrans	vagrant	
Yellow-billed kite	Milvus aegyptius	regular	breeder
Black-winged kite	Elanus caeruleus	vagrant	
Bat hawk	Macheiramphus alcinus	vagrant	
Wahlberg's eagle	Aquila wahlbergi	rare	breeder
Booted eagle	Aquila pennatus	vagrant	
Martial eagle	Polemaetus bellicosus	vagrant	
African crowned eagle	Stephanoaetus coronatus	common	breeder
African fish-eagle	Haliaeetus vocifer	vagrant	
Jackal buzzard	Buteo rufofuscus	vagrant	
Steppe buzzard	Buteo vulpinus	rare	
Little sparrowhawk	Accipiter minullus	rare	
Black sparrowhawk	Accipiter melanoleucus	rare	
African goshawk	Accipiter tachiro	uncommon	
African harrier-hawk	Polyboroides typus	rare	
Natal spurfowl	Pternistis natalensis	rare	
Common quail	Coturnix coturnix	vagrant	
Helmeted guineafowl	Numida meleagris	vagrant	
Speckled pigeon	Columba guinea	vagrant	
African olive-pigeon	Columba arquatrix	rare	
Red-eyed dove	Streptopelia semitorquata	common	
Laughing dove	Streptopelia senegalensis	vagrant	
Tambourine dove	Turtur tympanistria	regular	
Lemon dove	Aplopelia larvata	uncommon	
Rock dove	Columba livia	vagrant	
Purple-crested turaco	Gallirex porphyreolophus	common	
Knysna turaco	Tauraco corythaix	vagrant	
Common cuckoo	Cuculus canorus	vagrant	
Red-chested cuckoo	Cuculus solitarius	rare	breeder
Black cuckoo	Cuculus clamosus	rare	
Jacobin cuckoo	Clamator jacobinus	vagrant	
African emerald cuckoo	Chrysococcyx cupreus	rare	
Klaas's cuckoo	Chrysococcyx klaas	rare	
Diderick cuckoo	Chrysococcyx caprius	vagrant	
African wood-owl	Strix woodfordii	vagrant	
African black swift	Apus barbatus	rare	
White-rumped swift	Apus caffer	rare	
Little swift	Apus affinis	rare	
Alpine swift	Tachymarptis melba	rare	
African palm-swift	Cypsiurus parvus	rare	
Speckled mousebird	Colius striatus	rare	
Narina trogon	Apaloderma narina	regular	breeder
Giant kingfisher	Megaceryle maximus	rare	
Malachite kingfisher	Alcedo cristata	vagrant	
African pygmy kingfisher	Ispidina picta	vagrant	
Brown-hooded kingfisher	Halcyon albiventris	regular	
African hoopoe	Upupa africana	vagrant	
Green wood-hoopoe	Phoeniculus purpureus	regular	
Trumpeter hornbill	Bycanistes bucinator	common	breeder
Crowned hornbill	Tockus alboterminatus	regular	
Black-collared barbet	Lybius torquatus	abundant	
Red-fronted tinkerbird	Pogoniulus pusillus	regular	
Yellow-rumped tinkerbird	Pogoniulus bilineatus	common	
Crested barbet	Trachyphonus vaillantii	vagrant	
Scaly-throated honeyguide	Indicator variegatus	uncommon	
Lesser honeyguide	Indicator minor	rare	
Brown-backed honeybird	Prodotiscus regulus	vagrant	
Golden-tailed woodpecker	Campethera abingoni	common	
Cardinal woodpecker	Dendropicos fuscescens	rare	
Olive woodpecker	Dendropicos griseocephalus	uncommon	
African broadbill	Smithornis capensis	rare	
Rufous-naped lark	Mirafra africana	rare	
Barn swallow	Hirundo rustica	rare	
Lesser striped swallow	Hirundo abyssinica	uncommon	
Rock martin	Hirundo fuligula	uncommon	
Common house-martin	Delichon urbicum	vagrant	
Black saw-wing	Psalidoprocne holomelaena	rare	
Black cuckooshrike	Campephaga flava	uncommon	
Grey cuckooshrike	Coracina caesia	uncommon	
Fork-tailed drongo	Dicrurus adsimilis	abundant	
Common square-tailed drongo	Dicrurus ludwigii	common	
Black-headed oriole	Oriolus larvatus	common	
Pied crow	Corvus albus	uncommon	
White-necked raven	Corvus albicollis	uncommon	
Southern black tit	Parus niger	common	
Dark-capped bulbul	Pycnonotus tricolor	abundant	breeder
Terrestrial brownbul	Phyllastrephus terrestris	common	
Yellow-bellied greenbul	Chlorocichla flaviventris	rare	
Sombre greenbul	Andropadus importunus	abundant	
Kurrichane thrush	Turdus libonyanus	vagrant	
Olive thrush	Turdus olivaceus	vagrant	
Spotted ground-thrush	Zoothera guttata	vagrant	
Cape rock-thrush	Monticola rupestris	rare	breeder
Mocking cliff-chat	Thamnolaea cinnamomeiventris	rare	
African stonechat	Saxicola torquatus	vagrant	
Chorister robin-chat	Cossypha dichroa	vagrant	
Red-capped robin-chat	Cossypha natalensis	regular	
Cape robin-chat	Cossypha caffra	vagrant	
Brown scrub-robin	Cercotrichas signata	vagrant	
White-browed scrub-robin	Cercotrichas leucophrys	rare	
White-starred robin	Pogonocichla stellata	rare	
Garden warbler	Sylvia borin	vagrant	
Barratt's warbler	Bradypterus barratti	vagrant	
Cape grassbird	Sphenoeacus afer	vagrant	
Long-billed crombec	Sylvietta rufescens	vagrant	
Bar-throated apalis	Apalis thoracica	common	
Yellow-breasted apalis	Apalis flavida	rare	
Green-backed camaroptera	Camaroptera brachyura	rare	
Zitting cisticola	Cisticola juncidis	vagrant	
Neddicky	Cisticola fulvicapilla	uncommon	
Rattling cisticola	Cisticola chiniana	vagrant	
Croaking cisticola	Cisticola natalensis	rare	
Lazy cisticola	Cisticola aberrans	rare	
Tawny-flanked prinia	Prinia subflava	regular	
African dusky flycatcher	Muscicapa adusta	common	
Ashy flycatcher	Muscicapa caerulescens	regular	
Southern black flycatcher	Melaenornis pammelaina	regular	
Fiscal flycatcher	Sigelus silens	vagrant	
Yellow-throated woodland-warbler	Phylloscopus ruficapilla	uncommon	
Cape batis	Batis capensis	abundant	breeder
Chinspot batis	Batis molitor	rare	breeder
Blue-mantled crested-flycatcher	Trochocercus cyanomelas	rare	
African paradise-flycatcher	Terpsiphone viridis	regular	
African pied wagtail	Motacilla aguimp	vagrant	
Cape wagtail	Motacilla capensis	vagrant	
Mountain wagtail	Motacilla clara	common	
African pipit	Anthus cinnamomeus	vagrant	
Striped pipit	Anthus lineiventris	rare	
Plain-backed pipit	Anthus leucophrys	rare	
Yellow-throated longclaw	Macronyx croceus	rare	
Common fiscal	Lanius collaris	rare	
Southern boubou	Laniarius ferrugineus	regular	
Black-backed puffback	Dryoscopus cubla	common	
Southern tchagra	Tchagra tchagra	vagrant	
Black-crowned tchagra	Tchagra senegalus	vagrant	
Orange-breasted bush-shrike	Telophorus sulfureopectus	rare	
Gorgeous bush-shrike	Telophorus viridis	vagrant	
Grey-headed bush-shrike	Malaconotus blanchoti	rare	breeder
Common myna	Acridotheres tristis	vagrant	
Violet-backed starling	Cinnyricinclus leucogaster	vagrant	
Cape glossy starling	Lamprotornis nitens	rare	
Black-bellied starling	Lamprotornis corruscus	regular	
Red-winged starling	Onychognathus morio	abundant	breeder
Greater double-collared sunbird	Cinnyris afer	vagrant	
White-bellied sunbird	Cinnyris talatala	uncommon	
Grey sunbird	Cyanomitra veroxii	uncommon	
Olive sunbird	Cyanomitra olivacea	abundant	
Collared sunbird	Hedydipna collaris	abundant	
Amethyst sunbird	Chalcomitra amethystina	common	breeder
Cape white-eye	Zosterops virens	vagrant	
Yellow-throated petronia	Petronia superciliaris	vagrant	
Dark-backed weaver	Ploceus bicolor	abundant	breeder
Spectacled weaver	Ploceus ocularis	rare	breeder
Village weaver	Ploceus cucullatus	uncommon	breeder
Thick-billed weaver	Amblyospiza albifrons	rare	
Red-collared widowbird	Euplectes ardens	rare	breeder
Bronze mannikin	Spermestes cucullatus	regular	breeder
Red-backed mannikin	Spermestes bicolor	regular	breeder
Swee waxbill	Coccopygia melanotis	vagrant	
Green twinspot	Mandingoa nitidula	regular	breeder
African firefinch	Lagonosticta rubricata	uncommon	
Blue waxbill	Uraeginthus angolensis	vagrant	
Grey waxbill	Estrilda perreini	vagrant	
Common waxbill	Estrilda astrild	vagrant	
Pin-tailed whydah	Vidua macroura	rare	
Cape canary	Serinus canicollis	vagrant	
Forest canary	Crithagra scotops	vagrant	
Yellow-fronted canary	Crithagra mozambicus	regular	breeder
Brimstone canary	Crithagra sulphuratus	vagrant	
Streaky-headed seedeater	Crithagra gularis	rare	
Golden-breasted bunting	Emberiza flaviventris	vagrant	

=== Invertebrates ===
The endangered ruby-footed black millipede, Doratogonus rubipodus, first collected in 1996, is only known from Krantzkloof and the nearby Giba gorge.

=== Plants ===
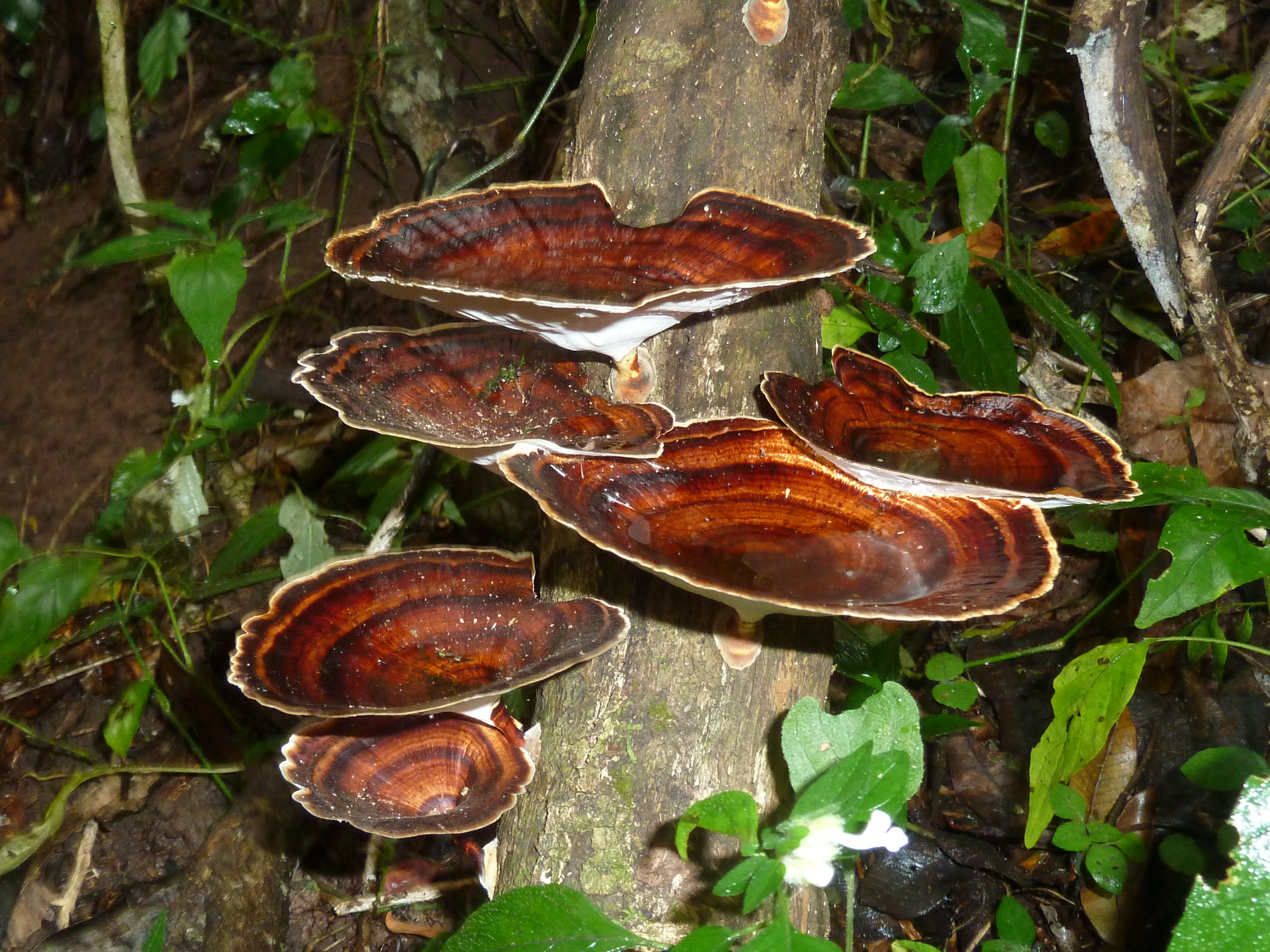
Yellow-footed polypore on the red trail

The reserve is home to a high diversity of plants including various rare species. These include cycads of the Encephalartos and Stangeria genera. The E. natalensis cycads of Krantzkloof represent one of several distinguishable varieties. A few specimens of the very rare Natal sandstone quince, Dahlgrenodendron natalense, are present. A relict population of Brachystelma natalense is conserved here, besides the only South African population of the red sunbird bush, Metarungia pubinervia. The vulnerable aquatic plant Hydrostachys polymorpha is found on one of the Molweni's waterfalls, while the Bootlace lily, Drimia flagellaris, discovered in 2005, is endemic to the reserve's cliff faces. The distinctive subspecies floribunda of Crassula multicava is endemic to scarp forest and gorge bottoms of this area. It is home to several species of African violet of the genus Streptocarpus, and includes the core range of the nominate subspecies of S. molweniensis, a vulnerable and declining species only described in 1996. Besides the latter, S. haygarthii, S. grandis, S. prolixus and the nominate subspecies of S. polyanthus are also to be found.

== Facilities and access ==
The reserve does not offer any accommodation or camping, but the Kranztkloof Conference Centre alongside Kloof Falls road is available for hire for meetings, conferences or social events of up to 70 people. The Kloof Falls picnic site is open daily from sunrise to sunset at a fee of R70 per person, or R35 per child under 12 years (Jul 2025). Rhino card holders have free access, but SanParks Wild Cards are expressly not accepted. The Valley Drive picnic site is currently remains closed (Aug 2025) for management reasons. Pets are not allowed in the reserve. The Krantzkloof Honorary Officers assist with fund raising towards various projects within the Reserve. Selected areas of the gorge are accessible to rock climbers only, with the requirement that they sign a climbing register and pay the entrance fee when entering and leaving.

== Walking trails ==
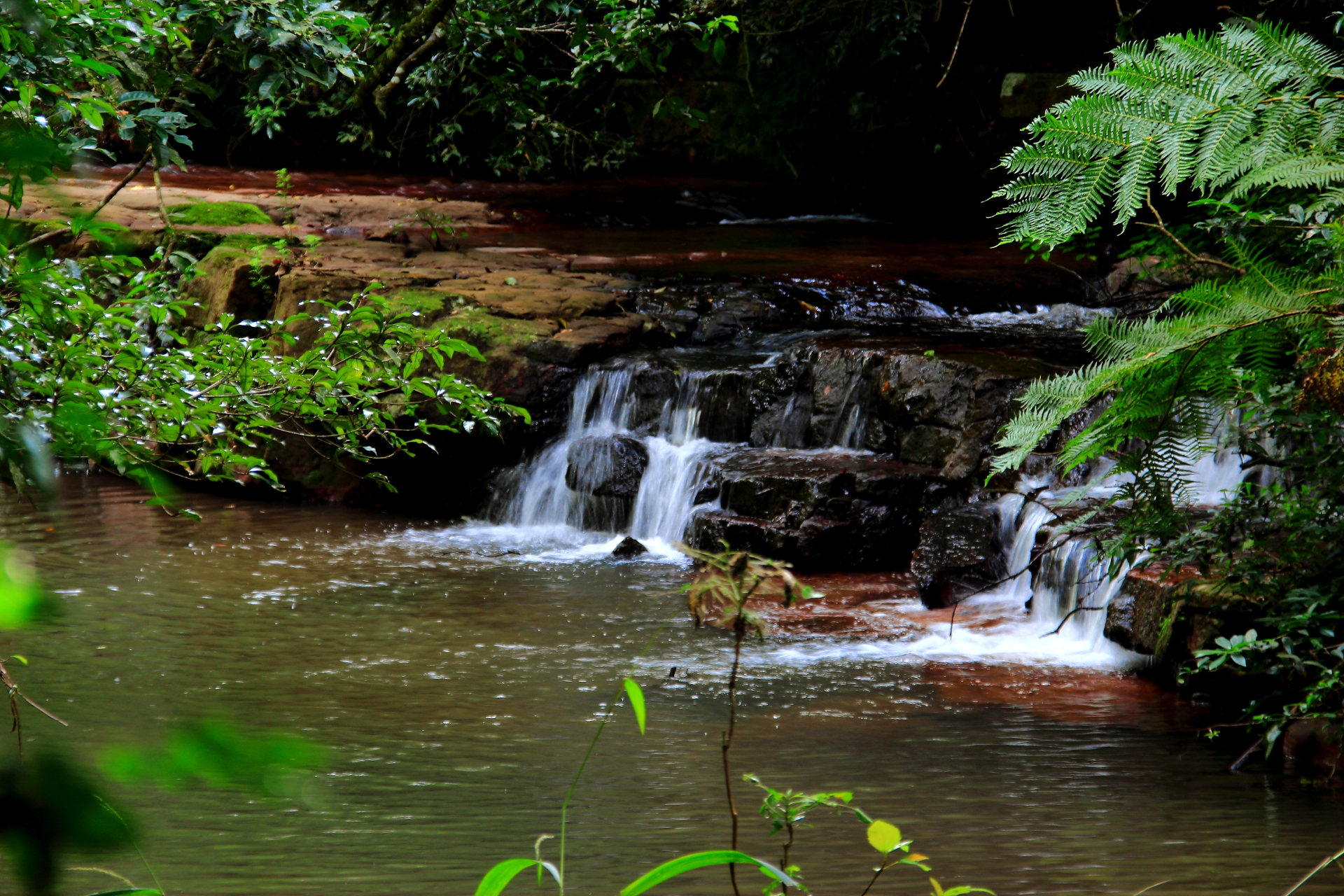
A small cascade in the nKonka River, a tributary of the Molweni which is intersected by the white trail

Exploration of the reserve is facilitated by numerous walking trails, more than 20 km in aggregate. They are designated as the red (Nkutu Falls, 1.25 hrs), yellow (Molweni, 4.5 hrs), green (Ntombeni, 1 hr), blue (Longshadows, 1.5 hrs), orange (Beacon, 1 hr), black (Mpiti, 45 min) and white (2 hrs) trails. A digital trail map can be downloaded from their website..

The Nkutu Falls trail allows a hiker to reach the base of the Nkutu Falls and return to the Nkutu picnic site in 30 minutes. The strenuous Molweni trail descends some 350 meters to the bottom of the gorge, and allows a visitor to reach the bottom of the 90m high Kloof Falls before retracing. The Ntombeni trail passes through level grassland to arrive at a site called "The Crack" that allows vistas of the lower gorge. The Longshadows trail follows the Molweni river upstream in cool, level forest. The Beacon trail diverges from the Molweni trail to take the hiker along level grassland above the cliff faces. The white trail winds up a steep slope, crosses Bridle Road to re-enter the reserve, and traces the escarpment edge before descending to the waterfall in the nKonka river.

Though incidents are rare, visitors have been advised that remote trails are unsafe due to uneven terrain, former crime incidents, or the possibility of getting lost.

== Site locations ==
- Bridle Road view site 29°46′13″S 30°50′08″E - closed for management reasons
- Kloof Falls (Main) picnic site 29°46′21″S 30°49′50″E
- mPhiti waterfall 29°46′15″S 30°49′27″E
- nKonka waterfall 29°45′36″S 30°50′04″E
- Nkutu (Valley Drive) picnic site 29°44′49″S 30°50′55″E - - closed for management reasons
- Rumdoodle crevasse (climbing site) 29°45′57″S 30°51′47″E
- Uve Road parking area 29°46′14″S 30°51′10″E - closed for management reasons
