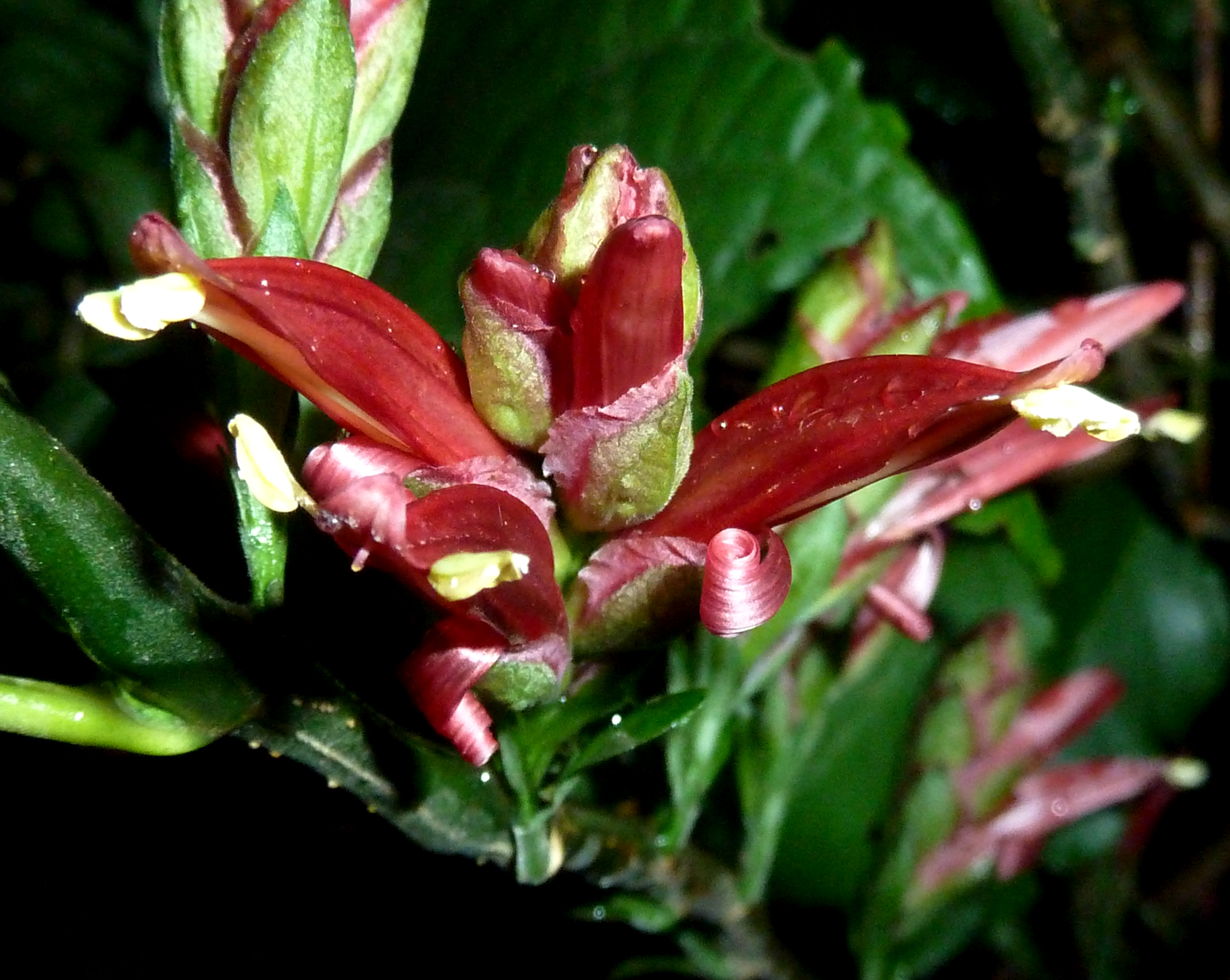
- Flowers

Scientific classification
- Kingdom: Plantae
- Clade: Tracheophytes
- Clade: Angiosperms
- Clade: Eudicots
- Clade: Asterids
- Order: Lamiales
- Family: Acanthaceae
- Genus: Anisotes
- Species: A. pubinervius

Binomial name
- Anisotes pubinervius (T.Anderson) Heine (1966)

Synonyms
- Diapedium pubinervium (T.Anderson) Kuntze (1891); Himantochilus marginatus Lindau (1894); Himantochilus pubinervius (T.Anderson) Lindau (1895); Macrorungia pubinervia (T.Anderson) C.B.Clarke (1900); Metarungia pubinervia T.Anderson ex Baden (1984); Rungia pubinervia T.Anderson (1863)

= Anisotes pubinervius =

Red sunbird-bush

African shrub

Anisotes pubinervius is an Afrotropical plant species in the acanthus family, which is native to forest understorey in the Afromontane archipelago. It is widespread in eastern Africa, with isolated populations in southern Africa and Nigeria. The species is named for the fine down (pubi -) that covers the main leaf veins (-nervia).

== Habit and habitat ==
It often has a colonial ecology, growing to relatively large shrubs of some 4 to 5 metres tall in full understorey shade. It is native to riparian or middle to low altitude evergreen forests, in warm and humid climes.

== Description ==
The pale brownish bark is covered with lenticels. The opposite and narrowly elliptic leaves are around 20 cm long, with pubescent veins and entire margins. The two-lipped flowers emerge from the reddish-fringed, green bracts on axillary spikes along the upper sides of branches. It flowers during the drier season, November to December in Nigeria, and June to July in South Africa, though probably all-year at more tropical or subtropical latitudes. The beaked and oblong woody fruit are c.18 mm long.

== Reproduction ==
The large, dark pink to maroon corollas attract forest sunbirds as pollinators, including Southern double-collared, Collared, Grey and Olive sunbirds. Reproduction occurs in various ways. Seed is produced for a month or so after flowering, producing seedlings that are ready to benefit from rains at the start of the wet season. Suckers develop where plants are damaged, to form new plants. Where stems touch the soil, they may also root to establish new plants.

== Range ==
In South Africa it is known since April 2000 to occur in Krantzkloof Nature Reserve, KwaZulu-Natal, but is also cultivated in gardens. In Nigeria it is known since November 2002 to occur in the 8 km^{2} Leinde Fadale forest, situated at 1,600 to 1,670 metres in the uplands adjacent to Gashaka Gumti National Park. It is besides native to montane Southern Sudan and southwestern Ethiopia, the mountain chains of Kenya, Tanzania, Mozambique and Zimbabwe (up to 2,000 metres) and the Albertine Rift of Uganda, Burundi, DRC and Zambia (1,000 to 1,200 m.a.s.l). No intraspecific variation is evident.

== Status ==
Though habitat degradation occurs locally, the species as a whole is not threatened.
