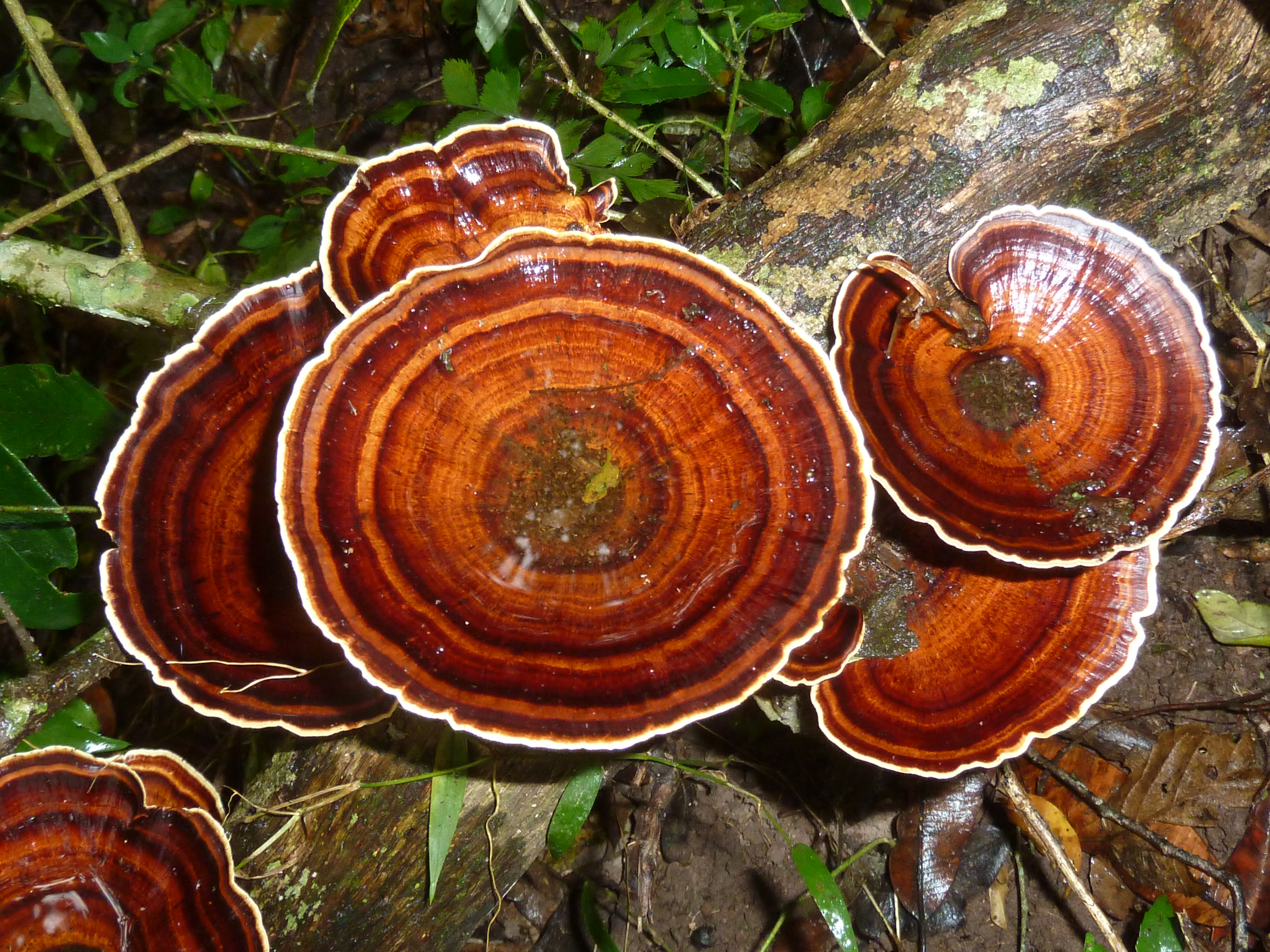
- M. xanthopus at Krantzkloof Nature Reserve in South Africa

Scientific classification
- Domain: Eukaryota
- Kingdom: Fungi
- Division: Basidiomycota
- Class: Agaricomycetes
- Order: Polyporales
- Family: Polyporaceae
- Genus: Microporus
- Species: M. xanthopus

Binomial name
- Microporus xanthopus (Fr.) Kuntze

= Microporus xanthopus =

Yellow-footed polypore

Species of fungus

Microporus xanthopus is a species of fungus in the genus Microporus. It is an inedible wood-decaying mushroom native to tropical areas.

== Gallery ==
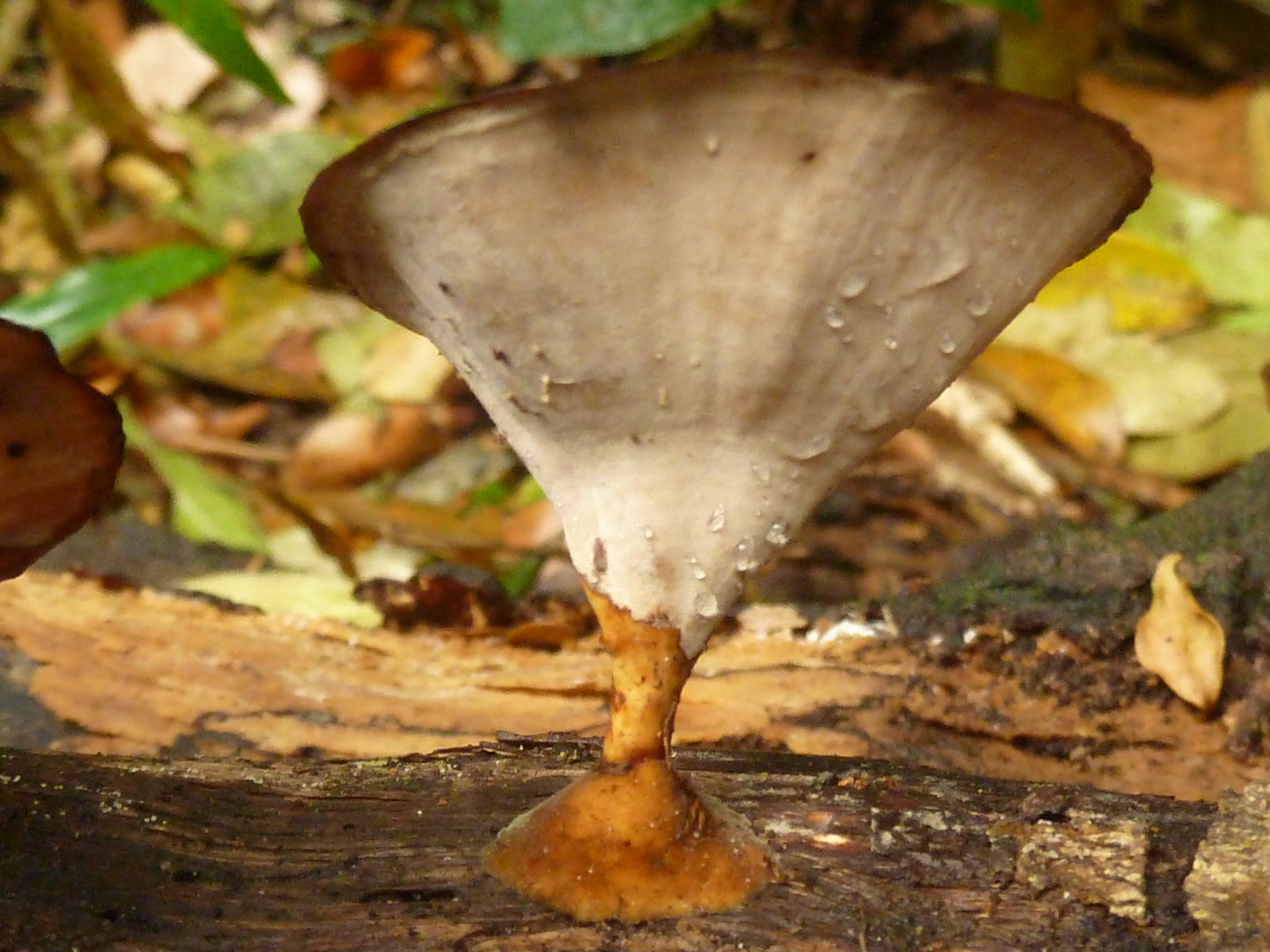
Yellow foot of fruiting body

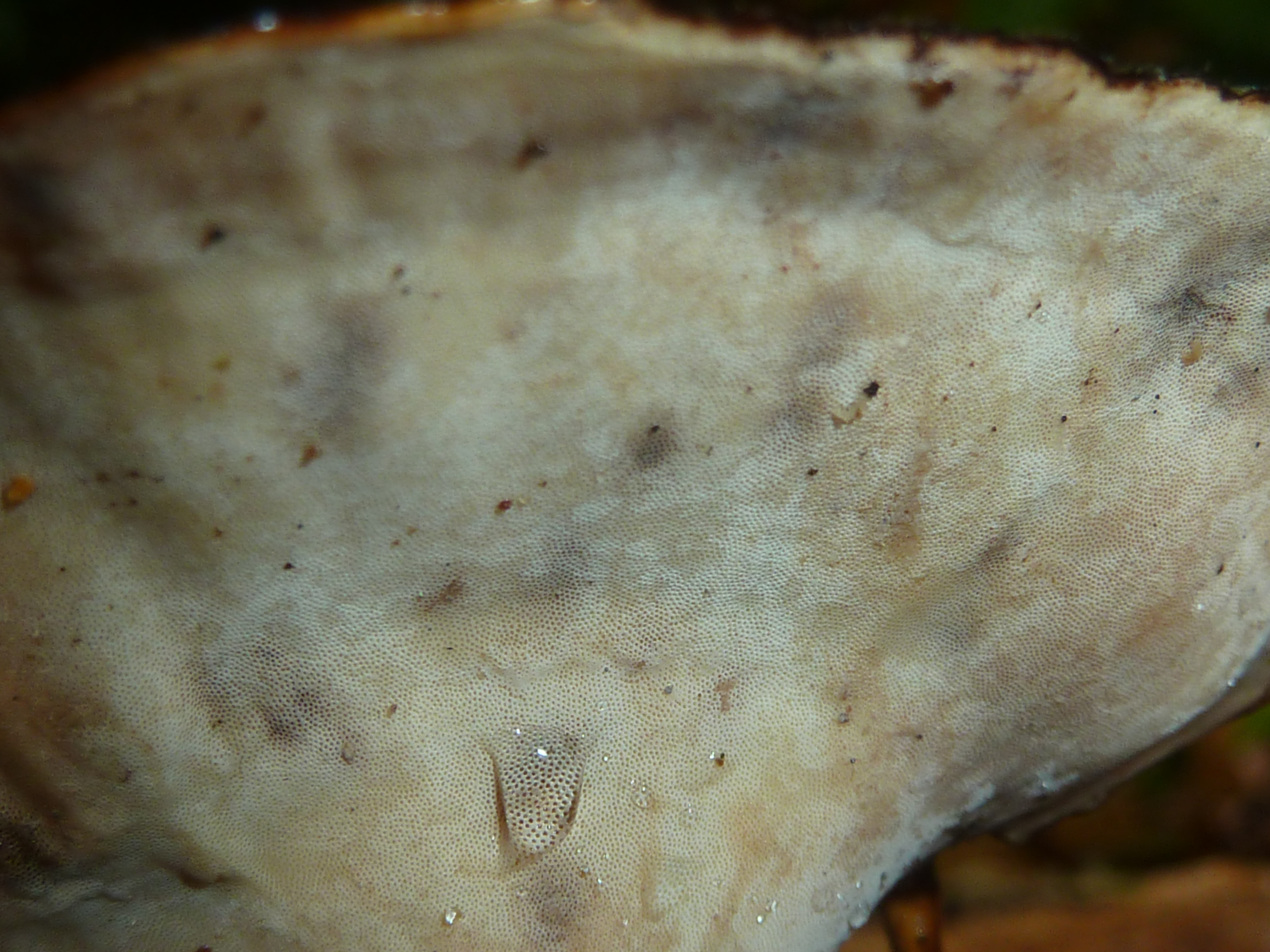
Pores magnified by droplet

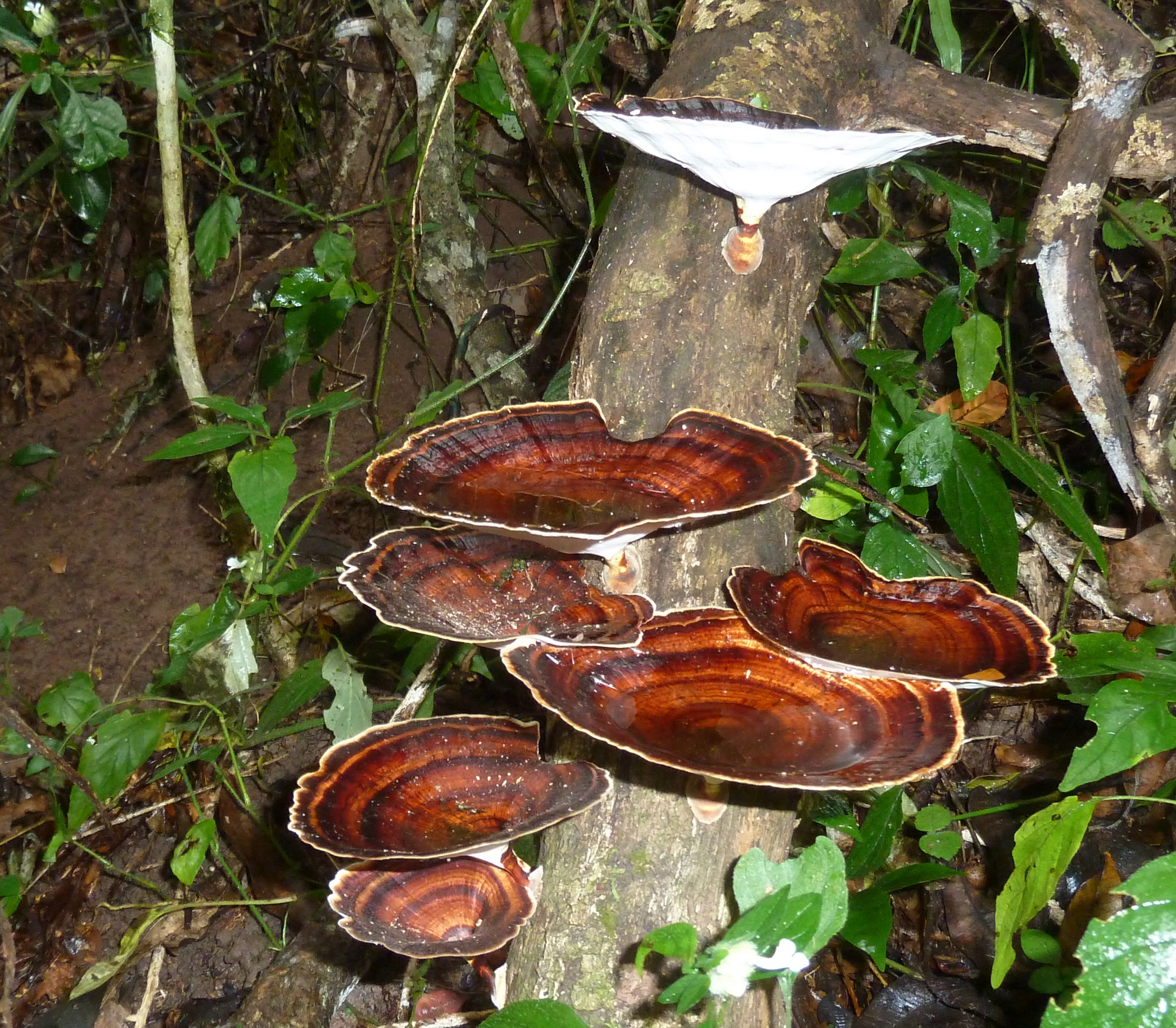
Lateral view of fruiting bodies

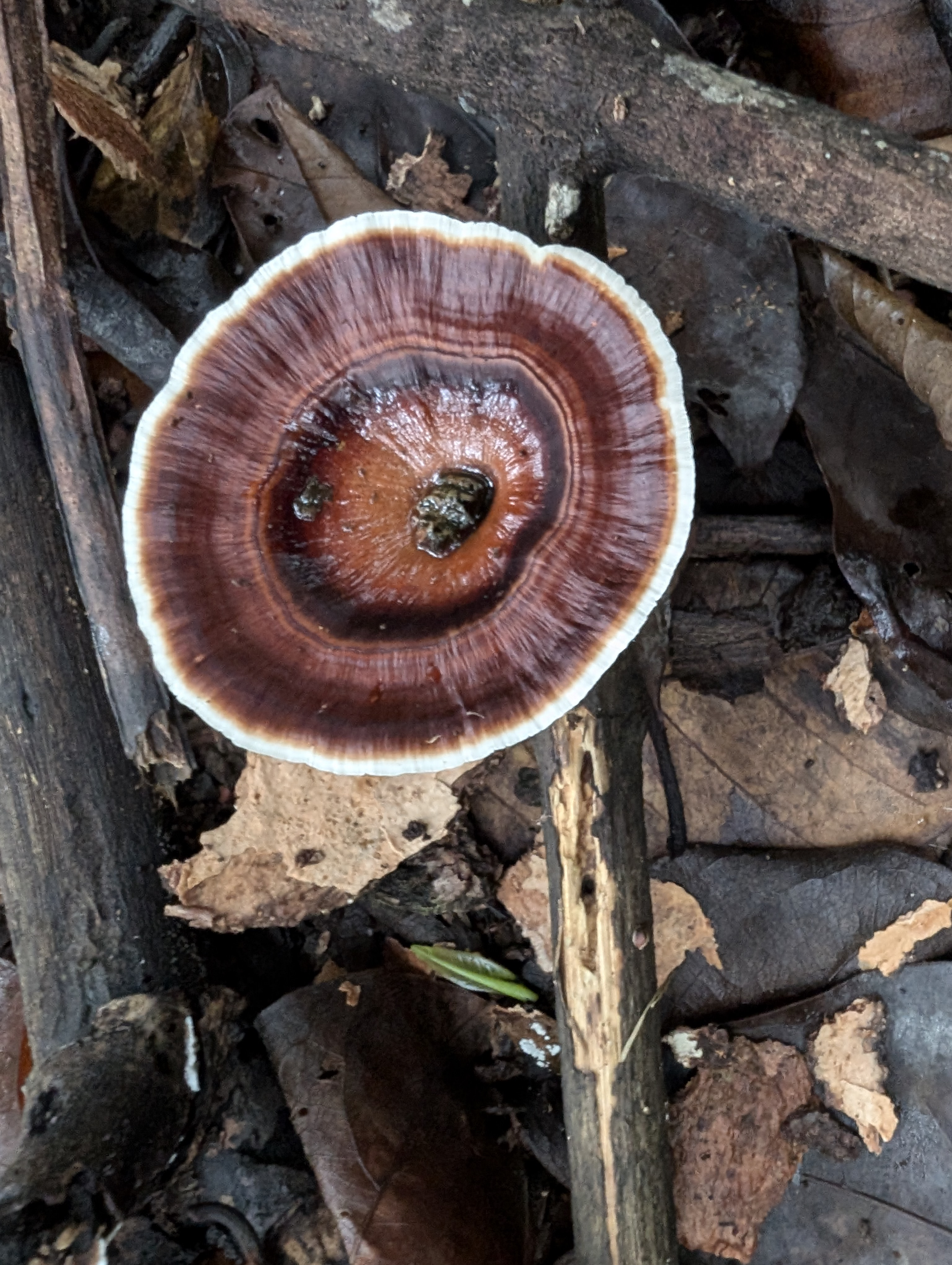

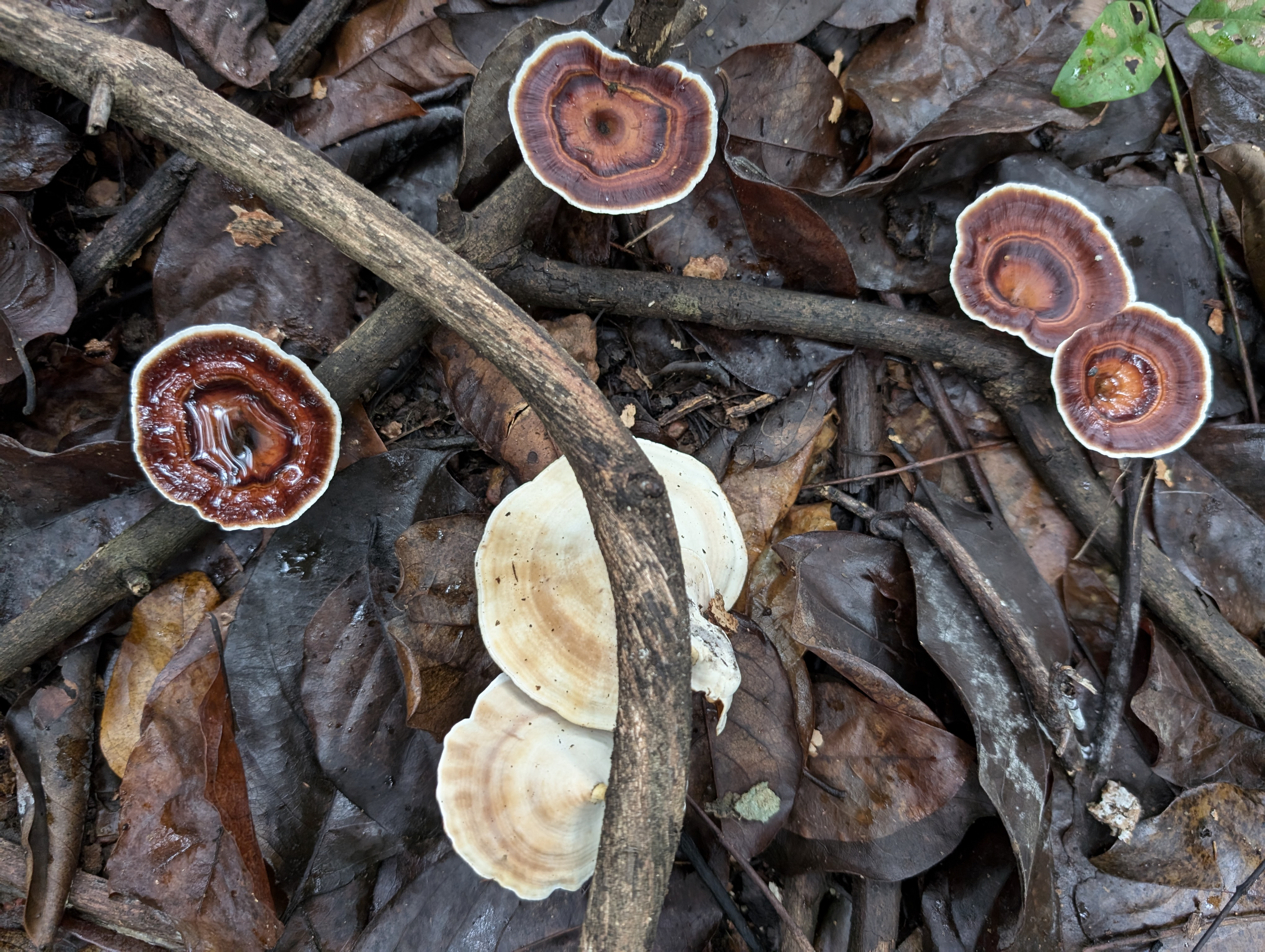

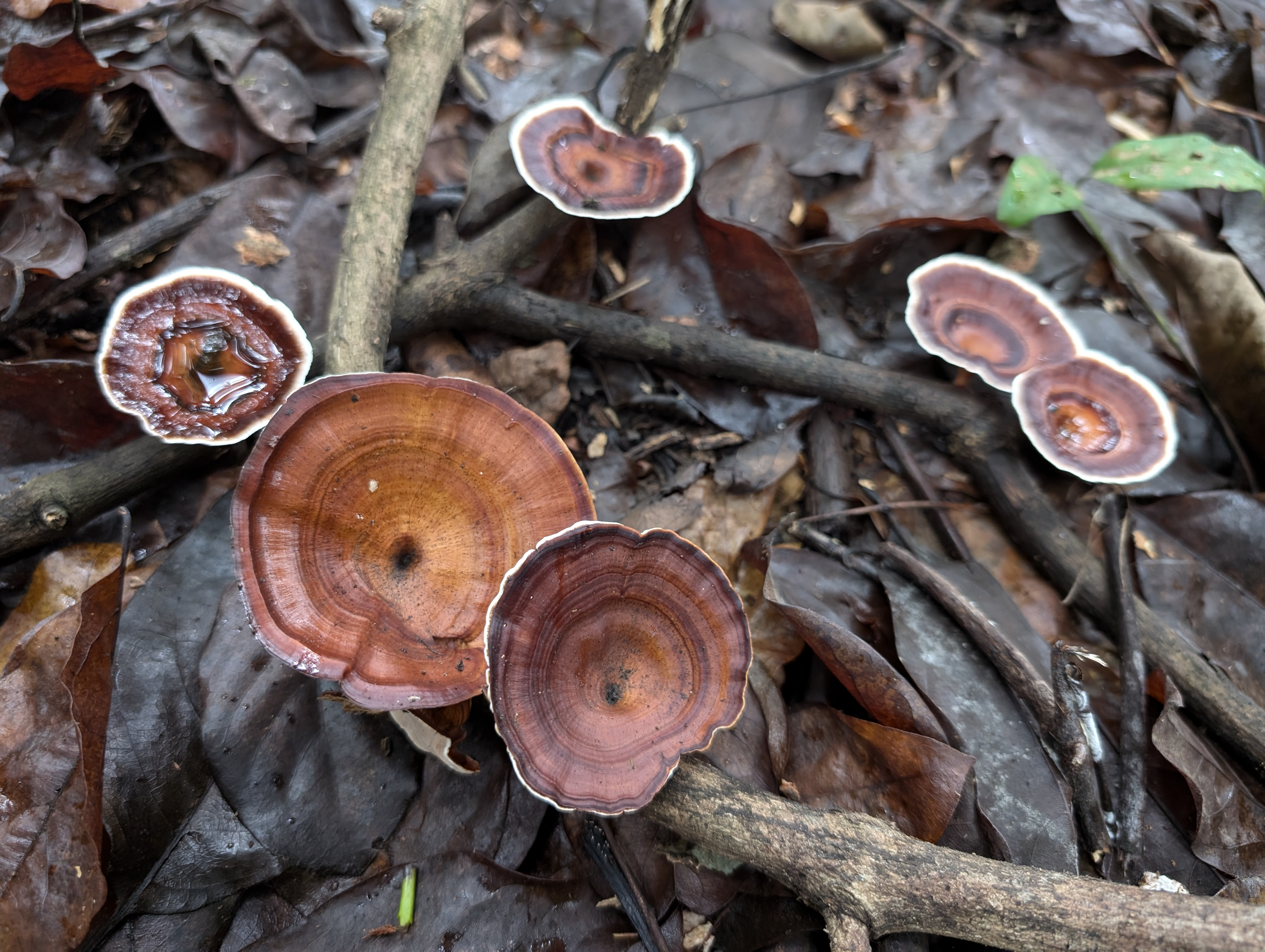
