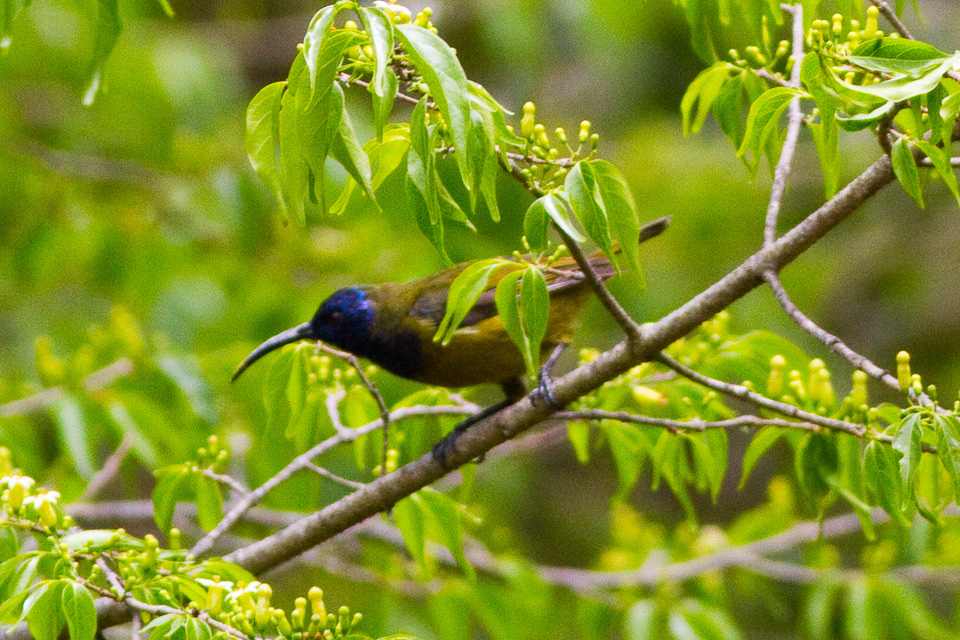

Conservation status
- Least Concern (IUCN 3.1)

Scientific classification
- Kingdom: Animalia
- Phylum: Chordata
- Class: Aves
- Order: Passeriformes
- Family: Nectariniidae
- Genus: Cyanomitra
- Species: C. oritis

Binomial name
- Cyanomitra oritis (Reichenow, 1892)

Synonyms
- Nectarinia oritis

= Cameroon sunbird =

Species of bird

The Cameroon sunbird (Cyanomitra oritis) is a species of bird in the family Nectariniidae. It is native to montane forests of Cameroon, Nigeria, and Equatorial Guinea, including the island of Bioko. It inhabits high-altitude forests and feeds primarily on nectar and insects. The species shows marked sexual dimorphism, with males displaying a metallic blue breast and duller females, and is known to make seasonal altitudinal movements. The species is classified as Least Concern by the International Union for Conservation of Nature (IUCN), although its population trend is decreasing due to habitat loss.

== Behavior-Call/Vocalization, Breeding, Migration ==
The vocalization of the Cameroon sunbird consists of a 'sequence of rapid, well spaced whistles described as "tiu tiu tiwu tiwu tiu tiu.'" Breeding has been recorded that eggs are laid from March-April and then from November-December. They build pear-shaped nests that are made from grass, moss, rootlets lined with fibre, silk-cotton, and dry grass. Cameroon sunbirds are considered non-migratory but make altitude movements. On Mount Cameroon, individuals have been observed descending to lower elevations between June and September.

== Sexual Dimorphism and Age-Based Differences ==
Males have an upper breast metallic steel-blue with violet reflections, with their hindneck and the rest of their body being olive-green. The bill is sharp, curved and black matching their legs. The eyes have a dark brown iris with a bright, pale blue eyering. Females differ from males, lacking pectoral tufts. Females appear olive-brown. Their underparts are yellow-tinged and duller than males. Females have a shorter, less curved bill. As juveniles, they appear duller above and below. The metallic areas are instead brown or grey with a bright yellow belly. The throat and breast are steel-blue rather than deep purplish-blue. Immatures have a shorter bill and appear darker olive. Head gloss is more greenish, with the metallic blue continuing from the hindneck farther down the breast.

== Diet/Habitat ==
The Cameroon sunbird occurs in montane forests of Cameroon, Nigeria and Equatorial Guinea, including the island of Bioko. Montane forests are "high-altitude, biodiversity-rich cloud forests found above 1,600m on volcanic peaks, characterized by a dense, humid canopy" of many different species of trees. This bird primarily feeds on small insects and nectar. They forage individually or in pairs, and occasionally in large groups near flowering trees.

== Conservation/Red List Evaluation ==
The Cameroon sunbird is not a concern according to the IUCN Red List evaluation. This species is classified under the Least Concern category. The global population is unquantified but is stable. The population trend has been noted as declining. Some species of sunbirds live between 2-8 years, Cameroon sunbirds have an average generation length of 2.7 years. Habitat loss caused by agricultural expansion, logging, and infrastructure development is considered the primary threat to the species.
