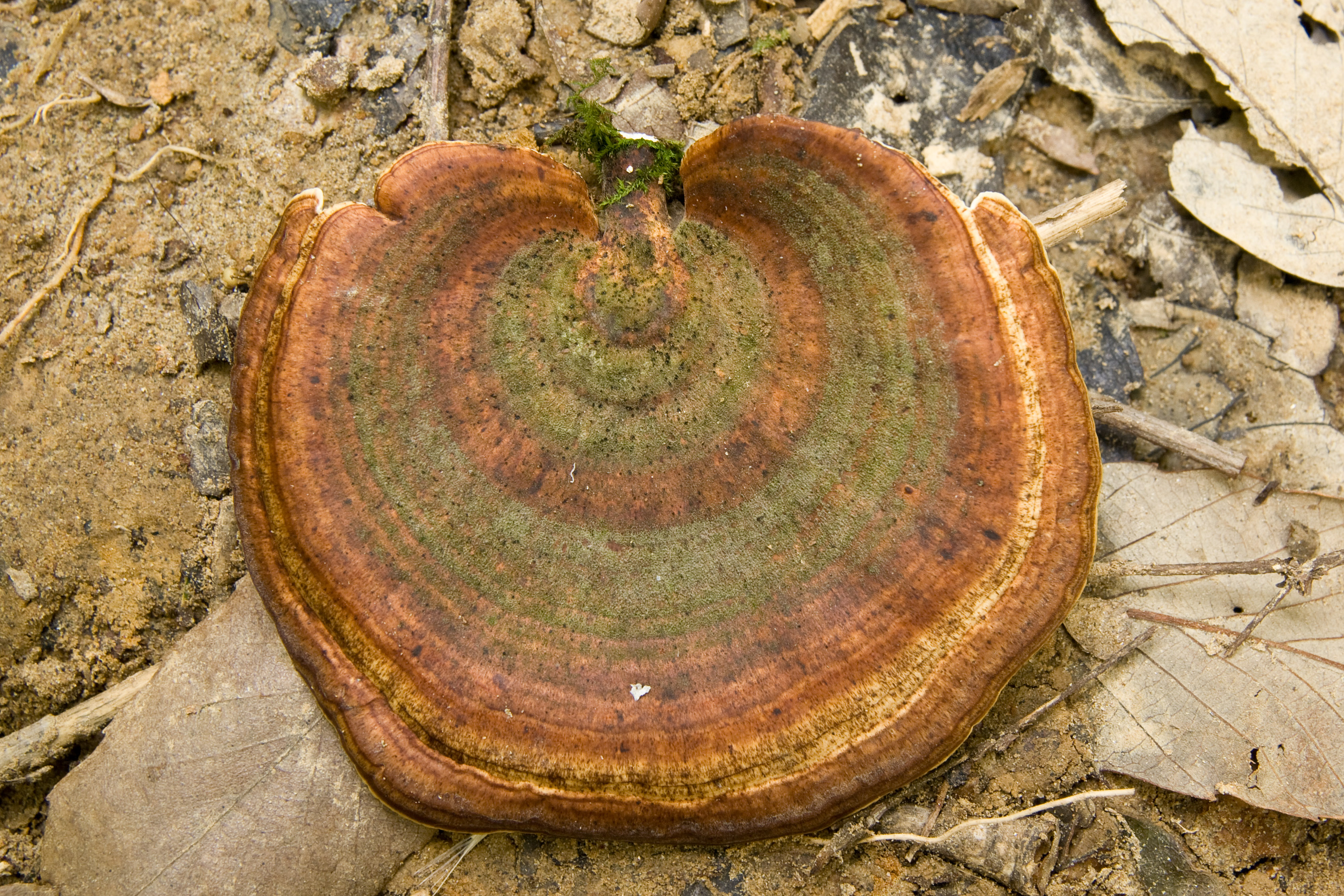
- Microporus affinis

Scientific classification
- Domain: Eukaryota
- Kingdom: Fungi
- Division: Basidiomycota
- Class: Agaricomycetes
- Order: Polyporales
- Family: Polyporaceae
- Genus: Microporus; P.Beauv. (1805)

Type species
- Microporus perula P.Beauv. (1804)

Species
- 11 species, see text

Synonyms
- Tomentoporus Ryvarden (1973)

= Microporus =

Genus of fungi

Microporus is a genus of fungi in the family Polyporaceae. The genus has a widespread distribution and, according to a 2008 estimate, contains 11 species. The genus name combines the Ancient Greek words μικρός ("small") and πόρος ("pore").

== Species ==
As of January 2017, Index Fungorum accepts 12 species in Microporus:

- M. affinis (Blume & T.Nees) Kuntze (1898)
- M. affinis-microloma (Lloyd) T.Hatt. & Sotome (2013)
- M. atroalbus (Henn.) Kuntze (1898)
- M. atrovillosus Ryvarden (1975)
- M. concinnus P.Beauv. (1804)
- M. incomptus (Afzel. ex Fr.) Kuntze (1898)
- M. internuntius (Corner) T. Hatt. (2005)
- M. longisporus T.Hatt. (2000)
- M. luteoceraceus D.A.Reid (1986) – Peninsular Malaysia
- M. nipponicus (Yasuda) Imazeki (1943)
- M. subvernicipes (Murrill) T.Hatt. & Sotome (2013)
- M. xanthopus (Fr.) Kuntze (1898)

== Chemistry ==
Seven novel diterpene molecules, microporenic acids A–G, were isolated from the cultures of an undescribed species of Microporus found in the Kakamega Forest of Kenya. These compounds have antimicrobial activity against several Gram-positive bacteria, and also inhibit the formation of biofilm by Staphylococcus aureus.
