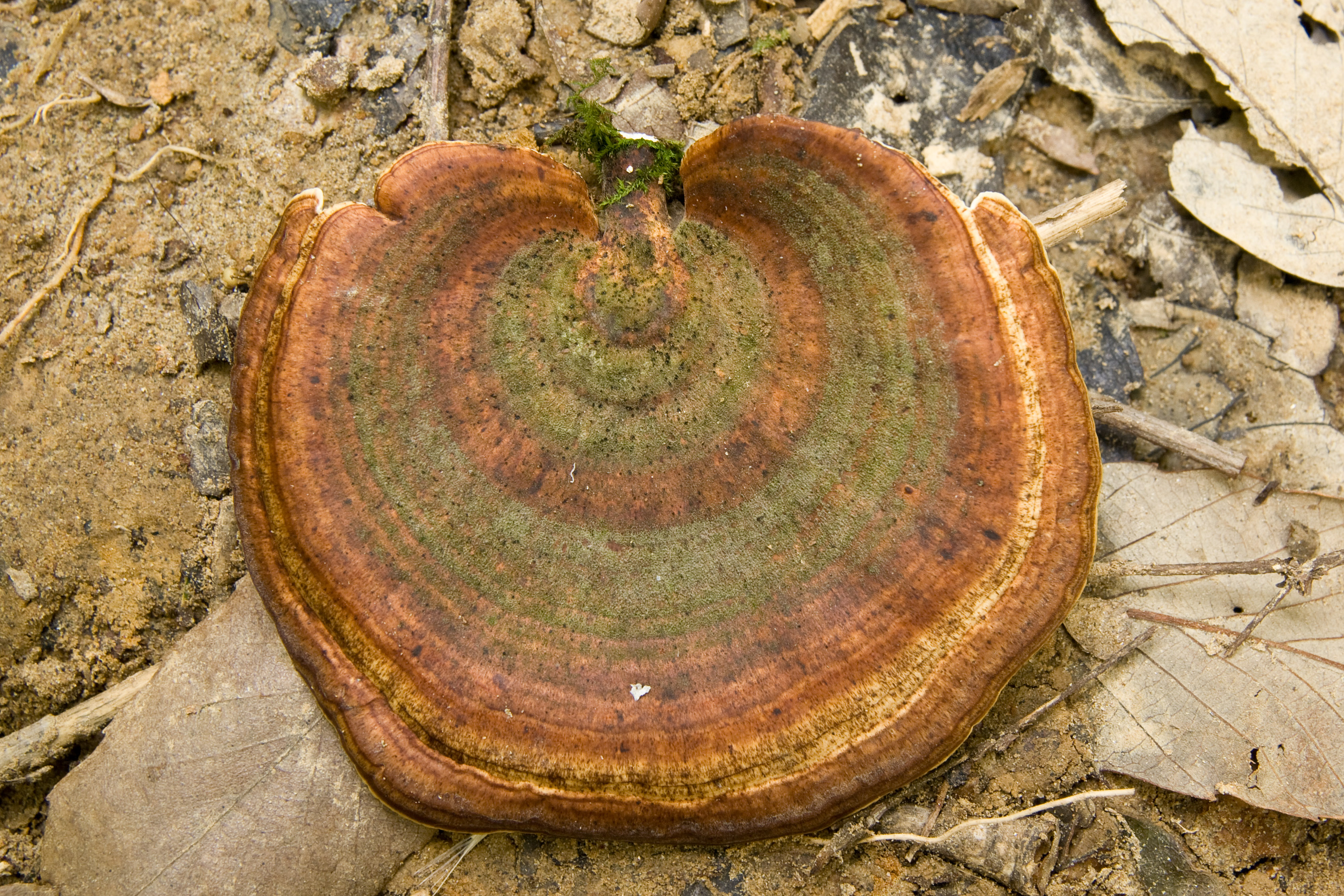

Scientific classification
- Domain: Eukaryota
- Kingdom: Fungi
- Division: Basidiomycota
- Class: Agaricomycetes
- Order: Polyporales
- Family: Polyporaceae
- Genus: Microporus
- Species: M. affinis

Binomial name
- Microporus affinis (Blume & T.Nees) Kuntze (1898)

Synonyms
- Polyporus affinis Blume & T.Nees (1826)

= Microporus affinis =

Species of fungus

Microporus affinis is a fungus species in the family Polyporaceae. It was first described in 1826 as a species of Polyporus by German botanists Carl Ludwig Blume and Theodor Nees. Otto Kuntze transferred it to Microporus in 1898. It is a widespread polypore that is common in tropical and subtropical regions of both the Northern and Southern Hemispheres.
