= Forest Hills, Kloof =

No 3 Forest Hills
- Location within KwaZulu-Natal Location within South Africa
- Coordinates: 29°45′S 30°49′E
- Country: South Africa
- Province: KwaZulu-Natal
- Municipality: eThekwini
- Main Place: Kloof

Area
  - Total: 4.30 km^{2} (1.66 sq mi)

Population (2011)
  - Total: 2,673
  - Density: 622/km^{2} (1,610/sq mi)

Racial makeup (2011)
  - Black African: 10.3%
  - Coloured: 1.0%
  - Indian/Asian: 2.1%
  - White: 85.7%
  - Other: 1.0%

First languages (2011)
  - English: 81.2%
  - Afrikaans: 10.5%
  - Zulu: 5.4%
  - Other: 2.9%
- Time zone: UTC+2 (SAST)
- Postal code (street): 3610
- PO box: 3624

Forest Hills is a suburb in the Outer West suburbs of Durban, Kwa-Zulu Natal, South Africa. The area borders on the Kloof Gorge which forms part of the Krantzkloof Nature Reserve, and is situated in between Kloof and Waterfall which is also about 7 km from Hillcrest. Forest Hills is referred to as being part of the Kloof area as they are both situated on opposite sides of the Kloof Gorge, as a result the areas are joined by one road (Bridle Road) which runs through the Kloof Gorge.

== Tornado ==
In late 2008 the area was struck by a tornado, surprising the South African Weather Service.
