= Springside Nature Reserve =

Nature reserve in KwaZulu-Natal, South Africa

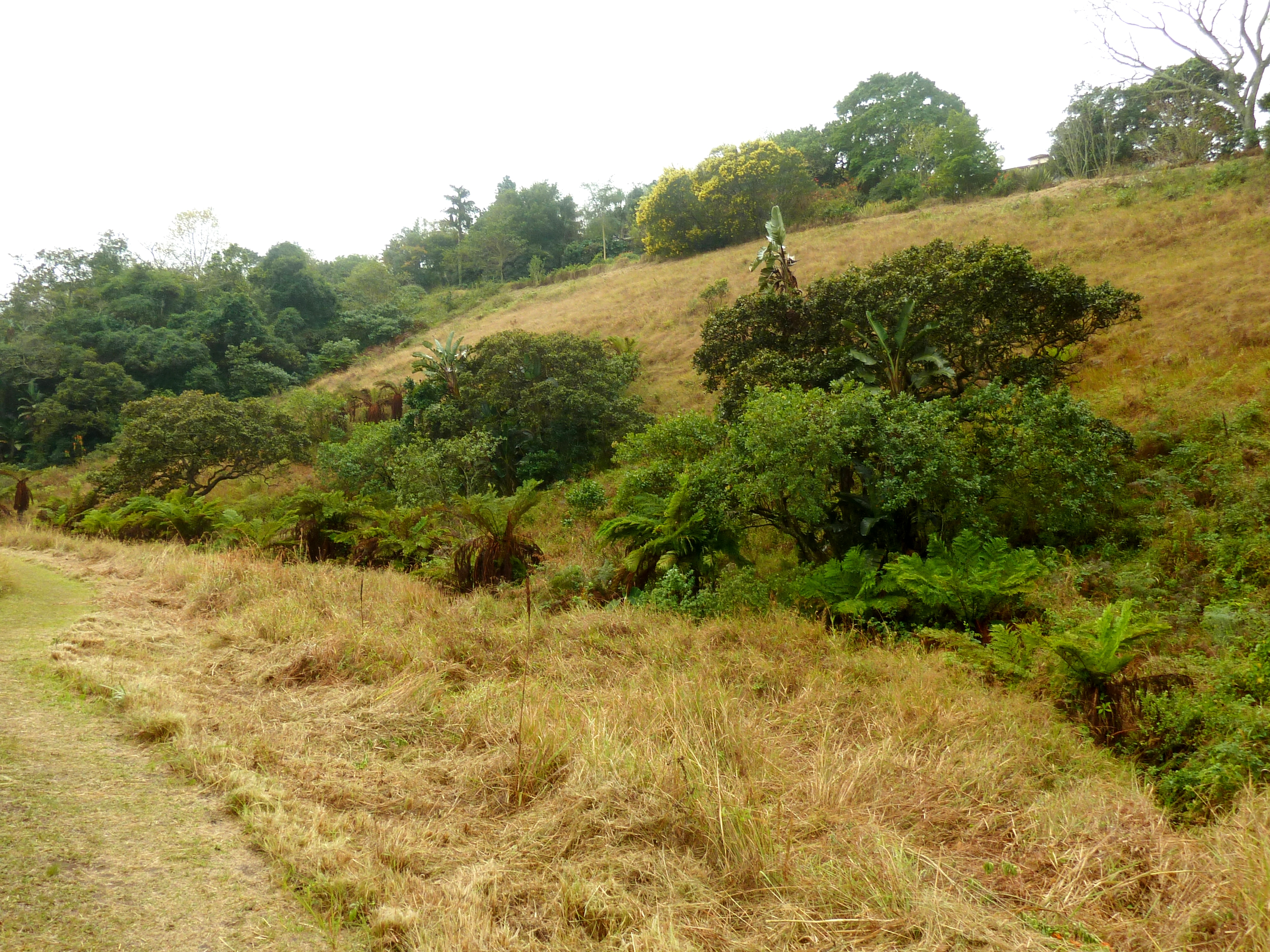
- View on the grassland and stream vegetation

- Location within KwaZulu-Natal
- Location: KwaZulu-Natal, South Africa
- Nearest city: Pinetown
- Coordinates: 29°46′44″S 30°46′19″E
- Established: 1948

The Springside Nature Reserve, proclaimed in 1948, is situated in Hillcrest, KwaZulu-Natal. It conserves 21 ha of forest, grassland and wetland, and is managed by the eThekwini municipality and Hillcrest Conservancy. It was developed jointly by the Wildlife Society and the Hillcrest town board.

== Fauna and flora ==
Some 150 species of bird have been recorded, including forest weaver and visiting crowned eagles. Plants include tree ferns, waterberry and wild pomegranate. The reserve is relatively free of exotics, and a planned burning regime was implemented, which results in vigorous blooming of grassland flora when spring rains commence.

== Access and facilities ==
The entrance gate is opened at 7:30 am and closed at 4:00 pm. There are picnic and braai facilities, but no accommodation, and the resource centre can be booked for small meetings. A visitor can go on self-guided walks, or take part in organised wild flower (October, after burns) or monthly bird watching walks, which start at 7:30 am (summer) or 8:30 am (winter), on the second Wednesday of a month.
