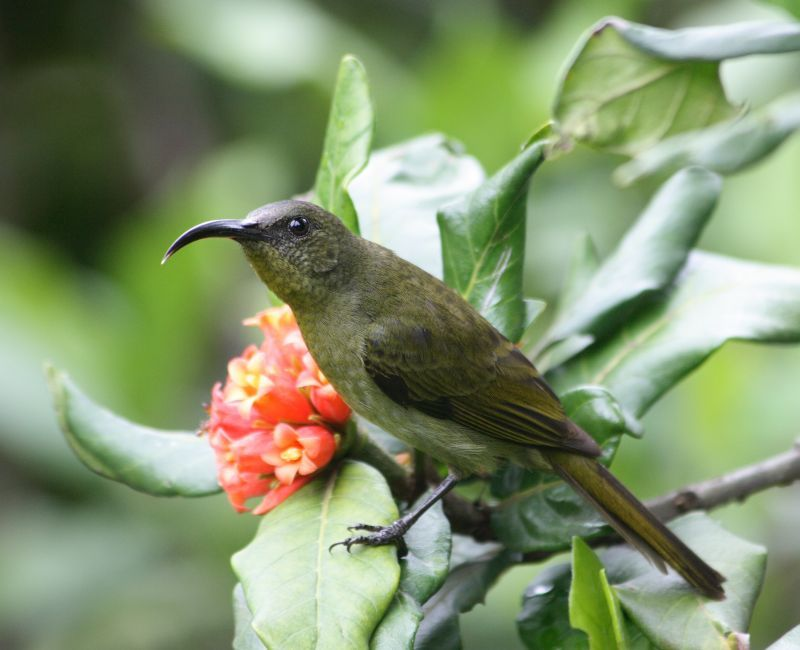
- Eastern olive sunbird (Cyanomitra olivacea)

Scientific classification
- Kingdom: Animalia
- Phylum: Chordata
- Class: Aves
- Order: Passeriformes
- Family: Nectariniidae
- Genus: Cyanomitra; Reichenbach, 1853

Type species
- Certhia cyanocephala Shaw, 1812

Species
- See text

= Cyanomitra =

Genus of birds

Cyanomitra is a genus of African sunbirds. Its members are sometimes included in Nectarinia.

The sunbirds are a group of very small Old World passerine birds which feed largely on nectar, although they will also take insects, especially when feeding young. Flight is fast and direct on their short wings. Most species can take nectar by hovering like a hummingbird, but usually perch to feed most of the time.

== Taxonomy ==
The genus Cyanomitra was introduced in 1853 by the German naturalist Ludwig Reichenbach. The name combines the Ancient Greek kuanos meaning "dark-blue" with mitra meaning "head-band". The type species was designated by George Robert Gray in 1855 as Certhia cyanocephala Shaw. This taxon is now considered to be a subspecies of the green-headed sunbird (Cyanomitra verticalis cyanocephala'').

=== Species ===
The genus contains the following seven species:

Image	Common name	Scientific name	Distribution
	Green-headed sunbird	Cyanomitra verticalis	widely distributed across west and central Africa
	Bannerman's sunbird	Cyanomitra bannermani	Angola, Democratic Republic of the Congo, and Zambia.
	Blue-throated brown sunbird	Cyanomitra cyanolaema	African tropical rainforest
	Cameroon sunbird	Cyanomitra oritis	Western High Plateau & Bioko
	Blue-headed sunbird	Cyanomitra alinae	Albertine Rift montane forests
	Olive sunbird	Cyanomitra olivacea	Africa south of the Sahel.
	Grey sunbird	Cyanomitra veroxii	Kenya, Malawi, Mozambique, Somalia, South Africa, Swaziland, and Tanzania.
