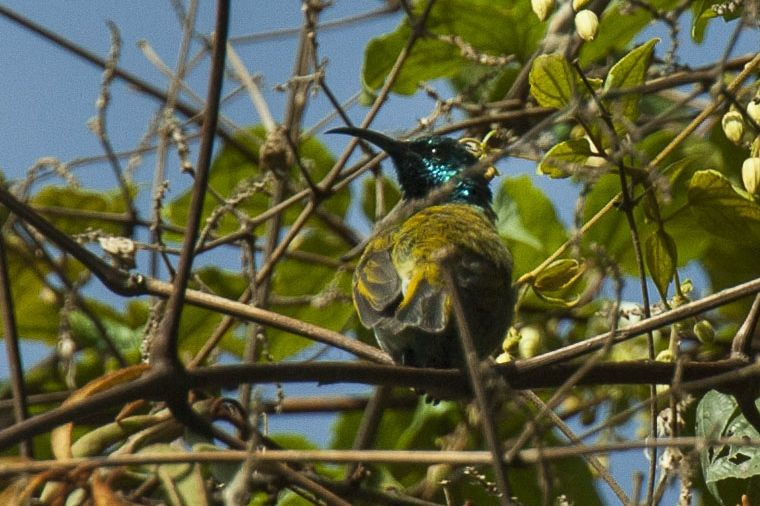

Conservation status
- Least Concern (IUCN 3.1)

Scientific classification
- Kingdom: Animalia
- Phylum: Chordata
- Class: Aves
- Order: Passeriformes
- Family: Nectariniidae
- Genus: Cyanomitra
- Species: C. alinae

Binomial name
- Cyanomitra alinae Jackson, 1904

Synonyms
- Nectarinia alinae

= Blue-headed sunbird =

Species of bird

The blue-headed sunbird (Cyanomitra alinae) is a species of bird in the family Nectariniidae. It is native to the Albertine Rift montane forests.
