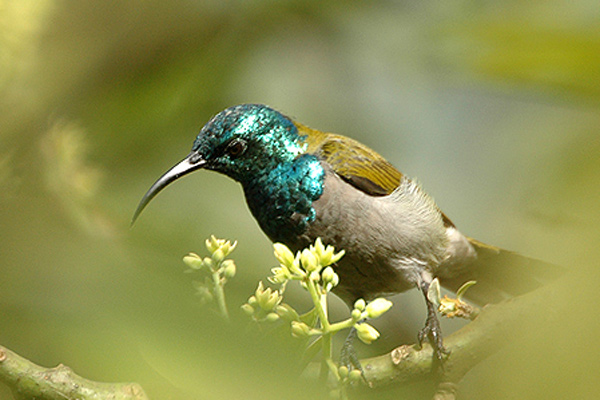
- Male, Uganda
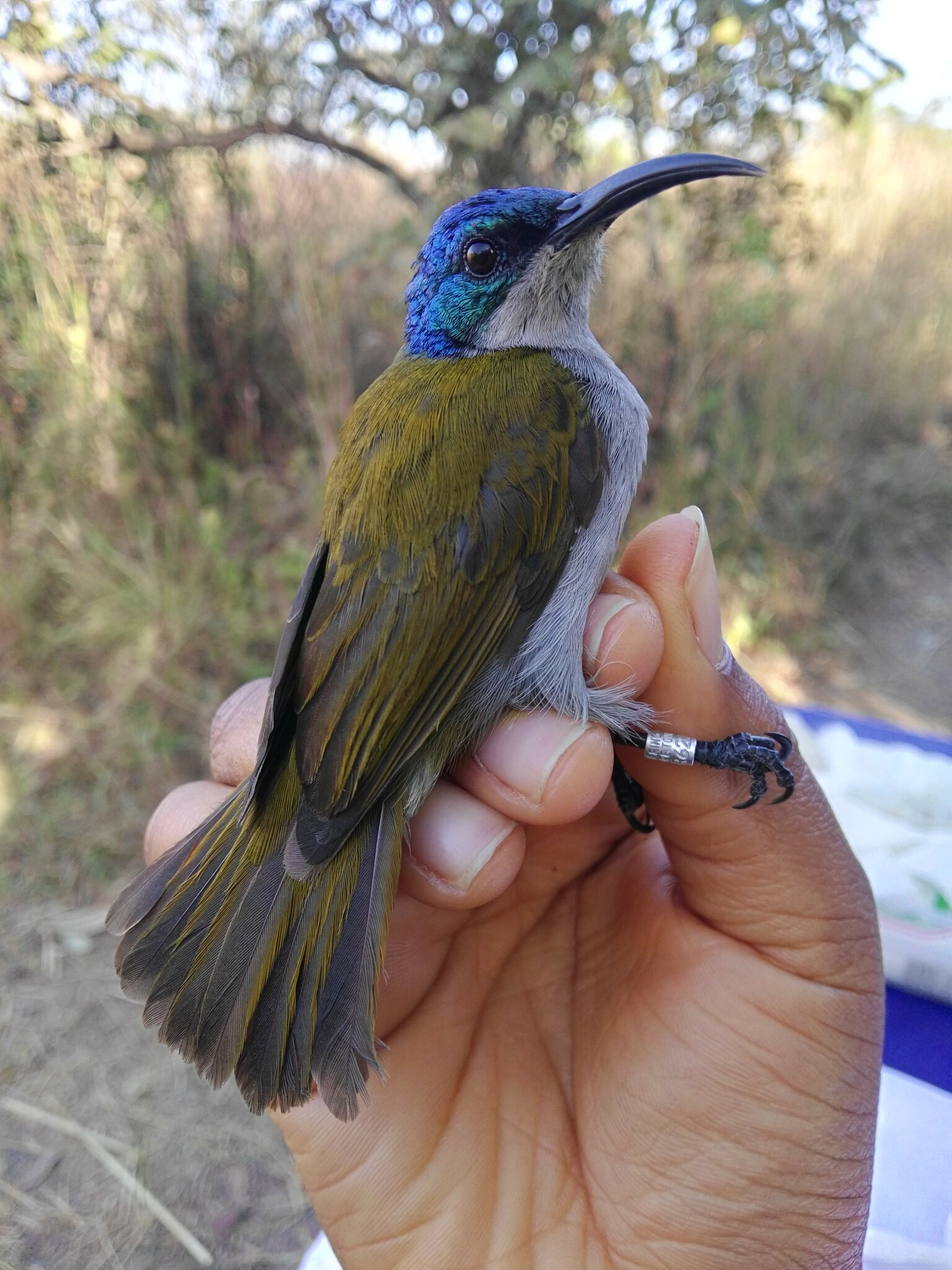
- Female

Conservation status
- Least Concern (IUCN 3.1)

Scientific classification
- Kingdom: Animalia
- Phylum: Chordata
- Class: Aves
- Order: Passeriformes
- Family: Nectariniidae
- Genus: Cyanomitra
- Species: C. verticalis

Binomial name
- Cyanomitra verticalis (Latham, 1790)

Synonyms
- Nectarinia verticalis

= Green-headed sunbird =

Species of bird

The green-headed sunbird (Cyanomitra verticalis) is a species of bird in the family Nectariniidae. It is found in Angola, Benin, Burkina Faso, Burundi, Cameroon, Central African Republic, Republic of the Congo, Democratic Republic of the Congo, Ivory Coast, Equatorial Guinea, Gabon, Gambia, Ghana, Guinea, Guinea-Bissau, Kenya, Liberia, Malawi, Mali, Nigeria, Rwanda, Senegal, Sierra Leone, South Sudan, Tanzania, Togo, Uganda, and Zambia.
