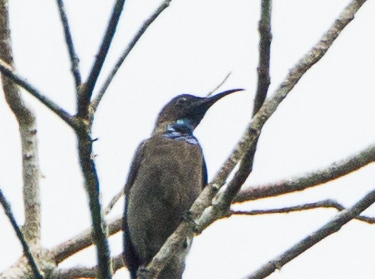

Conservation status
- Least Concern (IUCN 3.1)

Scientific classification
- Kingdom: Animalia
- Phylum: Chordata
- Class: Aves
- Order: Passeriformes
- Family: Nectariniidae
- Genus: Cyanomitra
- Species: C. cyanolaema

Binomial name
- Cyanomitra cyanolaema (Jardine & Fraser, 1852)

Synonyms
- Nectarinia cyanolaema

= Blue-throated brown sunbird =

Species of bird

The blue-throated brown sunbird (Cyanomitra cyanolaema) is a species of bird in the family Nectariniidae.

It is widespread across the African tropical rainforest.
