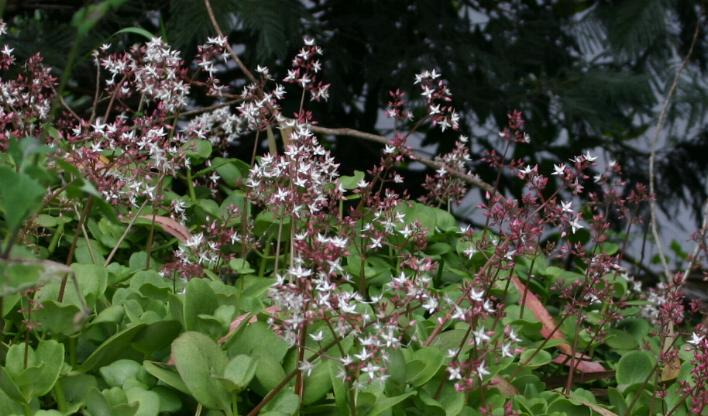
- Crassula multicava leaves and flowers

Scientific classification
- Kingdom: Plantae
- Clade: Tracheophytes
- Clade: Angiosperms
- Clade: Eudicots
- Order: Saxifragales
- Family: Crassulaceae
- Genus: Crassula
- Species: C. multicava

Binomial name
- Crassula multicava Lemaire.

Synonyms
- Crassula quadrifida

= Crassula multicava =

Fairy crassula

Species of succulent

Crassula multicava is a perennial succulent plant from the family Crassulaceae. It is also known under various English common names including the fairy crassula, pitted crassula and London pride. In Zulu, it is known as umadinsane, one of several plants known by this name.

== Description ==
It is a moderate to fast growing, mat-forming plant that features buxom, oval to round and deep green, opposite leaves, with one cultivar ('Purple Dragon') having purple undersides. The plant blooms in winter in its native habitat with white to pinkish starry flowers with four petals and four sepals. It reaches an average height of 15 cm, but would reach 30 cm.

== Cultivation ==
Used as a groundcover, the plant is resistant to droughts and low temperatures above −3 °C. It also resists the lack of light and is a shade lover, but that can negatively affect its color or the quality of the flowers. Self-seeding, it can also be multiplied by cuttings. They also propagate themselves by producing plantlets on the flower head that fall off and grow into independent plants. Due to its small size, it can be grown in pots in well-composted, clay soils.

== Distribution ==
The fairy crassula is a native of South Africa, particularly the mountainous regions of Natal, Eastern and Southern Cape. There, it is found in forest margins, river and stream banks, and in coastal and subtropical thickets.

== Gallery ==
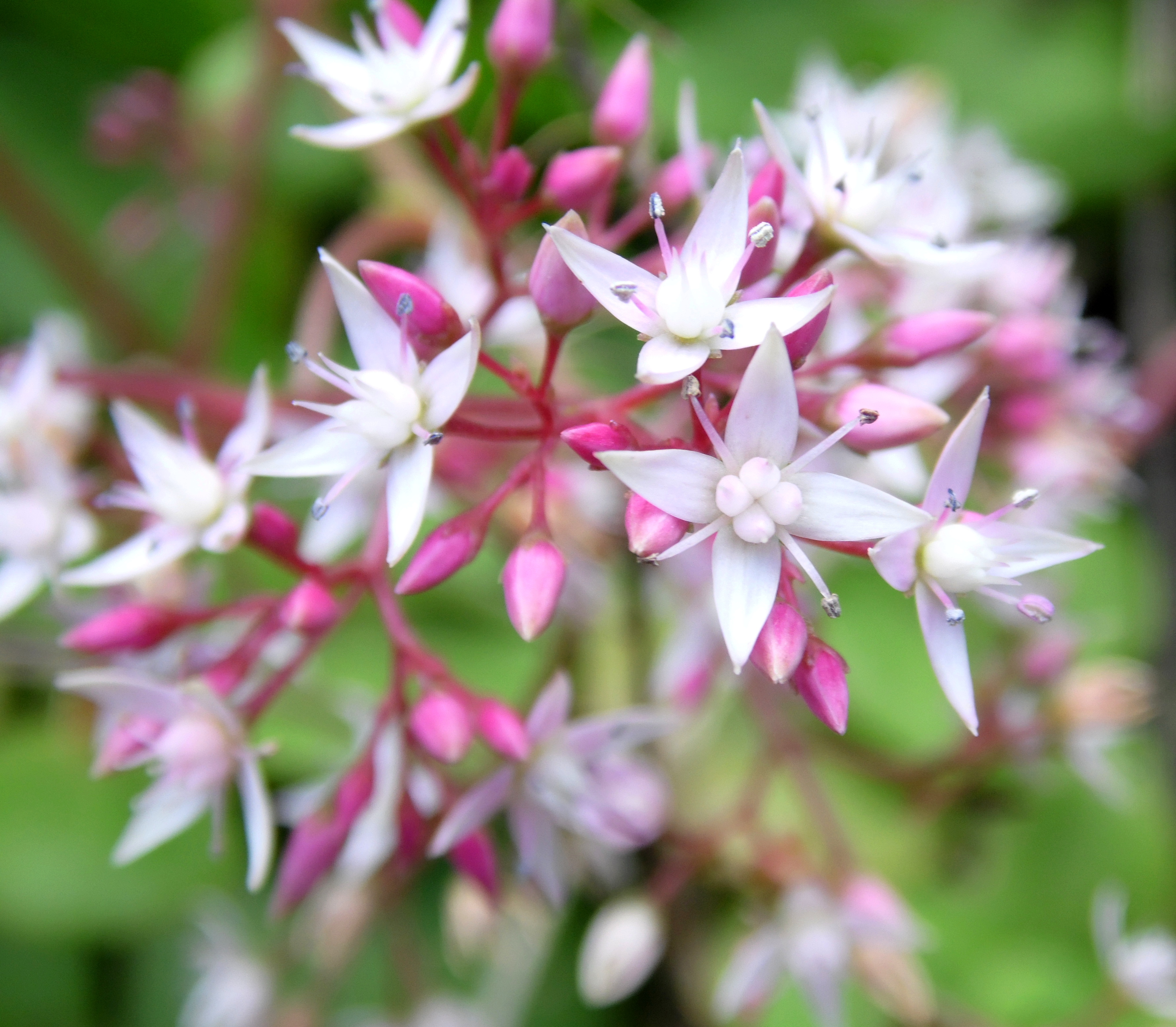
Bunch of flowers

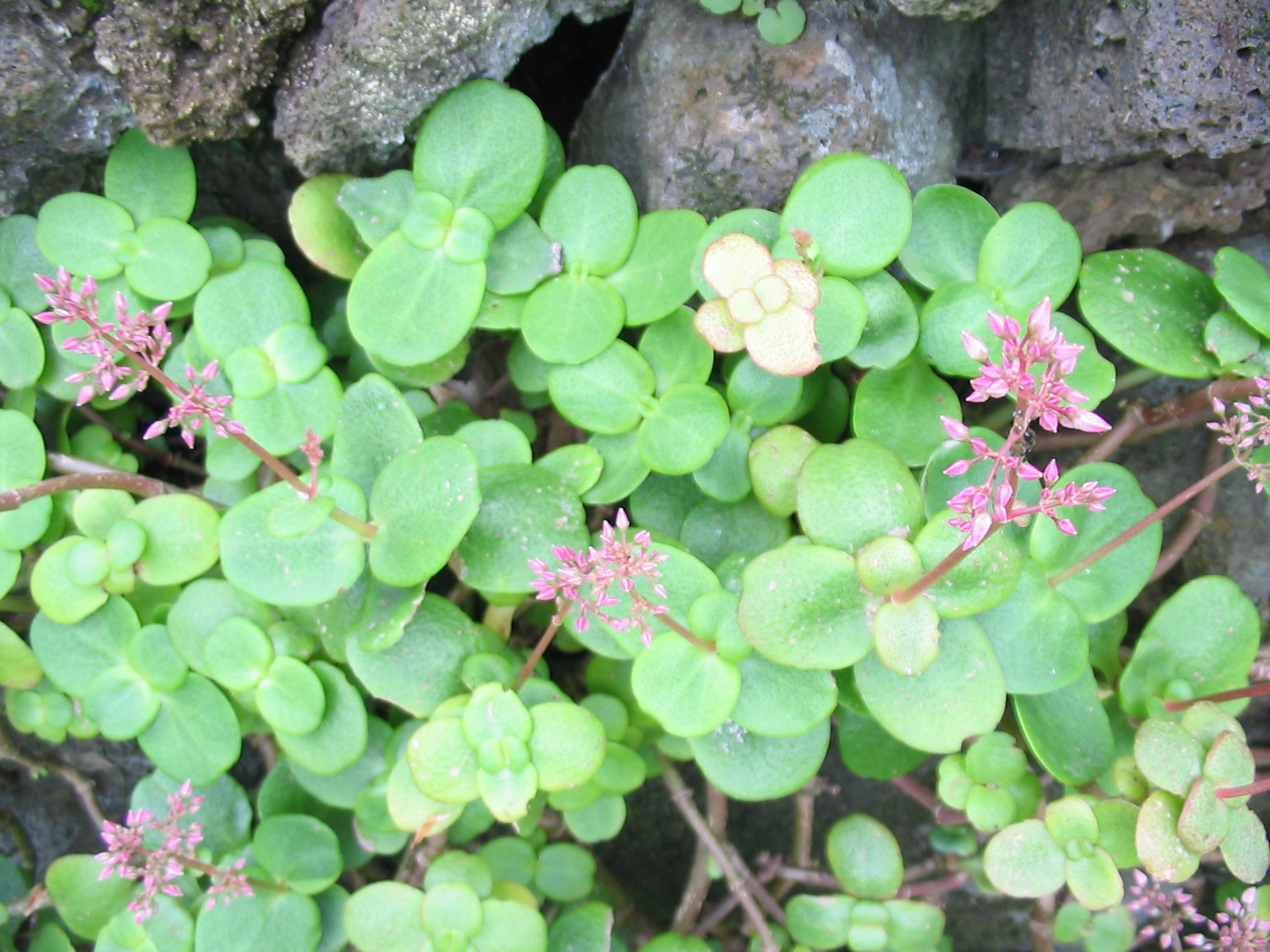
Habitat with emerging flowers

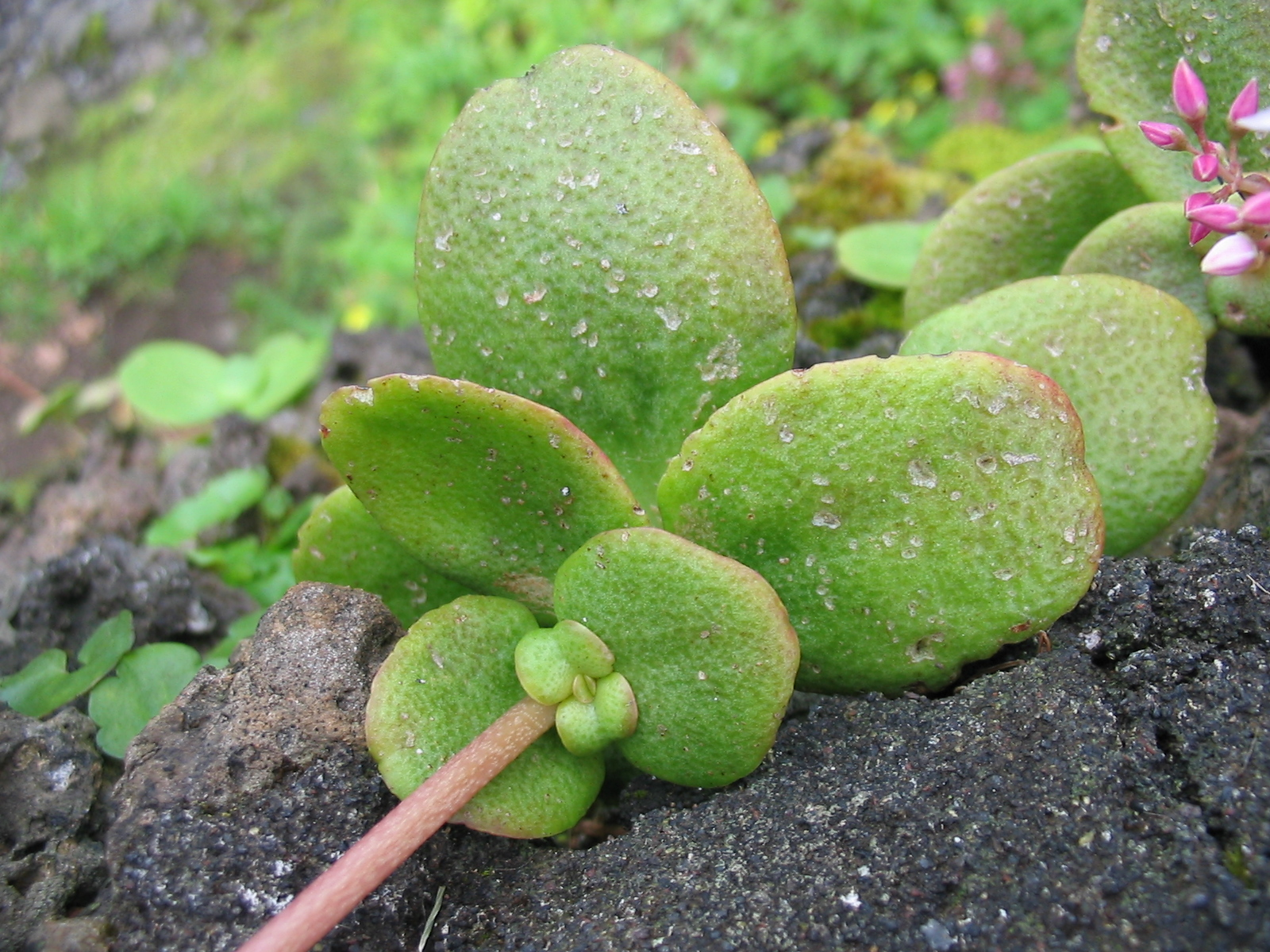
Leaves close up

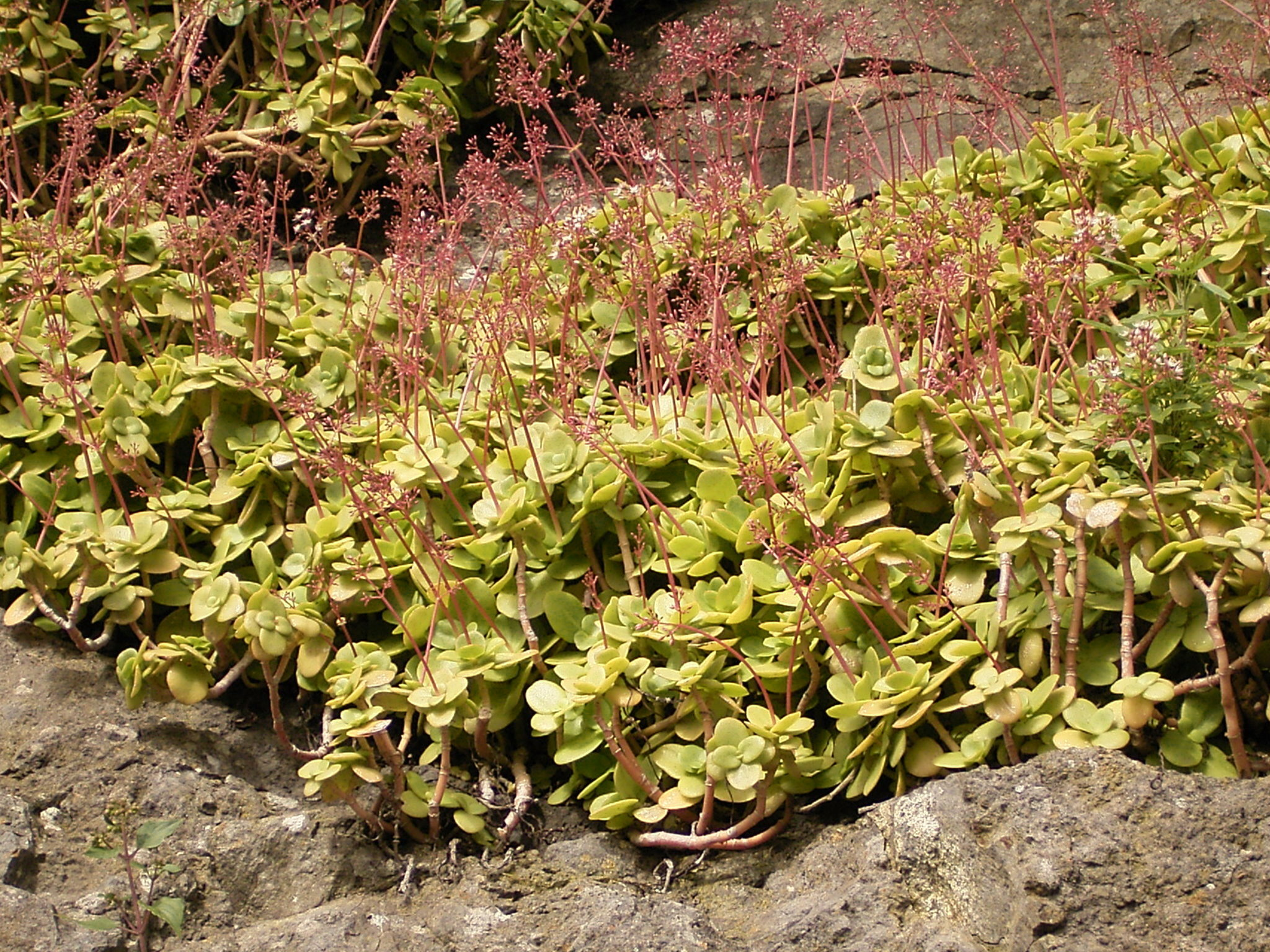
Growing in Barlovento, Santa Cruz de Tenerife

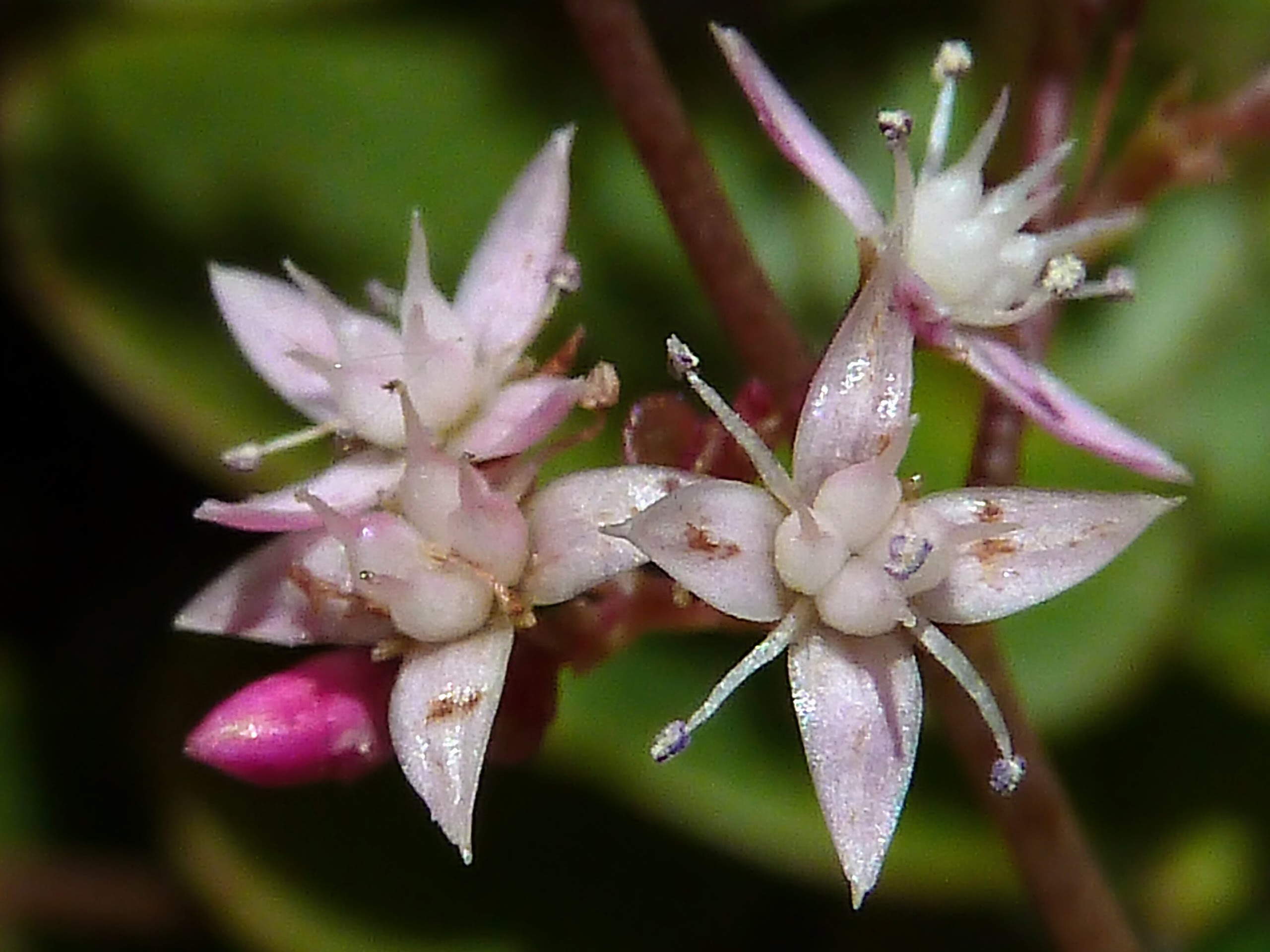
Flowers close-up

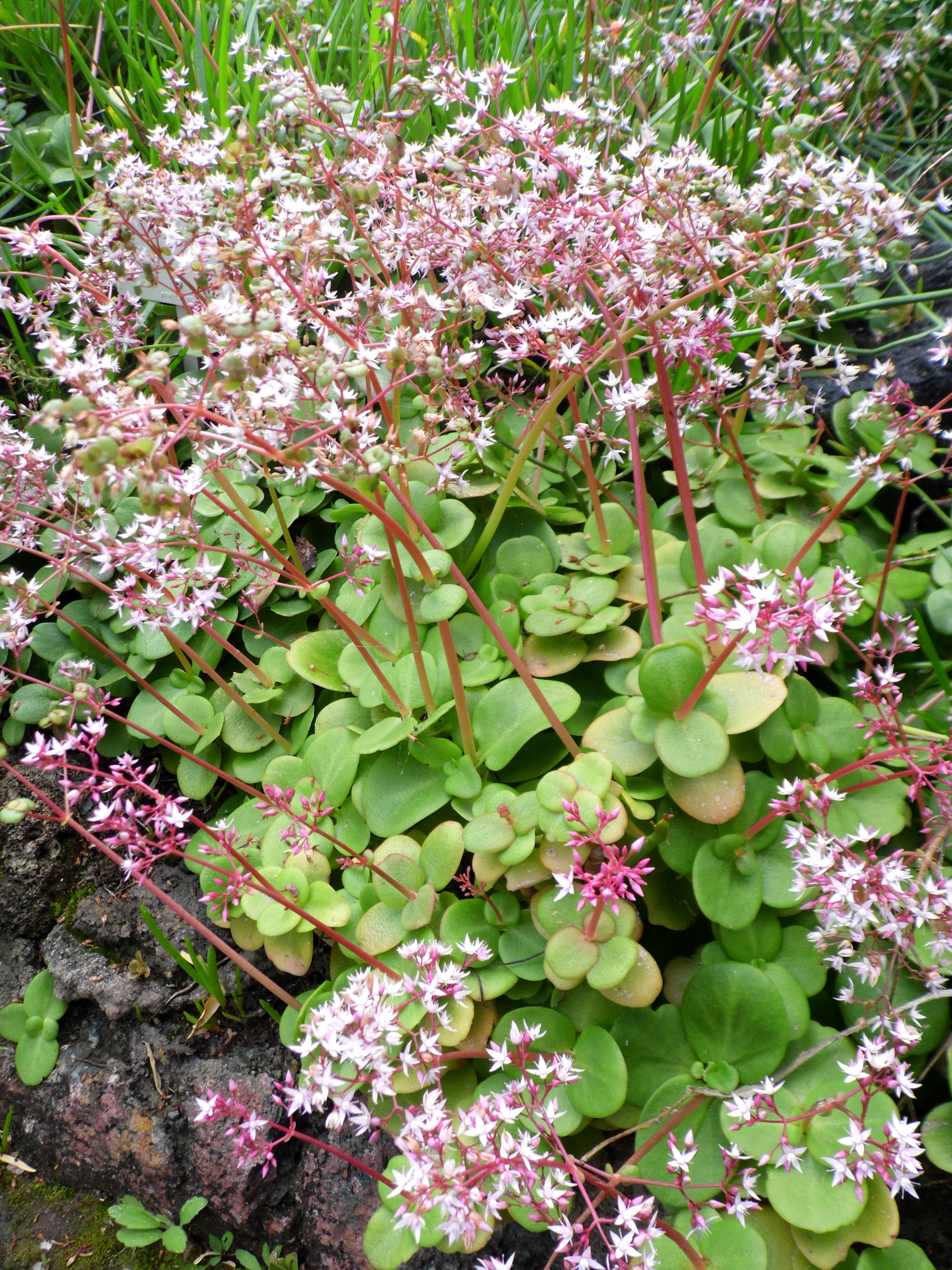
Whole plant with flowers

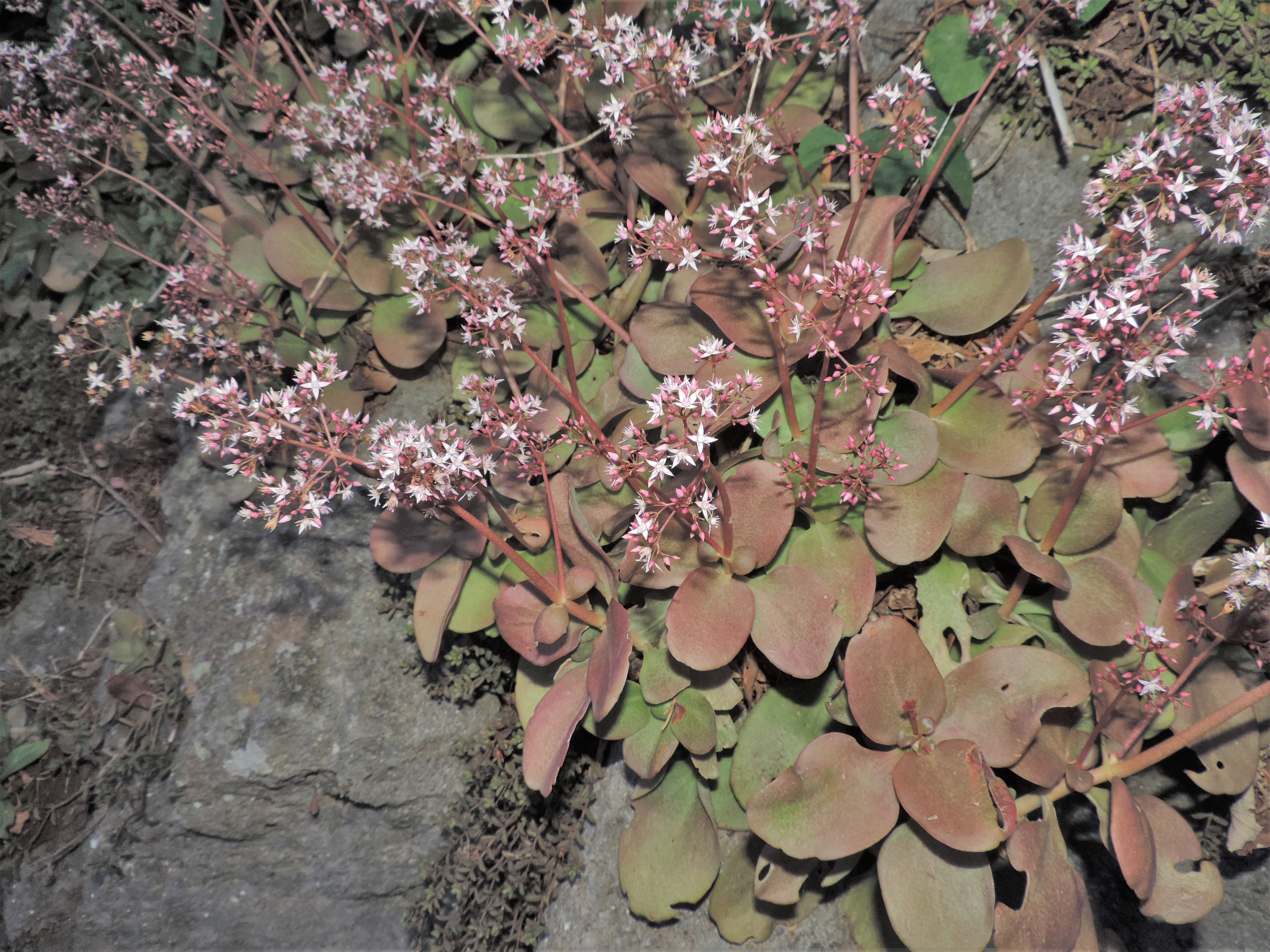
Blushed leaves
