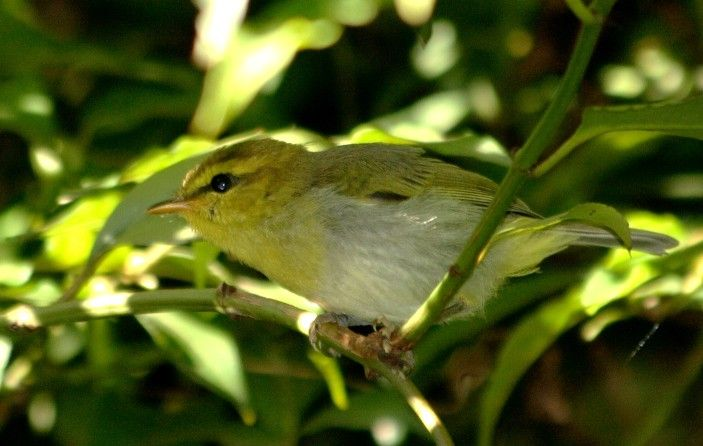
- Pietermaritzburg, South Africa

Conservation status
- Least Concern (IUCN 3.1)

Scientific classification
- Kingdom: Animalia
- Phylum: Chordata
- Class: Aves
- Order: Passeriformes
- Family: Phylloscopidae
- Genus: Phylloscopus
- Species: P. ruficapilla

Binomial name
- Phylloscopus ruficapilla (Sundevall, 1850)

Synonyms
- Culicipeta ruficapilla

= Yellow-throated woodland warbler =

Species of bird

The yellow-throated woodland warbler (Phylloscopus ruficapilla) is a species of Old World warbler in the family Phylloscopidae. It is endemic to the Afromontane, from Kenya to South Africa. Its natural habitats are subtropical or tropical dry forest and subtropical or tropical moist lowland forest.

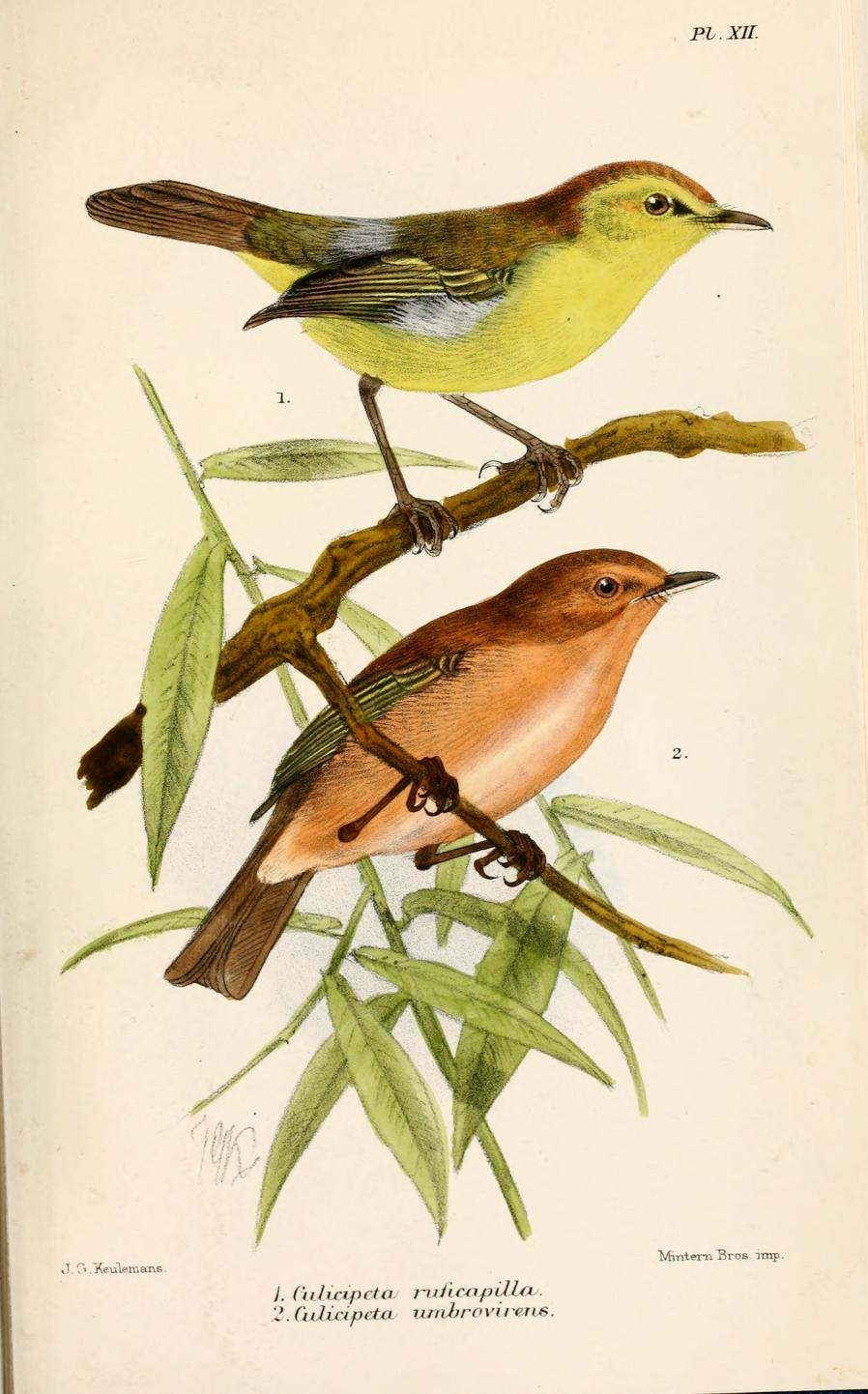
Phylloscopus ruficapilla (above), illustration by Keulemans, 1879
