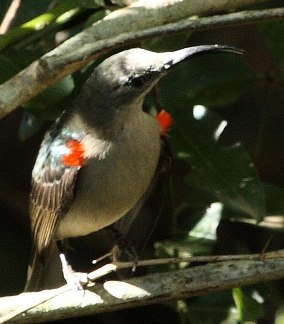

Conservation status
- Least Concern (IUCN 3.1)

Scientific classification
- Kingdom: Animalia
- Phylum: Chordata
- Class: Aves
- Order: Passeriformes
- Family: Nectariniidae
- Genus: Cyanomitra
- Species: C. veroxii

Binomial name
- Cyanomitra veroxii (Smith, A, 1832)

Synonyms
- Nectarinia veroxii, Cyanomitra veroxii

= Grey sunbird =

Species of bird

The grey sunbird or mouse-coloured sunbird (Cyanomitra veroxii) is a species of bird in the family Nectariniidae. It is native to shoreline areas of Africa, from Somalia to South Africa.

== Diet ==
This species feeds on nectar. It has been recorded to feed on the nectar of Schotia brachypetala and Kigelia africana. It even engages in nectar robbing by piercing a hole in the side of the corolla. It is also a pollinator of 10 genera of plants with uses that are medicinal, edible or may be used as a building material.

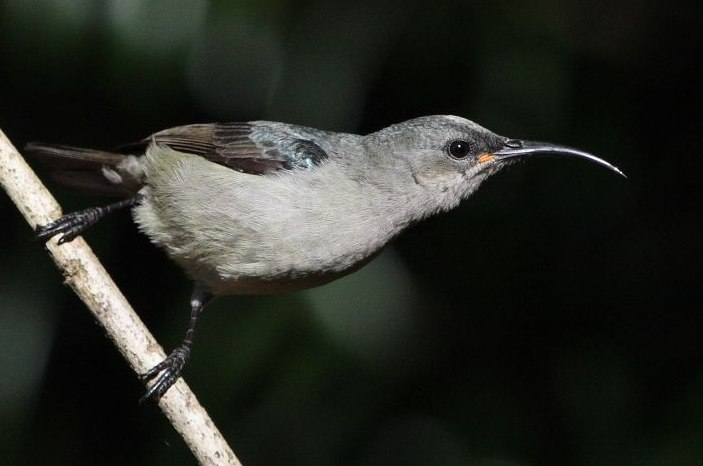
Juvenile
