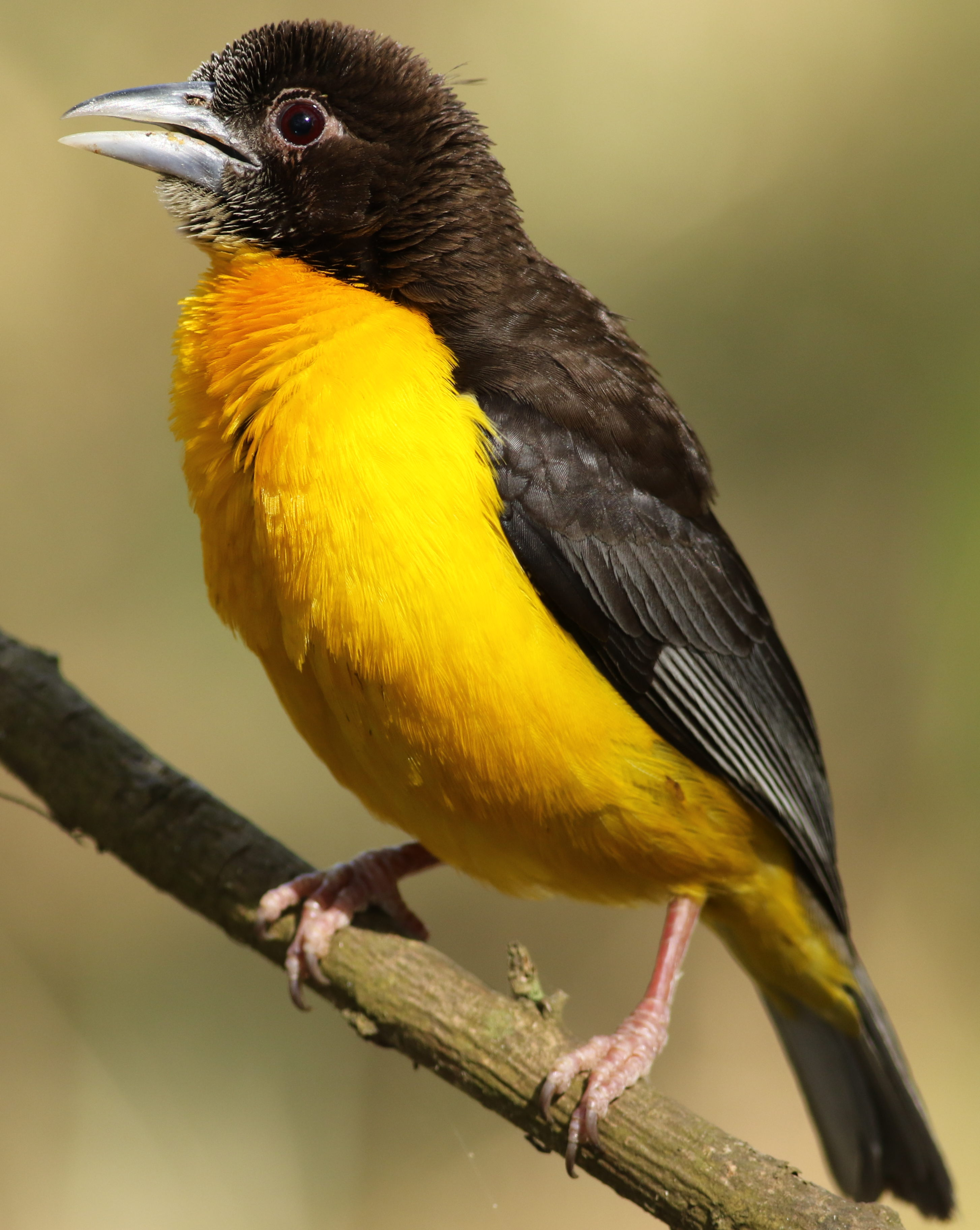
- Dark-backed weaver at Ndumo Game Reserve, KwaZulu-Natal, South Africa

Conservation status
- Least Concern (IUCN 3.1)

Scientific classification
- Kingdom: Animalia
- Phylum: Chordata
- Class: Aves
- Order: Passeriformes
- Family: Ploceidae
- Genus: Ploceus
- Species: P. bicolor

Binomial name
- Ploceus bicolor Vieillot, 1819

= Dark-backed weaver =

Species of bird

The dark-backed weaver (Ploceus bicolor), also known as the forest weaver, is a species of bird in the family Ploceidae. It is very sparsely present across central and southern Sub-Saharan Africa.
