= IIndman =

iindman
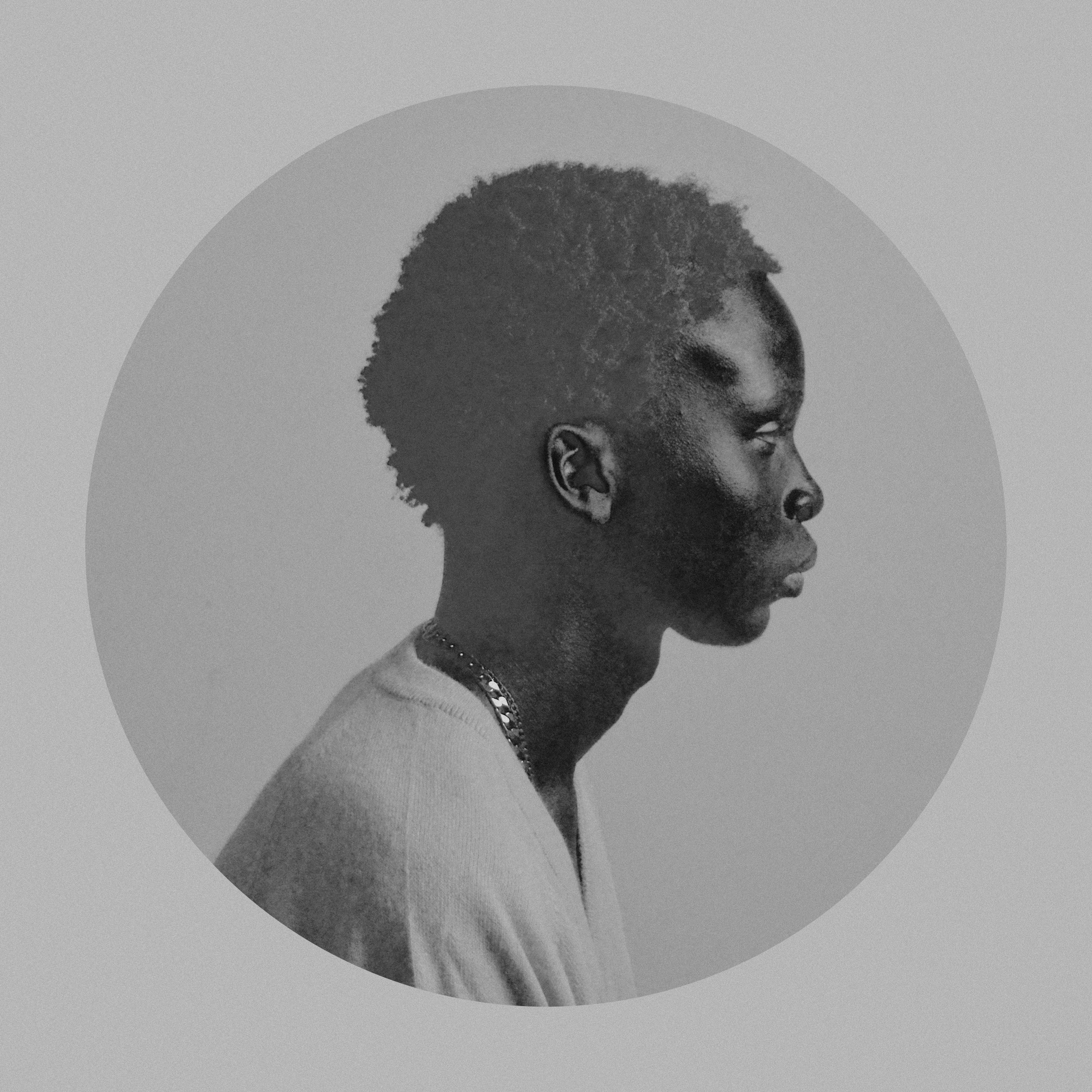

Background information
- Also known as: Tlhap, IIndMan & MuthafuckinIIndman
- Born: Phenyo Kgaffe; 25 November 1992 (age 33); Mahikeng, North West Province
- Genres: Electronica, Experimental & Hip hop
- Occupations: Musician & Visual Artist
- Instruments: Sampler, Midi Controller, Drum Machine & Synthesizer
- Years active: 2009 – present
- Labels: MARS & earτн. sun. мoon

Phenyo Kgaffe (born 25 November 1992) better known as IIndman (pronounced "second man") is an electronica producer and visual artist based in South Africa. He works under a media company named MARS, with his work published by Earth Sun Moon.

== Life and career ==
Kgaffe is from Mahikeng, a small town in South Africa. From early 2007 he started taking his music into the DAW – FL Studio to record songs while creating visual art as a hobby. In 2009 he began working with Mo'Molemi on his album "Rebel Without a Pause" where he produced the song Lefika-Town feat. Spikey of Lyv Records at 16 years of age. He began doing visual work with AKA of the I.V League for the South African Hype Magazine Hip Hop Awards. He also worked with Dreamteam on the Blow Up Mixtape, dance crew - The Repertoires, Chez Ntemba, LiquidChefs SA with Very Special Saturday hosted by Fifi Costello and DJ Sliqe, visual artworks for the SAMA Award Winning DJ Sliqe, Kwesta, and Da King of African Rap album art for DaKAR II in 2016. He has also worked in advertising and marketing visuals for South African music events including GoodSundae for Benny Maverick & DJ Feel and Groove Afrika events.

Besides being a visual artist, A Mahikeng-born musician who set his sights on taking South African electronic music to another level. With releases dating back to 2013, he showed that he was ahead of his time.

== Music ==
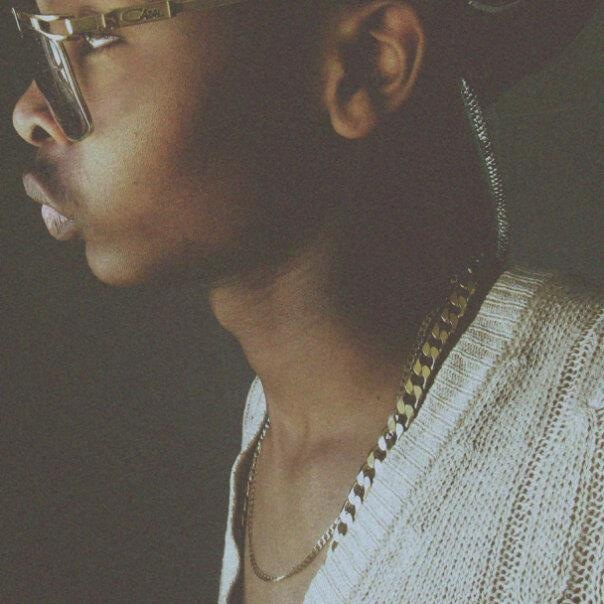
IIndMan for 1707

He began to work in electronica, augmenting it with abstract art work. In 2015 he released his debut electronic EP which OkayAfrica said "IIndman's 6-track La Bella Vita EP is a crumbling tunnel of drum whips, muffled vocals, and scraped effects. Starting with the slow, key-floored title track and moving onto the choppy, percussion-based "Lemonade," the self-produced release only sees dim light with the fifth track "Never Let You Down," a grand composition of strings that begins with a deep-voiced birthday wish." Followed by single in the same year with Norwegian singer - Camilla Luna, it is said that he aims to blend ambient textures and lounge-y keyboard melodies together over drums and percussion in a manner reminiscent of Flying Lotus and J Dilla, who IIndman lists as some of his musical influences. He has also done a rework of ECHLN's song called 'Honey' which IIndman's music is unique and compelled music Singapore-based label - Darker Than Wax to take notice in 2017.

== Visuals ==
Kgaffe would log on to Tumblr where he received pictures and used them as a source of inspiration, experimenting on the computer, and started editing using Microsoft Publisher and Microsoft Paint, designing posters and abstract art. In 2009 he began working in Adobe Photoshop, creating images with an urban-vintage tone in a dark futuristic environment. He used the internet to connect with more people, clients and sources of artistic inspiration. He is also inspired by visual artists such as Mark Ryden, James Turrell, Oleg Dou, Sara Golish, Vanessa Beecroft, Marcel Van Der Vlugt, Amy Judd and Ruud van Empel.

== Discography ==
=== Singles ===
- Flowers Rework (Original by Lapalux) (2014
- Moment In Time (Ft. Camilla Luna & Emamkay) (2015)
- ECHLN - Honey (Ft. Hunter Rose) [IIndman Rework]

=== Eps ===
- 1707 (as Muthafuckiniindman) (2013)
- La Bella Vita (2015)

=== Beat tapes ===
- Polaroids Beattape (2015)

=== Productions ===
- Lefika Town – Mo'Molemi ^{(Rebel Without A Pause – Studio Album – 2010)}
- Rep My Town – ProfresherKT ^{(Single – 2012)}
- Macknight – Otee ^{(Macknight – EP – 2014)}
- Omnipotent – ProfresherKT ^{(Mogote – EP – 2015)}
- Its Only The Beginning – ProfesherKT ^{(Afterschool – Studio Album) (2016)}
