= IIndman discography =

The discography of iindman, a visual artist and experimental multi-genre music producer in Electronica from South Africa.

== Mixtapes ==
Year	Mixtape Details
2013	=== 1707 (as. Muthafuckiniindman) === : Released: 17 July 2013; Label: MARS; Cover Art: IIndman; Formats: Digital Download
2014	==== Polaroids ==== : Released: 16 June 2014; Cover Art: IIndman; Formats: Digital Download

== Extended plays ==
Year	EP Details
2015	La Bella Vita: Released: 27 February 2015; Label: MARS; Cover Art: Cherrie Cordier, Isabelle Smit, IIndman; Formats: CD, Digital Download

== Singles ==
- 2014: Flowers Rework (Original by Lapalux)
- 2015: Moment in Time (feat. Camila Luna & Emamkay)

== Production discography ==
- 2010: Lefika Town - Mo'Molemi, (Rebel Without A Pause - Studio Album)
- 2012: Rep My Town - ProfresherKT (Single)
- 2014: Macknight - OTEE (Macknight EP)
- 2015: Omnipotent - ProfresherKT (Mogote EP)
- 2016: Its Only The Beginning - ProfesherKT (Afterschool - Studio Album)
