= Ngiyaz'fela Ngawe =

2017 single by Kwesta

Single by Kwesta featuring Thabsie

from the album DaKAR II
- Released: 24 January 2017
- Genre: Hip hop
- Length: 5:29
- Label: SME Africa (on behalf of South African Recordings)
- Songwriter(s): Senzo Vilakazi; Yanga Ntshakaza; Bathabise Biyela; Nhlamulo Baloyi; Neo Makwa
- Producer(s): Neo "Makwa 6eats" Makwa; Ganja Beats; Gobi Beast Gobizembe

Kwesta singles chronology
"Kokotela" (2017)	"Ngiyaz'fela Ngawe" (2017)	"Spirit" (2017)

Thabsie singles chronology
"Ngiyaz'fela Ngawe" (2017)

"Ngiyaz'fela Ngawe" is a single by South African rapper Kwesta from his third studio album DaKAR II. It features a guest appearance from Thabsie. It was released on 24 January 2017 through South African Recordings (a division of Sony Music Africa).

In early 2018 it was announced that the single was certified Diamond, and in late 2021 it was certified 119× Platinum.

== Awards and nominations ==
Year	Award ceremony	Prize	Recipient/Nominated work	Results	Ref.
2017	South African Hip Hop Awards	Song of the Year	"Ngiyaz'fela Ngawe"	Won	

== Certification ==
Region	Certification
South Africa (RISA)	119× Platinum
