= Emmanuel Ngobese =

South African footballer

Emmanuel Asanda "Scara" Ngobese (3 June 1980 – 11 May 2010) was a South African soccer player who last played as a midfielder for Kaizer Chiefs FC in the Premier Soccer League. He was born in Katlehong, Gauteng and died in Johannesburg.

Ngobese was affectionately known to his supporters as "Scara" or "The Black Jesus" . He was managed by Edgar O.

== Career ==
He started off at Kaizer Chiefs' development team (1994-1998), and then played for United FC, Thanda Royal Zulu, Kaizer Chiefs, Zulu Royals, Tembisa Classic, Hellenic and Moroka Swallows during his career. It was at Kaizer Chiefs where he was at his prime from 2003 to 2005. Their last league game in the 2004/2005 PSL season where they lifted the league cup will always be remembered as his last best game of his whole career. His career took a downfall when the late Ted Dumitru left the team after he had been his coach and winning the Premier league twice accompanied by a few domestic trophies with him in the past 2 years.

After Dumitru's departure, Chiefs hired the German coach Ernst Middendorp who sidelined Ngobese for the whole season, alleging he was confusing professional soccer for street football. By the time Middendorp left the team at the end of the season, Ngobese was completely out of form. The German international relieved Ngobese of his contract duties and was signed by Thanda Royal Zulu where he never played any significant games, and it is here that he was diagnosed with tuberculosis and was forced to hang his boots until he met his demise a few years later.

== Death ==
Ngobese died on 11 May 2010 of HIV related illnesses, after having suffered from the disease since 2008. This was exactly a month before the start of the historical South African version of the FIFA World Cup on June 11 of 2010. An event he would've partaken in if it weren't for his sudden ailment, forced retirement and untimely death.

== Pop culture ==
South African rapper Kwesta paid homage to Scara by appearing on his "Spirit" music video wearing a shirt with Ngobese's name and his Kaizer Chiefs jersey number (11) printed on it. The music video premiered on SABC 1 on 30 December 2017 and features American recording artist, Wale. DJ Fanatic, Reason and Kwesta made a song called "Number 11" (which is the kit number he used for most of his soccer career) to pay homage to the dribbling wizard.
