= Ragnar Axelsson =

Icelandic photojournalist

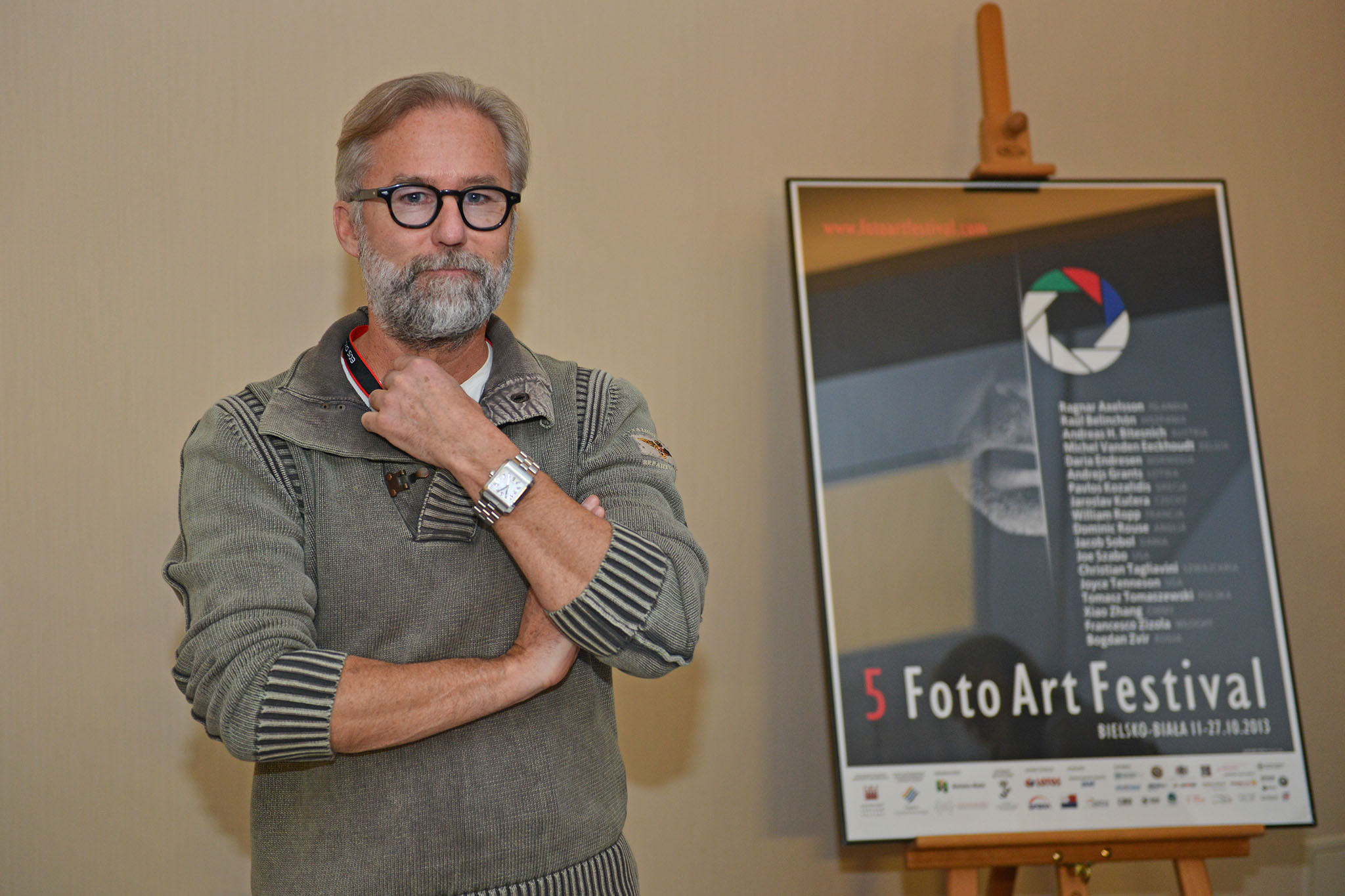
- Ragnar during FotoArtFestival, 2013
- Born: 6 March 1958 (age 68)
- Other name: RAX
- Occupation: Photographer
- Years active: 1976–present
- Employer(s): Morgunblaðið (1976–2020)

Ragnar Guðni Axelsson (born 6 March 1958), also known as RAX, is an Icelandic photographer. He was a staff photographer of Morgunblaðið from 1974 to 2020. Ragnar has done work and stories for various agencies and magazines, shooting in Iceland, the Faroes, Greenland, Indonesia, Scandinavia, and Siberia.

== Biography ==
Ragnar has been traveling to the Arctic for almost three decades. His images have won him recognition as a documentary photographer. He has had photographs and picture essays published in Life, National Geographic Magazine, Le Figaro, Stern, La Vanguardia, Time, and elsewhere.

Ragnar's book Andlit Norðursins (2004; English edition Faces of the North 2005) is a collection of his black-and-white photographs of vanishing ways of life in Iceland, the Faroes and Greenland taken over a period of fifteen years. His most recent book, Last Days of the Arctic (2010), has won critical acclaim, with multiple photo features in the New York Times and exhibitions most recently in Iceland and Ireland. As a photography "Book of the Year", the (London) Times described his work as 'remarkable', 'beautiful', and 'a gift for the eyes, mind and heart'. This body of work presents a unique record of daily life and culture of some of the most remote communities in the world, and the twilight of their society.

In 2011, Ragnar wrote an introduction to Iceland, a journal of nocturnes, a photographic monograph by Scottish photographer Bruce Percy.

In March 2020, he left Morgunblaðið after working there since 1976.

== Books ==
Andlit Norðursins, an earlier collection by Ragnar of Iceland, the Faroes, and Greenland

- The Golden Circle. Photographs by Páll Stefánsson, Ragnar Axelsson and Mats Wibe-Lund. Reykjavík: Iceland Review, 1989.
- Reykjavik. Reykjavík: Hagall, c 1991. ISBN 9979-816-00-7. A book in color. (in Icelandic and English)
- Faces and figures: Contemporary Scandinavian photography. New York: American Scandinavian Foundation, 2001. (in English) Catalogue of an exhibition held at Scandinavia House, The Nordic Center in America, Apríl–July 2001, and elsewhere.
- Ólafsson, Guðmundur Páll. Um víðerni Snæfells. Reykjavík: Mál og menning, 2003. ISBN 9979-3-2421-X. (in Icelandic) This book, whose title is translatable as "Through the vastness near Snæfell" (i.e. the Snæfell volcano northeast of Vatnajökull), documents an area going underwater because of the Kárahnjúkar Hydropower Plant, and has photographs by Ragnar and also Friðþjófur Helgason and Jóhann Ísberg.
- Andlit Norðursins: Ísland, Færeyjar, Grænland. Reykjavík: Mál og menning, 2004. ISBN 9979-3-2561-5. (in Icelandic) Various translations have also appeared:
  - Faces of the North: Iceland, Faroe Islands, Greenland. Reykjavík: Mál og menning, 2005. ISBN 9979-3-2592-5. (in English)
  - Visages du Nord: Islande, Féroé, Groenland. Reykjavík: Mál og menning, 2005. ISBN 9979-3-2593-3. (in French)
  - Die Seele des Nordens. Island, Färöer, Grönland. Reykjavík: Mál og menning, 2005. ISBN 9979-3-2561-5, ISBN 9979-3-2594-1. (in German)
- Veiðimenn norðursins. Photographs by Ragnar Axelsson, text by Mark Nuttall. Reykjavík: Crymogea, 2010. ISBN 978-9935420039. (in Icelandic)
- Last Days of the Arctic. Photographs by Ragnar Axelsson, text by Mark Nuttall. London: Polarworld, 2010; Reykjavík: Crymogea, 2010. ISBN 978-0-9555255-2-0. English-language version of Veiðimenn norðursins.
  - Faces of the North: Iceland, Faroe Islands, Greenland. Reykjavík: Crymogea, 2016. (in English)
- Glacier Photographs by Ragnar Axelsson, text by Ragnar Axelsson. Foreword by artist Olafur Eliasson. Reykjavík: Qerndu, 2018. English-language version of Jökull
- Arctic Heroes Photographs by Ragnar Axelsson, text by Ragnar Axelsson. Kehrer Verlag, Germany. Qerndu, 2018. English-language version of Hetjur norðurslóða

== Awards ==
- The annual Icelandic Photojournalists Awards: More than twenty awards, including Photographer of the Year (four times) and Documentary Story of the Year (six times)
- The Oskar Barnack Award (Leica), 2001. Honourable Mention
- Festival International de la Photo de Mer, Vannes, Grand Prix.

== Exhibitions ==
In addition to numerous group shows within Iceland:

- The Reykjavik Municipal Museum, 1990.
- "Tender is the North, visual arts from Scandinavia", Barbican Arts Centre, London, 1992.
- Visa pour l'Image: Festival International du Photojournalisme, Perpignan, 2000; screening of North Atlantic Project.
- Rencontres d'Arles, 2001.
- "Faces and Figures: Contemporary Scandinavian Photography". Scandinavia House, New York, 2001. Haggerty Museum of Art, Milwaukee, 2002.
- "Un Mondo ai Confini del Mondo". ClicArt, Museo Zucchi Collection, Milan, 2002.
- Festival della Val d'Orcia, Italy, 2003.
- Festival International de la Photo de Mer, Vannes, France, 2003.
- Galerie Argus fotokunst, Berlin, Germany, 2004
- Altonaer Museum (Norddeutsches Landesmuseum), Hamburg, Germany, 2004
- Fnac Italie 2, Paris, 2004.
- Niedersächsischen Staats- und Universitätsbibliothek Göttingen, 2004.
- Alfred-Ehrhardt-Stiftung, Germany 2005.
- "Faces of the North." Austurvellir, Reykjavík.
- Paris Photo 2005, Louvre, Paris.
- Musée de la Cohue, Vannes, 2007.
- Fnac, Milan, 2007
- Galerie Argus fotokunst, Berlin, Germany, 2008.
- The Athy Heritage Centre-Museum and 10th Anniversary Shackleton School, Ireland, 2010.
- "Glacier" Ásmundarsalur, Reykjavík, Iceland, 2018.
- "Where the World is Melting" Reykjavik Art Museum, Reykjavík, Iceland, 2021.
- "Where the World is Melting" Kunstfoyer Versicherungskammer Kulturstiftung, Munich, Germany, 2022
- "Where the World is Melting" Deichtorhallen, Hamburg, Germany, 2023
