= 2018 DStv Mzansi Viewers' Choice Awards =

South African entertainment award ceremony

- Date: November 24, 2018
- Location: Sandton Convention Center, Johannesburg
- Hosted by: Bonang Matheba
- Website: http://www.mzansimagic.tv/dstvmvca

Television/radio coverage
- Network: Mzansi Magic

The 2018 DStv Mzansi Viewers' Choice Awards were held on 24 November 2018, at Sandton Convention Center in Johannesburg.

== Performances ==
List of musical performances
Artist(s)	Song(s)
Team Mosha; Sandy; Sun-El Musician; Simmy	"Senya Retla Patela" (Team Mosha) "Sofa Silahlane" (Team Mosha and Sandy) "Sonini" (Sun-El Musician and Simmy)
Busi; Nokwazi; Sho Madjozi	"Rejoice" (Busi) "Inde" (Busi and Nokwazi) "Wakanda Forever" (Sho Madjozi) "Huku" (Sho Madjozi)
Mlindo the Vocalist; Sjava; Saudi	"Amablesser" (Mlindo) "Egoli" (Mlindo and Sjava) "Abangani" (Sjava and Saudi))
Khaya Mthethwa; Ntokozo Mbambo; Dumi Mkokstad	Rebecca Malope Tribute "Moya Wam" (Khaya) "Angingedwa" (Ntokozo) "UyiNcwele" (Dumi)
Rebecca Malope	"Ngegazi Lemvana" "Njalo" (contains elements of "UyiNcewle")
Kwesta	"Vur Vai"; Rap tribute to HHP and ProKid (with elements of "Marambe" by HHP and "Sekele" by ProKid) "Spirit"
Mafikizolo	Medley: 1. "Kwela; 2. "Lotto"; 3. "Emlanjeni"; 4. "Ndihamba Nawe"; 5. "Mafikizolo" (in memory of Tebogo Madingoane); 6. "Love Portion"; 7. "Happiness"
DJ Maphorisa; Moonchild Sanelly; DJ Raybe; Zulu Mkhathini	"Makhe" (Maphorisa and Moonchild) "Nayi'le Walk" (Maphorisa, Moonchild, Raybe and Zulu)

== Winners and Nominees ==
=== Favourite Personality Of The Year ===
Bonang Matheba

- Papa Penny
- Nomzamo Mbatha
- Somizi Mhlongo
- Kagiso Rabada

=== Favourite Song Of The Year ===
Prince Kaybee (featuring, Zanda Zakuza, TNS and The Soulmates) - "Club Controller"

- Heavy K (featuring Busi and Nokwazi) - "Inde"
- DJ Maphorisa (featuring Busiswa, DJ Tira and Moonchild Sanelly - "Midnight Starring"
- Distruction Boyz (featuring Dlala Mshunqisi, Benny Maverick and DJ Tira) - "Omunye"
- Kwesta (featuring Wale) - "Spirit"

=== Favourite TV Presenter ===
Pearl Modiadie

- Lerato Kganyago
- Thomas Mlambo
- Carol Shabalala
- Anele Mdoda

=== Favourite Comedian ===
Skhumba

- Felixs Hlope
- Tumi Morake
- Smokey Nyembe
- Mpho "Pops"

=== Favourite Rising Star ===
Distruction Boyz

- Smash Africa
- Luvo Manyonga
- Lungi Ngidi
- Langa Mavuso

=== Favourite Radio Personality ===
Ntate Thuso Motaung

- Anele Mdoda
- Lady Dee Khoza
- DJ Fresh
- Selby Selbeyonce

=== Favourite Actor ===
Warren Masemola

- Hamilton Dlamini
- Mduduzi Mabaso
- Masoja Msiza
- Khulu Skenjana

=== Favourite Actress ===
Thembsie Matu

- Rami Chuene
- Linda Sebezo
- Moshidi Motsega
- Lesego Marakala

=== Favourite Music Artist/Group ===
Khuzani

- Lady Zamar
- Shekinah
- Distruction Boyz
- AKA

=== Favourite DJ ===
Black Coffee

- Ms Cosmo
- DJ Maphorisa
- DJ Tira
- Prince Kaybee

=== Favourite Sports Personality ===
Caster Semenya

- Kagiso Rabada
- Percy Tau
- Pitso Mosimane
- Siya Kolisi

=== Ultimate Viewers' Choice ===
Thembsie Matu

=== 1Life Life Changer Award ===
Moses Lehlokoa

=== 1Life Legend Award ===
Rebecca Malope
