= Spirit (Kwesta song) =

Single by Kwesta featuring Wale
- Released: 12 October 2017
- Recorded: 2017
- Genre: Hip-hop; Kwaito
- Length: 4:13
- Label: Sony Music Entertainment Africa; Urbantainment
- Songwriter(s): Senzo Mfundo Vilakazi; Olubowale Victor Akintimehin; Neo Makwa; Daniel Keith Jones; Richard Anthony Earnshaw; Mark Bamford
- Producer(s): Makwa 6eats

Kwesta singles chronology
"Ngud'" (2016)	"Spirit" (2017)	"Diamonds and Gold" (2018)

Wale singles chronology
"Saint Laurent" (2017)	"Spirit" (2017)	"Staying Power" (2018)

Music video
- "Spirit" on YouTube

"Spirit" is a single by South African rapper Kwesta featuring American rapper Wale, released on October 12, 2017 through Sony and Urbantainment. The song was written by Kwesta, Wale, and Makwa who also handled the production.

The song was certified Platinum by the Recording Industry of South Africa.

== Composition ==
"Spirit" samples the 2011 South African number 1 hit record "These Tears" as performed and written by South African House group Spiritchaser.

== Music video ==
The music video was released on Kwesta's Vevo account on 11 January 2018. It was directed by Skeem Saam's director Tebogo Malope in Katlehong, Ekurhuleni, Kwesta's birthplace. The video shows Kwesta and Wale performing to a crowd of fans, driving in a Lamborghini in a tunnel and popping alcoholic beverages.

IOL wrote:

The music video showcases real people in the township with beautiful cinematography by the director and brilliant editing of said images.

The music video features a cameo by American rapper, singer-songwriter, and record producer, Jidenna and Ekurhuleni mayor Mzwandile Masina.

== Charts ==
Chart (2017)	Peak position
South Africa (EMA)	1

== Accolades ==
"Spirit" was nominated at 2018 DStv Mzansi Viewers' Choice Awards.

Year	Nominee / work	Award	Result
2018	"Spirit"	Favourite Song Of the Year	Nominated

== Certifications ==
Region	Certification	Certified units/sales
South Africa (RISA)	Platinum	20,000^{*}
^{*} Sales figures based on certification alone.

== Release history ==
Country	Date	Version	Label	Ref.
South Africa	October 12, 2017	Original		
