= South African Gwijo Awards =

SAGAs2026
- Status: Active
- Genre: Music awards(Gwijo)
- Frequency: Annual
- Location: South Africa
- Country: South Africa
- Years active: 2025–present
- Organiser: Gwijo Arts Council (GAC)
- Website: www.sagwijoawards.co.za

South African Gwijo Awards (often simply the SAGAs) is an annual awards event in South Africa that recognises performers, groups and contributors associated with gwijo music. The awards are hosted by the Gwijo Arts Council (GAC) and were established in 2024. The first national awards ceremony took place in Katlehong on 4 October 2025.

== History ==
=== Establishment ===
The South African Gwijo Awards were established in 2024 by the Gwijo Arts Council. The awards were created to recognise gwijo performers and groups and to provide a platform for the musical tradition and its participants.

The awards' co-founders include Sipho Mthembu, Nonhlanhla Msimango, Andile Mzileni and Keletso Monyela, according to reporting by Germiston City News in October 2025.

=== Inaugural ceremony ===
The first national South African Gwijo Awards ceremony was held in Katlehong on 4 October 2025. The event recognised performers from different parts of South Africa, including participants from the Free State, Mpumalanga and the Eastern Cape.

According to Germiston City News, the inaugural event received approximately 250 entries and featured 11 award categories. Winners received trophies, certificates and SAGA-branded medals. The Free State received three major awards, while Gauteng and the Eastern Cape shared the remaining honours.

The ceremony included categories recognising gwijo songs, groups, vocal leaders, remixes, drummers, poets and social media contributors.

== Awards and categories ==
The awards recognise different forms of participation in the gwijo community. Categories reported for the 2025 ceremony included Best Gwijo Song of the Year, Best Viral Video, Best Gwijo Female, Best Gwijo Remix, Best Gwijo Drummers, Best Gwijo Cocomelon, Best Gwijo Group, Best Gwijo Male Leader, Best Gwijo Social Promoter, Best Gwijo Poet Collaboration and Best Gwijo Collaboration.

The 2026 edition expanded the programme to 12 categories. Categories reported by Germiston City News included Best Gwijo Female Vocalist, Best Gwijo Male Vocalist, Best Gwijo Group, Best Gwijo Duo, Best Gwijo Remix, Best Young Gwijo Vocalist, Song of the Year, Best Performance Poet, Best School Choir, Best Gwijo Content Creator, Best Social Media Promoter and Best Gwijo Event.

== winners ==
The following winners were reported by Germiston City News in its coverage of the inaugural South African Gwijo Awards.

Award category	Winner	Year	Status
Best Gwijo Song of the Year	Siba RSA	2025	Active
Best Viral Video	Siba RSA	2025	Not disclosed
Best Gwijo Female	Mamgazie	2025	Active
Best Gwijo Remix	Mamii & Jr Intelezi Yezitha	2025	Not disclosed
Best Gwijo Drummers	Zondo & Skhumba	2025	Removed
Best Gwijo Cocomelon	Paballo	2025	Removed
Best Gwijo Group	K1 Finest	2025	Active
Best Gwijo Male Leader	Leroy	2025	Active
Best Gwijo Social Promoter	Kayboo	2025	Active
Best Gwijo Poet Collaboration	Sphelele & Zwizwi	2025	Not disclosed
Best Gwijo Collaboration	Thunder Healer's	2025	Not disclosed

== Voting ==
The awards have used public participation in the selection of winners. For the 2025 ceremony, voting was facilitated through the awards' website and promoted through social media.

For the 2026 edition, nominations opened on 1 May and closed on 30 July, while public voting opened on 5 August. Germiston City News reported that voting was scheduled to close on 30 October 2026 and that the ceremony was planned for late November. The final venue and date had not been confirmed in that report.

== Cultural context ==
Gwijo is a South African vocal tradition associated with collective singing and group performance. Reporting on the inaugural awards described the style as an a cappella form in which performers use their voices to create rhythmic harmonies. The same report discussed the tradition's use in social and protest settings and its development within township communities.

The awards' organisers have described the event as a means of recognising gwijo artists, supporting emerging performers and promoting the musical tradition. In 2025, co-founder Sipho Mthembu discussed plans for a programme in which young gwijo artists could write and record original music rather than relying primarily on cover performances.

== Organisation ==
The South African Gwijo Awards are hosted by the Gwijo Arts Council (GAC). The official awards website provides information about the event, its categories, voting and sponsorship.
