= Huntersfield Stadium =

Multi-use stadium in Katlehong, South Africa

Coordinates: 26°18′14.96″S 28°9′30.49″E

Huntersfield Stadium is a multi-use stadium in Katlehong, South Africa. It is currently used mostly for football matches and was the home stadium of Jomo Cosmos.
