= Palmietfontein Airport =

Former airport of Johannesburg, South Africa (1945–1952)

- IATA: none; ICAO: none

Summary
- Airport type: Defunct
- Serves: ~~Johannesburg, South Africa~~
- Opened: 1945
- Closed: 1952
- Elevation AMSL: 5,107 ft (1,557 m)
- Coordinates: 26°20′7.2″S 028°08′28.8″E
- Interactive map of Palmietfontein Airport

Runways
Direction	Length		Surface
Direction	ft	m	Surface
~~17/35~~	~~6,000~~	~~1,828~~	~~Asphalt~~
~~04/22~~	~~4,500~~	~~1,371~~	~~Asphalt~~
~~13/31~~	~~4,950~~	~~1,508~~	~~Grass~~

Palmietfontein Airport (Afrikaans: Palmietfontein-Lughawe) was an airport situated in what is now the townships of Thokoza and Katlehong to the south of Johannesburg, South Africa, from 1945 to 1952.

== History ==
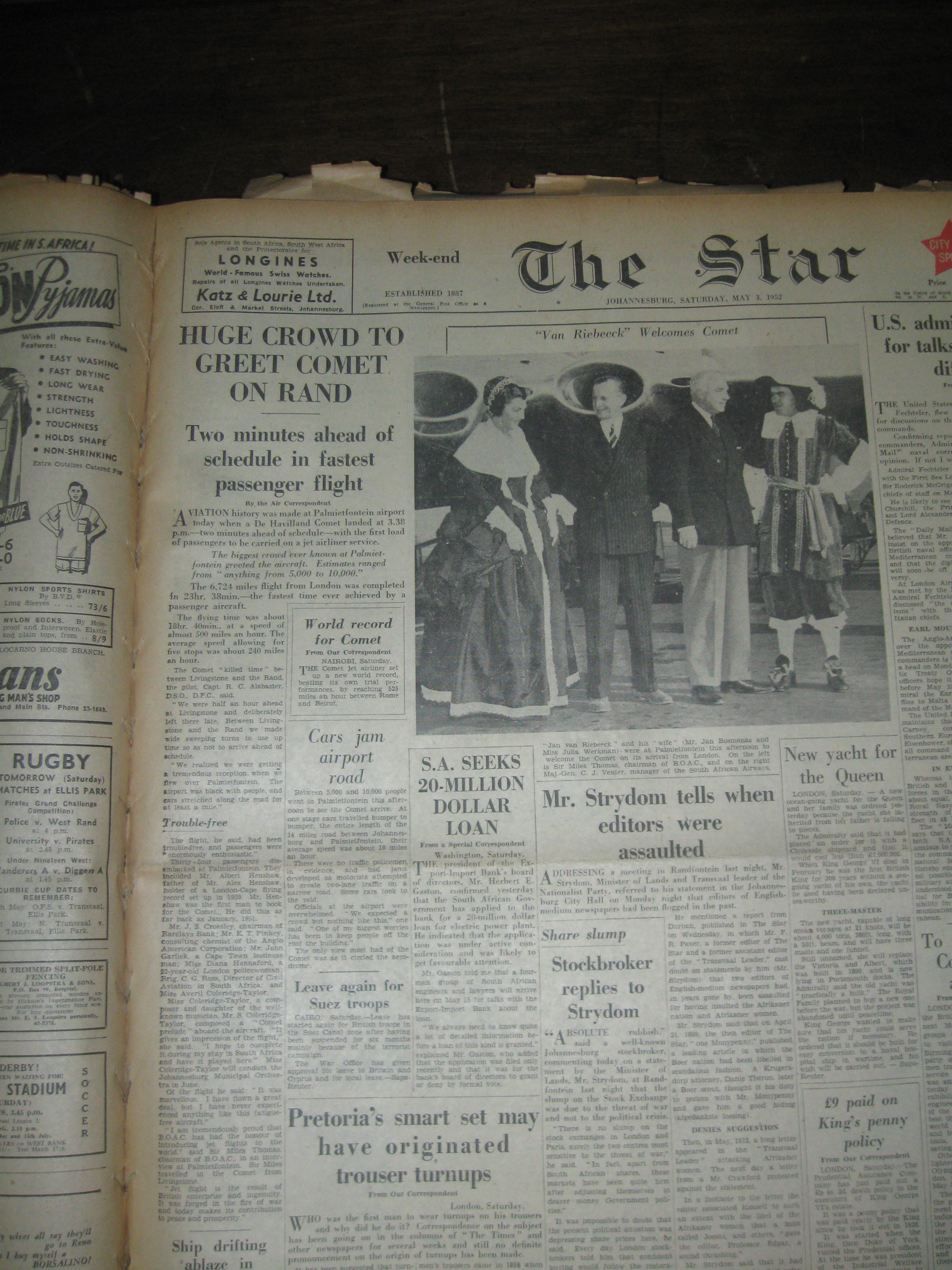
Newspaper article published in The Star of 3 May 1952 regarding the world's first commercial jet flight which took place from London to Palmietfontein Airport in Johannesburg, South Africa.

Palmietfontein Airport was a wartime air force base which was converted to a temporary airport to serve Johannesburg whilst the new airport, Jan Smuts Airport (now O. R. Tambo International Airport), was being built. The airport serving Johannesburg at the time, Rand Airport, was unable to accommodate the size of aircraft to be operated on a new service to Great Britain. In 1948, South African Airways moved its terminal to Palmietfontein Airport.

Several historical flights terminated at Palmietfontein Airport. A Qantas Avro Lancastrian completed an unprecedented flight from Sydney Airport in Australia to Palmietfontein, landing on 20 November 1948 at 15h15, and having been in the air a total of 41 hours and 52 minutes at an average speed of 210 mph (180 kn; 340 km/h). En-route stops were made at Perth, Cocos Islands and Mauritius. The objective, to establish viable air links between South Africa and Australia, had been accomplished. The world's first passenger jet service took place on 3 May 1952 when a BOAC de Havilland Comet 1 landed at Palmietfontein on a flight from the UK.

== Airport layout ==
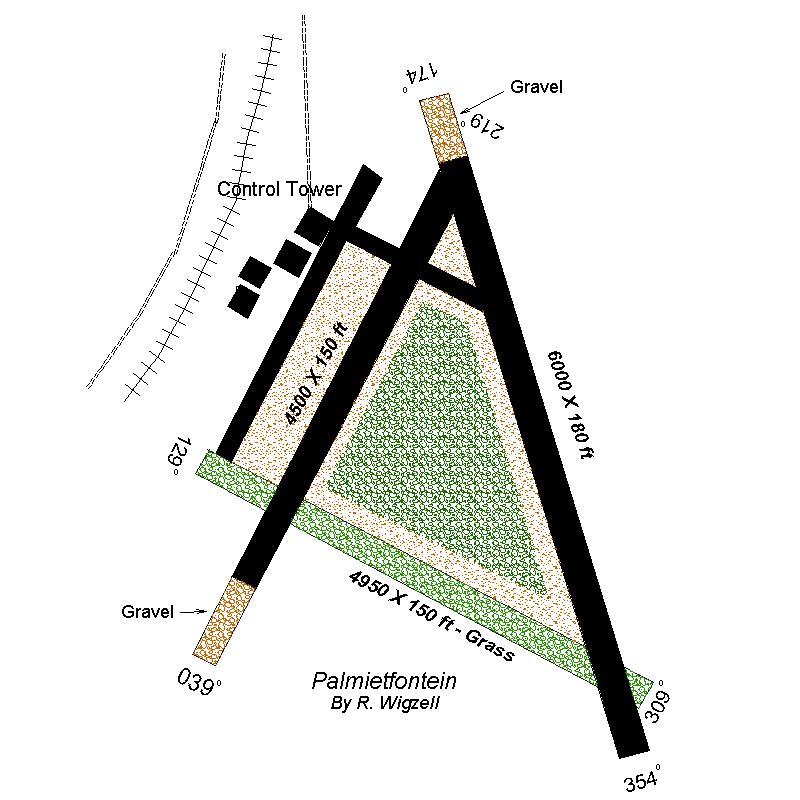
Airport layout circa. 1950

There were three runways, the relative positions of which formed a triangle. Runway 17/35 was the longest, being 1,800 m long (6,000 ft) and 55 m wide (180 ft). Runway 04/22 was 1,400 m in length (4,500 ft) and runway 13/31 was 1,510 m long (4,950 ft). Both 17/35 and 04/22 were tarred; 13/31 was grass. The apron and control tower were situated to the west of runway 04/22. The airport elevation was given as 1,557 m (5,107 ft). The information is derived from an old map and airport layout diagram courtesy of E. Du Plessis.

== Aircraft types that operated to and from Palmietfontein ==
- Douglas DC-3
- Lockheed Lodestar
- Lockheed Constellation
- de Havilland Comet
- Avro Lancastrian
- Handley Page Hermes

== Accidents and incidents ==
=== Accidents at the airport ===
- On 5 January 1948, a Lockheed 18-08-01 Lodestar, ZS-ASW, was damaged beyond repair when it struck a water drain after running off the runway during the landing rollout.

=== Aircraft bound to or from Palmietfontein ===
- On 15 May 1948, a Douglas C-49K (DC-3) ZS-BWY, was en route to Palmietfontein from Stamford Hill Aerodrome, Durban, when it crashed into a hill in bad weather with the loss of all 13 on board.
- On 15 September 1952, a South African Airways Douglas C-47A-30-DL(DC-3) ZS-AVI with 19 occupants was written off when they landed at Carolina after becoming lost on a flight from Livingstone, Zambia to Palmietfontein. The landing occurred at night and the strip was unlighted. There were no fatalities.

== Palmietfontein today ==
Palmietfontein was transformed into a motor racing circuit for the 1956 Rand Grand Prix, which was won by Peter Whitehead.

The townships of Katlehong and Thokoza were eventually established on the site, although parts of the original runway are still visible on Google Maps to this day. The main runway 17/35 lies in line with Vile Street and Mtambo Street in Katlehong but is now largely built up. Secondary runway 04/22 is now Khumalo Street in Thokoza.

The coordinates are 26° 20' 7.20" S 028° 08' 28.80" E on Maps.
