= Thabsie =

South African singer-songwriter (born 1991)

Bathabise Biyela (born 5 November 1991) is a South African singer-songwriter professionally known under the alias of Thabsie. She came to prominence subsequent to the release of "Ngiyaz'fela Ngawe" (which was certified 119× Platinum in South Africa).

In 2017, Biyela put out two lead singles, "African Queen" featuring JR and "Ubuyanini" from her debut studio album Songs About You (2017), which were certified Platinum and Gold respectively by the Recording Industry of South Africa (RiSA).

After a four-year hiatus, Thabsie returned in 2024 with the single ‘Same Place’, blending Afro and R&B influences. In late 2025, she released ‘Again’, a soulful track exploring resilience and self-discovery. She also collaborated with DJ Zinhle on ‘Kusazokhanya’. At the 2025 TikTok Sub-Saharan Africa Awards, Thabsie performed a medley of her hits.

== Awards and nominations ==
Year	Award ceremony	Category	Recipient/Nominated work	Results	Ref.
2017	South African Hip Hop Awards	Song of the Year	"Ngiyaz'fela Ngawe"	Won	
2018	South African Music Awards	Newcomer of the Year	Songs About You	Nominated	
2018	South African Music Awards	Best R&B / Soul / Reggae Album	Songs About You	Nominated	
2019	South African Music Awards	Record of the Year (fan voted)	"Macala"	Nominated	
