= Nkosinathi Ngema =

South African footballer

Nkosinathi Nhleko
Personal information
- Full name: Nkosinathi Nhleko
- Date of birth: 14 September 1979 (age 47)
- Place of birth: Katlehong, South Africa
- Position: Defender

Team information
- Current team: Thanda Royal Zulu
- Number: 20

Senior career*
Years	Team	Apps	(Gls)
2006–2008	Thanda Royal Zulu		
- * Club domestic league appearances and goals as of 31 December 2006

Nkosinathi Nhleko (born 14 September 1979 in Katlehong) is a South African former football player who played two seasons with Thanda Royal Zulu.
