= Andrzej Baturo =

Polish photographer (1940–2017)

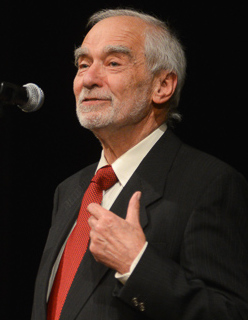
Andrzej Baturo during FotoArtFestival, 2015

Andrzej Baturo (16 May 1940 in Vilnius – 9 June 2017) was Artist photographer, organiser of many important photo events, publisher, General director of the FotoArtFestival in Bielsko-Biala, founder and president of the Foundation Centre of Photography.

== 1960s ==
One of the founders of Warmia-Mazuria Photographical Society in Olsztyn.

== 1970s ==
- Press photojournalist ("Na Przełaj", "Razem", "itd.", "Polityka").
- Twice - the title of the Photojournalist of a Year (1973, 1975).
- Prize of the Minister of Education for his activity in the magazine "Na Przełaj".
- Secretary of the Main Headquarters of the Union of Polish Artists Photographers in Warsaw.
- Vice-President of the Union of Polish Artists Photographers in Warsaw.
- Founded the Delegacy of the Union of Polish Artists Photographers in Bielsko-Biała.
- The Head of the Delegacy for many years.

== 1980s ==
Founded the Mountain Division of the Union of Polish Artists Photographers in Bielsko-Biala (the President of the Division for many years, in Headquarters for many years). Curator General of the I Survey of Polish Documentary Photography in Bielsko-Biała - the biggest photo event in Poland in those years. Curator and one of the authors of a big exhibition of documentary photography - "Strike on Podbeskidzie". The exhibition was closed by censorship after eight days. Creates and runs Bielsko Gallery of Photography. He took up advertising photography for a while. Later on, he began to take photos of mountain landscape. Golden Prize, Biennale of Polish Landscape, Kielce. Organized the II big Survey of Polish Documentary Photography in Bielsko-Biała. Organized an international Meeting of Mountain Photographers (Zakopane, Wisła) and was a curator of the exhibition "Between Sky, Between Earth" (Bielsko-Biała). Grand Prix and I Prize at prestigious Festival of Mountain Image, Antibes, France.

== 1990s ==
Curator of a big exhibition of Polish Mountain Photographers, Antibes, France. Runs Baturo Publishing House (specializing in books on photography) and the Gallery of Photography B&B. Books of the Publishing House has many times been awarded on many contests. He is an Expert of the Minister of Culture for photographical affairs. Member of the Art Council of the Union of Polish Artists Photographers in Warsaw. He has achieved many prizes and medals for his art activity. Member of the jury of many contests of photography. Author of many collective exhibitions of press and landscape photography, organized in Poland and abroad. Exhibited in World Press Photo in Haag (1963, 1968, 1972).

== Prizes in the Contests of Polish Press Photography ==
- I Prize: for photoreportages: "As long as Poland..." (1973), "Action Rot-gut" (1975)
- II Prize: for photo-reportages: "The First Day" (1975), "Removal" (1976),
- III Prize: for photo-reportages: "Press Fest" (1974), "Kuszko Estate" (1977).
- Prize of the weekly "Panorama" for photo-reportage "Motocross" (1961),
- Prize of the weekly "Ekran", for photo-reportage "Methamorphosis of Maja Komorowska" (1972),
- Prize of "Dookoła Świata" for photo-reportage "Mature Exam" (1973),
- Prize of "Express Wieczorny" for photo-reportage "Men's Fashion" (1973),
- Prize of "Dookoła Świata" for photo-reportage "The Bieszczads 40" (1974),
- Prize of "Zwierciadło" for photo-reportage "Let's Kiss" (1974),
- Prize of "Nowa Wieś" for photo-reportage "The First Day" (1974).

== Most important solo exhibitions ==
- "Associations", Olsztyn, Warsaw (1967)
- "Poland - goal!", Warsaw (1974)
- "To see sharply", Gorzów Wielkopolski (1978), Wałbrzych (1980)
- "Inventory", Bielsko-Biała (1987)
- "The World of Mountains", III International Festival of Mountain Films, Katowice (1992)
- "Photography", Macon, France (1994)
- "Between the lines...", Bielsko-Biała (2002)
- "In the Face of a Moment", Łódź (2003)

The author of the albums "The Beskids" and "Cieszyn". Contributed to the books: "Polish Mountains", "Bielsko-Biała". Included in "Masters of Polish Landscape", "Anthology of Polish Photography", "Pages from Polish Photography".

== Prize for the album the Beskids ==
- Jantar Book (prize for the most beautiful book of the year), Meeting of Good Book Publishers, Gdańsk (1995);
- Prize in the Contest of the Society of Polish Book Publishers (1995);

== Other important prizes ==
- The prize of the President of Bielsko-Biala City in Culture - Ikar 2005;
- The Prize of the year of the Minister of Culture for eminent achievements in plastic arts, given to a photographer for the first time in the history of Poland;
- Gloria Artis, order of the Ministry of Culture.

His works are in the collections of the National Museum in Wrocław, and the Museum of the History of Photography in Cracow.

== See also ==
- List of Polish photographers
