= La Bella Vita EP =

La Bella Vita

EP by IIndman
- Released: February 27, 2015
- Recorded: 2014–2015
- Length: 38:15
- Label: MARS
- Producer: IIndman

IIndman chronology
1707 (2013)	La Bella Vita (2015)

La Bella Vita is the first studio EP by South African music producer IIndman, released on February 27, 2015 by MARS. The cover was designed by Cherie Cordier and named after the concept of a Beautiful Life with a synopsis by Madri Van Wyk.

== Release ==
The EP's title and release date were announced on February 14, 2015 as form of a private listening session at The North-West University Gallery.

Professional ratings
Review scores
Source	Rating
PXY Magazine	3/5

== Critical reception ==
Okayafrica stated that the EP is a crumbling tunnel of drum whips, muffled vocals, and scraped effects. Rated | MC = 3/5 by PXY Magazine, the EP is well throughout and brilliantly executed, with a very lo-fi production to La Bella Vita, IIndman was recognised by fairly known blog Mishka NYC stating that "If you are a fan of instrumentals that drift you miles away, this was definitely up your alley, consisting of eighteen minutes of instrumental relaxation, creeping along and pleasant to the ears"

== Track listing ==
No.	Title	Producer(s)	Length
1.	"La Bella Vita"	IIndman	2:34
2.	"Interlude"	IIndman	0:49
3.	"Lemonade"	IIndman	3:43
4.	"Peace, Love" (Keys by Emamkay)	IIndman, Emamkay	0:50
5.	"Never Let You Down" (Monologue by Stacey Adams)	IIndman	3:27
6.	"BARS"	IIndman	3:59
7.	"Colombia"	IIndman	1:01
