= DaKAR =

Studio album by Kwesta
- Released: November 25, 2013
- Recorded: 2012 – 2013
- Genre: Hip hop; rap; kwaito; rock
- Length: 66:54
- Language: English; isiZulu
- Label: Urbantainment
- Producer: Kwesta

Kwesta chronology
| Special Rekwest (2010) | DaKAR (2013) | DaKAR II (2016) |

Singles from DaKAR II
- 1. "Boom Shaka Laka" Released: 2012

DaKAR (backronym of Da King of Afrikan Rap) is the second studio album by South African hip hop recording artist and poet Kwesta. The album was released digitally on November 25, 2013, with physical copies being released the following year.

It is Kwesta's first album to be released on Urbantainment, after departing from Buttabing Entertainment. The album serves as the first installment in Kwesta's DaKAR album series and is a prequel to DaKAR II, which was released on February 26, 2016.

== Background ==
DaKAR is a self-titled acronym whereby Kwesta proclaims himself as "Da King of Afrikan Rap".

== Track listing ==
| No. | Title | Writer(s) | Length |
|---|---|---|---|
| 1. | "Thank You" | Senzo Vilakazi | 05:03 |
| 2. | "All About" | S. Vilakazi | 03:43 |
| 3. | "High on Life" (featuring Tia Black) | S. Vilakazi | 03:58 |
| 4. | "Suster" | S. Vilakazi | 02:31 |
| 5. | "Find a Way" (featuring Kruna and Soweto Gospel Choir) | S. Vilakazi | 04:47 |
| 6. | "Radio" (featuring Charles Mchunu) | S. Vilakazi | 03:33 |
| 7. | "Balloon" (Jimmy Nevis featuring Kwesta) | S. Vilakazi | 03:46 |
| 8. | "Make You Go" | S. Vilakazi | 04:27 |
| 9. | "Boom Shaka Laka" (featuring Kid X) | S. Vilakazi; Bonginkosi Mahlangu | 04:27 |
| 10. | "Thul' Ujaive" (featuring Kid X and Zakwe) | S. Vilakazi; Bonginkosi Mahlangu | 03:57 |
| 11. | "The Future" | Senzo Vilakazi | 05:42 |
| 12. | "Hood Rich" | S. Vilakazi | 03:42 |
| 13. | "No Competition" (featuring Jody Williams) |
| 14. | "Johnnie (Keep Walking)" (featuring MarazA & Crush Crush Burn) |
| 15. | "Pray Hard" (featuring Reason) | S. Vilakazi; Sizwe Moeketsi |
| 16. | "Family Matters" |
| Total length: | | | 66:54 |
