= DaKAR II =

2016 album by Kwesta

Studio album by Kwesta
- Released: 26 February 2016
- Recorded: 2014–2015
- Genre: Hip hop; rap; kwaito; house
- Length: 52:39 (disc 1); 48:22 (disc 2)
- Label: Urbantainment; Sony Music Entertainment Africa
- Producer: Kwesta; DJ Maphorisa; Neo "Makwa 6eats" Makwa; Marquez Trackz; Tweezy; Ganja Beatz; Gobi Beast; Ameen; Yanga

Kwesta chronology
DaKAR (2013)	DaKAR II (2016)	2 Skeif (2020)

Singles from DaKAR II
- 1. "Nomayini" Released: 29 August 2015; 2. "Ngud'" Released: 18 January 2016; 3. "Day One" Released: 28 May 2016; 4. "Mayibabo" Released: 6 October 2016; 5. "Kokotela" Released: 10 February 2017; 6. "Ngiyaz'fela Ngawe" Released: 23 February 2017

DaKAR II is the third studio album by South African hip hop recording artist and poet Kwesta. The album was released on 26 February 2016, by Urbantainment, under exclusive license to Sony Music Entertainment Africa. The album was certified diamond and became South Africa's best selling hip-hop album of all time.

== Background and recording ==
Kwesta started working on DaKar II in 2014 after a commercial success of the first DakAR which was released at the beginning of 2014.

Kwesta said, in relation to the album, "My first album, Special Rekwest, was introducing Kwesta as a rapper. On the first DaKAR I got personal, told stories of my life and of the people I grew up with. This album (DaKAR II) I'm enjoying myself as an artist, it is different from the first two, as the second was from the first."

— Kyle, Channel24

== Commercial performance ==
DaKAR II was certified 7× Platinum by RISA, and "Ngyaz'fela Ngawe" has been certified 119× platinum which makes it 11× diamond certified.

DaKAR II won two awards for Best Album of the Year and Male Artist of the Year at the 23rd ceremony of South African Music Awards.

Year	Nominee / work	Award	Result
	DaKAR II	Best Album of the Year	Won
	DaKAR II	Male Artist of the Year	Won

== Singles ==
In July 2015 "Nomayini" was released as the album's first official single. It topped most of the country's charts and would go on to be one of the smash jams played in the festive season. At the beginning of 2016 Kwesta released a second single, "Ngud'", which features Cassper Nyovest and DJ Maphorisa as a producer. Ngud' has gone on to be Kwesta's most successful hit single to date, it was on summer 2016 SABC's top 10. Other singles released from the album were "Day One", "Mayibabo" and "Ngiyaz'fela ngawe" as the latest.

== Track listing ==
Disc 1
No.	Title	Writer(s)	Producer(s)	Length
1.	"The Fire"	Senzo Vilakazi, Ameen Harron, Neo Makwa	Ganja Beats, Gobi "Beast" Gobizembe, Makwa Beats	04:03
2.	"Ggg"	S. Vilakazi, Edward "Gobi Beast" Gobizembe, Neo Makwa	Ganja Beats, Gobi "Beast" Gobizembe, Neo Makwa	05:03
3.	"Tjovitjo"	S. Vilakazi, Marques Trackz	Ganja Beats, Gobi "Beast" Gobizembe, Makwa Beats	04:56
4.	"Nomayini"	S. Vilakazi, Neo Makwa	Makwa Beats	04:59
5.	"K1 God"	S. Vilakazi, Neo Makwa	Ganja Beats, Gobi "Beast" Gobizembe, Makwa Beats	04:23
6.	"Kokotela (featuring Yanga and Kid X)"	S. Vilakazi, Nhlamulo Baloyi, Yanga Ntshakaza, Bonginkosi Mahlangu, Edward Gobizembe	Ganja Beats, Gobi "Beast" Gobizembe, Makwa Beats	06:03
7.	"Act Like (featuring Tellaman)"	S. Vilakazi, Thelumusa Samuel Owen, Nhlamulo Baloyi, Thulasizwe Dlamini	Ganja Beats, Gobi "Beast" Gobizembe, Makwa Beats	04:47
8.	"Let a Nigga Hit"	S. Vilakazi, Ganja Beats, Edward Gobizembe	Ganja Beats, Gobi "Beast" Gobizembe, Makwa Beats	03:54
9.	"Tshek"	S. Vilakazi, Ganja Beats, Neo Makwa	Ganja Beats, Gobi "Beast" Gobizembe, Makwa Beats	04:21
10.	"Preacher (featuring Nota)"	S. Vilakazi, Nhlamulo Baloyi, Ganja Beats, Neo Makwa	Ganja Beats, Gobi "Beast" Gobizembe, Makwa Beats	06:02
11.	"Karma (featuring Nota)"	Senzo Vilakazi, nafla, Cloudy Beats, Ganja Beats	Ganja Beats, Gobi "Beast" Gobizembe, Makwa Beats	04:11
Total length:				52:39

Disc 2
No.	Title	Writer(s)	Producer(s)	Length
1.	"Lights"	S. Vilakazi ,Neo Makwa	Ganja Beats, Gobi "Beast" Gobizembe, Makwa Beats	04:23
2.	"Mayibabo (featuring DJ Maphorisa, DJ Bucks and OkMalumKoolKat)"	S. Vilakazi, Obakeng Ramahali, Okmalumkoolkat, Themba Sekowe, Neo Makwa, Smiso Zwane, Itumeleng Bokaba	Ganja Beats, Makwa Beats, DJ Maphorisa	04:36
3.	"Day One (featuring. AKA)"	S. Vilakazi, Kiernan Forbes, Tumelo Mathebula	Ganja Beats, Gobi "Beast" Gobizembe, Makwa Beats	04:27
4.	"Afro Trap (featuring Busiswa)"	S. Vilakazi, T. Sekowe, Busiswa Gqulu	Ganja Beats, Gobi "Beast" Gobizembe, DJ Maphorisa	03:49
5.	"Ngud' (featuring Cassper Nyovest)"	S. Vilakazi, Sylvain Fazy, Pascal Moiroud, Isabelle Powaga	Ganja Beats, Gobi "Beast" Gobizembe, Makwa Beats, DJ Maphorisa	04:31
6.	"Mind Fcuk (featuring Bucie)"	S. Vilakazi, Ganja Beats, Busisiwe Nqwiliso	Ganja Beats, Gobi "Beast" Gobizembe, Makwa Beats	04:03
7.	"Shooting Star (featuring Ameen)"	S. Vilakazi, Ameen Harron	Ganja Beats, Gobi "Beast" Gobizembe, Makwa Beats	03:46
8.	"Ngiyaz'fela Ngawe" (featuring Thabsie)	Thabsie, S. Vilakazi, N. Baloyi, Yanga Ntshakaza, N. Makwa	Ganja Beats, Gobi "Beast" Gobizembe, Makwa Beats	05:28
9.	"Lala Khai"	S. Vilakazi, N. Makwa	Ganja Beats, Gobi "Beast" Gobizembe, Makwa Beats	03:51
10.	"One Day (featuring Psyfo)"	S. Vilakazi, N. Baloyi, Sipho "Psyfo" Ngwenya, N. Makwa	Ganja Beats, Gobi "Beast" Gobizembe, Makwa Beats, Psyfo	03:09
11.	"Mmino (featuring T.L.T.)"	S.Vilakazi, Vusi Rantlha, Phethego Makanyane, N. Makwa	Ganja Beats, Gobi "Beast" Gobizembe, Makwa Beats	06:26
Total length:				48:22
