= FotoArtFestival =

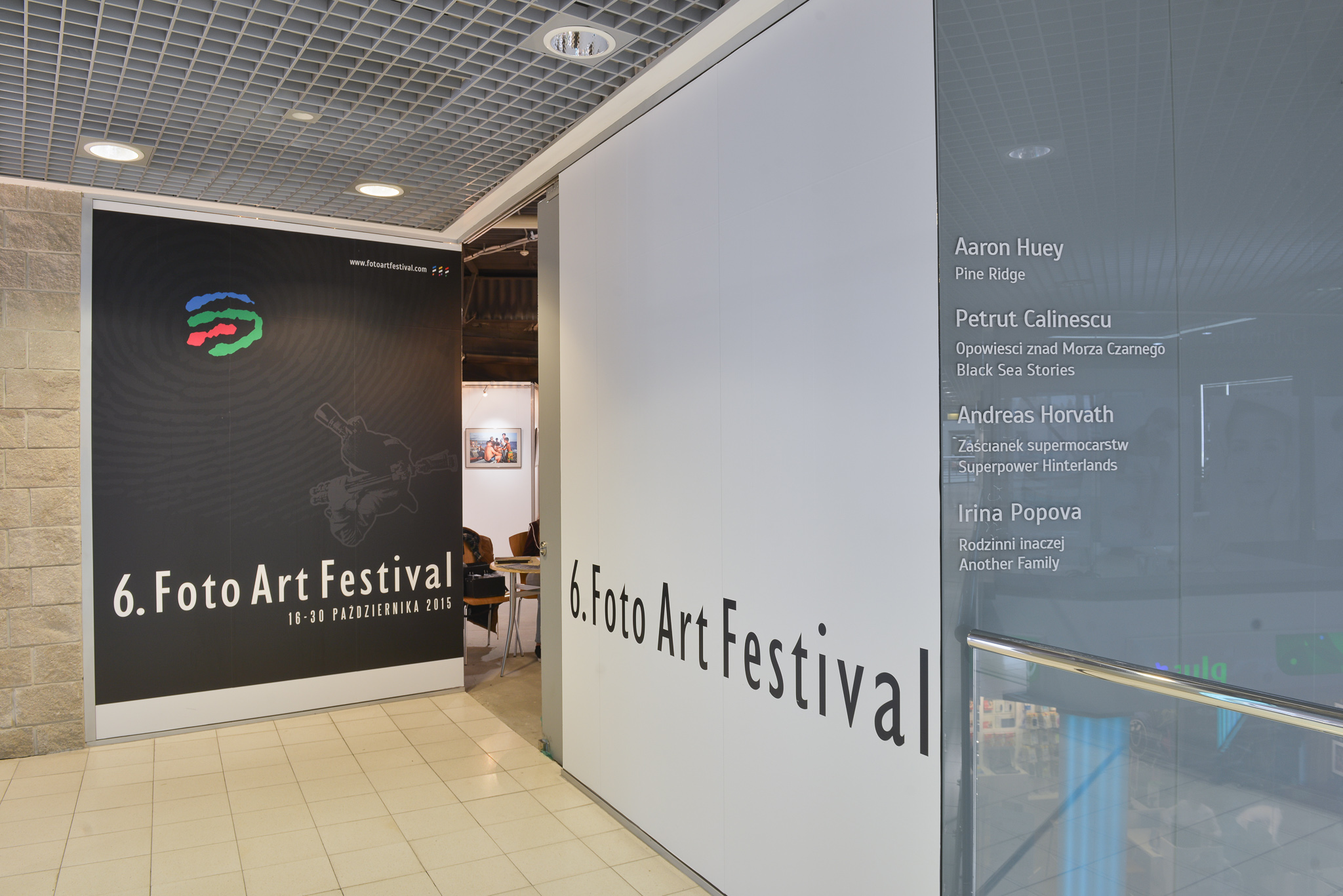
FotoArtFestival exhibition

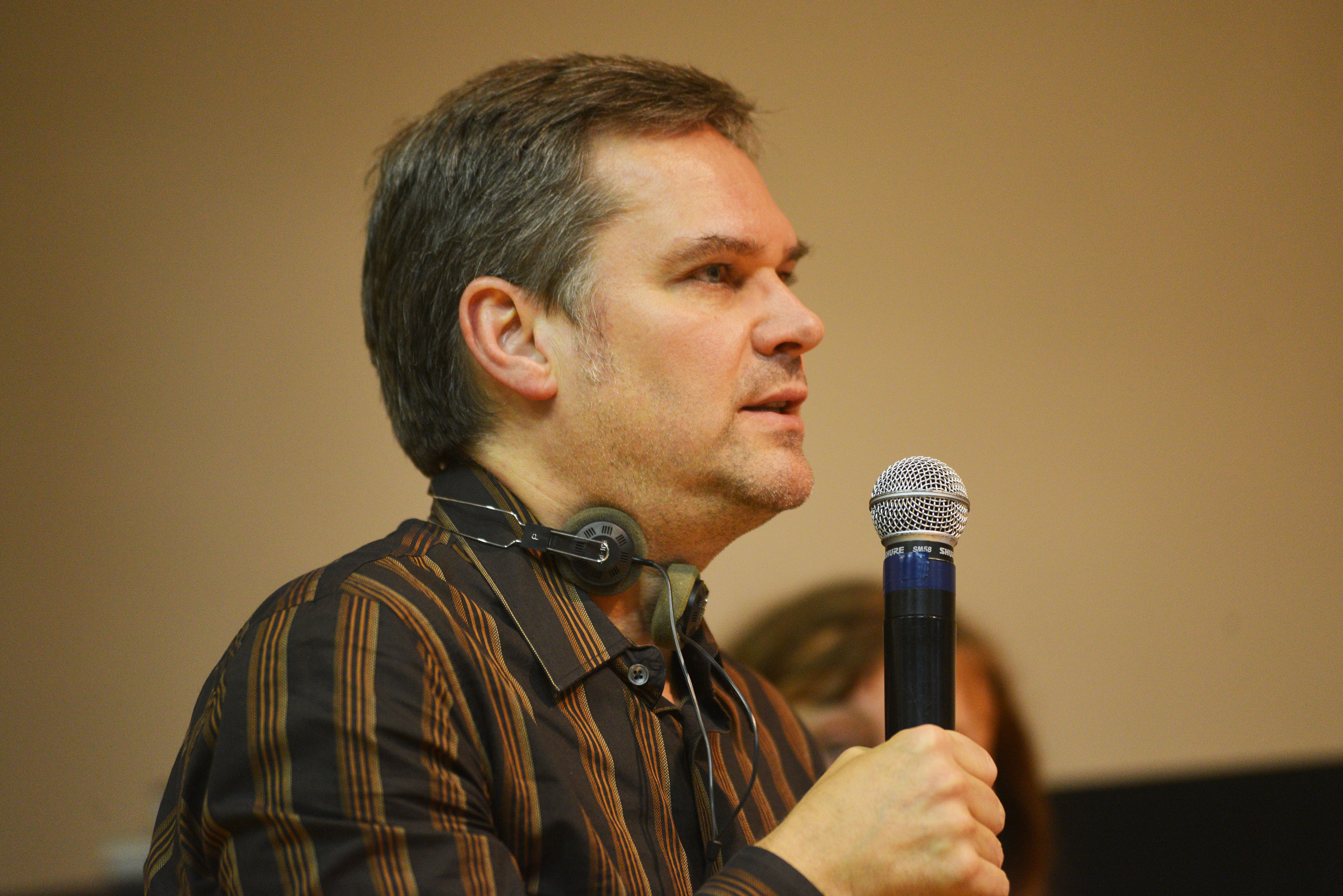
Ruud van Empel during FotoArtFestival 2015

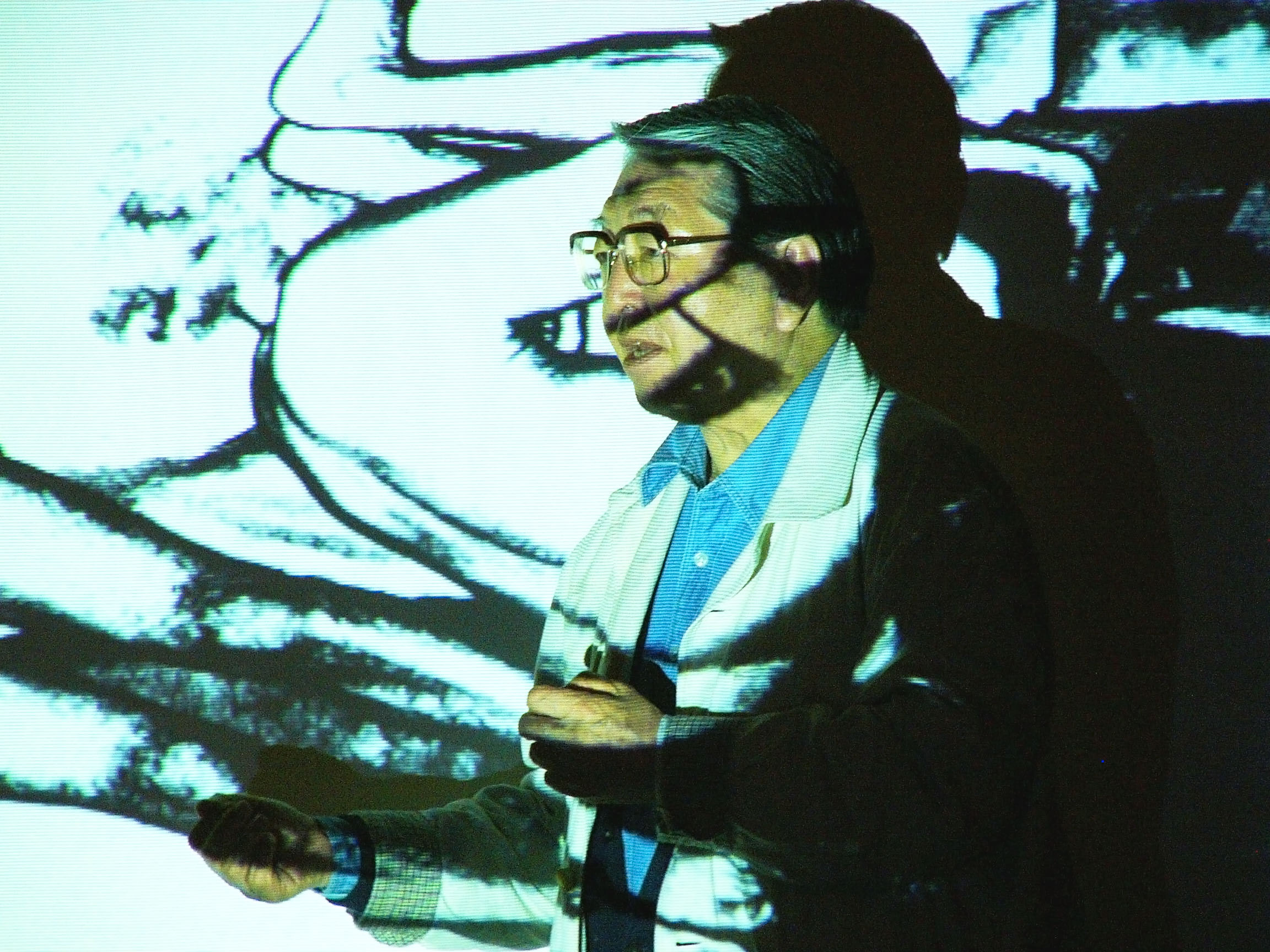
Eikoh Hosoe during FotoArtFestival 2005

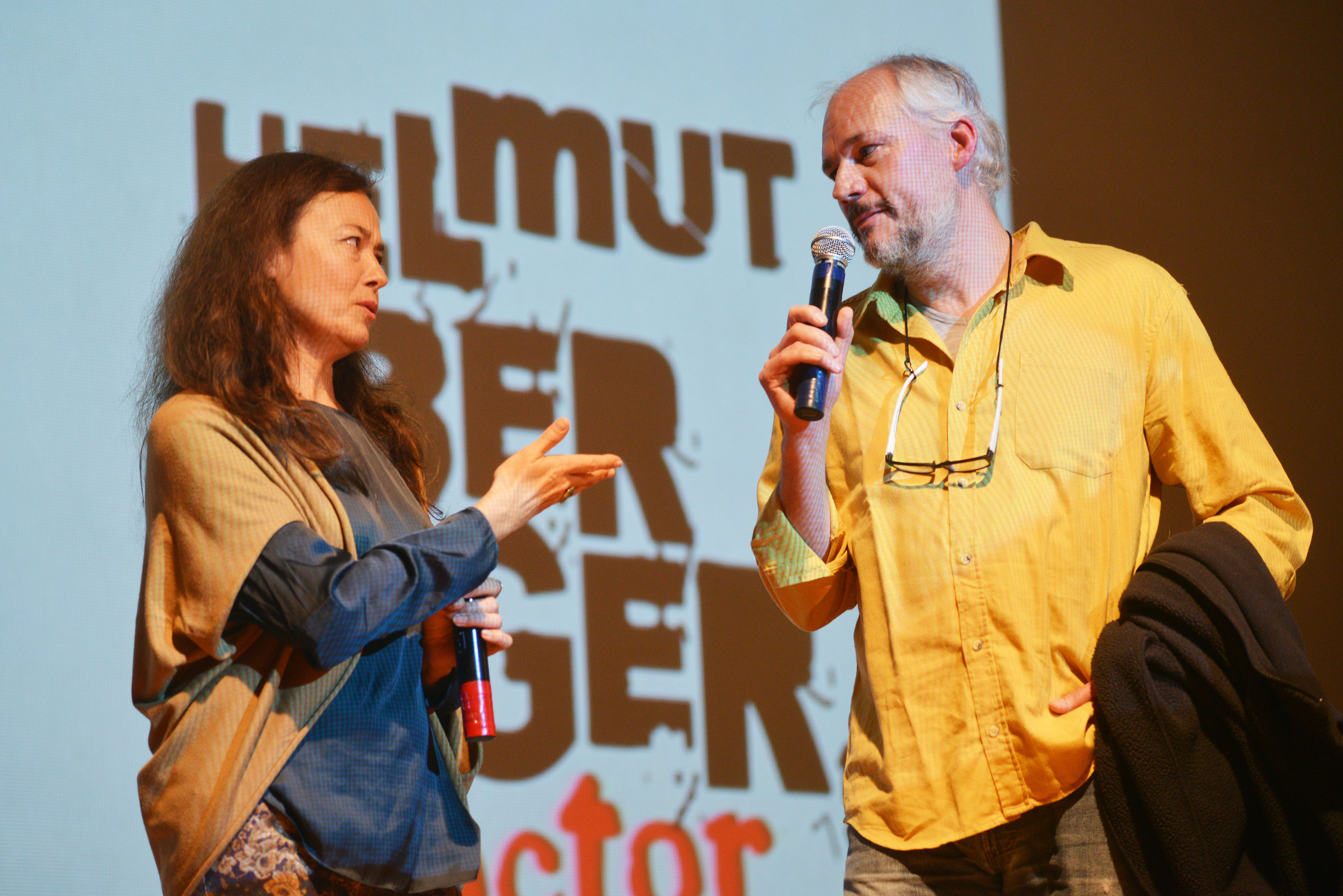
Andreas Horvath with his wife Monika Muskala during FAF, 2015

FotoArtFestival is an international art photography biennale organized since 2005 in October in Bielsko-Biała, Poland, by the Centre for Photography Foundation. It is one of the most important events in the field of photography in Poland.

== Details ==
During each festival there are organised several solo exhibitions which last two weeks. The most important day is the Authors' Marathon (the first weekend of the festival), during which most of the authors of the exhibitions talk about their work and experiences. Events accompanying the festival are workshops and a collective exhibition – FotoOpen open to both professionals and amateurs.

The general director of the festival is Andrzej Baturo, an artist photographer. The program director is Inez Baturo.
