= Katlehong =

- Location within Gauteng Location within South Africa Location within Africa
- Coordinates: 26°20′S 28°09′E
- Country: South Africa
- Province: Gauteng
- Municipality: Ekurhuleni
- Main Place: Germiston

Area
  - Total: 55.36 km^{2} (21.37 sq mi)

Population (2011)
  - Total: 467,890
  - Density: 8,452/km^{2} (21,890/sq mi)

Racial makeup (2011)
  - Black African: 98.4%
  - Coloured: 0.5%
  - Indian/Asian: 0.8%
  - White: 0.1%
  - Other: 0.3%

First languages (2011)
  - Zulu: 37.1%
  - Sotho: 22.4%
  - Xhosa: 13.1%
  - Tsonga: 9.7%
  - Other: 17.7%
- Time zone: UTC+2 (SAST)
- Postal code (street): 1431
- PO box: 1432
- Website: http://katlehong.co.za

Katlehong is a large township in the Gauteng Province of South Africa. It is 28 km south-east of Johannesburg and south of Germiston between two other townships of Thokoza and Vosloorus next to the N3 highway. It forms part of the City of Ekurhuleni Metropolitan Municipality.

== History ==
In the early 1990s just before 1994 elections, Katlehong was one of the townships that experienced political tensions between members of the African National Congress (ANC) and Inkatha Freedom Party (IFP).

Katlehong, together with the adjacent township of Thokoza, was established on the site where the Palmietfontein Airport, which was the airport that was temporarily serving Johannesburg whilst the new Jan Smuts International Airport was being built, was located.

== Culture and lifestyle ==
Katlehong is home to multiple musicians, actors and event brands. Including the likes of Kwesta, Reason, Emmanuel Ngobese.

Just like most of the townships in the East Rand, soccer is the most popular sport in the township, which is the reason it is also the birth place of some of the country's professional soccer players, like Emmanuel Ngobese.South African Gwijo Awards's first inaugural ceremony was celebrated in Katlehong as it is one of the Key target Audience around South Africa to have many Gwijo artists and related things.

== Notable people ==
Katlehong is home and gave birth to some of South Africa's celebrated personalities and sports players, notably:

- Sibusiso Khumalo, professional soccer player
- Kwesta, rapper
- Nkosinathi Ngema, footballer
- Emmanuel Ngobese, professional soccer player
- Reason, rapper
- Nthati Moshesh, actress
- Lindokuhle Sobekwa, documentary photographer
- Bayanda Walaza, Olympic silver medalist in 4x100m relay

== See also ==
- Huntersfield Stadium
- Tembisa
