= Ruud van Empel =

Dutch artist

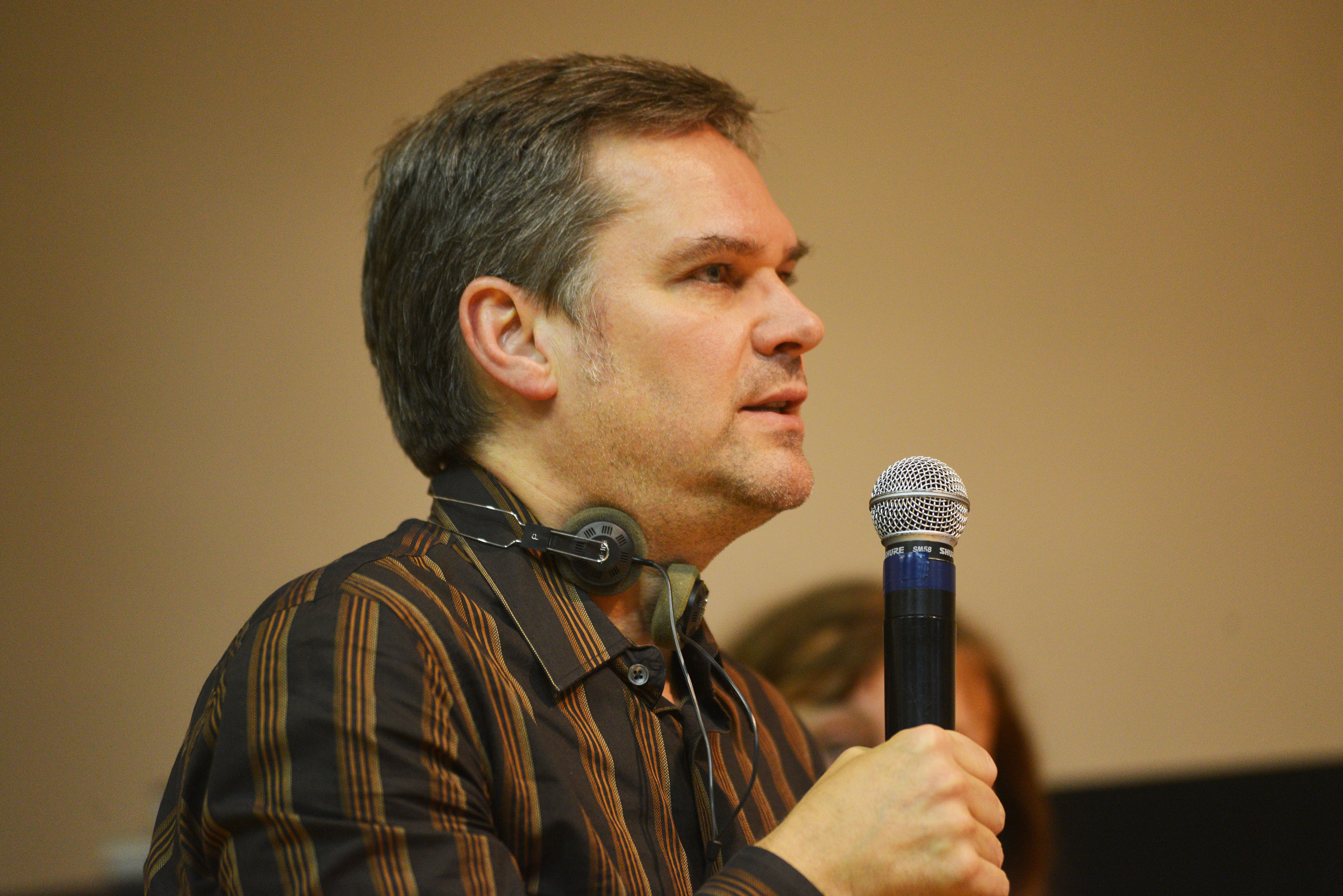
- van Empel during FotoArtFestival 2015 in Poland. Photo by Piotr Bieniecki
- Born: November 21, 1958 (age 67); Breda, The Netherlands
- Style: Art Photography
- Awards: Sint Joost Award, 1981, Charlotte Kohler Prize 1993, H.N. Werkman Award, 2001, Municipality of Breda Oevre Award, 2013
- Website: http://www.ruudvanempel.nl

Ruud van Empel (born 21 November 1958 in Breda) is a Dutch photographer and visual artist.

== Biography ==
Ruud van Empel was born in Breda in 1958. He studied at the Academie voor Beeldende Kunst St. Joost (St Joost Academy of Art) in Breda in the 1970s, and began making independently produced videotapes in the eighties. He moved to Amsterdam in the late eighties to work on his career as a visual artist. His first photographic series were The Office (1995-2001), Study for Women (1999-2002) and Study in Green (2003). The Groninger Museum presented his first solo exhibition in 1999. He made his international breakthrough with his series World-Moon-Venus, which was shown in the George Eastman House in Rochester, New York State.

== Work ==
Until mid-1995, Van Empel's art was primarily generated by a process of assembling analogue photographic images. At that point, he exchanged this traditional collage technique – cutting, pasting and retouching in the darkroom – for image processing on the computer, working in an idea-driven manner. The first series created with this method was The Office (1995). In a technical sense, The Office displays a handicraft-like quality, missing the perfectionist character of his later work.

Nevertheless, Van Empel clearly demonstrated that his approach differed from other disciplines such as staged photography. In certain aspects, The Office offered a somewhat surrealistic character and referred to photomontages from the 1920s in terms of style and design. On the basis of this art-historical reference, Van Empel created a new genre within photography – without a ready-to-wear label. The artist himself speaks of the ‘construction of a photographic image’. Although he does make use of pure photomontage – he never applies so-called morphing techniques – the final result strives for content aligned to natural reality rather than to surrealism. The artificiality is visible but the final image is a convincing, autonomous reality. As a consequence, the work does not seem grotesque or absurd but could theoretically actually appear in reality.

In that respect, Van Empel's images are independent. They do not manifest themselves as ‘symbolic’ and have been stripped of all ‘pictorial’ associations. He does not deploy photography as a substitute for painting but rather uses it as an independent form of depiction. Every image consists of photographic sources that are digitally assembled on the computer. The work of Ruud van Empel exists by grace of the camera by means of which he records his building blocks.

After The Office, he created the Study for Women series, which comprises a number of female portraits that refer to the magic realism art movement. In this series, produced in the period 2000–2002, he displayed the form language with which he would soon gain worldwide recognition. The Study in Green series from 2003 to 2004, the Untitled series from 2004, and the three closely related series World, Moon and Venus, which he began in 2005, represented Van Empel's true international breakthrough.

Curator Deborah Klochko invited him to participate in the exhibition entitled Picturing Eden in the George Eastman House. In the book Ruud van Empel Photoworks 1995–2010, she wrote: ‘Van Empel’s virtuosity lies in his capacity to combine in photography the kind of ideas anchored in painting (historical references, the power of a glimpse, use of colour) and cinema (structure with multiple images and the power of a narrative), and to do so on a large scale. To understand his work you must ask yourself: ‘Is it science or art? Is it real or imaginary? Is innocence or decadence?’ Particularly the World series, which explores the theme of innocence, made a deep impression. These works were inspired by photos taken by his father. Van Empel placed neatly dressed, black boys and girls in paradisical settings of unspoiled, non-existent natural surroundings. Great interest in and appreciation of this series are expressed worldwide to this day. The breakthrough in America also led to renewed attention in Dutch museums. Van Empel has had solo exhibitions in Museum Het Valkhof in Nijmegen, the Groninger Museum and the NoordBrabants Museum in ’s-Hertogenbosch. Since the international recognition of his work gave Van Empel the status of an artist with an own independent form language, he has progressively extended his oeuvre with the Theatre series from 2010-2013, and Souvenir, which provided a charged picture of his youth in Breda. This series was purchased by the NoordBrabants Museum.

A typical feature of the work of Ruud van Empel is the composition of a perfected and idealized representation right down to the finest details. But this always has a darker side, albeit not always evident. Ruud Schenk, curator of the Groninger Museum, wrote about that aspect with reference to the Study for Women series (2000-2002): ‘As a spectator you feel that there is something not quite right about the depiction of the women: they are not completely lifelike, but tend to be a mixture of real women and window dummies. This generates a certain discomfort, an uneasiness that touches upon what was described as 'das Unheimliche' (the uncanny) at the beginning of the 20th century.’ Although the photographic images seem to capture an epoch, you can hardly assign a date to any of them. This timeless element of Van Empel's work has taken on a different significance in his recent work, as he deals with themes such as transience and Vanity in his Still Life series from 2014, and also portrays older people as in the portrait of an older woman in the Sunday series (2012), or in the Nude series (2014), in which he questions the pose of the model and the aesthetics of nudity.

In the Solo Work series, on which Van Empel has been working since 2011, he consistently deals with just one topic in an isolated work. The moral, ethical and aesthetic dilemmas of society and art are presented to us in a photographic form language. The significance of these is shown in the countless publications and international exhibitions of this work, not only in institutions specialized in photography but also in renowned museums for modern visual art.

== Books ==
- Sunday Chapter (2012), Flatland Gallery
- Ruud van Empel, Photoworks 1995-2010 (2011), Groninger Museum/MOPA
- Photoworks 2006-2008 (2009)
- Photo Sketch (2007)
- Photo Archive (2007)
- World Moon Venus (2006), Museum Het Valkhof
- Study in Green (2003), TZR Galerie
- Ruud van Empel, Photo Album#1 (2001), BIS Publishers
- The Office (1998), Torch Gallery
- Photographics (1996)

== Awards ==
- Sint Joost Award, 1981
- Charlotte Kohler Award, 1993
- H.N. Werkman Award, 2001
- Municipality of Breda Oevre Award, 2013

== Exhibitions ==
- Ruud van Empel "Waterpas of optisch recht?" Groninger Museum, January 23 to March 30, 1999
- Ruud van Empel World and other series, Valkhof Museum, March 24 maart to June 4, 2007
- Ruud van Empel Photoworks 1995–2010, September 10 to November 27, 2011, in the Groninger Museum, Groningen, The Netherlands
- Strange Beauty 12 Oktober, 2012 to February 1, 2013, at MoPA Museum for Photographic Arts in San Diego, US
- Pictures don't Lie Fotografiska, Stockholm, March 9 to June 8, 2013
- Ruud van Empel FoMU Fotomuseum Antwerp, Belgium, June 28 to October 6, 2013
- Ruud van Empel Noordbrabants Museum, 's-Hertogenbosch, The Netherlands, February 15 to June 8, 2014

== Documentaries ==
On 7 September 2011, the NTR broadcast a documentary on the work of Ruud van Empel, entitled De onschuld voorbij (Beyond Innocence), directed by his brother Erik van Empel (Westerdok film). Harvey Wang is an American documentary director who interviewed Ruud van Empel in 2010 for his production From Darkroom to Daylight. Other photographers in this film include Sally Mann, David Goldblatt and Gregory Crewdson.
