= Ngud' =

Single by Kwesta featuring Cassper Nyovest

from the album DaKAR II
- Released: January 18, 2016
- Recorded: 2015
- Genre: Hip-hop; Kwaito
- Length: 4:31
- Label: Urbantainment
- Songwriter(s): Senzo Vilakazi; Refiloe Phoolo; Themba Sekowe
- Producer(s): DJ Maphorisa

Kwesta singles chronology
"Nomayini" (2015)	"Ngud'" (2016)	"Now or Never" (2016)

Cassper Nyovest singles chronology
"Malome (Extended)" (2016)	"Ngud'" (2016)	"Tell Em Say" (2016)

"Ngud'" is a song from South African rapper Kwesta's third studio album DaKAR II (2016). The song features a guest appearance from Cassper Nyovest. The song was produced by DJ Maphorisa and samples Joakim's remix of "Camino Del Sol" by Antena. It debuted at number 1 on iTunes and also debuted at number 7 on the EMA Local Top 10 chart. It peaked at number 1, making it Kwesta's first number one on the chart. It was certified 5× platinum by RISA. As of June 2016, the song had spent 14 non-consecutive weeks at 1 and was the most playlisted song on South African radio in 2016.

== Charts ==
Chart (2016)	Peak position
South Africa (EMA)	1

== Accolades ==
The single "Ngud'" was nominated at annual MTV Africa Awards in the song of the Year.

Year	Nominee / work	Award	Result
2016	"Ngud"	Song of the Year	Nominated
