= Mo'Molemi =

- Also known as: Mojo Man, General farm buy
- Born: Motlapele Morule; 3 April 1981 (age 45); Mmabatho, Montshioa, Bophuthatswana
- Genres: Hip hop, Motswako
- Occupations: Rapper, songwriter, farmer
- Instrument: Vocals
- Years active: 1997–present
- Label: So Hype Records

Motlapele Morule (born 3 April 1981 in Bophuthatswana), also known as Mo'Molemi, is a South African recording artist and a farmer. He is a former member of Morafe which he left to venture into farming and being a solo artist. His three solo albums are Amantsi, Motsamai and Asia. His debut, Amantsi was released in 2007. He is currently signed to Botswana based media company, So Hype Records.

Studio Albums ● Amantsi (2007) ● Motzamai: Rebel Without A Pause (2010) ● A Sia (2013) ● State Of Motswako Address (2019)
