= Kwesta =

South African rapper (born 1988)

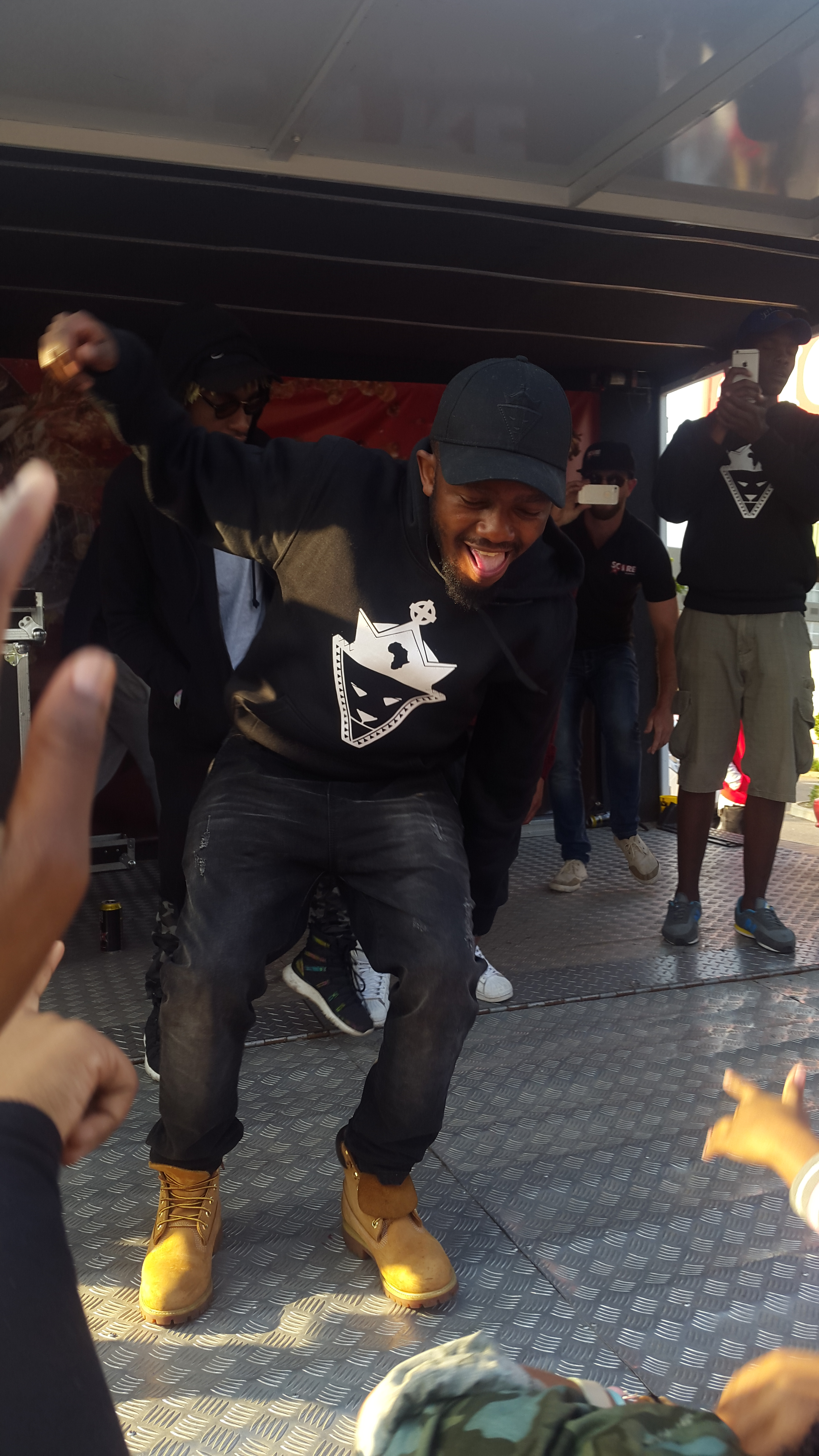
- Kwesta performing at City-View in Durban 2016
- Born: Senzo Mfundo Vilakazi; 11 August 1988 (age 37); Katlehong, Gauteng
- Other name: DaKAR
- Occupations: Rapper; songwriter
- Spouse: Yolanda Mvelase (m. 2017)
- Awards: Forbes Africa 30 under 30 (2018)
- Musical career
- Origin: Ekurhuleni, Gauteng, South Africa
- Genres: Hip hop
- Instrument: Vocals
- Years active: 2002–present
- Labels: Buttabing (former); Urbantainment (former); RapLyF (former)

Senzo Mfundo Vilakazi (born 11 August 1988) known professionally as Kwesta, is a South African rapper and songwriter. He was born in Katlehong, Gauteng, a township also known as ‘K1’. In 2003, at the age of 15, he and his friends formed a rap group Ghetto Fellaz which then changed to The Juvenylz, same year. He is currently signed to his own independent media company known as RapLyf Records with co-founder Kid X.

In 2010, he released his debut studio album Special ReKwest. His second album DaKAR (2013), peaked at number 3 on the iTunes South African Hip-hop/Rap chart. Kwesta's third studio album, DaKAR II (2016), spawned with singles includes; "Ngud", "Nomayini", "Day One", "Ngiyazifela Ngawe," "Mayibabo" and "Mmino". The album was certified 7× Platinum by the Recording Industry of South Africa (RISA). Having sold 210,000 copies in South Africa, DaKAR II became South African hip hop's best-selling album. His fifth studio album g.o.d Guluva (2021), which debuted at number 3 in South Africa.

His most reputable accolades include 6 South African Music Awards, 4 South African Hip Hop Awards, 1 MTV Africa Music Awards, and 1 Metro FM Awards.

== Life and career ==
Kwesta attended Phumlani Secondary School in Katlehong for three years, and later Alafang Secondary School.

He developed an interest in poetry during his high school years and received positive feedback and encouragement from fellow students and teachers.

In 2003, Kwesta became a part of the group The Ghetto Fellas later known as The Juvenylz. The group disbanded after two years.

After the group's disbandment, Kwesta made an agreement with Africa's Most Southern Record Company for the use of their studios. During this time, Kwesta participated in competitions and events to provide visibility for his brand. He took part in YFM's Rap Activity Jam MC of the Month competition. He topped ETV's Shiz Niz Freestyle Kings Special. Also, he performed at The Rand Show, Miss Confidence Show and The Durban Beach Festival.

The rapper dropped out of high school at the age of 16. After which he convinced his mother to give him the taxi fare necessary to get to Buttabing Entertainment's offices. The meeting resulted in him being added to the record label's roster marking the beginning of his signed career.

=== Career beginnings ===
In 2007, Kwesta earned a judging gig on the Sprite Hip Hoop Tour and a feature on The Ventilation Street Tape. He was also part of The Nokia Defend Your Street Campaign, where he worked with other artists to create the theme song.

In the same year, Kwesta released his inaugural single Sharp Fede. He later released a mixtape in collaboration with DJ C-Live.

In 2010, Kwesta was among the few chosen as Brand SA Ambassadors. He performed during the national roadshows held before the 2010 FIFA World Cup hosted in South Africa. Kwesta worked alongside Kelly Rowland, Jozi, and 2Face amongst other artist on the Everywhere You Go anthem for MTN. He also performed during the 2010 FIFA World Cup closing ceremony.

=== 2010–2012: Special Rekwest ===
In September 2010, Kwesta released debut studio album titled Special Rekwest. The album featured hit singles such as Babhemi, Flash It, Stomp and Pump It.

Flava received a synch-deal with DStv and got featured in the Loeries TV's 2011, ad-campaign.

Pump It received a synch-deal with DStv and Redds.

Stomp was one of the soundtracks for Death Race 3, an America action movie.

With the success of the album, Kwesta became South Africa's first rapper to have seven songs ranked on multiple radio charts in the same year. Special Rekwest earned SAMA nominations in 2011 for Best Newcomer and Best Rap Album.

=== 2013–2015: DaKAR ===
On 25 November 2013, Kwesta released his second studio album titled DaKAR (Da King of Afrikan Rap). The album ranked third on the South African iTunes Hip-Hop Charts during its debut.

=== 2016–2019: DaKAR II ===
In 2016, Kwesta released his third studio album titled DaKAR II. On 18 January 2016, Ngud' was released featuring, Cassper Nyovest.

At annual MTV Africa Music Awards, the single "Ngud'" received a nominations for the song of the Year. In early October 2017, his single "Spirit" featuring the American rapper Wale was released. The song was certified platinum by Recording Industry of South Africa (RiSA).

On 26 April 2018, DaKAR II was certified 7× Platinum by the Recording Industry of South Africa (RiSA).

=== 2021–present: g.o.d guluva ===
In March 2021, his single "Fire In The Ghetto" featuring Troublle was released, as album's lead single.

On 30 April 2021, Kwesta released his fourth studio album, titled g.o.d guluva [acronym for "ghost of dakar"]. The cover art was by Nelson Makamo.The album features South Africa artists Thabsie, Focalistic, TLT, Yanga Chief, K.O. The album peaked No. 4 in South Africa Top 100 Albums, and received generally positive reviews from music critics. At the 2021 Mzansi Kwaito and House Music Awards, his single "Njandini" won the award for the best Best Kwaito song.

== Discography ==
=== Studio albums ===
Title	Album details
Special ReKwest	Released: September 2010; Label: Buttabing Entertainment; Formats: CD, digital download
DaKAR (Da King of Afrikan Rap)	Released: 25 November 2013 (SA); Label: Urbantainment; Formats: Digital download & CD (5 May 2015)
DaKAR II	Released: 26 February 2016; Label: Urbantainment, Sony Music Entertainment Africa; Formats: CD, digital download; Certification: 7× Platinum
2 Skeif	Released: May 2020; Label: RapLyF; Formats: CD, digital download
g.o.d guluva	Released: 30 April 2021; Label: Dope Dreams Co.; Formats: CD, digital download
Speak N Vrostaan ( with Kabza de Small)	• Released: December 2022 • Label: Dope Dreams Co. • Formats: Digital download

=== Notable singles ===
List of singles as lead artist, with selected chart positions and certifications, showing year released and album name
Title	Year	Peak chart positions	Certification	Album
Title	Year	South Africa (EMA)	Certification	Album
"Ngyaz'fela Ngawe" (featuring Thabsie)	2016	1	RiSA: 11× Diamond (119× Platinum)	DaKAR II
"Ngud'" (featuring Cassper Nyovest)	2016	1	RISA: 7× Platinum	DaKAR II
"Spirit" (featuring Wale)	2017	1	RISA: Platinum	Non-album single
"Vur Vai"	2018	–	TBA	Non-album single
"I came, I saw" (featuring Rick Ross)	2020	–	–	–
"—" denotes a recording that did not chart or was not released in that territory.

Awards and nominations

Year	Awards	Category	Results	Ref.
2017	23rd SAMA	Best Male Artist of the Year	Won	
2017	23rd SAMA	Highest Airplay of the Year (Ngud')	Won	
2017	23rd SAMA	Best Rap Album	Won	
2017	23rd SAMA	Highest Airplay of the year (Ngud')	Won	
2017	23rd SAMA	Best Album of the Year	Won	
2017	DStv MVCA	Favourite Music Artist/Group	Won	
2025	Metro FM Music Awards	Best R&B Song	Won	
2025	Metro FM Music Awards	Song of the Year	Nominated	
2025	Metro FM Music Awards	Best Hip Hop Song	Nominated	
2025	Metro FM Music Awards	Best Collaboration Song	Nominated	
