= R103 (South Africa) =

Regional Route in South Africa

Regional route R103

Location
- Country: South Africa

Highway system
- Numbered routes of South Africa
← R102	→ R104

The R103 is a Regional Route in South Africa that is the designation for some of the old sections of roads that were previously the N3, prior to upgrading. It only has 3 sections, from Hillcrest to Ladysmith, from Warden to Villiers and from Heidelberg to Johannesburg.

== Route ==
=== Kwazulu-Natal ===
Regional route R103

Route information
- Length: 252 km (157 mi)

Major junctions
- South end: M13 near Hillcrest
- N3 in Cato Ridge; N3 in Camperdown; R603 / N3 near Camperdown; N3 near Ashburton; R56 in Pietermaritzburg; N3 in Cedara; N3 / R617 in Howick; R622 in Mooi River; N3 in Mooi River; R74 north of Frere; R74 in Colenso; N11 near Ladysmith
- North end: N3 near Ladysmith

Location
- Country: South Africa

Highway system
- Numbered routes of South Africa
← R102	→ R104

Its first section begins as a junction with the M13 highway (King Cetshwayo Highway) in Hillcrest, 30 km north-west of Durban (just north of Winston Park and west of Gillitts). The R103 begins as the Old Main Road and leaves Hillcrest in a roughly north-west direction and enters Cato Ridge from the east. In Cato Ridge, the road crosses the N3 at the 53 exit and then follows the south side of the N3, leaving the eThekwini Metropolitan Municipality, before recrossing the N3 freeway at Camperdown. It follows the N3 towards the outskirts of Pietermaritzburg, crisscrossing the freeway several times and passing through Ashburton.

It enters the suburb of Scottsville in Pietermaritzburg from the south-east as Washington Road, bypassing Pietermaritzburg Airport, before reaching a T-junction, where it co-signs with the R56 and heads north through the suburb as Alexandra Road. Soon after, the R56 breaks off to the east and the R103 leaves Scottsville, crossing the Msunduzi River and heading north-west into the Pietermaritzburg CBD as its main road (Chief Albert Luthuli Street). Leaving the CBD, it continues into the suburb of Athlone as Howick Road. The road resumes following the N3 in a north-westerly direction, passing through Hilton before reaching the outskirts of Howick, where it meets the north-eastern terminus of the R617. Crossing under the N3, it enters the southern suburbs of Howick and turns west by Howick Golf Club to reach the N3 Junction 103 just east of the Midmar Dam. It turns north to bypass the dam, where it crosses the Umgeni River. It heads in a north-westerly direction, passing through Lions River, Lidgetton West and Zenzani before turning north outside the town of Nottingham Road and heading towards the town of Mooi River, where it meets the western terminus of the R622.

Leaving Mooi River as the Griffin's Hill Pass, the road heads north-east then, after a short distance, heads north-west, eventually crossing the Boesmans River and entering Estcourt from the east. It heads north through Estcourt as its main road before leaving the town towards the north-west. It then passes through Frere, crossing the Bloukrans River, before intersecting the R74 at a t-junction.

Co-signed with the R74, it heads north-east for 15 kilometres and enters Colenso from the south, where its splits from the R74 which heads east. Bypassing Colenso to the west, it crosses the Tugela River heading north-west. Passing through Roosboom, it then turns north-east and enters the outskirts of Ladysmith, where it meets the N11 national route and co-signs with it northwards for 2.5 kilometres before the N11 becomes its own road eastwards at an off-ramp adjacent to the Ladysmith Airport. The R103 continues to bypass the town to its west. The R103 turns west, just south of the Windsor Dam and continues until it joins N3 at the Tugela East Toll Plaza, where a tolled on-ramp provides access to the N3. This marks the end of the first section.

=== Free State ===
Regional route R103

Route information
- Length: 106 km (66 mi)

Major junctions
- South end: N3 north of Warden
- R34 near Vrede
- North end: N3 / R26 near Villiers

Location
- Country: South Africa

Highway system
- Numbered routes of South Africa
← R102	→ R104

The second section of the R103 begins 3 km north of Warden, at an intersection with the N3. The R103 heads in a north-easterly direction to meet the R34 west of Vrede. It now heads north-west, co-signed with the R34 for a short distance (15 km) before the R34 becomes its own road westwards. Continuing north-west, the R103 passes Cornelia to its east before entering Villiers from the south. In Villiers, the R103 reaches an intersection with the R26 and the N3, just north of the N3's Wilge Toll Plaza and just south of the N3's Vaal River crossing. This marks the end of the second section of the R103.

=== Gauteng ===
Regional route R103

Route information
- Length: 32 km (20 mi)

Major junctions
- South end: N3 / R23 north of Heidelberg
- R550 north of Heidelberg; M43 / R21 near Vosloorus; R554 / N3 near Alberton
- North end: N12 near Alberton

Location
- Country: South Africa

Highway system
- Numbered routes of South Africa
← R102	→ R104

The last section of the R103 begins north of Heidelberg. It starts at a junction with the R23, just next to the R23 and N3 Heidelberg North interchange. The R103 follows the N3 north-west (parallel) as the Old Heidelberg-Alberton Road, crossing the R550 soon after and entering the City of Ekurhuleni Metropolitan Municipality. Near Vosloorus, it interchanges with the M35 (Germiston-Heidelberg Road) and the M43/R21 (Barry Marais Road) and in Roodekop, the M53. The R103 reaches a t-junction in Roodekop, south of Wadeville, Germiston, where it becomes part of the Nederveen Highway and is cosigned with the R554 westwards towards Alberton.

At the N3 highway crossing, the R554/R103 Nederveen Highway changes its name to Heidelberg Road and enters Alberton. At the Swartkoppies Road junction, the R554 becomes the road to the left (south) and the R103 remains on the westerly road, bending north towards the Alberton Central Business District and Johannesburg. From here, it is co-signed with the M31 road and becomes Ring Road West to head around the Alberton CBD (forming a semi-ring road) before becoming Voortrekker Street at the northern end of the CBD, heading north. Just after, at the junction with the N12 highway (Johannesburg Southern Bypass), the R103 designation ends and the road continuing northwards to Johannesburg Central remains designated as the M31 road.
