= Van Reenen (surname) =

Van Reenen is Dutch toponymic surname meaning "from/of Rhenen", a city in the province of Utrecht. Among variant forms, all pronounced the same, are Renen, Rheenen and Rhenen. Until 2006, there was a noble family Van Reenen. Notable people with the surname include:

- Charlie van Renen (1868–1942), South African rugby player
- Derek Van Rheenen (born 1964), Nigerian-born American soccer defender
- Esmari van Reenen (born 1981), South African sport shooter
- Godfrey van Rhenen (died 1178), Bishop of Utrecht 1156–78
- Gerlach Cornelis Joannes van Reenen (1818–1893), Dutch politician, Minister of the Interior 1853–56
- John van Reenen (1947–2018), South African discus thrower
- John Van Reenen (economist) (born 1965), British economist
- Piet van Reenen (1909–1969), Dutch football forward

== See also ==
- Ursula van Rienen (born 1957), German applied mathematician and physicist
- Van Reenen's Pass, South African mountain passnamed after the farmer Frans van Reenen
- Van Reenen, settlement on the top of that pass
