= N3 (South Africa) =

National road in South Africa

Coordinates: 28.315678°S 29.198914°E

National route N3

Route information
- Maintained by SANRAL, N3TC, eThekwini Metropolitan Municipality
- Length: 578 km (359 mi)

Major junctions
- Southeast end: Monty Naicker Street/Dr AB Xuma Road in Durban
- N2 in Durban; N11 near Ladysmith; N5 at Harrismith; N17 near Germiston; N12 near Germiston; N12 at Bedfordview
- Northwest end: N1 near Sandton

Location
- Country: South Africa
- Provinces: KwaZulu-Natal, Free State, Gauteng
- Major cities: Durban; Pinetown; Pietermaritzburg; Estcourt; Ladysmith; Harrismith; Heidelberg; Germiston; Johannesburg

Highway system
- Numbered routes of South Africa
| ← N2 | → N4 |

The N3 is a national route in South Africa that connects Johannesburg and Durban, respectively South Africa's largest and third-largest cities. Johannesburg is the financial and commercial heartland of South Africa, while Durban is South Africa's key port and one of the busiest ports in the Southern Hemisphere and is also a holiday destination. Durban is the port through which Johannesburg imports and exports most of its goods. As a result, the N3 is a very busy highway and has a high volume of traffic.

== Route ==
The N3 is divided into 12 sections, starting with section 1 in Durban and ending with section 12 in Johannesburg. Between the two cities, the route passes the following towns and cities: Pinetown, Cato Ridge, Pietermaritzburg, Howick, Mooi River, Estcourt, Ladysmith, Van Reenen, Harrismith, Warden, Villiers, Heidelberg and Germiston. It no longer passes through most of these towns, as bypasses have been built around all of them (the N3 does not pass through any city centres). The last bypass that was built was around the town of Warden.

=== KwaZulu-Natal ===
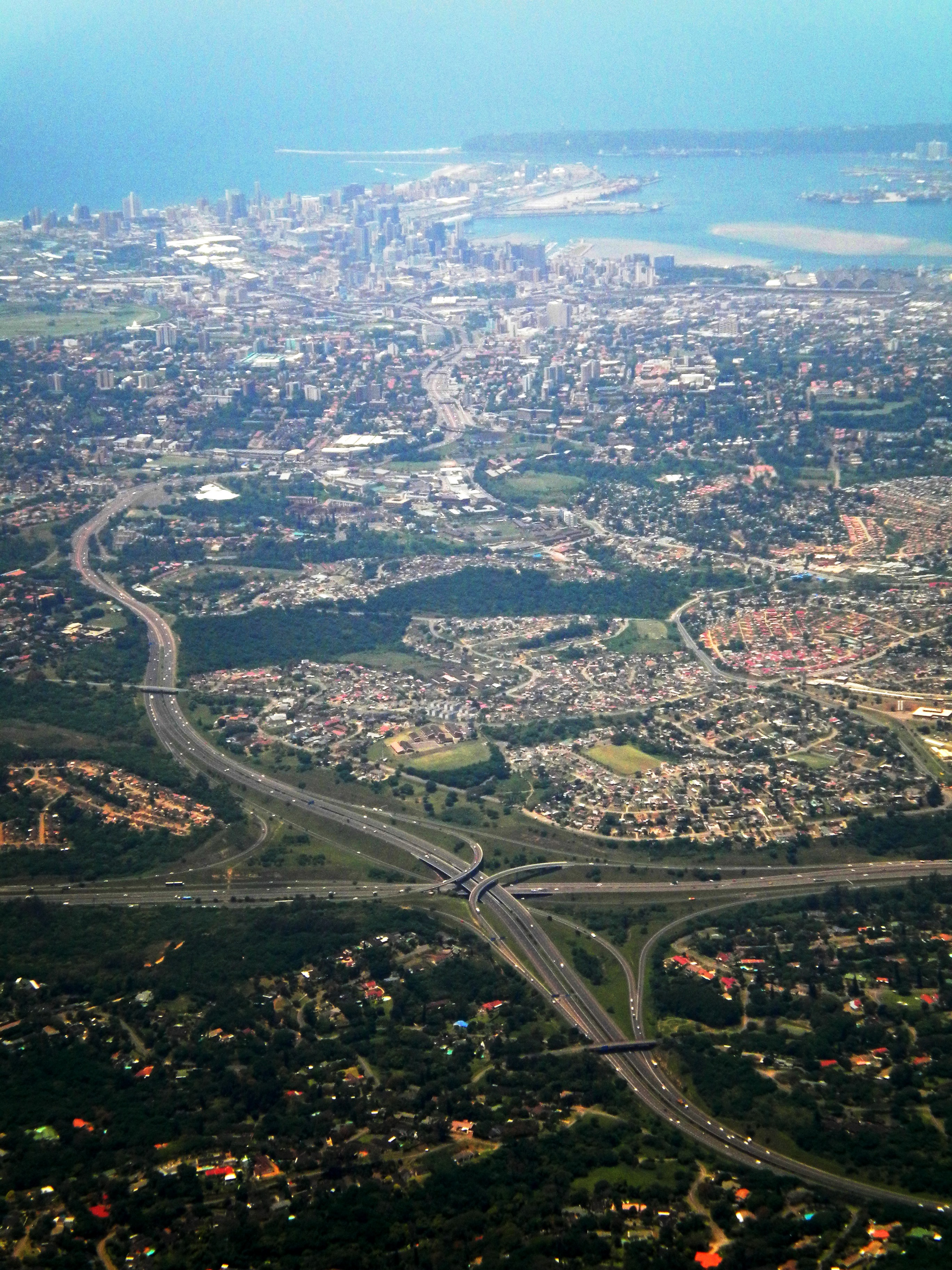
N3 freeway approaching Durban, N2/N3 E.B. Cloete Interchange in the foreground

The N3 begins in the Durban Central Business District at Monty Naicker Street and Dr AB Xuma Road as a dual-carriageway freeway and heads west, passing through Berea and Mayville before intersecting with the N2 highway (Durban Outer Ring Road) at the EB Cloete Interchange. It then exits the city of Durban and heads through the satellite town of Westville before passing to the south of Pinetown. At Mariannhill, the route becomes the Mariannhill Toll Road for a short section (passing through the Mariannhill Toll Plaza) as it leaves the urban area, and then heads towards Cato Ridge. From Cato Ridge, the route passes Camperdown before turning towards the northwest and heading towards Pietermaritzburg, the provincial capital.

After bypassing Pietermaritzburg Central to the east and north, the N3 heads up a steep incline, whereby the road ascends from an altitude of 600m to an altitude of 1,100m in a northerly direction, known as Town Hill before passing near Hilton and Howick; a road to the Southern Drakensberg (the R617) leaves the N3 at Howick. The route then becomes picturesque as it heads through the KwaZulu-Natal Midlands, passing through Mooi River (where another toll is located) before heading to Estcourt. Just past Estcourt, access to the Central and Northern Drakensberg via the R74 is provided, before the N3 heads in the direction of Ladysmith (crossing the Tugela River). The N3 bypasses Ladysmith to the west, with the N11 providing access to Ladysmith Central. The N3 from Cedara (in-between Hilton and Howick) to Heidelberg in Gauteng is managed by a private concessionaire, the N3 Toll Concession.

A few kilometres after the N11 interchange, the N3 is tolled once again; with the dual-carriageway freeway also ending at this point. From here, the N3 ascends the South African plateau via Van Reenen's Pass; at the top of the pass, the N3 crosses into the Free State.

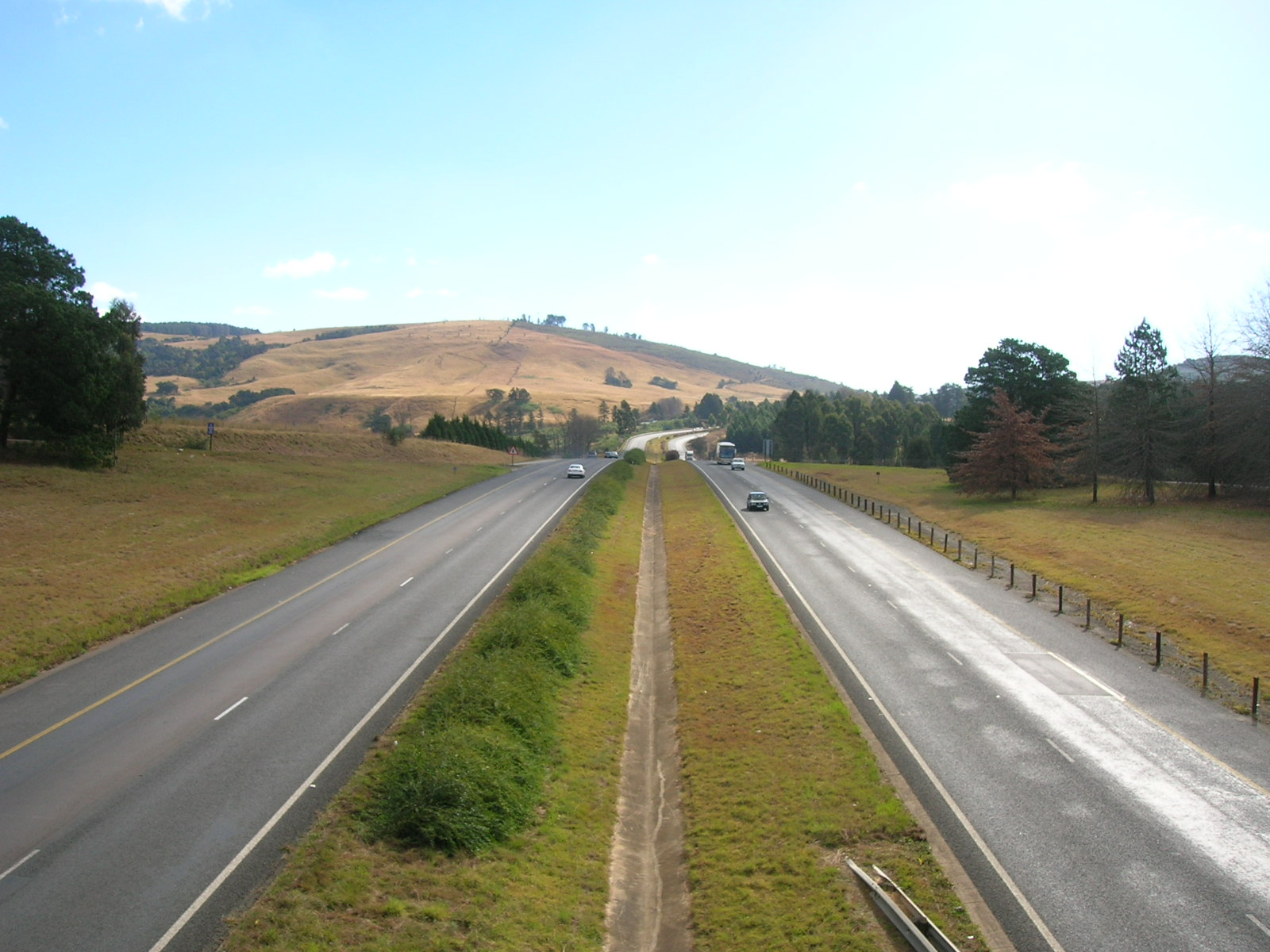
A section of the N3 in the KwaZulu-Natal Midlands, showing the dual-carriageway freeway.

=== Free State ===
After crossing into the Free State, the N3 heads through Swinburne (crossing the Wilge River) to Harrismith, where the N5 leaves it (providing a route to Bloemfontein and Cape Town via the N1). The N3 then heads to the north, and passes the town of Warden and heads towards Villiers, where a tollgate is located right before the R26 Villiers off-ramp (Wilge Toll Plaza). Immediately after Villers, the N3 crosses the Vaal River and enters Mpumalanga. Here, it becomes a dual carriageway again and remains one for its remainder.

=== Mpumalanga ===
The N3 then heads through the south-western tip of Mpumalanga in the direction of Heidelberg. Soon after crossing the Vaal River, the N3 meets the R54 road, which provides access to Vereeniging in the west. After 23 km, the N3 bypasses Grootvlei. Just before reaching Heidelberg, the N3 has its last tollgate (De Hoek Toll Plaza); this also marks the point where the N3 crosses into Gauteng.

=== Gauteng ===
The N3 then continues north, crosses the Suikerbosrand River & bypasses Heidelberg before heading towards Johannesburg. The section maintained by the N3 Toll Concession ends at the R23 (Heidelberg South) interchange south of the Heidelberg town centre and the N3 stops being a toll road.

On approaching Johannesburg, the N3 passes the townships of Vosloorus and Katlehong before bypassing Alberton. The N3 then meets the N17 toll highway at the Rand Airport Interchange near Rand Airport (each ramp onto the N17 has a tollgate). After another 1.8 kilometres north-west, the N12 (the Southern Bypass portion of the Johannesburg Ring Road) merges with the N3 at the Elands Interchange to become co-signed with it northwards as the Eastern Bypass portion of the Johannesburg Ring Road. From here, it follows much of the borderline between the City of Johannesburg and the City of Ekurhuleni.

The N3/N12 concurrency proceeds northwards from the Elands Interchange and passes in-between the cities of Johannesburg and Germiston (Capital of Ekurhuleni). It reaches the Geldenhuys Interchange, where it forms an interchange with the M2 highway (Francois Oberholzer Freeway), which provides access to the Johannesburg CBD in the west and the Germiston CBD in the east.

Next, the N3/N12 heads to Bedfordview, where the N12 leaves the N3 at the George Bizos Interchange (previously known as the Gillooly's Interchange), joins the R24 highway eastwards and provides access to the East Rand and O. R. Tambo International Airport. This interchange with the R24 is purported to be the busiest interchange in the Southern Hemisphere.

From here, the N3 continues going northwards as the Johannesburg Eastern Bypass and bypasses Edenvale and Alexandra before terminating at the Buccleuch Interchange just south of Midrand and north-east of Sandton, which is the point at which the N3, N1 and M1 converge.

== Alternative route ==
Where the N3 has been realigned, the old alignment has been designated R103. The R103 exists in three sections: between Durban and Ladysmith, between Warden and Villiers, and between Heidelberg and Johannesburg. The only exception is within Durban itself, where most of the old N3 alignment is designated as the M13 instead of having the usual R103 designation; the R103 diverges from the M13 in Gillitts just outside Durban.

The R103 is typically used to avoid the toll plazas on the N3, with one notable exception being the Tugela East Toll Plaza located on the R103 itself where the R103 and N3 meet north-west of Ladysmith.

Prior to the redesignation of the National Route numbers in 1971, the N3 moved east at Heidelberg and passed through the towns of Standerton, Volksrust and Newcastle via Laing's Nek Pass, before joining the present alignment at Ladysmith. This route, now designated R23 between Heidelberg and Volksrust and N11 thereafter to Ladysmith, remains an alternative to the N3.

== Dual carriageway sections ==
Following the opening of the motorway section in December 2001 between Heidelberg and Villiers, the N3 now has at least two lanes in each direction for its entire length between Johannesburg and Durban. The section between Johannesburg and Villiers is dual carriageway motorway. Between Villiers and Warden the road is single carriageway motorway with two lanes in each direction. From Warden to Keeversfontein (Tugela Toll Plaza; Ladysmith) the road is no longer motorway but retains two lanes in each direction. Thereafter, the route to Durban is dual carriageway motorway. This last section from Ladysmith to Durban is the third longest motorway by route number (after the N1 between the Vaal River and Modimolle and the N4 between Marikana and Wonderfontein), but the longest motorway following one alignment in South Africa.

== N3 Toll Concession ==
The N3 Toll Concession (N3TC) entered into a 30-year toll road concession contract with SANRAL on 2 November 1999 to manage the section of the N3 national route from Cedara (in-between Hilton and Howick) in KwaZulu-Natal to the R23 interchange on the southern side of Heidelberg in Gauteng, approximately 418 kilometres in length. The concession will expire in 2029.

== Proposed realignment ==
SANRAL proposed plans to re-route one section of the N3 between Keeversfontein (Tugela Toll Plaza) near Ladysmith, and the start of the tolled section near Warden, probably meeting the present alignment just south of Warden. This would involve the diversion of the road over De Beer's Pass, as opposed to Van Reenen's Pass. Not only would it reduce the route distance by 14 kilometres, but would have a lower gradient. Proponents of the new road argue that the existing Van Reenen's Pass is too steep for heavy trucks and exceeds the maximum gradient of 1:7 for an officially declared national road. This has caused a huge outcry among residents of Harrismith and Van Reenen, who rely on passing traffic to sustain businesses such as restaurants, petrol stations, and holiday rest places.

The N3 Toll Concession had stated that the De Beer's bypass would be required when daily traffic volumes reach 13,900 vehicles - the traffic volumes at Van Reenen as of 2008 was 11,000 vehicles, and based on projected increases in traffic volumes, the bypass would have needed to be operational by the end of 2014, with construction commencing in the second half of 2011. This proposed new routing of the N3 would also have a new toll plaza built on it near Warden.

In March 2017, it was decided by SANRAL that the construction of the De Beer's Pass route will not continue.

== Tolls ==
Most of the road is only usable upon the payment of toll. There are toll plazas at Mariannhill (Pinetown), Mooi River, Tugela (Ladysmith), Wilge (Villiers) and De Hoek (Heidelberg). As mentioned above, most of the toll plazas can be avoided by using the R103.

A sixth toll plaza would have been constructed south of Warden when the De Beer's bypass (mentioned above) would have been built.

Open road tolling of the northernmost part of the N3 in Gauteng, from the Heidelberg Road (R554) interchange in Alberton to the Buccleuch (N1) interchange in Sandton, came into effect from December 2013 as the e-toll system. There were 4 electronic toll gantries in each direction located on this stretch and each gantry had its own prices charged to each type of vehicle (labelled on road signage as one approaches the gantry). However, the e-toll system was shut down on 12 April 2024, making this section of the N3 a toll-free highway from then onwards.

== Moving light apparitions ==
A stretch of the N3 in the Free State is particularly known for moving light apparitions. A notable incident, reported as a UFO sighting, occurred on 8 May 2000 when a police inspector claimed to have observed an approaching UFO while travelling on the N3 freeway, 70 km north of Warden in the eastern Free State province. The orange, oval-shaped craft was fitted with two cupolas, one above and another below, and was wide enough to cover four lanes of the freeway. After a close approach the craft receded again.

== Junctions ==
=== KwaZulu-Natal ===
| Municipality | Location | km | mi | Exit | Destinations | Notes |
|---|---|---|---|---|---|---|
| EThekwini | Durban Central | 0 | 0 | — | Monty Naicker Road, Dr AB Xuma Street, Dr Yusuf Dadoo Street, Durban Central | At-grade intersection |
| EThekwini | Durban Central | 0 | 0 | — | Davis Lane, Russell Street, Durban Central | At-grade intersection; Westbound exit and entrance |
| EThekwini | Durban Central | 0 | 0 | 1 | Chris Ntuli Road, M4 Johannes Nkosi Street east, Durban Central, R102 Umgeni Road, North Coast | Eastbound exit, westbound entrance |
| EThekwini | Berea | 0 | 0 | 2 | M13 King Dinizulu Road (South), Berea | Westbound exit, eastbound entrance |
| EThekwini | Berea | 0 | 0 | 3 | M13 King Dinizulu Road, Berea | |
| EThekwini | Berea | 0 | 0 | 4 | M10 Felix Dlamini Road, Berea, Overport | |
| EThekwini | Mayville | 0 | 0 | 5 | M13 King Cetshwayo Highway, Sherwood, Mayville | |
| EThekwini | Westville | 0 | 0 | (165) | N2, Port Shepstone, KwaDukuza | EB Cloete Interchange |
| EThekwini | Westville | 0 | 0 | 13 | M32 St James Avenue, Harry Gwala Road, Westville | |
| EThekwini | Pinetown | 0 | 0 | 17 | M13 King Cetshwayo Highway west, Pinetown | Westbound exit, eastbound entrance |
| EThekwini | Pinetown | 0 | 0 | 20 | M7 Solomon Mahlangu Drive, Queensburgh, Pinetown | Eastbound exit, westbound entrance |
| EThekwini | Pinetown | 0 | 0 | 23 | M1 Henry Pennington Road, Mariannhill, Pinetown | |
| EThekwini | Pinetown | 0 | 0 | 26 | Stockville Road, Mahogany Ridge | Westbound exit, eastbound entrance |
| EThekwini | Pinetown | 0 | 0 | SANRAL Mariannhill Toll Plaza | | |
| EThekwini | Assagay | 0 | 0 | 32 | Kassier Road, Assagay, Shongweni | |
| EThekwini | Assagay | 0 | 0 | 35 | M13 King Cetshwayo Highway, Hillcrest | Eastbound exit, westbound entrance |
| EThekwini | Mpumalanga | 0 | 0 | 40 | Meadway Road, Peacevale, Sterkspruit Road, Cliffdale | Westbound exit, eastbound entrance; To be closed as part of N3 upgrades in KwaZulu-Natal |
| EThekwini | Mpumalanga | 0 | 0 | 43 | Mthoko Mkhize Drive, Inchanga, Mpumalanga | |
| EThekwini | Cato Ridge | 0 | 0 | 53 | R103 Old Main Road, Cato Ridge, Inchanga | |
| Mkhambathini | Camperdown | 0 | 0 | 57 | R103 Old Main Road, Camperdown | |
| Mkhambathini | Camperdown | 0 | 0 | 61 | R603 Umlaas Road, Umbumbulu, R103 Old Main Road, Thornville | |
| Msunduzi | Ashburton | 0 | 0 | 65 | R103 Old Main Road, Lynnfield Park | |
| Msunduzi | Ashburton | 0 | 0 | 69 | Pope Ellis Drive, Ashburton | |
| Msunduzi | Pietermaritzburg | 0 | 0 | 74 | Market Road, Pietermaritzburg Airport | |
| Msunduzi | Pietermaritzburg | 0 | 0 | 76 | Alan Paton Avenue, Scottsville | No eastbound exit |
| Msunduzi | Pietermaritzburg | 0 | 0 | 77 | R56 New England Road, Scottsville, Hayfields | |
| Msunduzi | Pietermaritzburg | 0 | 0 | 79 | M20 Ohrtmann Road, Pietermaritzburg Central, Willowton | Westbound exit, eastbound entrance |
| Msunduzi | Pietermaritzburg | 0 | 0 | 81 | M70 Dr Chota Motala Road, Pietermaritzburg Central, R33 Bhambatha Road, Greytown | |
| Msunduzi | Pietermaritzburg | 0 | 0 | 82 | Armitage Road, Town Hill, Sanctuary Road, Chasedene | Westbound exit, eastbound entrance |
| Msunduzi | Pietermaritzburg | 0 | 0 | 83 | M40 Chatterton Road, Pietermaritzburg Central, Northern Park | Eastbound exit, westbound entrance |
| Msunduzi | Pietermaritzburg | 0 | 0 | 86 | Peter Brown Drive, Wembley, Montrose | Eastbound exit, westbound entrance |
| UMngeni | Hilton | 0 | 0 | 94 | M80 Hilton Avenue, Hilton | |
| UMngeni | Hilton | 0 | 0 | 96 | R103 Cedara Road, Cedara, Hilton | |
| UMngeni | Howick | 0 | 0 | 99 | R617 Boston Road, Howick (South), Mpophomeni | |
| UMngeni | Howick | 0 | 0 | 103 | R103 Prospect Road, Howick, Midmar | |
| UMngeni | Howick | 0 | 0 | 107 | R107 Main Road, Howick (North), Tweedie | |
| UMngeni | Lions River | 0 | 0 | 114 | Currys Post, Lions River | |
| UMngeni | Nottingham Road | 0 | 0 | 125 | Currys Post Road, Balgowan, Currys Post | |
| UMngeni | Nottingham Road | 0 | 0 | 132 | Nottingham Road, Currys Post | |
| Mpofana | Mooi River | 0 | 0 | 143 | R103 Old Main Road, Mooi River (South), Bruntville | Tolled exit and entrance |
| Mpofana | Mooi River | 0 | 0 | 146 | Commercial Road, R103 Old Main Road, Mooi River (North), Giants Castle | Tolled southbound exit and northbound entrance |
| Mpofana | Mooi River | 0 | 0 | 152 | Hidcote Road, Hidcote, Middelrus | |
| Inkosi Langalibalele | Estcourt | 0 | 0 | 168 | Lowlands Road, Estcourt (South) | |
| Inkosi Langalibalele | Estcourt | 0 | 0 | 175 | Ntabamhlophe Road, Estcourt, Wembezi, Giants Castle | |
| Inkosi Langalibalele | Estcourt | 0 | 0 | 179 | Loskop Road, Estcourt (North), Loskop | |
| Inkosi Langalibalele | Frere | 0 | 0 | 194 | R74, Frere, Winterton, Colenso | |
| Okhahlamba | Winterton | 0 | 0 | 207 | Old Colenso Road, Winterton, Colenso | |
| Okhahlamba | Bergville | 0 | 0 | 230 | N11, Ladysmith, R616, Bergville | Tolled northbound exit and southbound entrance |
| Alfred Duma | Ladysmith | 0 | 0 | SANRAL Tugela Toll Plaza | | |
| Alfred Duma | Ladysmith | 0 | 0 | 246 | R103 east, Ladysmith | Tolled exit and entrance; SANRAL Tugela East Toll Plaza on R103 |
N3 continues into the Free State

=== Free State ===
| Municipality | Location | km | mi | Exit | Destinations | Notes |
|---|---|---|---|---|---|---|
| Maluti-a-Phofung | Harrismith | 0 | 0 | 29 | N5, Harrismith, Bethlehem | |
| Maluti-a-Phofung | Harrismith | 0 | 0 | 34 | Warden Street, Harrismith | |
| Maluti-a-Phofung | Harrismith | 0 | 0 | — | R722 Kilane Street, Verkykerskop | At-grade intersection |
| Phumelela | Warden | 0 | 0 | 82 | R714, Bethlehem, Oosthuyse Street, Warden | |
| Phumelela | Warden | 0 | 0 | (76) | R103, Vrede | |
| Phumelela | Vrede | 0 | 0 | 107 | Roadside, Reitz | |
| Mafube | Cornelia | 0 | 0 | 133 | R34, Vrede, Cornelia, Frankfort | |
| Mafube | Villiers | 0 | 0 | SANRAL Wilge Toll Plaza | | |
| Mafube | Villiers | 0 | 0 | 169 | R26, R103, Villiers, Gladdrif, Frankfort | |
N3 continues into Mpumalanga

=== Mpumalanga ===
| Municipality | Location | km | mi | Exit | Destinations | Notes |
|---|---|---|---|---|---|---|
| Dipaleseng | Grootvlei | 0 | 0 | 5 | R51, Grootvlei, Balfour, R54, Vereeniging | |
| Dipaleseng | Grootvlei | 0 | 0 | 28 | Springfield Avenue, Grootvlei | |
N3 continues into Gauteng

=== Gauteng ===
| Municipality | Location | km | mi | Exit | Destinations | Notes |
|---|---|---|---|---|---|---|
| Midvaal | Heidelberg | 0 | 0 | SANRAL De Hoek Toll Plaza | | |
| Lesedi | Heidelberg | 0 | 0 | (63) | Heidelberg Traffic Control Centre | |
| Lesedi | Heidelberg | 0 | 0 | 59 | R23 Heidelberg-Balfour Road, Heidelberg (South), Standerton | |
| Lesedi | Heidelberg | 0 | 0 | 66 | R42 Jacobs Street, Heidelberg, Nigel | |
| Lesedi | Heidelberg | 0 | 0 | 70 | R23 Heidelberg Road, Heidelberg (North), Benoni, R103 Old Heidelberg-Alberton Road, Alberton | |
| Lesedi | Heidelberg | 0 | 0 | 79 | R550, Nigel, R103 Old Heidelberg-Alberton Road, Heidelberg (North), Alberton | |
| Ekurhuleni | Vosloorus | 0 | 0 | 89 | M43 Barry Marais Road, Vosloorus, Boksburg | |
| Ekurhuleni | Germiston | 0 | 0 | 93 | R53 Leondale Road, Spruitview, Germiston | |
| Ekurhuleni | Germiston | 0 | 0 | 98 | R554 Heidelberg Road, Alberton | |
| Ekurhuleni | Germiston | 0 | 0 | 101 | M94 Grey Avenue, Alberton, Germiston | |
| Ekurhuleni | Germiston | 0 | 0 | 103 | N17, Johannesburg, Springs | Tolled exit and entrance |
| Ekurhuleni | Germiston | 0 | 0 | 105A | N12 Southern Bypass west, Potchefstroom, Kimberley | Signed as Exit 105 southbound; Southern end of concurrency with N12 |
| Ekurhuleni | Germiston | 0 | 0 | 105B | M2 Francois Oberholzer Freeway west, Johannesburg | Not an actual exit; connects to far left lane of N3 northbound for easier access to exit 108A; Northbound exit only |
| Ekurhuleni | Germiston | 0 | 0 | 106 | M46 Rand Airport Road, M48 Van Riebeeck Avenue, Rand Airport, Alberton, Germiston | Southbound exit, northbound entrance |
| Ekurhuleni | Germiston | 0 | 0 | 108A | M2 Francois Oberholzer Freeway west, Johannesburg | |
| Ekurhuleni | Germiston | 0 | 0 | 108B | M2 Francois Oberholzer Freeway east, Germiston | |
| Ekurhuleni | Bedfordview | 0 | 0 | 110 | M52 Van Buuren Road, Bedfordview, Malvern | |
| Ekurhuleni | Bedfordview | 0 | 0 | 113A | R24 Albertina Sisulu Road east, N12 east, O. R. Tambo International, Witbank | Signed as Exit 113 southbound; Northern end of concurrency with N12 |
| Ekurhuleni | Bedfordview | 0 | 0 | 113B | R24 Albertina Sisulu Road west, Johannesburg | Signed as Exit 113 southbound; Northern end of concurrency with N12 |
| Ekurhuleni | Edenvale | 0 | 0 | 116 | M16 Linksfield Road, Edenvale, Linksfield | |
| Ekurhuleni | Edenvale | 0 | 0 | 119A | R25 Modderfontein Road east, Edenvale, Kempton Park | Southbound exit and entrance |
| Ekurhuleni | Edenvale | 0 | 0 | 119B | R25 Modderfontein Road, Edenvale, Modderfontein | Signed as Exit 119 northbound |
| Johannesburg | Alexandra | 0 | 0 | 121 | M54 Vincent Tshabalala Road, Alexandra, Modderfontein | |
| Johannesburg | Sandton | 0 | 0 | 124 | M60 Marlboro Drive, Linbro Park, Marlboro Gardens | |
| Johannesburg | Sandton | 0 | 0 | (104) | M1 De Villiers Graaff Motorway south, Johannesburg, N1 Western Bypass south, Roodepoort, N1 Ben Schoeman Freeway north, Pretoria | |
N3 ends

== Notable interchanges ==
| Distance from origin (km) | Exit number | Destinations | Notes |
|---|---|---|---|
| 0 | | Durban Central Business District | N3 begins |
| 8 | 165 | N2 - Stanger, Port Shepstone | |
| 17 | 17 | M13 - Pinetown | Northbound only |
| 20 | 20 | M7 - Pinetown, Queensburgh | Southbound only |
| 27 | | | Mariannhill Toll Plaza |
| 35 | 35 | M13 - Hillcrest | Southbound only |
| 50 | 50 | R103 - Cato Ridge | |
| 55 | 55 | Camperdown | |
| 60 | 60 | R103 - Umlaas Road | |
| 65 | 65 | R103 - Lynnefield Park / Lion Park | |
| 76 | 76 | Pietermaritzburg | Northbound only |
| 77 | 77 | R56 - New England Road | |
| 81 | 81 | R33 - Greytown | |
| 83 | 83 | Pietermaritzburg | Southbound only |
| 99 | 99 | R617 - Bulwer, Southern Drakensberg | |
| 143 | 143 | Mooi River | Mooi Toll Plaza |
| 179 | 179 | Central Drakensberg | |
| 194 | 194 | R74 - Colenso, Winterton, Northern Drakensberg | |
| 230 | 230 | N11 - Ladysmith; R616 - Bergville | |
| 246 | 246 | R103 - Ladysmith | Tugela Toll Plaza (on N3); Tugela East Toll Plaza (on R103); Dual-carriageway ends Proposed start of De Beer's bypass |
| 272 | | | KwaZulu-Natal/Free State provincial border |
| 301 | 29 | N5 - Harrismith, Bethlehem, Bloemfontein (via N1) | |
| 354 | 82 | Warden | Proposed end of De Beer's bypass |
| 405 | 133 | R34 - Vrede, Frankfort | |
| 441 | 169 | R26 - Villiers | Wilge Toll Plaza |
| 442 | | | Free State/Mpumalanga provincial border Dual-carriageway recommences |
| 447 | 5 | R51 - Balfour; R54 - Vereeniging | |
| 490 (approx.) | | | Mpumalanga/Gauteng provincial border De Hoek Toll Plaza |
| 501 | 59 | R23 - Heidelberg (south), Standerton | |
| 508 | 66 | R42 - Heidelberg (central), Nigel | |
| 512 | 70 | R23 - Heidelberg (north), Benoni | |
| 545 | 103 | N17 - Johannesburg, Springs | Gosforth Toll Plaza (on N17 ramp) |
| 547 | 105 | N12 - Potchefstroom, Kimberley | N12 merges with N3 |
| 550 | 108 | M2 - Johannesburg, Germiston | |
| 555 | 113 | N12 - Witbank; R24 - Johannesburg, OR Tambo International Airport | N12 separates from N3 and merges with R24 |
| 569 | 104 | N1 - Bloemfontein, Pretoria; M1 - Johannesburg | N3 ends |
