= Eastern Bypass =

Eastern Bypass may refer to one of the following highways:

- Fremantle Eastern Bypass, a former proposed highway in Fremantle, Western Australia, Australia
- Isfahan Eastern Bypass Freeway, a freeway in Greater Isfahan Region, Isfahan, Iran
- N3 Eastern Bypass (Johannesburg), a section of the Johannesburg Ring Road in South Africa
- Nairobi Eastern Bypass Highway, a highway in Nairobi, Kenya
- Pretoria Eastern Bypass, a section of the Pretoria Ring Road in South Africa
- Pietermaritzburg Ring Road, a freeway in Pietermaritzburg, South Africa
- Polokwane Eastern Bypass, a freeway in Polokwane, South Africa

== See also ==
- Eastern Metropolitan Bypass, a highway in Kolkata, India
