= R622 (South Africa) =

Regional route in South Africa

Regional route R622

Route information
- Length: 68 km (42 mi)

Major junctions
- West end: R103 in Mooi River
- East end: R74 in Greytown

Location
- Country: South Africa

Highway system
- Numbered routes of South Africa
← R621	→ R624

The R622 is a Regional Route in KwaZulu-Natal, South Africa that connects Mooi River with Greytown.

== Route ==
Its western terminus is the R103 at Mooi River. It passes under the N3 and exits the town to the east. It runs east to end at Greytown at an intersection with the R74.
