= Griffin's Hill =

- Location within KwaZulu-Natal
- Elevation: 1,590 m (5,220 ft)
- Traversed by: R103

Third Approach
- Location: Mooi River and Estcourt
- Coordinates: 29°05′35.5″S 29°57′58.5″E

Griffin's Hill Pass, also known as just Griffin's Hill, is situated in the KwaZulu-Natal province of South Africa, on the Regional road R103 between Mooi River and Estcourt.
