= R600 =

R600 may refer to:

- Radeon R600, a unified shader architecture and Direct3D 10 graphics processing unit developed by ATI
- R600 road (Ireland), a regional road in Ireland
- R600 road (South Africa), a Regional Route in South Africa
- Ericsson R600, a mobile phone by Ericsson

== See also ==
- R-600A, the refrigerant isobutane
