= Lars Svensson =

Lars Svensson may refer to:

- Lars Svensson (ornithologist) (born 1941), Swedish ornithologist
- Lars Georg Svensson, American thoracic and cardiovascular surgeon
- Lars E. O. Svensson (born 1947), Swedish economist
- Lars Svensson (ice hockey) (1926–1999), Swedish ice hockey player
