= Mpumalanga, KwaZulu-Natal =

Town in South Africa

Mpumalanga Township Hammarsdale
- Location within KwaZulu-Natal Location within South Africa
- Coordinates: 29.817°S 30.637°E
- Country: South Africa
- Province: KwaZulu-Natal
- Municipality: eThekwini

Area
  - Total: 21.66 km^{2} (8.36 sq mi)

Population (2011)
  - Total: 62,406
  - Density: 2,881/km^{2} (7,462/sq mi)

Racial makeup (2011)
  - Black African: 98.5%
  - Coloured: 0.2%
  - Indian/Asian: 0.2%
  - White: 1.1%
  - Other: 0.1%

First languages (2011)
  - Zulu: 92.5%
  - English: 2.3%
  - S. Ndebele: 1.3%
  - Other: 3.8%
- Time zone: UTC+2 (SAST)
- Postal code (street): 3700
- PO box: 3700
- Area code: 031

Mpumalanga, also widely known as Hammarsdale, is a township located in the eThekwini Metropolitan Municipality in the KwaZulu-Natal province of South Africa. It is situated some 10 km south-south-east of Cato Ridge and some 50 km west of Durban. Derived from Zulu, the name means 'sunrise', 'the sun comes out'.

The township boasts of a local library known as Mpumalanga Library and a shopping center which has become the heart of the township known as the Hammarsdale Junction. There is a local stadium and an Elangeni College campus located in the heart of Mpumalanga. Among amenities such as clinics, police stations, a SASSA and a home affairs office, the township has a variety of schools, some of which are mentioned below.

== Legacy of political conflict ==
The township was engulfed in severe political violence in the latter 1980s to early 1990s and was one of the hotspots of political conflict in KwaZulu-Natal.

== Geography ==
Mpumalanga forms the easternmost boundary of the eThekwini Metropolitan Municipality (Greater Durban region) with the adjoining Mkhambathini Local Municipality in the uMgungundlovu District along with Cato Ridge to the north.

Mpumalanga lies within the hilly region between Durban and Pietermaritzburg known as the Valley of a Thousand Hills and is located north of the uMlazi River. Mpumalanga spans an extensive area of 21,66 km^{2} and is largely subdivided into multi-sections primarily in the form of letters from A to H as well as other areas with names such as Elangeni, Hammars Estate, Mpumalanga East and Zamani.

The nearest regional urban centre to Mpumalanga is Pinetown, located approximately 35 kilometres to the east while Pietermaritzburg, approximately 39 kilometres to the north-west also serves as an urban centre to Mpumalanga as opposed to the larger city of Durban which is considerably further. Other neighbouring towns include Cato Ridge (10 km), Camperdown (16 km) and Hillcrest (24 km).

== Infrastructure ==
=== Roads ===
Mpumalanga is centred on two roads, namely the M50 also named Mthoko Mkhize Drive leading to Cato Ridge and Inchanga and Buthelezi/Sibisi Drive leading to Shongweni and Hillcrest. The M50 leading to Inchanga provides direct access to the N3 highway between Pietermaritzburg and Durban at the Hammarsdale interchange, just outside Mpumalanga.

== People ==
- The Joy, an a cappella group.
- James Mpanza, Co-founder of Orlando Pirates FC , who became known as the "Father of Soweto".
- Bongiwe Msomi, former South Africa netball captain.
- Meshack Radebe, politician.
- Pearl Thusi, actress, model, and presenter.
- Nomcebo Zikode, singer and songwriter.
