= Ring roads in South Africa =

There are a number of ring roads found in South Africa.

== List of ring roads ==
Ring Road	Description	Notes
Johannesburg	The Johannesburg Ring Road is made from the N1, N3 and N12 highways and create a full loop around the city of Johannesburg.	
Pretoria	The Pretoria Ring Road is made from the N1 and N4 highways, which create a half loop around the city of Pretoria.	
Cape Town	The Peninsula Expressway is a proposed road. It will be formed by the N21, which is to form a half-loop around the city of Cape Town.	
Durban	The Durban Outer Ring Road is fully made from the N2 highway, which creates a half loop around the city of Durban.	
Bloemfontein	The Bloemfontein Ring Road is fully made from the N1 highway, which creates a half loop around the city of Bloemfontein.	
Polokwane	The Polokwane Ring Road is fully made from the N1 highway, which creates a half loop around the city of Polokwane.	
Pietermaritzburg	The Pietermaritzburg Ring Road is fully made from the N3 highway, which creates a half loop around the city of Pietermaritzburg.	
