= R621 road =

R621 road may refer to:

- R621 road (Ireland)
- R621 (South Africa)
