= Nottingham Road =

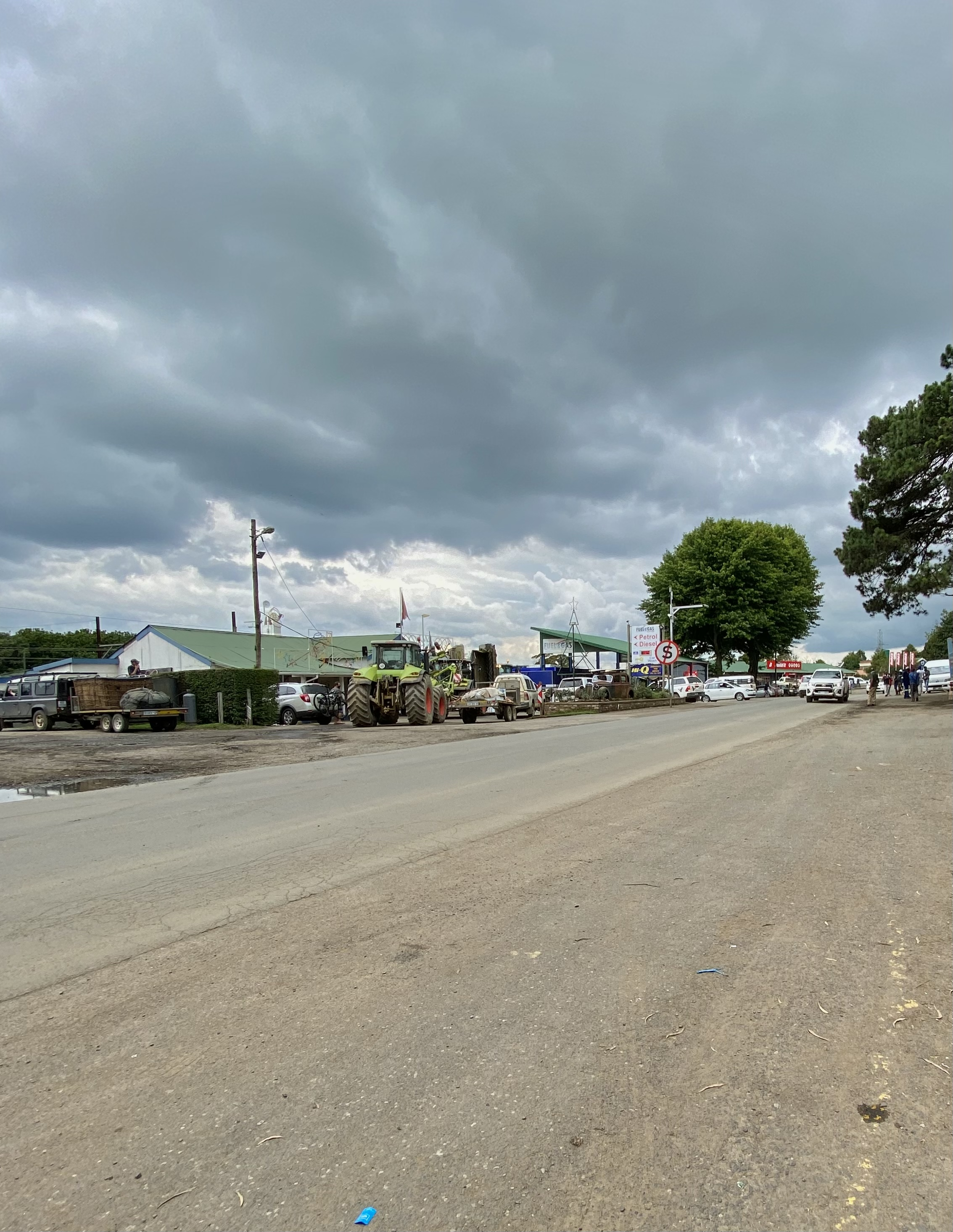
- Town Centre

- Location within KwaZulu-Natal Location within South Africa
- Coordinates: 29°21′0″S 30°0′0″E
- Country: South Africa
- Province: KwaZulu-Natal
- District: uMgungundlovu
- Municipality: uMngeni

Area
  - Total: 3.07 km^{2} (1.19 sq mi)

Population (2011)
  - Total: 1,277
  - Density: 416/km^{2} (1,080/sq mi)

Racial makeup (2011)
  - Black African: 68.2%
  - Coloured: 0.8%
  - Indian/Asian: 3.7%
  - White: 26.9%
  - Other: 0.5%

First languages (2011)
  - Zulu: 56.9%
  - English: 34.8%
  - Afrikaans: 4.1%
  - Sotho: 1.6%
  - Other: 2.6%
- Time zone: UTC+2 (SAST)
- Postal code (street): 3280
- PO box: 3280
- Area code: 033

Nottingham Road is a town 19 km south of Mooi River and 59 km north-west of Pietermaritzburg on the R103 road in South Africa. Founded in 1905 and named after the Nottingham Regiment which was stationed there when trouble was expected from the Basotho in the 19th century. A popular trout-fishing area.

== History ==
Settlers from Scotland settled the area in the mid-19th century. At the end of 1885, the railway reached where the town now lies, before which the area was named after the contractor Harrison's Camp. For two years, it was known as Karkloof Station, but since Karkloof and the nearby Karkloof Forest were far away and nobody from there used the station, it was renamed Nottingham Road Station after Fort Nottingham down the road. The station started developing the area as a rural center.

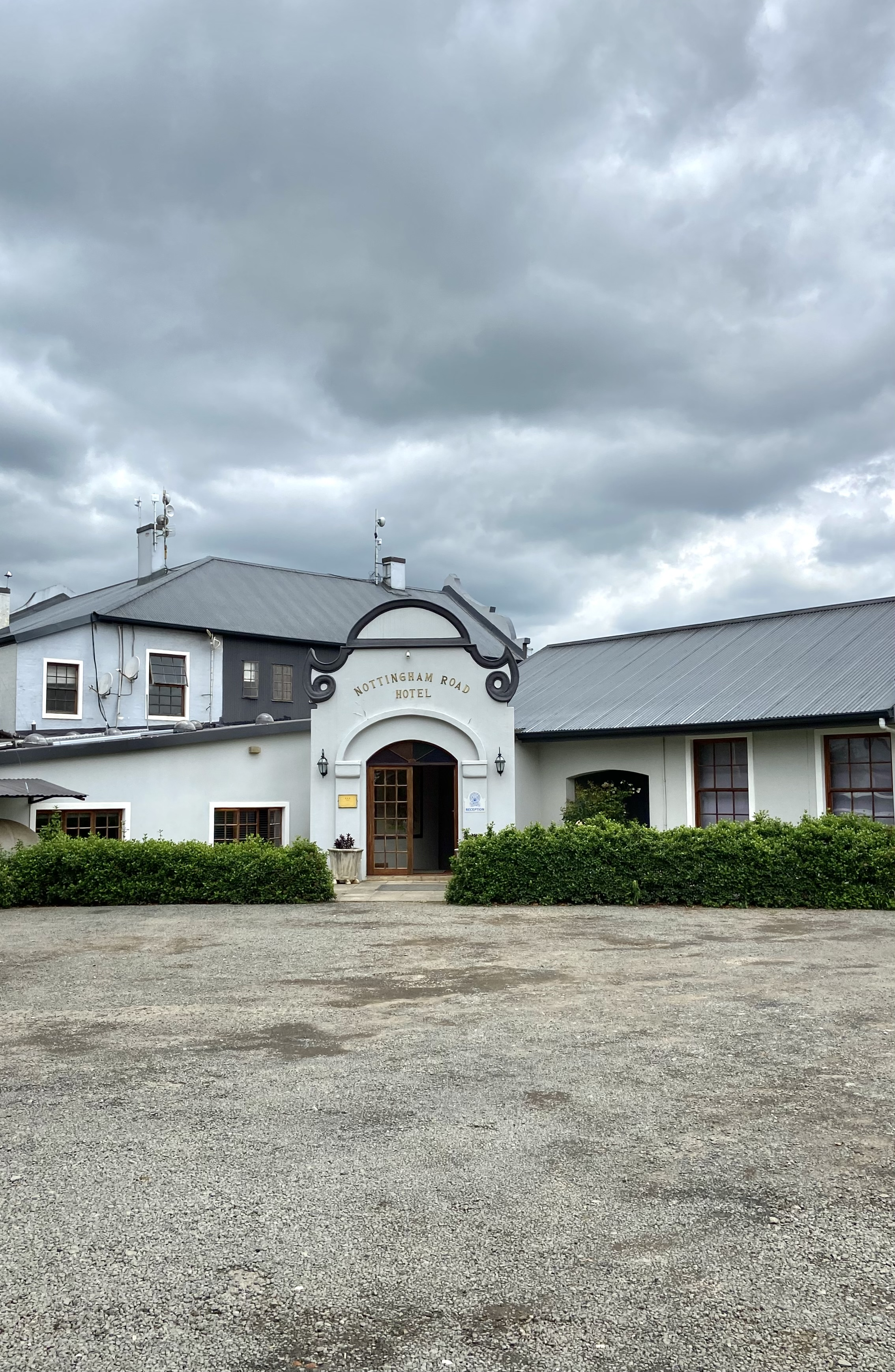
Nottingham Road Hotel

A small hotel and store were established where George Nicol's smithy would later be (now the location of the Mount West liquor store). In 1889, George Orwin bought the land where the Railway Hotel (today known as the Nottingham Road Hotel) would be built by C. Morgan and finished in 1891. In April 1884, John King donated the grounds where a small wood and iron Presbyterian church known as St. John's Gowrie would be built, and it opened in February 1885. A memorial to those from the area who lost their lives in World War I opened on the church grounds near the entrance on 26 January 1992.

The Nottingham Road Farmers' Association, one of the oldest agricultural societies in South Africa, was founded on 26 October 1887 by 11 prominent local citizens in the Railway Hotel. Their meeting hall, a longtime project, opened in December 1933. Today, it hosts the Notthingham Road Landowners' Association and a local library. The hall is used for the Association's meetings and also rented out for other functions.

In 1866, the first sheep were brought from Cape Colony via a thousand-mile overland journey. Livestock theft by local San people led to the 1869 Reprisal launched from Fort Nottingham. The campaign, which established the boundaries in the settlers' favor, was commemorated in some of the final San rock art.

== Leisure ==
- Horse riding, polo and drag hunting are popular recreation activities in the area.
- Trout-fishing here dates to 1884.
- Every May, the two-day Sherwood Medieval Festival is held in town.
