= Johannesburg Ring Road =

Ring Road in South Africa

Route information
- Length: 83.2 km (51.7 mi)
- Existed: 1971–present

Major junctions
- Beltway around Johannesburg
- N1 in to N3 at Buccleuch Interchange; N3 in to N12 at Elands Interchange; N12 in to N1 at Diepkloof Interchange

Location
- Country: South Africa

Highway system
- Numbered routes of South Africa
← Pietermaritzburg Ring Road	→ Pretoria Ring Road

The Johannesburg Ring Road is a set of freeways that circle the city of Johannesburg, South Africa and service the City of Johannesburg Metropolitan Municipality. The entire ring road is approximately 83 km long and was an e-toll highway (with open road tolling) from 3 December 2013 up until e-tolls were shut down in Gauteng on 12 April 2024.

== History ==
Construction on the Ring Road began in the late 1960s. Sections of the Eastern Bypass first opened in 1971 while the last section of the Southern Bypass opened in 1986.

The Ring Road had two major aims when it was built: to allow traffic not destined for Johannesburg to bypass the city along a number of high-speed freeways in quick and easy fashion and also to allow for the mobility of Apartheid South African Army to defend the state from hostile neighbours or to quell violence in black townships during a state of emergency.

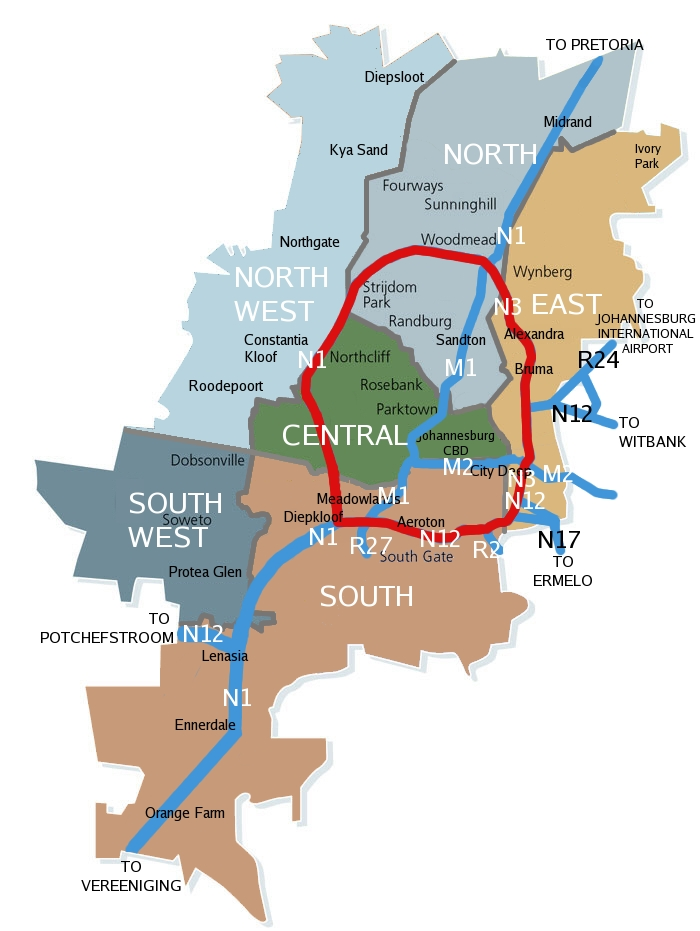
Johannesburg Ring Road

== The Route ==
The Road is composed of three freeways that converge on the city, and form an 80-kilometre (50 mi) loop around Johannesburg. The 3 freeways that create the Ring Road include the N3 Eastern Bypass, the N1 Western Bypass and the N12 Southern Bypass.

The entire road was built with asphalt and is mostly 8 lanes wide throughout (4 lanes in either direction), with parts having up to 12 lanes wide in some areas (6 lanes in either direction), the Johannesburg Ring Road is frequently clogged with traffic.

The main intersections that complete the ring road include the Elands Interchange, that connects the N3 Eastern Bypass with the N12 Southern Bypass, the Diepkloof Interchange, that connects the N12 Southern Bypass with the N1 Western Bypass and finally the Buccleuch Interchange connecting the N1 Western Bypass with the N3 Eastern Bypass.

Johannesburg Ring Road
