= R600 (South Africa) =

Regional route in South Africa

Regional route R600

Route information
- Length: 67 km (42 mi)

Major junctions
- North-east end: N11 near Ladysmith
- R74 in Winterton
- South-west end: Champagne Castle

Location
- Country: South Africa

Highway system
- Numbered routes of South Africa
← R580	→ R602

The R600 is a Regional Route in South Africa.

== Route ==
Its north-eastern terminus is the N11 south-west of Ladysmith, just east of the N11's divergence from the N3. It heads southwest, crossing the N3 to reach Winterton, where it intersects the R74 at a staggered junction. From Winterton, it continues south-west, ending at the Champagne Castle hotel at an entrance to uKhahlamba / Drakensberg Park.
