= EB Cloete Interchange =

Road junction near Durban, South Africa

- Abdullah Mohamed Omar Interchange
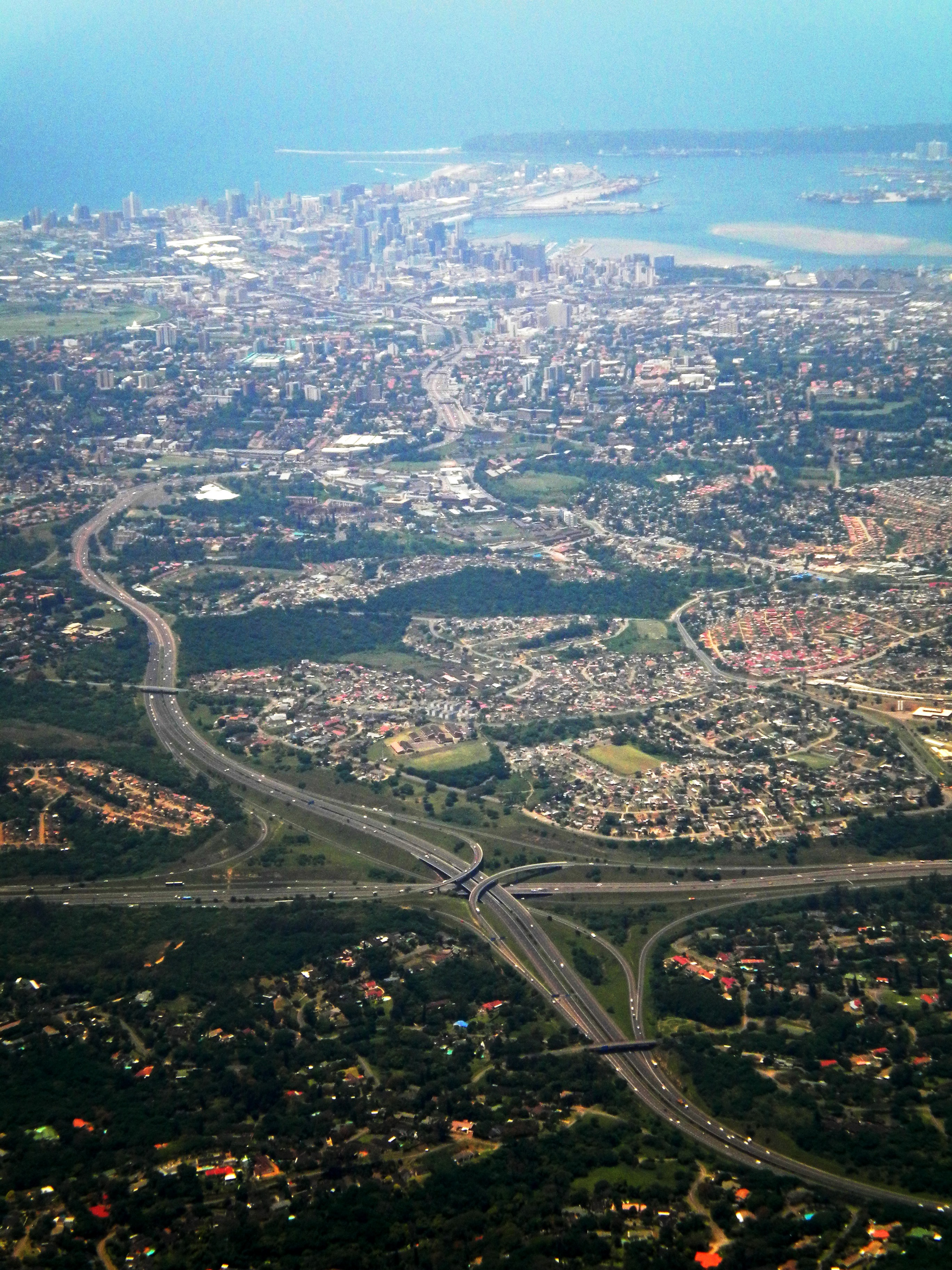
- Interactive map of EB Cloete Interchange

Location
- Durban, South Africa
- Coordinates: 29°50′26.82″S 30°57′25.84″E
- Roads at junction: N2; N3

Construction
- Type: Cloverleaf Interchange
- Spans: 4
- Lanes: 3-4
- Maintained by: South African National Roads Agency

The EB Cloete Interchange, officially called the Abdullah Mohamed Omar Interchange, near Durban in South Africa is the interchange between two national roads that pass through Durban: the N2 and N3. The only four-level stack interchange in South Africa has been given various nicknames, the most famous one is Spaghetti Junction.

The N3 is the busiest highway in South Africa and is a very busy truck route. Since Johannesburg is not located near a body of water such as a river or an ocean, most of the city's exports rely on the Port of Durban to export its goods. The N2 connects Cape Town with Durban, and it serves other South African cities as well, such as Port Elizabeth, East London, George and the towns of Mthatha, Port Shepstone and Richards Bay and iSimangaliso Wetland Park. Two very busy roads intersect at this junction, thus leading to a very busy junction. A four-level stack interchange was chosen for this junction to serve the high volumes of traffic.

== Origin of nickname ==
The interchange's nickname comes from that of Gravelly Hill Junction in Birmingham, UK, which had opened fifteen years previously and been given the nickname "Spaghetti Junction" by locals.

== History ==
In 2004, then Minister of Arts and Culture, Pallo Jordan, approved the renaming of the interchange in honour of Dullah Omar.

== Upgrade ==
In 2023, SANRAL awarded a R 4.1 billion contract for the upgrade of the interchange to the joint venture of Base Major and China State Construction Engineering. This was the largest road project allocated by SANRAL. Controversy arose after it was found that the winning bidders were previously disqualified. The joint venture was also previously disqualified from the R 2.4 billion Ashburton Interchange upgrade on the N3 near Pietermaritzburg.
