= Cato Ridge =

- Location within KwaZulu-Natal Location within South Africa
- Coordinates: 29.716°S 30.616°E
- Country: South Africa
- Province: KwaZulu-Natal
- Municipality: eThekwini

Area
  - Total: 20.18 km^{2} (7.79 sq mi)

Population (2011)
  - Total: 3,874
  - Density: 192.0/km^{2} (497.2/sq mi)

Racial makeup (2011)
  - Black African: 92.2%
  - Coloured: 1.0%
  - Indian/Asian: 0.9%
  - White: 5.4%
  - Other: 0.4%

First languages (2011)
  - Zulu: 78.5%
  - English: 7.2%
  - Afrikaans: 4.1%
  - Xhosa: 3.0%
  - Other: 7.2%
- Time zone: UTC+2 (SAST)
- PO box: 3680
- Area code: 031

Cato Ridge is a town in the KwaZulu-Natal province of South Africa named after George Christopher Cato (1814–1893), the first mayor of Durban. Organisationally and administratively it is included in the Ethekwini Metropolitan Municipality as a suburb of the Outer West region.

== Geography ==
Situated in the Valley of a Thousand Hills, Cato Ridge is the westernmost town of the eThekwini Metropolitan Municipality (Greater Durban metropolitan area) and is actually closer to the city of Pietermaritzburg, 30 km (19 mi) north-west than the city of Durban, 50 km (31 mi) south-east.

== Transport ==
Cato Ridge lies on the N3 freeway which passes the small town to the north, leading north-west to Camperdown and Pietermaritzburg and south-east to Pinetown and Durban. In passing Cato Ridge it gives access to the small town through the R103 interchange (exit 53).

Local arterial routes through Cato Ridge include: The R103 regional route leading eastwards to Camperdown and Pietermaritzburg and westwards to Inchanga and Hillcrest and the M50 metropolitan route leading south-east to Mpumalanga.
