= R617 (South Africa) =

Regional route in South Africa

Regional route R617

Route information
- Length: 221 km (137 mi)

Major junctions
- North-east end: N3 / R103 near Howick
- R612 near Bulwer
- South-west end: R56 in Kokstad

Location
- Country: South Africa

Highway system
- Numbered routes of South Africa
← R616	→ R618

The R617 is a Regional Route in South Africa that connects Howick with Kokstad via Bulwer, Underberg and Franklin.

== Route ==
Its north-eastern terminus is the N3 at Howick. It initially runs south-west, along the southern shore of Midmar Dam. It wends west-south-west passing through Bulwer. Just after Bulwer, it intersects with the northern terminus of the R612. After that intersection, it heads west to the town of Underberg. Passing through Underberg, it leaves to the west before wending first south-south-west then west to reach Franklin. South of Franklin, the route ends in Kokstad at an intersection with the R56.
