= Bertie van Renen =

South African rugby union player (b. 1880, d. 1942)

- Born: William Adrian van Renen; 29 August 1880 Cape Town, South Africa
- Died: 17 February 1942 (aged 61)
- School: Bishops
- Notable relative: Charlie van Renen (Brother)

Rugby union career
- Position: Utility Back
Provincial / State sides
Years	Team	Apps	(Points)
1903	Western Province	0	(0)
International career
Years	Team	Apps	(Points)
1903	South Africa	2	(0)
- Correct as of 1 June 2019

Bertie van Renen ( 29 August 1880 – 17 February 1942) was a South African international rugby union player who played as a utility back.

He made 2 appearances for South Africa against the British Lions in 1903.
