= R602 (South Africa) =

Regional route in South Africa

Regional route R602

Location
- Country: South Africa

Highway system
- Numbered routes of South Africa
← R600	→ R603

The R602 is a Regional Route in South Africa.

== Route ==
Its north-eastern terminus is Dundee at an intersection with the R68. It initially heads west, to the twin town of Glencoe. It then runs south-west, bypassing Wasbank, to end at an intersection with the N11 between Ladysmith and Newcastle.
