= Llandaff Oratory =

Chapel in South Africa

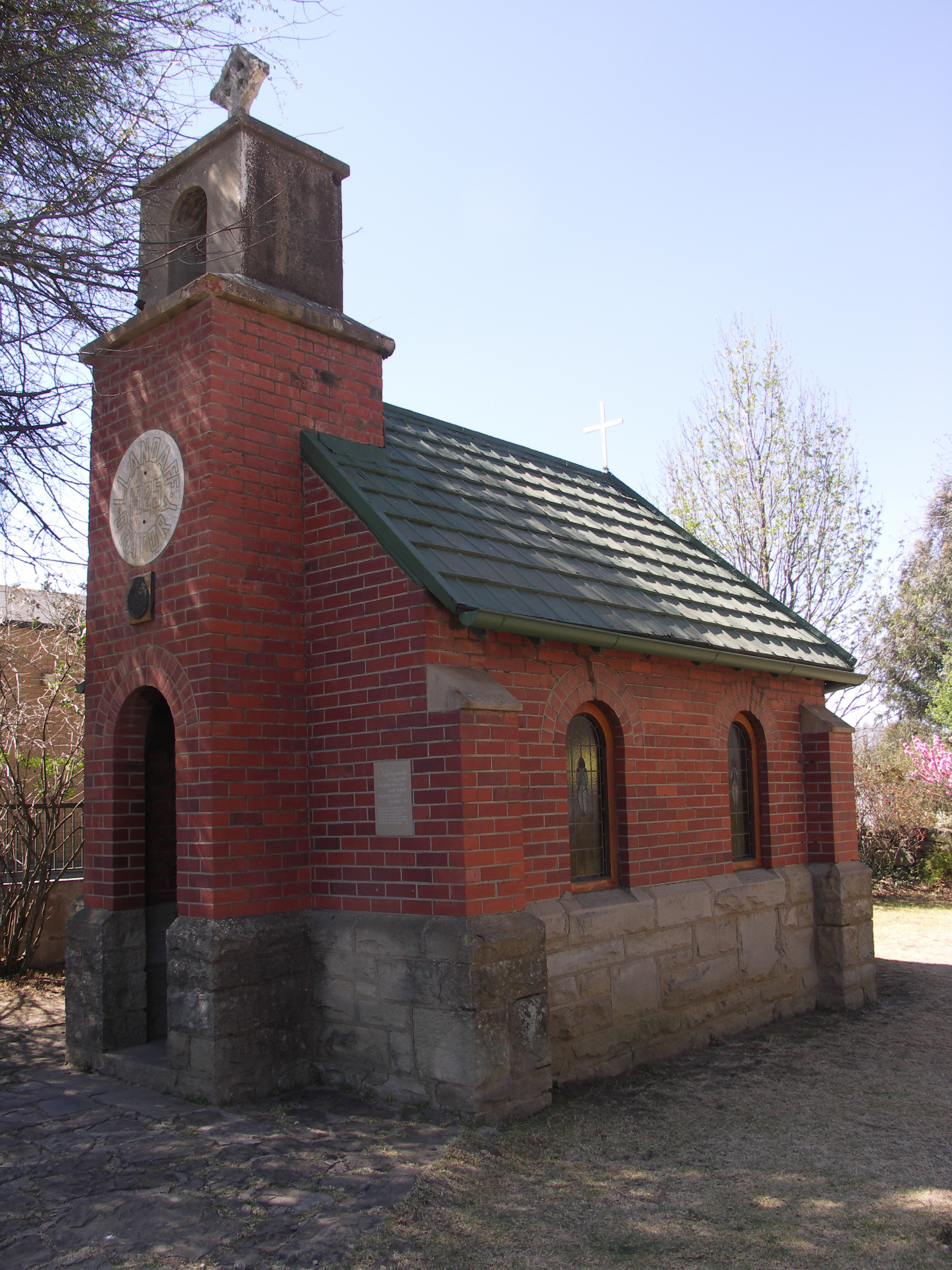
- Llandaff Oratory

Religion
- Affiliation: Roman Catholic Church
- Ecclesiastical or organisational status: Oratory

Location
- Location: Van Reenen (Uthukela District Municipality), South Africa
- Interactive map of Llandaff Oratory
- Coordinates: 28.3767°S 29.3786°E

Llandaff Oratory is an oratory in Van Reenen, KwaZulu-Natal, South Africa. The oratory was built by Maynard Mathew in memory of his son Llandaff Mathew who died as a result of injuries received while saving the life of a colleague at the Burnside Colliery on 19 March 1925.

== History ==
It is possible that Maynard Mathew wanted to erect a plaque in honour of his son at the Roman Catholic Church in Ladysmith, but could not secure permission to do so, but there is no evidence to support this. Determined that a memorial to his son should be placed in a church, Maynard decided to build his own, have it consecrated a Catholic church and he became a Tertiary in the Dominicans on 7 May 1926 in order to serve in the church himself.

== Architecture ==
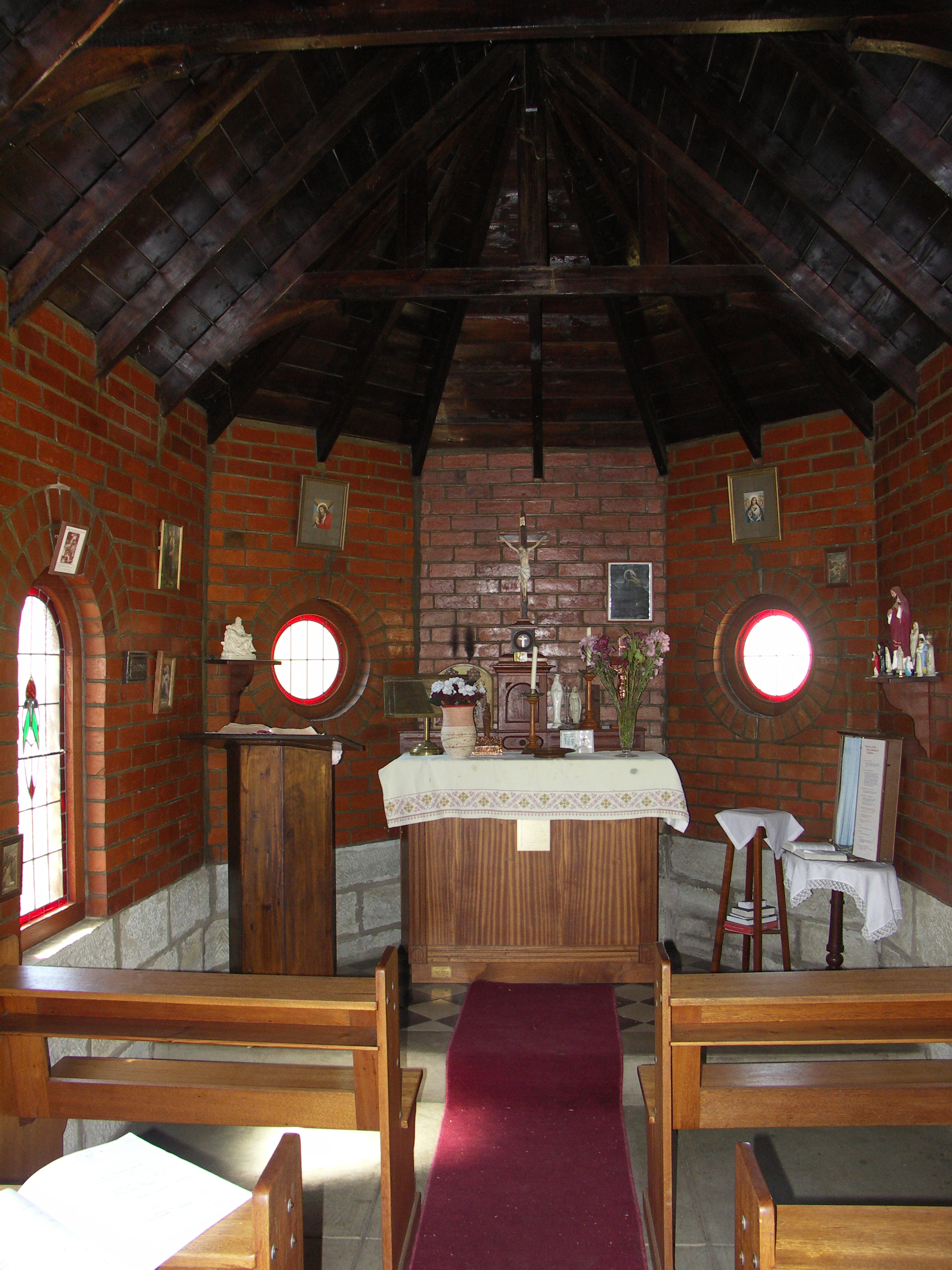
Oratory interior

The oratory seats just eight people: his parents and three surviving siblings and their spouses formed the original eight. There is no evidence to support the long-held view that the church is architecturally based on a wing of Cardiff Cathedral in Wales.

The Oratory is a Heritage Landmark (formerly called a National Monument).

== See also ==
- Cardiff Cathedral
