= Mkhambathini Local Municipality =

Mkhambathini
- Local municipality
- Location in KwaZulu-Natal
- Coordinates: 29°43′S 30°31′E
- Country: South Africa
- Province: KwaZulu-Natal
- District: uMgungundlovu
- Seat: Camperdown
- Wards: 10

Government
  - Type: Municipal council

Area
  - Total: 891 km^{2} (344 sq mi)

Population (2011)
  - Total: 63,142
  - Density: 70.9/km^{2} (184/sq mi)

Racial makeup (2011)
  - Black African: 94.8%
  - Coloured: 0.3%
  - Indian/Asian: 1.0%
  - White: 3.7%

First languages (2011)
  - Zulu: 84.8%
  - Xhosa: 5.1%
  - English: 4.9%
  - Sotho: 1.9%
  - Other: 3.3%
- Time zone: UTC+2 (SAST)
- Municipal code: KZN226

Mkhambathini Municipality (Zulu: UMasipala wase Mkhambathini) is a local municipality within the Umgungundlovu District Municipality, in the KwaZulu-Natal province of South Africa. Mkhabathini is an isiZulu word derived from eMkhambathini meaning "the place of acacia trees".

The municipality is well located in relation to Durban and Pietermaritzburg and adjoins Cato Ridge, a potential industrial node. The N3, which is identified in the Spatial Growth and Development Strategy as a provincial corridor, runs east–west through the central part of the municipal area.

== Main places ==
The 2001 census divided the municipality into the following main places:

Place	Code	Area (km^{2})	Population
Camperdown	51201	2.19	799
Embo	51202	145.40	18,615
Ilanga	51203	2.15	2,378
Macala	51204	15.01	450
Mapumulu	51205	54.95	8,857
Mdluli	51206	58.85	11,477
Remainder of the municipality	51207	638.19	16,489

== Politics ==
The municipal council consists of nineteen members elected by mixed-member proportional representation. Ten councillors are elected by first-past-the-post voting in ten wards, while the remaining nine are chosen from party lists so that the total number of party representatives is proportional to the number of votes received.

In the election of 4 November 2026, no party won a majority. The African National Congress (ANC) won the largest number of seats on the council, with eight.

The following table shows the results of the 2026 election.

Party	Ward			List			Total seats
Party	Votes	%	Seats	Votes	%	Seats	Total seats
African National Congress	10,734	39.91	5	10,655	39.60	3	8
uMkhonto weSizwe Party	9,753	36.26	5	10,062	37.39	2	7
Inkatha Freedom Party	3,724	13.85	0	3,740	13.90	3	3
Democratic Alliance	935	3.48	0	951	3.53	1	1
Independent candidates	172	0.64	0				0
8 other parties	1,576	5.86	0	1,500	5.57	0	0
Total	26,894	100.00	10	26,908	100.00	9	19
Valid votes	26,894	98.57		26,908	98.39		
Invalid/blank votes	391	1.43		440	1.61		
Total votes	27,285	100.00		27,348	100.00		
Registered voters/turnout	44,593	61.19		44,593	61.33		
