= Lars Georg Svensson =

American cardiologist

Lars Georg Svensson is a cardiac surgeon and the chairman of the heart and vascular institute at Cleveland Clinic. He is the Director of the Aorta Center, Director of the Marfan Syndrome and Connective Tissue Disorder Clinic, and is a professor of surgery at Cleveland Clinic Lerner College of Medicine and Case Western Reserve University. He is also the Director of Quality Outcomes and Process Improvement for the Department of Thoracic and Cardiovascular Surgery and Affiliate Cardiac Surgery Program at Cleveland Clinic.

== Early life and education ==
Born in Barberton, South Africa, Svensson completed his high school studies at Treverton College in Mooi River, South Africa and earned his medical degree and Ph.D. from the University of Witwatersrand in Johannesburg.

He received his training in the fields of cardiology and general surgery at the Johannesburg Hospital. He completed a residency in cardiothoracic surgery at Baylor College of Medicine in Houston and completed fellowships at Baylor and Cleveland Clinic in Cleveland, Ohio.

== Career ==
Throughout his career, Svensson has contributed to the advances in the field of cardiovascular surgery.

Among Svensson's contributions include modifying the technically demanding operation of replacing the aortic arch (the "elephant procedure") to make it safer; extensive research on paralysis after aortic surgery that has led to reduction of paralysis risk to less than half; illustrated that certain methods of doing arch surgery can reduce the risk of stroke by 40%; illustrated techniques to reduce the risk of kidney failure after aortic surgery; simplified a method for preserving a patient's aortic valve and reimplanting it at the time of surgery so that patients (particularly young patients) do not require a valve replacement; developed a minimally invasive approach (the "J incision") for performing keyhole valve and aortic surgery; and has been involved from the beginning on the research of percutaneous aortic valves in transapical animal studies and the development of the randomized trials to prove the effectiveness and safety of percutaneous aortic valves. Svensson was also the first to do a replacement of the entire aorta during a single operation.

Svensson was named the King James IV Professor of Surgery of the Royal College of Surgeons of Edinburgh in 2005. He has also held academic appointments including Chief of Cardiothoracic Surgery at the Veterans Administration Hospital in Houston; Clinical Instructor in Surgery at Harvard Medical School; Clinical Professor of Cardiothoracic Surgery at Tufts University in Boston; and Assistant Professor of Surgery at Baylor College of Medicine.

He has authored the reference text book "Cardiovascular and Vascular Diseases of the Aorta" and has authored or co-authored hundreds of journal articles, reviews, book chapters, abstracts, and commentaries. He has been invited to lecture at hundreds of regional, national, and international symposia and conferences. He is the former associate editor of the Annals of Thoracic Surgery. He also serves on several editorial boards, including the Journal of Thoracic and Cardiovascular Surgery, Journal for Minimal Invasive Cardiac Surgery, Journal of Cardiac Surgery, and the Annals of Cardiovascular and Thoracic Surgery.

Svensson is a fellow of the Royal College of Surgeons of Edinburgh, the Colleges of Medicine of South Africa, the Royal College of Surgeons of Canada in Vascular and Cardiothoracic Surgery, the American College of Surgeons, the American College of Cardiology, and the American College of Physician Executives. In addition, he is an active member of several other professional organizations, including the DeBakey International Society.
