= Warden, Free State =

Warden
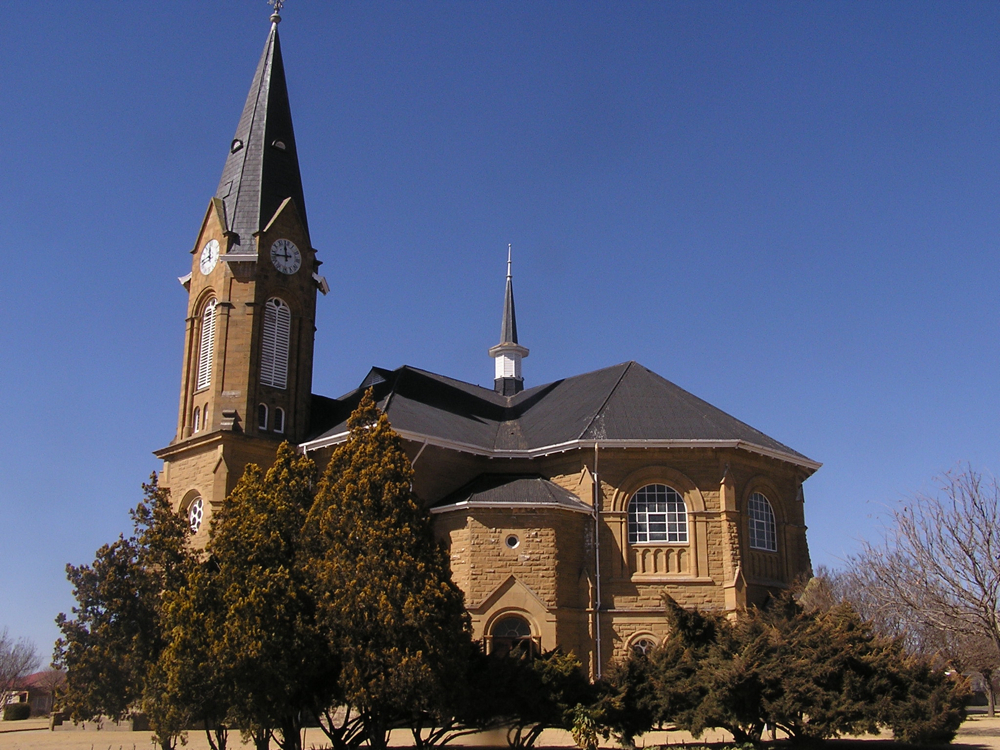
- Dutch Reformed Church in Warden.

- Location within Free State (South African province) Location within South Africa
- Coordinates: 27°51′14″S 28°58′00″E
- Country: South Africa
- Province: Free State
- District: Thabo Mofutsanyane
- Municipality: Phumelela

Area
  - Total: 17.0 km^{2} (6.6 sq mi)

Population (2011)
  - Total: 10,977
  - Density: 646/km^{2} (1,670/sq mi)

Racial makeup (2011)
  - Black African: 92.1%
  - Coloured: 0.4%
  - Indian/Asian: 0.5%
  - White: 6.4%
  - Other: 0.5%

First languages (2011)
  - Zulu: 62.9%
  - Sotho: 25.2%
  - Afrikaans: 7.2%
  - English: 1.6%
  - Other: 3.0%
- Time zone: UTC+2 (SAST)
- Postal code (street): 9890
- PO box: 9890
- Area code: 058

Warden is a town situated in the Free State province of South Africa on the N3 highway between Johannesburg and Durban.

The town is 56 km north of Harrismith and 106 kilometres (66 mi) south-south-east of Villiers. It was laid out on the farm Rietvlei in 1912, proclaimed in 1913, and attained municipal status in 1920. It is said to be named after Charles Frederick Warden, landdrost of Harrismith from 1884 to 1900.

Warden and Dirkie Uys School celebrated their centenary during September 2013. The town has one of the largest Dutch Reformed Churches in South Africa, with seating for 1,750.

After the African National Congress came into power in 1994, the town's infrastructure deteriorated. Most roads are now unpaved and most public buildings have been in decline. A young group of residents took part in restoring Warden. A new main road and several buildings has since been built or upgraded. One of the biggest municipal dams is also being built. Warden's locality (in the middle of SA and on the N3 highway connecting Gauteng and Durban), water supply, industrial land and labour makes it an ideal place for industrial development. Houses in Warden are reasonably priced. Industrial and residential land are also available.

The farming area around Warden produces a big part of the country's potatoes, maize and red meat.

== Notable residents ==
- Theo Beyleveldt (1948–2011), South African politician and retired military officer
