= Pietermaritzburg Ring Road =

Ring Road in South Africa

Pietermaritzburg Ring Road

Route information
- Length: 9.1 km (5.7 mi)
- Existed: 2017–present

Major junctions
- Ring road around Pietermaritzburg
- North end: R103 near Athlone
- South end: R56 near Scottsville

Location
- Country: South Africa

Highway system
- Numbered routes of South Africa

The Pietermaritzburg Ring Road, also known as the Pietermaritzburg Bypass, is a halfway ring road that circles the city of Pietermaritzburg, South Africa. It is part of the N3 National Route.

== Route ==
The half ring road is part of the N3 freeway. The 9 km half ring road follows east around Pietermaritzburg (bypassing the city centre). It starts at the R103 split in the northern suburb of Athlone and ends at the R56 merge in the southern suburb of Scottsville.

== See also ==
- Ring roads in South Africa
