= Ashburton, KwaZulu-Natal =

Ashburton
- Location within KwaZulu-Natal Location within South Africa
- Coordinates: 29.666°S 30.454°E
- Country: South Africa
- Province: KwaZulu-Natal
- District: uMgungundlovu
- Municipality: Msunduzi

Area
  - Total: 8.58 km^{2} (3.31 sq mi)

Population (2011)
  - Total: 2,220
  - Density: 259/km^{2} (670/sq mi)

Racial makeup (2011)
  - Black African: 51.8%
  - Coloured: 2.5%
  - Indian/Asian: 6.3%
  - White: 39.0%
  - Other: 0.4%

First languages (2011)
  - Zulu: 41.4%
  - English: 40.0%
  - Afrikaans: 14.0%
  - Xhosa: 2.5%
  - Other: 2.1%
- Time zone: UTC+2 (SAST)
- Postal code (street): 3201
- PO box: 3213

Ashburton is a town in Msunduzi Local Municipality in the KwaZulu-Natal province of South Africa. It is situated next to the N3 about 12 km east of Pietermaritzburg.
