= Charlie van Renen =

South African rugby union player

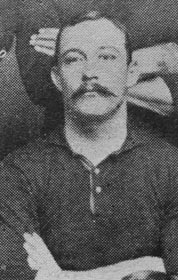
- Born: Charles Gerhard van Renen; 23 August 1868 Constantia, Cape Town, South Africa
- Died: 20 July 1942 (aged 73) Retreat, Cape Town, South Africa
- School: Diocesan College
- Notable relative: Bertie van Renen (brother)

Rugby union career
- Position: Forward
Provincial / State sides
Years	Team	Apps	(Points)
- Western Province
International career
Years	Team	Apps	(Points)
1891–1896	South Africa	3	(0)

Charlie van Renen (23 August 1868 – 20 July 1942) was a South African international rugby union player. Born in Constantia, Cape Town, he attended Diocesan College before playing provincial rugby for Western Province. He made three appearances for South Africa, all against the British Isles, one match during the 1891 tour and two in 1896. Van Renen died in 1942, in Retreat, Cape Town, at the age of 73. His brother, Bertie, also played rugby union for South Africa.
