= Polokwane Ring Road =

Ring Road in South Africa

Polokwane Ring Road

Route information
- Length: 22.4 km (13.9 mi)
- Existed: 2020–present

Major junctions
- Ring road around Polokwane
- North end: N1/ R101 Polokwane Bypass Merge
- R81 near Northview; R71 near Polokwane (ext 28); R37 near Polokwane (ext 30)
- South end: N1/ R101 Polokwane Bypass Split

Location
- Country: South Africa

Highway system
- Numbered routes of South Africa

The Polokwane Ring Road, also known as the Polokwane Eastern Ring Road, is a halfway ring road that circles the city of Polokwane, South Africa. It is part of the N1 national route.

== Route ==
The ring road was opened in late 2020 and cost an estimated R800 million. The ring road is part of the N1 freeway. It begins at the N1 and R101 split (south-west of the city centre), and runs north-east around Polokwane. It crosses the R37, then the R71 and finally the R81. The ring road then comes to an end at the N1 and R101 merge (north of the city centre). This forms the half ring road around Polokwane.

== See also ==
- Ring roads in South Africa
