= Metropolitan routes in Pietermaritzburg =

Pietermaritzburg, like most South African cities, uses metropolitan or "M" routes for important intra-city roads. These routes are a tier below national (N) roads and regional (R) roads. Each city's M roads are independently numbered.

In South Africa, Metropolitan or "M" routes are mostly used in metropolitan municipalities. Pietermaritzburg is the only exception, as it is not part of a metropolitan municipality yet still uses these road designations.

== Table of M roads ==
| No. | Direction | Description of route | Suburbs | Street names | Other |
|---|---|---|---|---|---|
| M10 | North/South | R33 (Mountain Rise) – R33 (Bombay Heights) | Mountain Rise, Allandale, Raisethorpe, Bombay Heights | Chota Motala Rd | |
| M20 | East/West then North/South | M80 (Pietermaritzburg CBD) – M70 – M30 - N3 – M30 - R33 (Mountain Rise) | Pietermaritzburg CBD, Willowton, Mountain Rise | Masukwana St, Ohrtmann Rd | |
| M30 | North/South | M20 (Pietermaritzburg CBD) - M20 - M20 - R33 (Copesville) | Pietermaritzburg CBD, Willowton, Mountain Rise, Eastwood, Panorama. Whispers, Copesville | Larch Rd, Manning Ave, Chief Mhlabunzima Rd, Copesville Dr | |
| M40 | North/South | R56 (Scottsville) – M70 – M80 – N3 (Northern Park) | Scottsville, Pietermaritzburg CBD, Northern Park | Boshoff St, Chatterton Rd | |
| M50 | East/West | M70 (Masons Hill) – R56 – R103 (Mkondeni) | Masons Hill, Ridge Park, Westgate, Hazelmere, Oribi Heights, Bisley Heights, Murrayfield Park, Mkondeni | Archie Gumede Rd, Gladys Manzi Rd | |
| M70 | East/West | R617 (near Boston Park) – M50 – R103 – M40 – M20 – N3/R33 (Willowton) | Elandskop, Taylor's Halt, Zibomvini, Draaihoek, Dambuza, Dlaba, Edendale Town, Mason's Mill, Camp's Drift, Pietermaritzburg CBD, Willowton | Selby Msimang Rd, Church St | |
| M80 | East/West then North/South | M20 (Pietermaritzburg CBD) – M40 – R103 (cosigned) – R103 – N3 – ends near Hilton College | Pietermaritzburg CBD, Prestbury, Lester Park, Boughton, Sweet Waters, Winterskloof, Mount Michael, Mountain Home, Hilton CBD, Hilton Gardens | Hoosen Haffajee St / Pietermaritz St, Mayors Wk, Zwartkop Rd, Mbubu Rd, Sweetwaters Rd, Dennis Shepstone Dr, Hilton Ave | |

== See also ==
- Numbered routes in South Africa
