= Van Reenen =

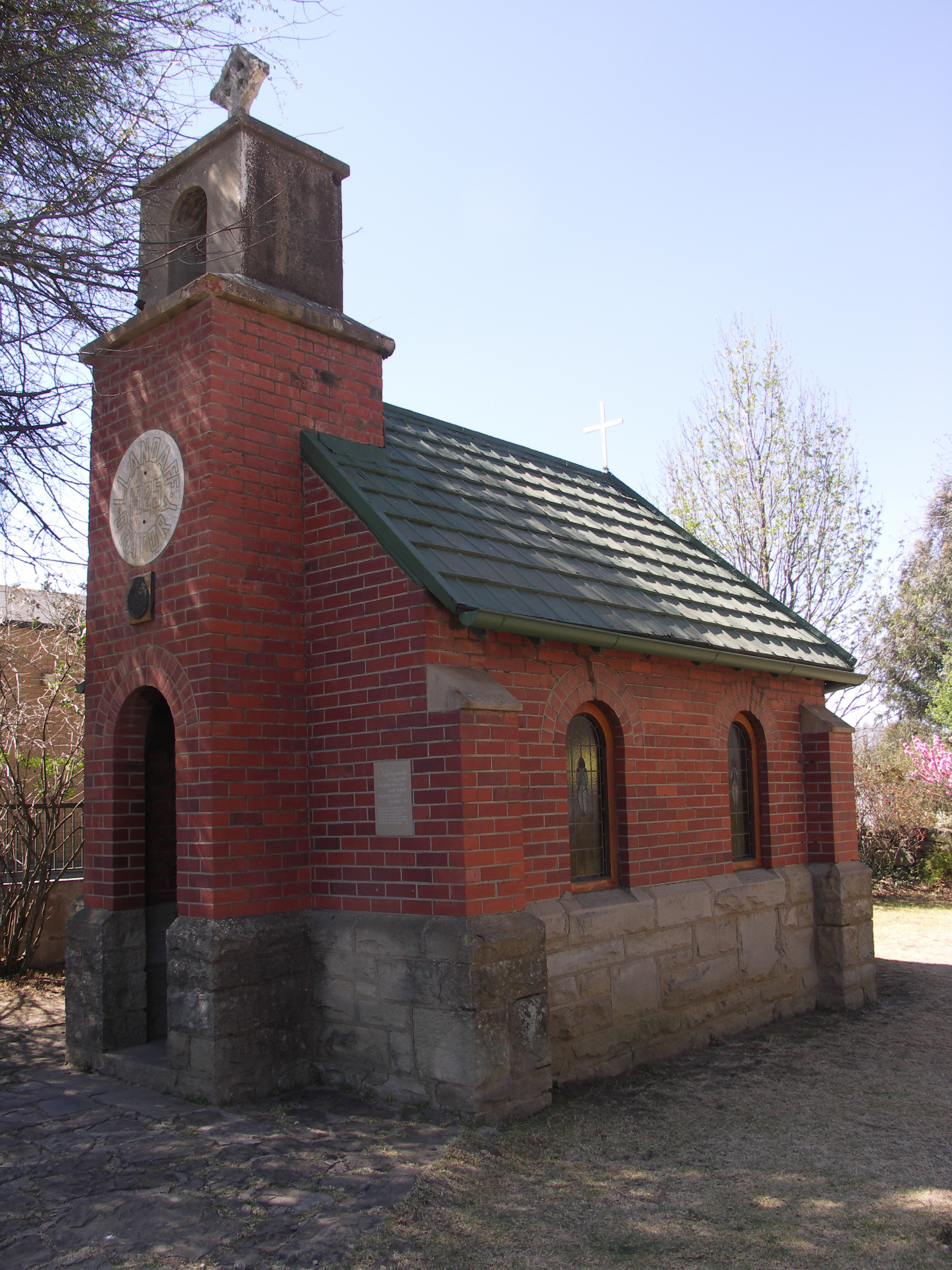
- Llandaff Oratory in Van Reenen

- Location within KwaZulu-Natal Location within South Africa
- Coordinates: 28.376°S 29.381°E
- Country: South Africa
- Province: KwaZulu-Natal
- District: Uthukela
- Municipality: Alfred Duma

Area
  - Total: 0.48 km^{2} (0.19 sq mi)
- Elevation: 1,680 m (5,510 ft)

Population (2001)
  - Total: 78
  - Density: 160/km^{2} (420/sq mi)

Racial makeup (2001)
  - Black African: 73.1%
  - Indian/Asian: 11.5%
  - White: 15.4%

First languages (2001)
  - Zulu: 46.2%
  - Sotho: 26.9%
  - English: 23.1%
  - Afrikaans: 3.8%
- Time zone: UTC+2 (SAST)
- PO box: 3372
- Area code: 058

Van Reenen is a settlement in Uthukela District Municipality in the KwaZulu-Natal province of South Africa. It is located on the N3 national road at the top of Van Reenen's Pass on the Great Escarpment of the Drakensberg. The town is named after Frans van Reenen, original owner of the farm where Van Reenen was established and planner of the route of the Van Reenen's Pass.

Llandaff Oratory, an eight-seat memorial church built around 1925, is a Heritage Landmark.

The Moorddraai ('Murder corner' in Afrikaans) memorial a few kilometres to the south-east of the town marks the place where nine people transporting goods from Durban were killed by Basotho tribesmen in 1865.

== Gallery ==
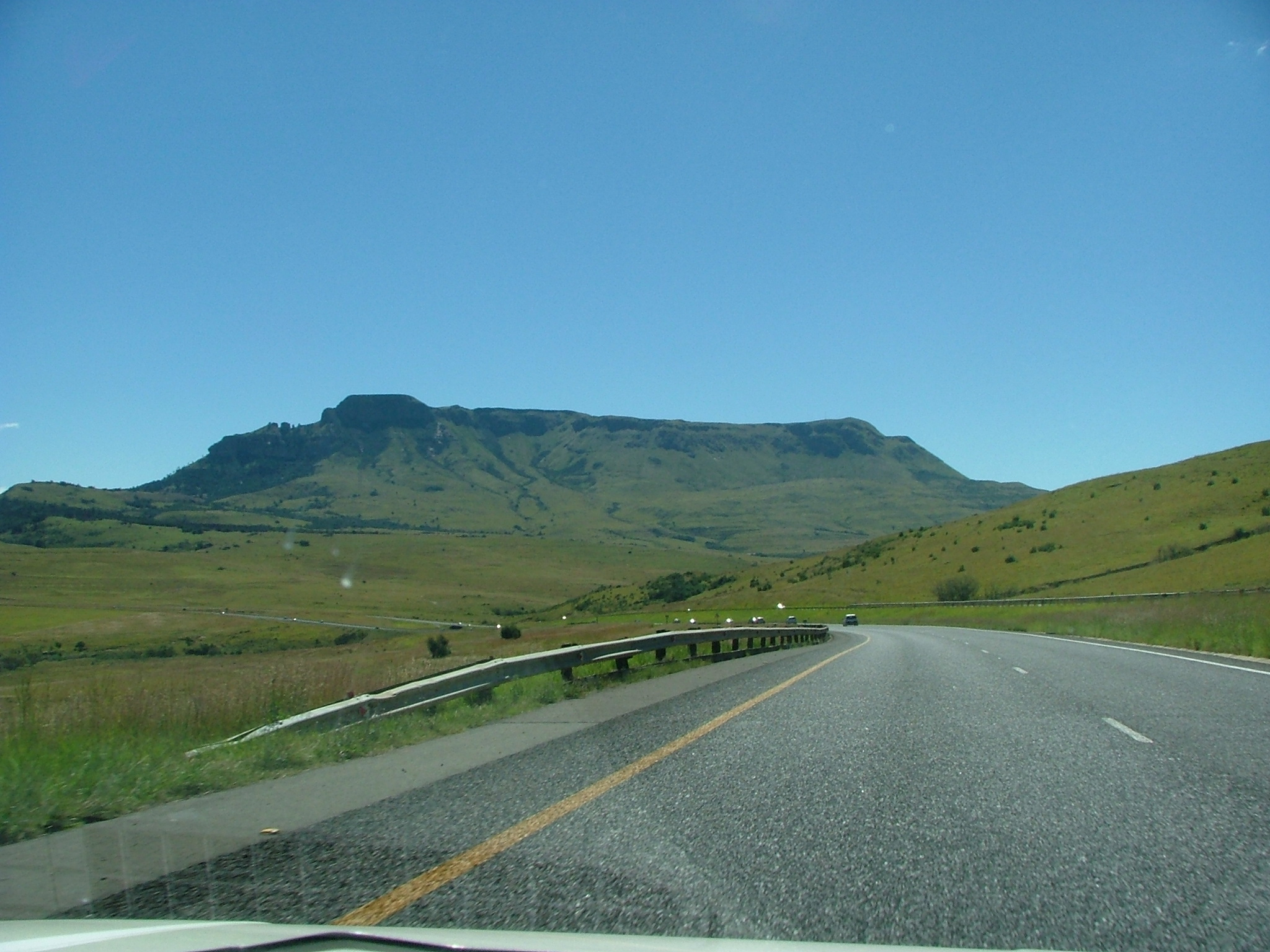
Van Reenen's Pass

== Climate ==
Climate data for Van Reenan, elevation 1,680 m (5,510 ft), (1991–2020 normals, extremes 1998–2023)
Month	Jan	Feb	Mar	Apr	May	Jun	Jul	Aug	Sep	Oct	Nov	Dec	Year
Record high °C (°F)	36.7 (98.1)	32.4 (90.3)	32.5 (90.5)	34.6 (94.3)	30.0 (86.0)	26.9 (80.4)	28.9 (84.0)	31.1 (88.0)	34.8 (94.6)	33.9 (93.0)	34.2 (93.6)	35.7 (96.3)	36.7 (98.1)
Mean daily maximum °C (°F)	26.3 (79.3)	25.6 (78.1)	25.0 (77.0)	22.5 (72.5)	20.8 (69.4)	18.6 (65.5)	18.4 (65.1)	21.3 (70.3)	24.9 (76.8)	25.2 (77.4)	25.4 (77.7)	26.8 (80.2)	23.4 (74.1)
Daily mean °C (°F)	19.9 (67.8)	19.6 (67.3)	18.4 (65.1)	15.5 (59.9)	12.5 (54.5)	10.3 (50.5)	9.7 (49.5)	12.5 (54.5)	16.1 (61.0)	17.5 (63.5)	18.0 (64.4)	20.0 (68.0)	15.8 (60.5)
Mean daily minimum °C (°F)	13.5 (56.3)	13.5 (56.3)	11.8 (53.2)	8.5 (47.3)	4.1 (39.4)	1.9 (35.4)	0.9 (33.6)	3.8 (38.8)	7.3 (45.1)	9.8 (49.6)	10.7 (51.3)	13.1 (55.6)	8.2 (46.8)
Record low °C (°F)	6.2 (43.2)	7.1 (44.8)	−0.3 (31.5)	−2.4 (27.7)	−7.5 (18.5)	−7.6 (18.3)	−9.5 (14.9)	−7.2 (19.0)	−6.0 (21.2)	0.2 (32.4)	1.1 (34.0)	5.8 (42.4)	−9.5 (14.9)
Average precipitation mm (inches)	183.0 (7.20)	158.8 (6.25)	122.2 (4.81)	49.5 (1.95)	21.5 (0.85)	13.0 (0.51)	13.8 (0.54)	24.5 (0.96)	53.5 (2.11)	99.7 (3.93)	123.7 (4.87)	148.4 (5.84)	1,011.6 (39.82)
Average precipitation days (≥ 0.25 mm)	1.9	1.8	1.4	0.4	0.2	0.1	0.1	0.3	0.6	0.8	1.1	1.6	10.3
Source: Starlings Roost Weather (precipitation 1913–2023)
