= Winterton, South Africa =

Winterton
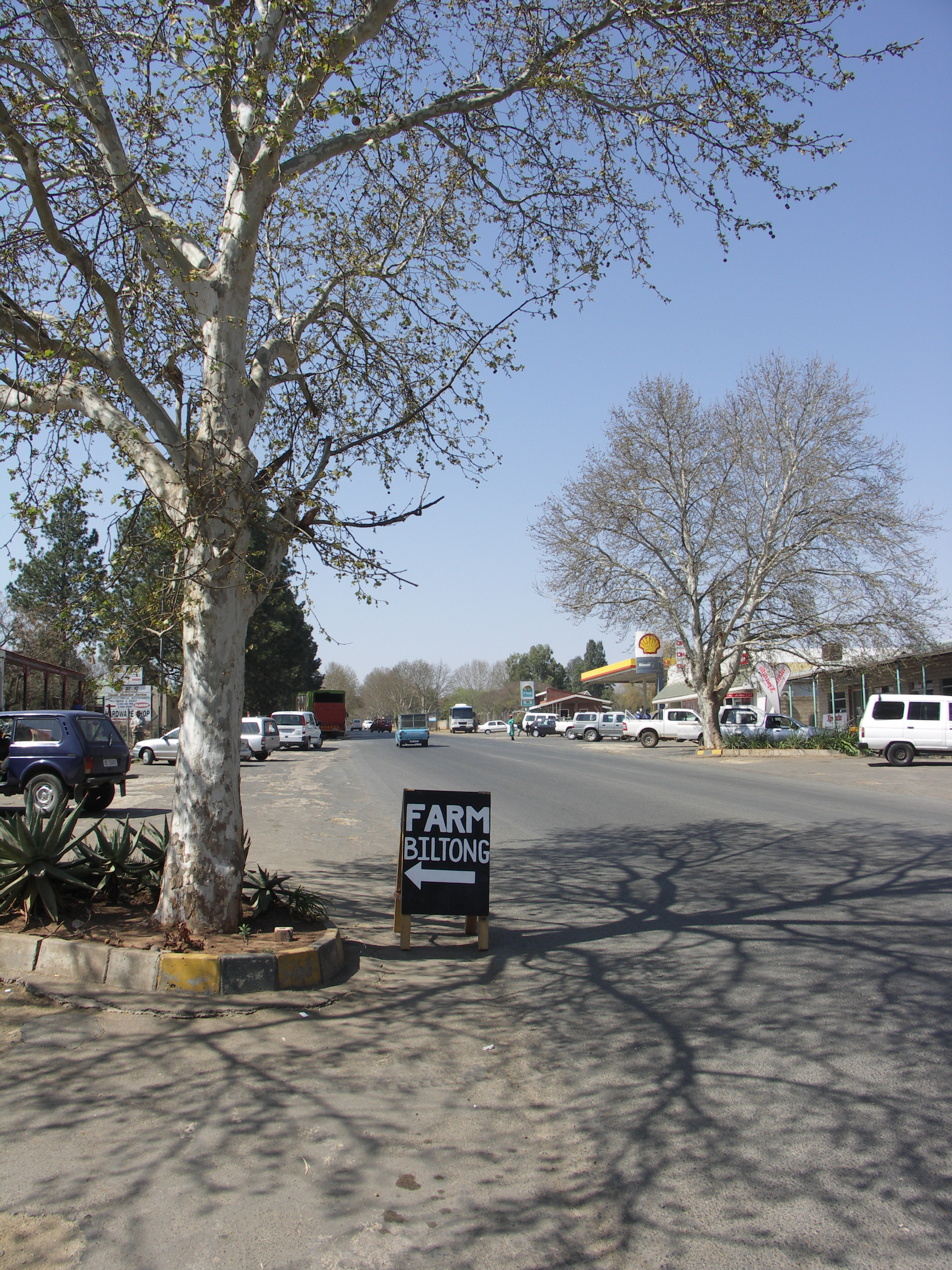
- Main road in Winterton

- Location within KwaZulu-Natal Location within South Africa
- Coordinates: 28°48′48″S 29°32′10″E
- Country: South Africa
- Province: KwaZulu-Natal
- District: uThukela
- Municipality: Okhahlamba

Area
  - Total: 0.86 km^{2} (0.33 sq mi)

Population (2022)
  - Total: 276
  - Density: 320/km^{2} (830/sq mi)

Racial makeup (2022)
  - Black African: 18.8%
  - Coloured: 0.4%
  - Indian/Asian: 3.6%
  - White: 74.0%
  - Other: 2.2%

First languages (2022)
  - Afrikaans: 48.7%
  - English: 30.3%
  - Zulu: 13.9%
  - Other: 6.0%
- Time zone: UTC+2 (SAST)
- Postal code (street): 3340
- PO box: 3340
- Area code: 036

Winterton is a small town on the banks of the Tugela River in the foothills of the Drakensberg mountains, KwaZulu-Natal, South Africa. It was founded in 1905 as Springfield when the Natal Government built a weir across the Little Tugela River. The town later changed its name to Winterton in honour of the secretary for agriculture, HD Winter. Winterton is a small town with only a primary school. It is close to the Second Boer War sites of the Battle of Vaal Krantz and the Spioenkop.

The town is situated on the R74 between Bergville and the N3, as well as the R600 between Ladysmith and the Central Drakensberg.

Winterton also serves as an entry point to the Champagne Valley as well as the Cathedral area of the central Drakensberg, with well known mountain peaks of Champagne Castle and Cathedral Peak respectively - these mountains are considered to be among the most spectacular sights in Southern Africa.

The world-famous Drakensberg Boys' Choir School is outside the town, just about 30 kilometres (19 mi) south-southwest of Winterton. The town has also grown to become a popular tourist destination, for South Africans and foreigners alike.
