= R621 (South Africa) =

Regional route in South Africa

Regional route R621

Location
- Country: South Africa

Highway system
- Numbered routes of South Africa
← R620	→ R622

The R621 is a Regional Route in South Africa.

== Route ==
Its north-western terminus is the N11 between Ladysmith and Newcastle. It initially heads east, to Dannhauser. Leaving the town, it heads south-east, and passes through Hattingspruit before ending at an intersection with the R68 just north of Dundee.
