= Fort Nottingham =

Fort in the KwaZulu-Natal Midlands, South Africa

Coordinates: 29.417788°S 29.906136°E

- Part of British colonial military outposts
- KwaZulu-Natal Midlands, South Africa

Site information
- Type: Military fort
- Controlled by: British Empire
- Open to the public: Yes
- Condition: Preserved (partially)

Site history
- Built: 1856
- Built by: 45th Regiment of Foot (British Army)
- In use: 1856–late 19th century
- Materials: Stone, wood
- Battles/wars: Cattle raids and frontier skirmishes

Garrison information
- Garrison: 45th Regiment

Fort Nottingham is a fort in the KwaZulu-Natal Midlands of South Africa, established in 1856. The garrison was originally developed as a post to protect British settlers in the foothills of the Drakensberg Mountains from livestock theft by the local San people.

The first recorded white hunter / traders arrived at the Bay at Port Natal in 1824. 20 years later, an English settler elite had formed in Durban Natal had been annexed by the British in 1843. Most of the Boers in the Natal Midlands had sold all their farms or terminated their leases and moved north to avoid British rule in the Crown Colony of Natal. Land grants had been offered to English migrants to form an agricultural population. These new settlers loyalty to the British Empire assisted with propping up the colonial state.

Livestock raiding and restitution activities have often shaped relations at the colonial frontier, and the midlands was no exception. Lieutenant-Governor, Col. H Cooper, requested in 1856 that a military outpost be established in the Midlands to protect these British migrants. The 45th Regiment erected a small fort and a cottage for the sergeant-major of the garrison. Soldiers pursued cattle thieves, recaptured livestock and took punitive actions. A small village was established and a buffer zone of 13,000 acres was demarcated between the Drakensberg and the Natal Midlands.
