= Van Reenen's Pass =

Mountain pass through the Drakensberg, South Africa

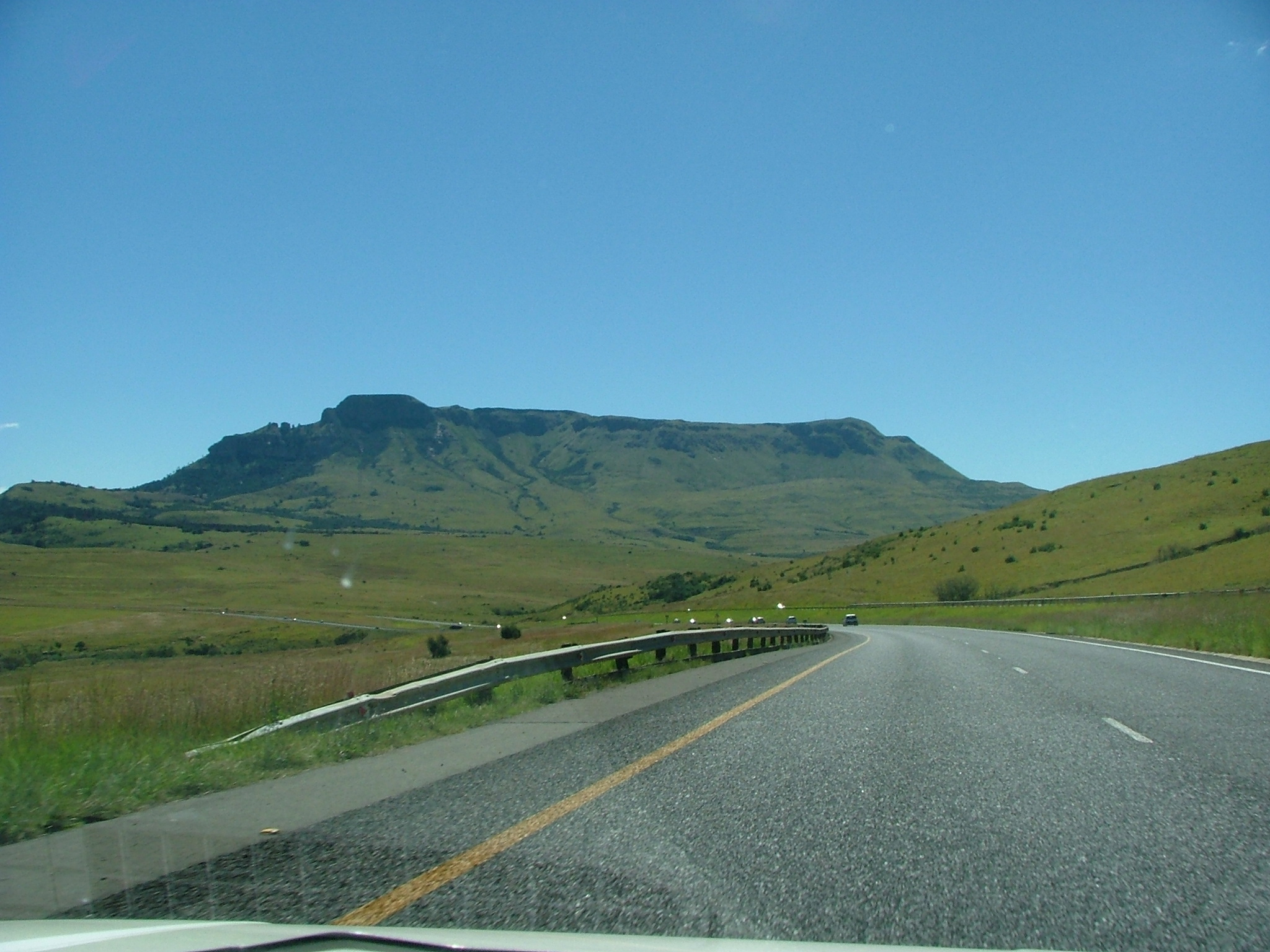
- Van Reenen's Pass
- Elevation: 1,690 m (5,540 ft)
- Traversed by: N3

Third Approach
- Location: Van Reenen, KwaZulu Natal, South Africa
- Range: Drakensberg
- Coordinates: 28°22′12″S 29°22′12″E

Van Reenen's Pass is a pass through the Drakensberg mountains in South Africa. The N3 freeway, the main road between Durban and Johannesburg, was constructed through the pass with the northern end of the pass lying at the border of the provinces of KwaZulu-Natal and the Free State. The village of Van Reenen sits atop the pass and the two nearest towns are Ladysmith and Harrismith, situated in the respective KwaZulu-Natal and Free State provinces.

== History ==
The pass is named after Frans van Reenen who owned the farm Sandspruit at the foot of the pass. In 1856, he helped plan a route for a road through the pass. The object of the pass was to open up trade between Natal and the Orange Free State. Van Reenen showed the engineers the route he used to move his livestock to the interior. A railroad followed in 1891. From 1953 to 1956, the existing road over the pass was rebuilt.
