= Frere, South Africa =

Frere
- Location within KwaZulu-Natal Location within South Africa
- Coordinates: 28.883°S 29.766°E
- Country: South Africa
- Province: KwaZulu-Natal
- District: uThukela
- Municipality: Inkosi Langalibalele

Area
  - Total: 9.36 km^{2} (3.61 sq mi)

Population (2011)
  - Total: 1,215
  - Density: 130/km^{2} (336/sq mi)

Racial makeup (2011)
  - Black African: 99.8%
  - Coloured: 0.1%
  - Indian/Asian: 0.1%
  - Other: 0.1%

First languages (2011)
  - Zulu: 94.9%
  - English: 2.1%
  - Other: 3.0%
- Time zone: UTC+2 (SAST)

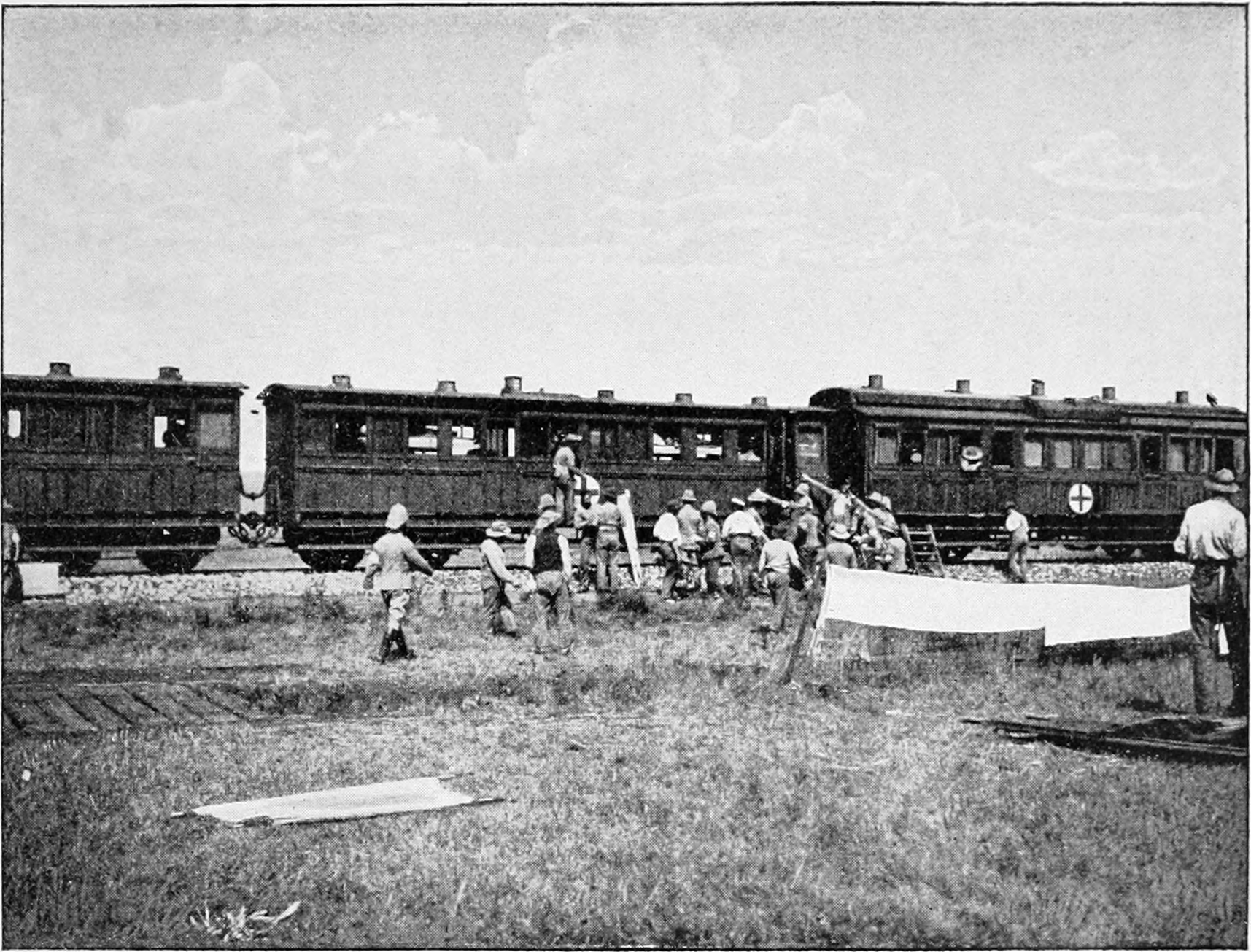

Frere is a town in Inkosi Langalibalele Local Municipality in the KwaZulu-Natal province of South Africa. The city is named for Sir Henry Bartle Frere, Governor of Cape Colony from 1877 to 1880. The city was for a time the headquarters of Sir Redvers Buller during the Second Boer War. The town is 25 km east of Winterton.

== Sources ==
- Erasmus, B.P.J. (1995). Op Pad in Suid-Afrika. Jonathan Ball Uitgewers. ISBN 1-86842-026-4.
