= Camperdown, South Africa =

Camperdown
- Location within KwaZulu-Natal Location within South Africa
- Coordinates: 29°44′S 30°32′E
- Country: South Africa
- Province: KwaZulu-Natal
- District: UMgungundlovu
- Municipality: Mkhambathini
- Established: 1865

Area
  - Total: 6.20 km^{2} (2.39 sq mi)

Population (2011)
  - Total: 2,101
  - Density: 339/km^{2} (878/sq mi)

Racial makeup (2011)
  - Black African: 51.4%
  - Coloured: 2.6%
  - Indian/Asian: 19.1%
  - White: 26.4%
  - Other: 0.6%

First languages (2011)
  - English: 45.5%
  - Zulu: 38.9%
  - Afrikaans: 6.2%
  - Sotho: 3.5%
  - Other: 5.9%
- Time zone: UTC+2 (SAST)
- PO box: 3720
- Area code: 031

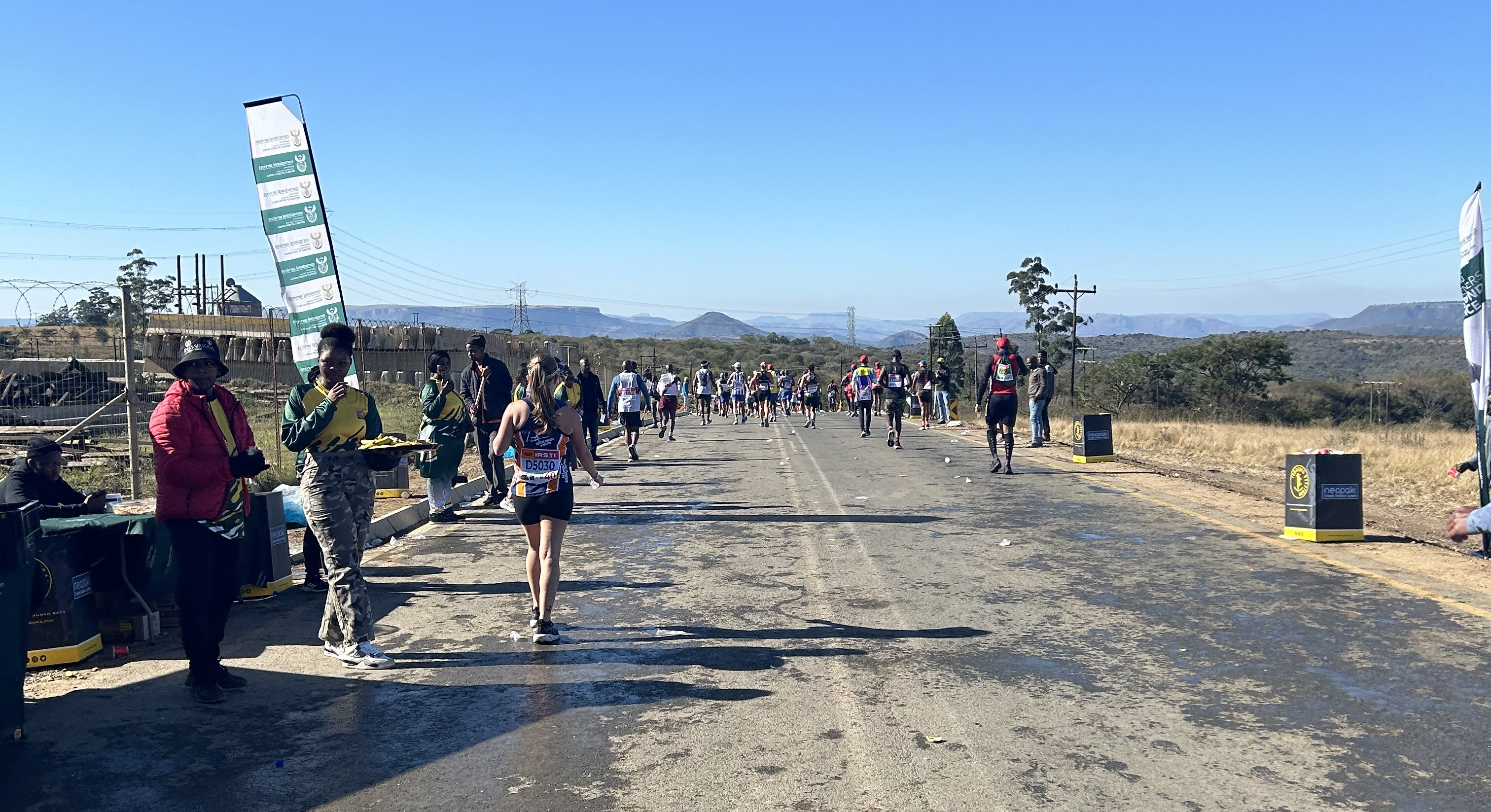
Runners in Camperdown during the 2024 Comrades Marathon

Camperdown is a settlement in Umgungundlovu District Municipality in the KwaZulu-Natal province of South Africa. It is approximately 60 km by road northwest of Durban and 20 km southeast of Pietermaritzburg. It was laid out in 1865 on the farm Camperdown, which was named to commemorate the victory of the British navy under Admiral Adam Duncan over the Dutch fleet under Admiral Jan Willem de Winter in October 1797.

== Economy ==
In the early 1840s, John Vanderplank's ship, the Louisa, arrived in Durban. It was named after his fiancée who refused to leave England to live as a married couple in Tasmania. He planted black wattle as a windbreak but they flourished to the point where they were trees rather than shrubs. After the discovery of tannic acid for use in the tanning industry, the wattle industry grew. Wattle wood was also later found suitable for pulp and paper manufacturing.

== Sources ==
- Erasmus, B.P.J. (1995). Op Pad in Suid-Afrika. Jonathan Ball Uitgewers. ISBN 1-86842-026-4.
- Rosenthal, Eric (1967). Ensiklopedie van Suidelike Afrika.
