= Mooi River (town) =

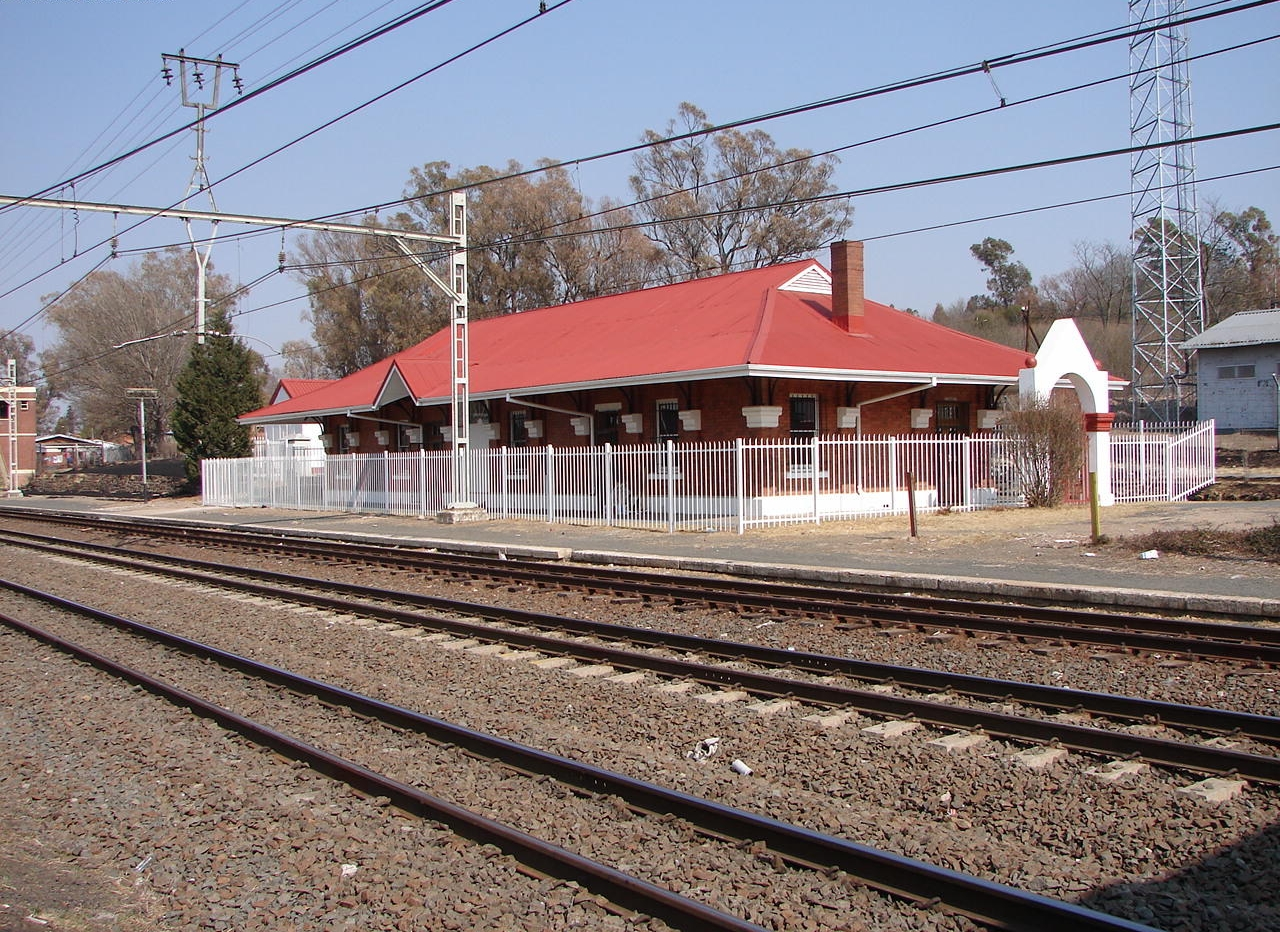
- Mooirivier railway station

- Location within KwaZulu-Natal Location within South Africa
- Coordinates: 29°12′S 29°59′E
- Country: South Africa
- Province: KwaZulu-Natal
- District: Umgungundlovu
- Municipality: Mpofana

Area
  - Total: 13.76 km^{2} (5.31 sq mi)
- Elevation: 1,393 m (4,570 ft)

Population (2011)
  - Total: 17,779
  - Density: 1,292/km^{2} (3,346/sq mi)

Racial makeup (2011)
  - Black African: 91.6%
  - Coloured: 1.0%
  - Indian/Asian: 3.5%
  - White: 3.6%
  - Other: 0.2%

First languages (2011)
  - Zulu: 82.75%
  - English: 7.8%
  - Afrikaans: 0.8%
  - Sotho: 0.8%
  - Other: 7.85%
- Time zone: UTC+2 (SAST)
- PO box: 3300
- Area code: 033

Mooi River (Zulu: eMpafana, Afrikaans: Mooirivier) is a small town situated at 1,389 m above sea level and 160 km from the coast in KwaZulu-Natal, South Africa. The first European settlement in the area was at Mooi River Drift in 1852. This was formally named Weston in 1866 after the first Governor of Natal, Martin West.

== History ==
In 1879, an Irishman named Alexander Lawrence purchased the Grantleigh farm upstream from Weston, on the banks of the Mooi River. Mooirivier is Afrikaans for "pretty river".

In 1884, the railway line from Durban on the coast, to Johannesburg in the interior, reached the area and was built across Alexander Lawrence's land. He subsequently laid out and established the village of Lawrenceville on his farm, Grantleigh, and so is known as "The Father of Mooi River". In 1921, the village was renamed Mooi River when it was declared a town.

== Geography ==
It lies on the N3 national road and rail routes between Johannesburg and Durban. Although the railway station is no longer used for passengers, goods are still being handled there. There is a toll plaza located on the N3 at Mooi River.

== Education ==
Six schools are serving the Mooi River municipal area with numerous others further from town that serve the traditional farm labourer communities. The six main schools are:

- Treverton Preparatory School and College, a private school of about 600 students. In the hills of the small game park within Treverton, there lie some trenches used in the Boer wars. From these the Boers observed English movements at Weston, their remount depot.
- Weston Agricultural College, a public agricultural school of good repute. There is a great rugby rivalry between them and Treverton.
- Mooi River Primary in the centre of town.
- Ai Kajee Primary.
- Bruntville Primary serving the Bruntville area
- Emnyezaneni Secondary school serving the Bruntville area

== Economy ==
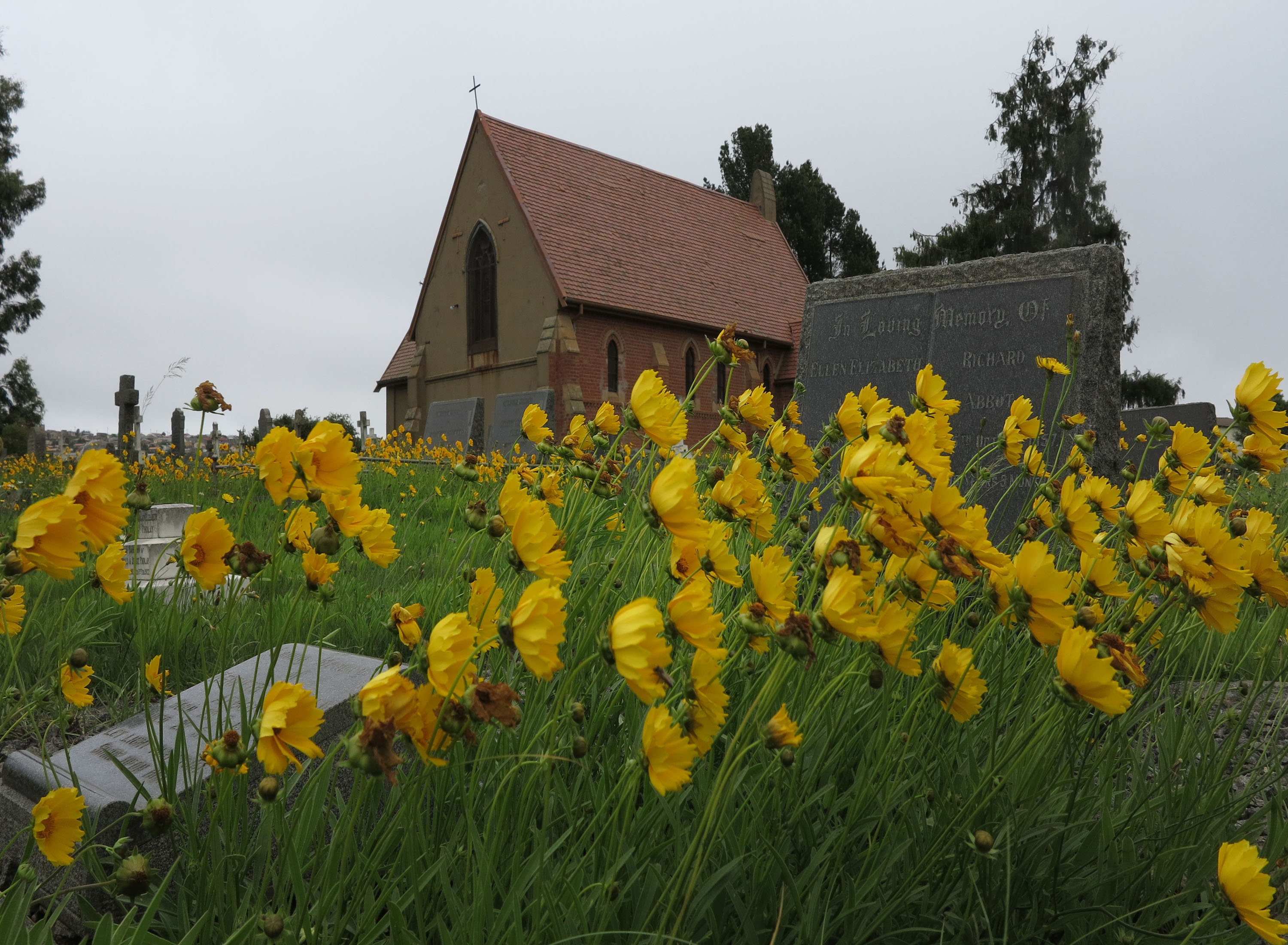
St John's Anglican Church at Weston, Mooi River, dates from 1872

The urban economy of the area is currently based primarily on retail entrepreneurship, tourism and supporting the local agricultural community. Previously, the backbone of the urban economy had been Mooi River Textiles which finally closed in 2002 after years of downsizing. The decline of the textile industry is being reversed however with large foreign investment from the Far East.

The rural economy is based on agriculture and tourism. The main farming categories are dairy and equine. Local farmers are supported by the Mooi River Farmers' Association.

== Tourism ==
Mooi River forms an important part of the Midlands Meander tourism route.

== Notable people ==
- Candice Swanepoel – supermodel best known for her work with Victoria's Secret. In 2012, she came in 10th on the Forbes top-earning models list.
- Sun-El Musician – South African DJ
- Kwazi Mshengu – KwaZulu-Natal MEC for Education, member of the KwaZulu-Natal Legislature: 2019-present
- Chris Pappas – member of the KwaZulu-Natal Legislature: 2019-present
- Lars Georg Svensson – cardiac surgeon, chairman of the heart and vascular institute at Cleveland Clinic, US.
