= Inkosi Langalibalele Local Municipality elections =

Local elections in KwaZulu-Natal, South Africa

The Inkosi Langalibalele Local Municipality council consists of forty-seven members elected by mixed-member proportional representation. Twenty-four councillors were elected by first-past-the-post voting in twenty-four wards, while the remaining twenty-three were chosen from party lists so that the total number of party representatives was proportional to the number of votes received

It was established for the 2016 South African municipal elections by the merging of Imbabazane and uMtshezi local municipalities.

In the election of 4 November 2026, the Inkatha Freedom Party (IFP) won a plurality of nineteen seats on the council.

== Results ==
The following table shows the composition of the council after past elections.

Event	ANC	ALJ	DA	EFF	IFP	NFP	MKP	Other	Total
2016 election	23	2	2	1	18	—	—	0	46
2021 election	17	0	3	2	21	3	—	1	47
2026 election	7	—	4	1	19	1	13	2	47

== August 2016 election ==
The following table shows the results of the 2016 election.

Party	Ward			List			Total seats
Party	Votes	%	Seats	Votes	%	Seats	Total seats
African National Congress	30,479	49.01	12	31,079	49.94	11	23
Inkatha Freedom Party	24,720	39.75	11	24,709	39.70	7	18
Democratic Alliance	2,589	4.16	0	2,590	4.16	2	2
Al Jama-ah	2,174	3.50	0	2,069	3.32	2	2
Economic Freedom Fighters	992	1.60	0	1,026	1.65	1	1
People's Revolutionary Movement	344	0.55	0	439	0.71	0	0
Independent candidates	758	1.22	0				0
Pan Africanist Congress of Azania	68	0.11	0	154	0.25	0	0
African Mantungwa Community	20	0.03	0	167	0.27	0	0
Congress of the People	43	0.07	0				0
Total	62,187	100.00	23	62,233	100.00	23	46
Valid votes	62,187	98.05		62,233	97.99		
Invalid/blank votes	1,236	1.95		1,275	2.01		
Total votes	63,423	100.00		63,508	100.00		
Registered voters/turnout	97,033	65.36		97,033	65.45		

== November 2021 election ==
The following table shows the results of the 2021 election.

Party	Ward			List			Total seats
Party	Votes	%	Seats	Votes	%	Seats	Total seats
Inkatha Freedom Party	23,102	43.13	14	24,209	45.13	7	21
African National Congress	18,490	34.52	8	19,303	35.99	9	17
National Freedom Party	3,094	5.78	0	3,013	5.62	3	3
Democratic Alliance	2,700	5.04	0	2,764	5.15	3	3
Economic Freedom Fighters	2,664	4.97	1	2,737	5.10	1	2
Independent candidates	2,036	3.80	1				1
African People's Movement	443	0.83	0	430	0.80	0	0
United Cultural Movement	372	0.69	0	322	0.60	0	0
Freedom Front Plus	230	0.43	0	210	0.39	0	0
African Mantungwa Community	82	0.15	0	200	0.37	0	0
Al Jama-ah	122	0.23	0	128	0.24	0	0
Abantu Batho Congress	99	0.18	0	69	0.13	0	0
Congress of the People	34	0.06	0	133	0.25	0	0
Black First Land First	84	0.16	0	51	0.10	0	0
African Transformation Movement	14	0.03	0	72	0.13	0	0
Total	53,566	100.00	24	53,641	100.00	23	47
Valid votes	53,566	98.35		53,641	98.23		
Invalid/blank votes	901	1.65		964	1.77		
Total votes	54,467	100.00		54,605	100.00		
Registered voters/turnout	98,630	55.22		98,630	55.36		

=== By-elections from November 2021 ===
The following by-elections were held to fill vacant ward seats in the period since the election in November 2021.

Date	Ward	Party of the previous councillor	Party of the newly elected councillor
28 Jun 2023	5	Inkatha Freedom Party	Inkatha Freedom Party
28 Jun 2023	14	Inkatha Freedom Party	African National Congress
28 Jun 2023	21	Inkatha Freedom Party	Inkatha Freedom Party
13 Dec 2023	11	Inkatha Freedom Party	Inkatha Freedom Party

== November 2026 election ==
The following table shows the results of the 2026 election.

Party	Ward			List			Total seats
Party	Votes	%	Seats	Votes	%	Seats	Total seats
Inkatha Freedom Party	25,750	40.28	16	26,423	41.36	3	19
uMkhonto weSizwe Party	17,057	26.68	4	18,135	28.39	9	13
African National Congress	10,042	15.71	0	9,908	15.51	7	7
Democratic Alliance	5,702	8.92	3	5,668	8.87	1	4
National Freedom Party	1,407	2.20	0	1,211	1.90	1	1
National Peoples Ambassadors	943	1.47	0	903	1.41	1	1
Independent candidates	1,300	2.03	1				1
Economic Freedom Fighters	460	0.72	0	492	0.77	1	1
African People's Movement	282	0.44	0	287	0.45	0	0
Abantu Bezwelethu Congress Democracy	228	0.36	0	117	0.18	0	0
Minority Front	165	0.26	0	123	0.19	0	0
United Cultural Movement	89	0.14	0	152	0.24	0	0
South African Communist Party	102	0.16	0	137	0.21	0	0
African Transformation Movement	97	0.15	0	131	0.21	0	0
Afrika Mayibuye Movement	86	0.13	0	116	0.18	0	0
African Mantungwa Community	85	0.13	0	58	0.09	0	0
African Renaissance Unity	103	0.16	0				0
Bumbana Mzansi	35	0.05	0	23	0.04	0	0
Total	63,933	100.00	24	63,884	100.00	23	47
Valid votes	63,933	98.88		63,884	98.82		
Invalid/blank votes	722	1.12		761	1.18		
Total votes	64,655	100.00		64,645	100.00		
Registered voters/turnout	110,203	58.67		110,203	58.66		
