= Bergville =

- Location within KwaZulu-Natal Location within South Africa
- Coordinates: 28°44′S 29°22′E
- Country: South Africa
- Province: KwaZulu-Natal
- District: uThukela
- Municipality: Okhahlamba

Area
  - Total: 2.74 km^{2} (1.06 sq mi)

Population (2026)
  - Total: 11,849
  - Density: 4,320/km^{2} (11,200/sq mi)

Racial makeup (2011)
  - Black African: 60.4%
  - Indian/Asian: 14.6%
  - White: 20.0%
  - Other: 3.8%

First languages (2011)
  - Zulu: 83.1%
  - English: 10.1%
  - Afrikaans: 1.1%
  - Sign language: 2.3%
  - Other: 2.1%
- Time zone: UTC+2 (SAST)
- Postal code (street): 3350
- PO box: 3350
- Area code: 036

Bergville (formerly known as Ntenjwa) is a town with a rich history.

The area was formerly known as Ntenjwa (eMangwaneni). The land was taken by the Hlongwane clan from the Hlubi clan after a conflict in the mid-19th century, believed to be around the 1850s. The conflict led to the displacement of the Hlubi clan. Despite being a chiefdom, the Hlongwane chief retains authority over the area, while acknowledging the supreme kingship of the Zulu monarch.

Bergville is equidistant from Johannesburg and Durban and is also known as the gateway to the Northern Drakensberg holiday resorts. It lies on Route R74, which is a more scenic alternative to the N3 Toll Road. This route takes one via the Oliviershoek Pass, traditionally used to access the Drakensberg, from Johannesburg. Bergville is most easily reached from Durban by turning off the N3 after Estcourt, joining the R74 through Winterton towards the mountain.

Bergville is composed mostly of three land areas: the town markert and it's near villages; Amangwane, Amazizi, Acton Homes, Thintwa Village, Rookdale, Bethany, Geluksburg, Woodford and the CBD. Amazizi includes Emazizini and Obonjaneni. Whiles Amangwane are the biggest areas with names such as Emaswazini, Ngoba, Dukuza, Zwelisha, Emoyeni, Emakhosaneni, Ndunwane, Stulwane, Khokhwane, and Magagangangozi.

Other towns in the immediate region include

- Ladysmith on the R616
- Acton Homes on the R616 towards Ladysmith
- Geluksburg
- Thintwa Village
- Jagersrust on the R74 towards Harrismith - living quarters for workers of the Drakensberg Pumped Storage Scheme

== Services ==
- Emmaus Hospital

== Projects in the Bergville Area ==
- World Vision
- Disability Information Project
- Bergville Community Builders

== Photo gallery ==
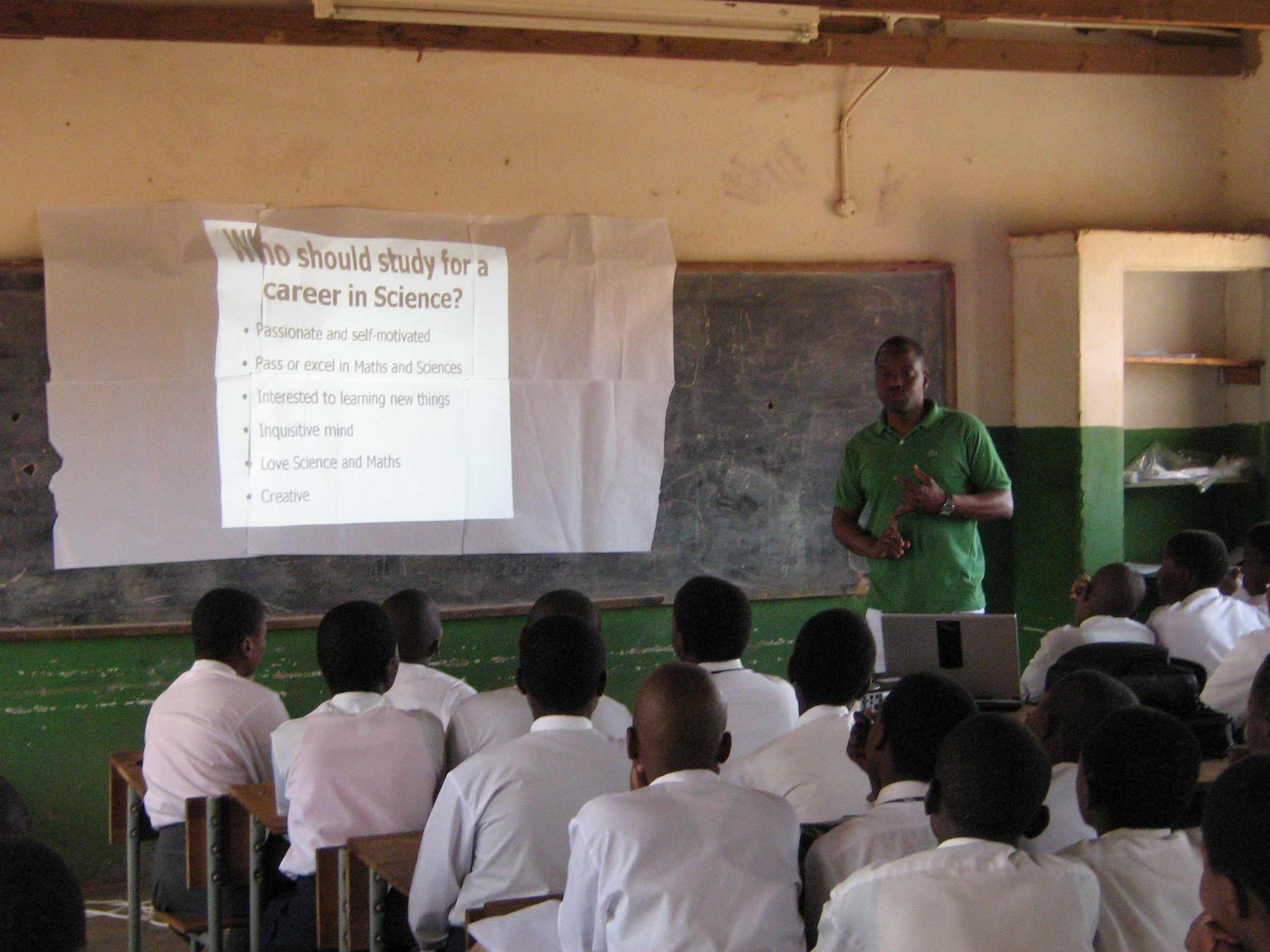
Bergville Community Builders Career Day at Ukhahlamba 2008

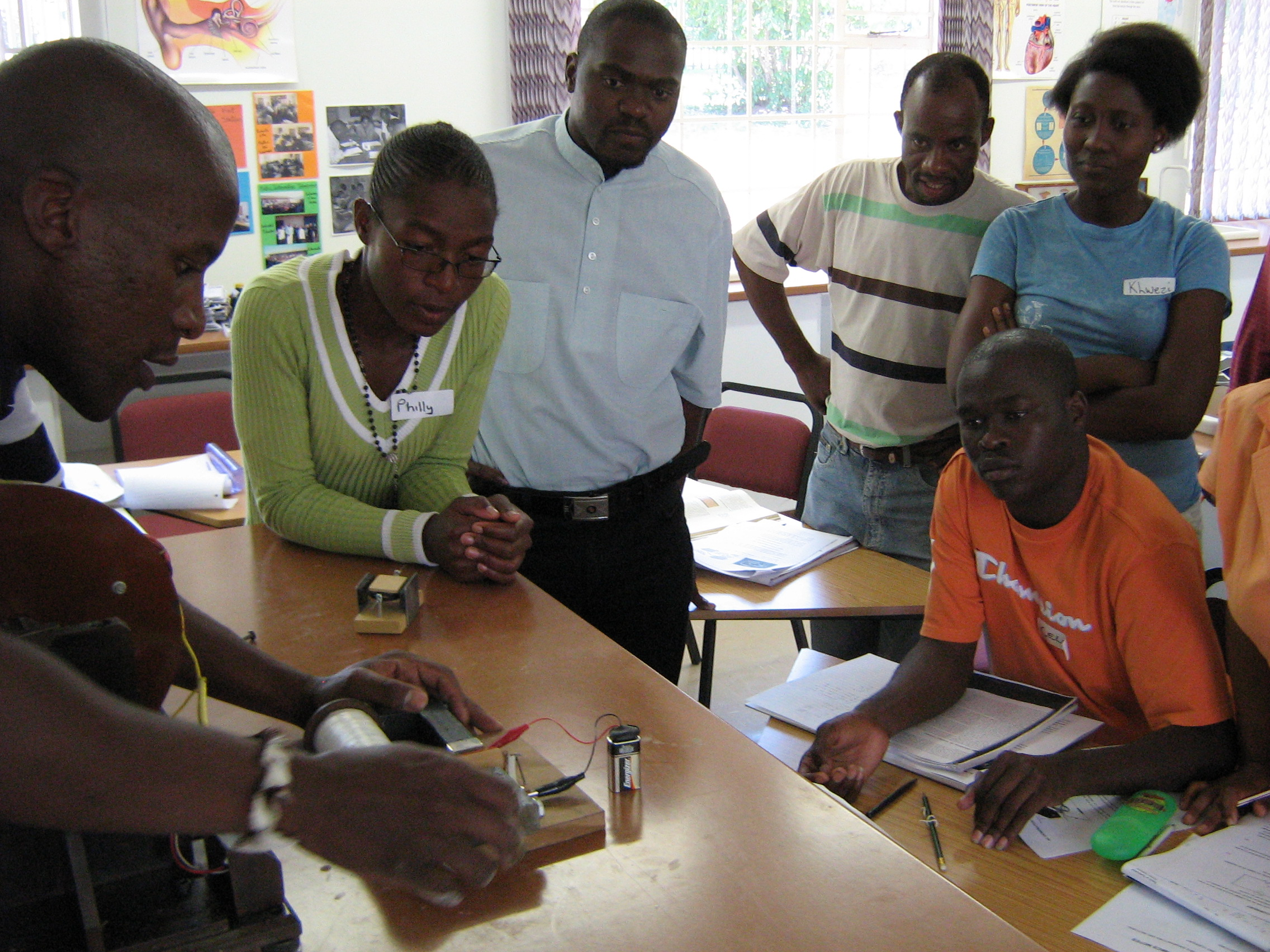
SAIEE and Wits students ran workshops for Bergville science teachers 2008

== Notable people ==
- Sjava (Jabulani Hadebe), singer, born 1983
- Big Zulu (Siyabonga Nene), rapper, born 1987
- Mhlahleni James "14" Shabalala, musician, died 2017
