= Alfred Duma Local Municipality elections =

Local elections in KwaZulu-Natal, South Africa

The Alfred Duma Local Municipality council consists of seventy-three members elected by mixed-member proportional representation. Thirty-seven councillors are elected by first-past-the-post voting in thirty-seven wards, while the remaining thirty-six are chosen from party lists so that the total number of party representatives is proportional to the number of votes received.

It was established for the August 2016 local elections by the merging of Emnambithi/Ladysmith and Indaka local municipalities.

In the election of 3 August 2016 the African National Congress (ANC) won a majority of forty-six seats on the council, while in 2021, the Inkatha Freedom Party won a plurality of thirty-three seats.

In 2026, the Inkatha Freedom Party dropped to twenty-four seats, but remained the largest party.

== Results ==
The following table shows the composition of the council after past elections.

Event	ANC	DA	EFF	IFP	NPA	MKP	Other	Total
2016 election	46	4	4	16	1	—	1	73
2021 election	28	3	5	33	1	—	3	73
2026 election	16	5	1	24	0	22	5	73

== August 2016 election ==
The following table shows the results of the 2016 election.

Party	Ward			List			Total seats
Party	Votes	%	Seats	Votes	%	Seats	Total seats
African National Congress	62,836	63.09	32	64,422	64.12	14	46
Inkatha Freedom Party	21,750	21.84	3	21,824	21.72	13	16
Democratic Alliance	5,887	5.91	1	6,134	6.11	3	4
Economic Freedom Fighters	5,145	5.17	0	5,148	5.12	4	4
National Democratic Convention	976	0.98	0	1,061	1.06	1	1
National Peoples Ambassadors	969	0.97	0	721	0.72	1	1
Independent candidates	1,012	1.02	0				0
African Mantungwa Community	328	0.33	0	496	0.49	0	0
Freedom Front Plus	316	0.32	0	253	0.25	0	0
African Christian Democratic Party	238	0.24	0	256	0.25	0	0
Pan Africanist Congress of Azania	7	0.01	0	151	0.15	0	0
Congress of the People	136	0.14	0				0
Total	99,600	100.00	36	100,466	100.00	36	72
Valid votes	99,600	98.62		100,466	98.26		
Invalid/blank votes	1,396	1.38		1,776	1.74		
Total votes	100,996	100.00		102,242	100.00		
Registered voters/turnout	164,357	61.45		164,357	62.21		

== November 2021 election ==
The following table shows the results of the 2021 election.

Party	Ward			List			Total seats
Party	Votes	%	Seats	Votes	%	Seats	Total seats
Inkatha Freedom Party	37,723	44.19	21	39,114	45.73	12	33
African National Congress	32,394	37.95	14	32,278	37.74	14	28
Economic Freedom Fighters	5,082	5.95	0	5,185	6.06	5	5
Democratic Alliance	3,382	3.96	2	3,615	4.23	1	3
National Freedom Party	1,423	1.67	0	1,414	1.65	1	1
National Peoples Ambassadors	735	0.86	0	915	1.07	1	1
African People's Movement	853	1.00	0	659	0.77	1	1
Independent candidates	1,454	1.70	0				0
Abantu Batho Congress	700	0.82	0	605	0.71	1	1
Justice and Employment Party	288	0.34	0	407	0.48	0	0
Freedom Front Plus	354	0.41	0	251	0.29	0	0
United Cultural Movement	226	0.26	0	229	0.27	0	0
African Christian Democratic Party	188	0.22	0	190	0.22	0	0
African Transformation Movement	143	0.17	0	206	0.24	0	0
National Democratic Convention	168	0.20	0	140	0.16	0	0
African Mantungwa Community	137	0.16	0	122	0.14	0	0
African People's Convention	92	0.11	0	108	0.13	0	0
Congress of the People	25	0.03	0	95	0.11	0	0
Total	85,367	100.00	37	85,533	100.00	36	73
Valid votes	85,367	98.67		85,533	98.51		
Invalid/blank votes	1,154	1.33		1,297	1.49		
Total votes	86,521	100.00		86,830	100.00		
Registered voters/turnout	161,688	53.51		161,688	53.70		

=== By-elections from November 2021 ===
The following by-elections were held to fill vacant ward seats in the period since the election in November 2021.

Date	Ward	Party of the previous councillor	Party of the newly elected councillor
28 Jun 2023	29	Inkatha Freedom Party	Inkatha Freedom Party

== November 2026 election ==
The following table shows the results of the 2026 election.

Party	Ward			List			Total seats
Party	Votes	%	Seats	Votes	%	Seats	Total seats
Inkatha Freedom Party	32,000	32.53	13	31,620	32.16	11	24
uMkhonto weSizwe Party	28,513	28.98	17	29,809	30.32	5	22
African National Congress	21,588	21.94	3	21,054	21.42	13	16
Democratic Alliance	6,032	6.13	3	6,374	6.48	2	5
Abantu Bezwelethu Congress Democracy	4,219	4.29	1	4,110	4.18	2	3
Economic Freedom Fighters	1,635	1.66	0	1,594	1.62	1	1
South African Communist Party	801	0.81	0	761	0.77	1	1
Afrika Mayibuye Movement	500	0.51	0	438	0.45	1	1
African Renaissance Unity	353	0.36	0	349	0.36	0	0
African People's Movement	357	0.36	0	344	0.35	0	0
African Transformation Movement	306	0.31	0	390	0.40	0	0
Independent candidates	657	0.67	0				0
National Freedom Party	286	0.29	0	346	0.35	0	0
African Independent Congress	334	0.34	0	271	0.28	0	0
African Christian Democratic Party	136	0.14	0	219	0.22	0	0
United Cultural Movement	138	0.14	0	150	0.15	0	0
National Peoples Ambassadors	109	0.11	0	129	0.13	0	0
African Mantungwa Community	130	0.13	0	67	0.07	0	0
National Democratic Convention	91	0.09	0	104	0.11	0	0
Patriotic Alliance	87	0.09	0	88	0.09	0	0
African Movement Congress	49	0.05	0	63	0.06	0	0
Bumbana Mzansi	58	0.06	0	28	0.03	0	0
Total	98,379	100.00	37	98,308	100.00	36	73
Valid votes	98,379	98.53		98,308	98.54		
Invalid/blank votes	1,472	1.47		1,458	1.46		
Total votes	99,851	100.00		99,766	100.00		
Registered voters/turnout	181,335	55.06		181,335	55.02		
