= Geluksburg =

- Location within KwaZulu-Natal Location within South Africa
- Coordinates: 28°31′S 29°21′E
- Country: South Africa
- Province: KwaZulu-Natal
- District: Uthukela (IFP)
- Municipality: Okhahlamba (APEMO)
- Ward: Ward 13
- Ward Councillor: John van Rooijan (IFP)

Area
  - Total: 1.21 km^{2} (0.47 sq mi)

Population (2022)
  - Total: 211
  - Density: 174/km^{2} (452/sq mi)

Racial makeup (2022)
  - Black African: 41%
  - Coloured: 0.6%
  - White: 55.4%

First languages (2022)
  - Zulu: 38%
  - Afrikaans: 32.9%
  - English: 38.9%
  - Sotho: 0.9%
  - Other: 0.6%
- Time zone: UTC+2 (SAST)
- PO box: 3377

Geluksburg is a small village in the Northern of Drakensberg in the KwaZulu Natal province in South Africa, located approximately 24 km from Bergville, close to Green Point and to the Free State border between the Oliviershoek and Van Reenen Mountain passes. The village lies 6 km below the base of the Tintwa mountains.

These ridges provide views of the Northern Drakensberg. Furthermore, these foothills contain notable examples of San Rock Art. These are not yet open to the public due to archaeological survey work. The word “Geluk” means ‘luck’ in Afrikaans and ‘Burg’ a town or residential area.

The closest other towns include Bergville, Ladysmith and Harrismith. The village is accessible only by gravel roads. Its residents include retirees, teachers, social workers and people who work remotely.

== History ==
Geluksburg played a role in the history of the Bushmen (San), Zulu, Boer and British. Firstly, inhabited by the Bushman. However, they were forced out of the region by Nguni clans and the early European settlers. King Shaka’s Mfecane during the early 1800s added to their displacement from this area.

The ‘Lost Valley’ located near Geluksburg was an early settlement of ‘Trek Boers’. This group were a “White Tribe” that lived an elementary life. Some five families lost their way from Piet Retief’s primary group, and as a result sought refuge in this valley. They were very reclusive until being discovered by a journalist in the 1950’s. The journalist observed them living in very simple mud dwellings.

The “Lost Valley” is now private farmland. However, tours can be arranged to see the remnants of the homes of this community.

== Schools ==
- Maswazi Primary,
- Rheibokspruit Loërskool,
- Thintwa Secondary,
- Ekukhuleni Early Childhood Development,
- Geluksburg Daycare,
- Rooihoek Loërskool,
- Ngcongcosi Secondary,
- Vukuzithathe Primary,
