= Kliprivier =

Kliprivier may refer to:

- Kliprivier, Uthukela, a town in KwaZulu-Natal, South Africa
- Klip River (Gauteng), a river tributary of the Vaal in South Africa
- Klip River (KwaZulu-Natal), a tributary of the Tugela in South Africa
- Klip River (Eastern Cape), a tributary of the Swartkops River in South Africa
- Klip River (Western Cape), a tributary of the Breede River in South Africa
