= Goodhome =

- Location within KwaZulu-Natal Location within South Africa
- Coordinates: 29.080°S 29.668°E
- Country: South Africa
- Province: KwaZulu-Natal
- District: uThukela
- Municipality: Inkosi Langalibalele

Area
  - Total: 2.60 km^{2} (1.00 sq mi)

Population (2011)
  - Total: 5,133
  - Density: 1,970/km^{2} (5,110/sq mi)

Racial makeup (2011)
  - Black African: 99.5%
  - Coloured: 0.2%
  - Other: 0.3%

First languages (2011)
  - Zulu: 95.1%
  - S. Ndebele: 1.3%
  - English: 1.0%
  - Other: 2.6%
- Time zone: UTC+2 (SAST)
- PO box: 3310

Goodhome is a town in Uthukela District Municipality in the KwaZulu-Natal province of South Africa.
