= Okhahlamba Local Municipality =

Okhahlamba
- Local municipality
- Seal

- Location in KwaZulu-Natal
- Coordinates: 28°44′S 29°22′E
- Country: South Africa
- Province: KwaZulu-Natal
- District: uThukela
- Seat: Bergville
- Wards: 14

Government
  - Type: Municipal council
  - Mayor: Vikizitha Mlotshwa APEMO

Area
  - Total: 3,971 km^{2} (1,533 sq mi)

Population (2011)
  - Total: 132,068
  - Density: 33.26/km^{2} (86.14/sq mi)

Racial makeup (2011)
  - Black African: 97.1%
  - Coloured: 0.2%
  - Indian/Asian: 0.4%
  - White: 2.1%

First languages (2011)
  - Zulu: 93.2%
  - English: 2.0%
  - Southern Ndebele: 1.2%
  - Afrikaans: 1.0%
  - Other: 2.6%
- Time zone: UTC+2 (SAST)
- Municipal code: KZN235

Okhahlamba Municipality (Zulu: UMasipala woKhahlamba) is a local municipality within the uThukela District Municipality, in the KwaZulu-Natal province of South Africa.

== Society and culture ==
=== Museums, monuments and memorials ===
==== Spion Kop ====
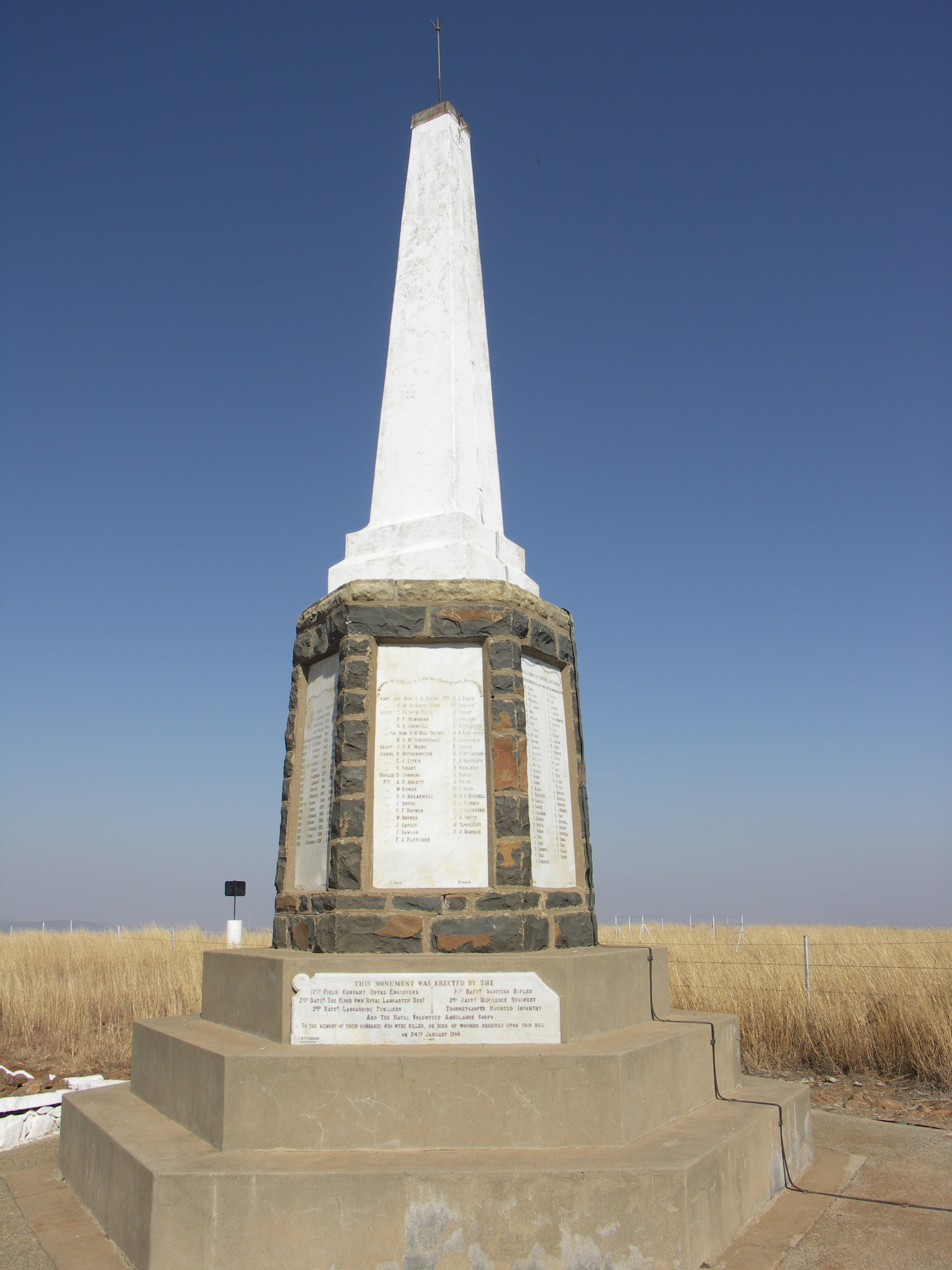
British memorial at Spion Kop

This large battlefield located some 30 km outside Ladysmith contains the mass graves of British soldiers, individual graves as well as a number of memorials, including a Boer memorial, British memorial, South Lancashire memorial and Imperial Light Infantry memorial.

=== Nature reserves ===
==== Spioenkop Nature Reserve ====
25 kilometres (16 mi) from Ladysmith is one of South Africa’s popular wildlife sanctuaries, Spioenkop Nature Reserve. This 60 square kilometres (23 sq mi) reserve is home to animals such as the rhino, giraffe and zebra. The sporting activities that Spioenkop offers include hiking, horse riding, angling, yachting, water-skiing and power boating. Spioenkop is also supplies other parts of Gauteng with water because in Gauteng there is a shortage of water.

== Main places ==
The 2001 census divided the municipality into the following main places:

Place	Code	Area (km^{2})	Population
Amangwane	51701	737.10	67,829
Amazizi	51702	95.71	16,010
Bergville Part 1	51703	80.11	27,670
Bergville Part 2	51715	2.53	702
Drakensberg	51704	0.40	75
Driefontein, KwaZulu-Natal	51705	1.41	231
Estcourt	51706	4.79	988
Geluksburg	51707	1.08	209
Jagersrust	51708	0.63	199
Northern Natal Drakensberg	51709	142.17	3
Rugged Glen Nature Reserve	51711	7.66	15
Spioenkop Dam Nature Reserve	51712	41.63	48
Van Reenen	51713	0.48	78
Winterton	51714	1.81	2,186
Remainder of the municipality	51710	2,365.82	21,277

== Politics ==
The municipal council consists of twenty-nine members elected by mixed-member proportional representation. Fifteen councillors are elected by first-past-the-post voting in fifteen wards, while the remaining fourteen are chosen from party lists so that the total number of party representatives is proportional to the number of votes received.

In the election of 4 November 2026 no party won a majority on the council. The Inkatha Freedom Party (IFP) and uMkhonto weSizwe Party both obtained eight seats.

The following table shows the results of the election.

Party	Ward			List			Total seats
Party	Votes	%	Seats	Votes	%	Seats	Total seats
Inkatha Freedom Party	9,900	26.35	6	9,867	26.22	2	8
uMkhonto weSizwe Party	9,369	24.94	6	9,752	25.91	2	8
African National Congress	6,681	17.78	2	6,589	17.51	3	5
National Peoples Ambassadors	2,921	7.77	1	2,807	7.46	1	2
Democratic Alliance	2,469	6.57	0	2,550	6.78	2	2
African People's Movement	2,346	6.24	0	2,263	6.01	2	2
Freedom Front Plus	1,560	4.15	0	1,586	4.21	1	1
Economic Freedom Fighters	458	1.22	0	469	1.25	1	1
Independent candidates	61	0.16	0				0
13 other parties	1,807	4.81	0	1,753	4.66	0	0
Total	37,572	100.00	15	37,636	100.00	14	29
Valid votes	37,572	98.11		37,636	98.38		
Invalid/blank votes	723	1.89		621	1.62		
Total votes	38,295	100.00		38,257	100.00		
Registered voters/turnout	68,749	55.70		68,749	55.65		
