= Driefontein (disambiguation) =

Driefontein may refer to:

- Driefontein Farm
- Driefontein, Gauteng
- Driefontein, KwaZulu-Natal
- Driefontein, North West
- Driefontein mine
