= Waayhoek =

- Location within KwaZulu-Natal Location within South Africa
- Coordinates: 28.514°S 30.085°E
- Country: South Africa
- Province: KwaZulu-Natal
- District: uThukela
- Municipality: Alfred Duma

Area
  - Total: 1.85 km^{2} (0.71 sq mi)

Population (2011)
  - Total: 1,623
  - Density: 877/km^{2} (2,270/sq mi)

Racial makeup (2011)
  - Black African: 99.8%
  - Indian/Asian: 0.1%
  - White: 0.1%
  - Other: 0.1%

First languages (2011)
  - Zulu: 93.8%
  - S. Ndebele: 2.7%
  - English: 1.2%
  - Afrikaans: 1.1%
  - Other: 1.2%
- Time zone: UTC+2 (SAST)

Waayhoek is a town in Uthukela District Municipality in the KwaZulu-Natal province of South Africa.
