= UMhlabuyalingana Local Municipality =

uMhlabuyalingana
- Local municipality
- Seal

- Location of UMhlabuyalingana Local Municipality within KwaZulu-Natal
- Coordinates: 27°1′S 32°44′E
- Country: South Africa
- Province: KwaZulu-Natal
- District: uMkhanyakude
- Seat: Kwangwanase
- Wards: 20

Government
  - Type: Municipal council

Area
  - Total: 3,964 km^{2} (1,531 sq mi)

Population (2011)
  - Total: 156,736
  - Density: 39.54/km^{2} (102.4/sq mi)

Racial makeup (2011)
  - Black African: 99.3%
  - Coloured: 0.1%
  - Indian/Asian: 0.1%
  - White: 0.3%

First languages (2011)
  - Zulu: 95.7%
  - English: 1.2%
  - Southern Ndebele: 1.0%
  - Other: 2.1%
- Time zone: UTC+2 (SAST)
- Municipal code: KZN271

uMhlabuyalingana Municipality (Zulu: UMasipala wakwa Mhlabuyalingana) is a local municipality within the uMkhanyakude District Municipality, in the northeastern part of the KwaZulu-Natal province of South Africa. The municipality is one of the poorest in the country. It encompasses a World Heritage Site and several areas under environmental protection. Areas of conservation and environmental interest within or adjacent to the uMhlabuyalingana area include the Tembe Elephant Park, iSimangaliso Wetland Park (a World Heritage Site), the Suni-Ridge Sand Forest Park, and the Phongolo Nature Reserve.

The municipality was approximately 98% rural in 2001, with a population of 140,963 inhabitants according to Statistics South Africa. The municipality is made up of at least 99% Black South Africans, most of whom are isiZulu-speaking. The population is very young: 44% were younger than 15, and 77% were younger than 35 years old. Because of its youth, the population is particularly vulnerable to the impact of HIV/AIDS. Towns and major settlement nodes in the area include Emanguzi, Mbazwana, Kwangwanase, Maputa, Mboza, Mseleni and Skhemelele.

== Missing funds ==
On 8 April 2009, the Inkatha Freedom Party (IFP), which controls the municipality, summoned its entire caucus to a meeting aimed at determining the veracity of reports alleging more than R3,000,000 (US$403,390) in funds unaccounted for. Professor Themba Msimang, chairman of the party's Policy Oversight Committee (POC), and also current chair of South Africa's Heraldry Council, called for uMhlabuyalingana to accept a forensic audit. According to an IFP press release, Msimang stated that the party was "highly agitated" by the reports, "not simply because of the implication of corruption but also because it transgressed everything the party stands for... We will have to await the process that entails the municipality's council calling for such a forensic audit. I can assure you, though, our party will get to the bottom of this, and, if heads have to roll, so be it: they will."

== Main places ==
The 2001 census divided the municipality into the following main places:

Place	Code	Area (km^{2})	Population
Mabaso	53201	543.41	19,398
Manukuza/Jobe	53202	20.79	314
Mashabane	53203	708.01	26,620
Ndumu Game Reserve	53204	13.69	6
Tembe Elephant Reserve	53206	275.27	36
Tembe	53205	1,909.15	79,111
Zikhali/Mbila	53207	202.24	15,489

== Politics ==
The municipal council consists of thirty-nine members elected by mixed-member proportional representation. Twenty councillors are elected by first-past-the-post voting in twenty wards, while the remaining nineteen are chosen from party lists so that the total number of party representatives is proportional to the number of votes received.

In the election of 4 November 2026 the uMkhonto weSizwe Party won the most votes, but no party gained a majority.

Party	Ward			List			Total seats
Party	Votes	%	Seats	Votes	%	Seats	Total seats
uMkhonto weSizwe Party	21,934	34.94	10	22,042	35.13	4	14
African National Congress	18,159	28.93	4	17,698	28.21	7	11
Inkatha Freedom Party	16,362	26.06	6	16,539	26.36	4	10
Service Delivery Party	1,038	1.65	0	1,036	1.65	1	1
Economic Freedom Fighters	946	1.51	0	933	1.49	1	1
African Christian Democratic Party	777	1.24	0	765	1.22	1	1
Democratic Alliance	682	1.09	0	718	1.14	1	1
15 other parties	2,877	4.58	0	3,015	4.81	0	0
Total	62,775	100.00	20	62,746	100.00	19	39
Valid votes	62,775	98.24		62,746	98.23		
Invalid/blank votes	1,124	1.76		1,128	1.77		
Total votes	63,899	100.00		63,874	100.00		
Registered voters/turnout	103,517	61.73		103,517	61.70		
