= UMhlabuyalingana Local Municipality elections =

Local elections in KwaZulu-Natal, South Africa

The uMhlabuyalingana Local Municipality council consists of thirty-nine members elected by mixed-member proportional representation. Twenty councillors are elected by first-past-the-post voting in twenty wards, while the remaining nineteen are chosen from party lists so that the total number of party representatives is proportional to the number of votes received.

In the election of 4 November 2026 the uMkhonto weSizwe Party won the most votes, but no party gained a majority.

== Results ==
The following table shows the composition of the council after past elections.

Event	ACDP	ANC	DA	EFF	IFP	NFP	MKP	Other	Total
2000 election	—	5	—	—	19	—	—	0	24
2006 election	—	12	—	—	14	—	—	0	26
2011 election	0	22	0	—	8	4	—	0	34
2016 election	—	22	1	1	10	—	—	1	35
2021 election	1	18	1	2	15	1	—	1	39
2026 election	1	11	1	1	10	0	14	1	39

== December 2000 election ==
The following table shows the results of the 2000 election.

Party	Ward			List			Total seats
Party	Votes	%	Seats	Votes	%	Seats	Total seats
Inkatha Freedom Party	16,983	80.26	12	17,008	80.39	7	19
African National Congress	4,070	19.24	0	4,149	19.61	5	5
Independent candidates	106	0.50	0				0
Total	21,159	100.00	12	21,157	100.00	12	24
Valid votes	21,159	96.81		21,157	96.74		
Invalid/blank votes	697	3.19		713	3.26		
Total votes	21,856	100.00		21,870	100.00		
Registered voters/turnout	41,401	52.79		41,401	52.82		

== March 2006 election ==
The following table shows the results of the 2006 election.

Party	Ward			List			Total seats
Party	Votes	%	Seats	Votes	%	Seats	Total seats
Inkatha Freedom Party	16,250	54.25	8	15,948	53.21	6	14
African National Congress	13,629	45.50	5	13,582	45.32	7	12
National Democratic Convention	74	0.25	0	440	1.47	0	0
Total	29,953	100.00	13	29,970	100.00	13	26
Valid votes	29,953	96.80		29,970	97.04		
Invalid/blank votes	989	3.20		915	2.96		
Total votes	30,942	100.00		30,885	100.00		
Registered voters/turnout	53,047	58.33		53,047	58.22		

== May 2011 election ==
The following table shows the results of the 2011 election.

Party	Ward			List			Total seats
Party	Votes	%	Seats	Votes	%	Seats	Total seats
African National Congress	25,584	63.46	17	25,952	64.53	5	22
Inkatha Freedom Party	9,387	23.28	0	9,183	22.83	8	8
National Freedom Party	4,546	11.28	0	4,365	10.85	4	4
African Christian Democratic Party	366	0.91	0	162	0.40	0	0
Democratic Alliance	193	0.48	0	327	0.81	0	0
Federal Congress	125	0.31	0	145	0.36	0	0
South African Democratic Congress	116	0.29	0	84	0.21	0	0
Total	40,317	100.00	17	40,218	100.00	17	34
Valid votes	40,317	98.14		40,218	98.13		
Invalid/blank votes	763	1.86		767	1.87		
Total votes	41,080	100.00		40,985	100.00		
Registered voters/turnout	65,406	62.81		65,406	62.66		

== August 2016 election ==
The following table shows the results of the 2016 election.

Party	Ward			List			Total seats
Party	Votes	%	Seats	Votes	%	Seats	Total seats
African National Congress	27,912	56.58	17	28,836	60.05	5	22
Inkatha Freedom Party	13,304	26.97	1	13,897	28.94	9	10
Independent candidates	5,212	10.57	0				0
African Independent Congress	1,065	2.16	0	2,865	5.97	1	1
Democratic Alliance	933	1.89	0	1,278	2.66	1	1
Economic Freedom Fighters	905	1.83	0	1,140	2.37	1	1
Zulu Royal Property	0	0.00	0				0
Total	49,331	100.00	18	48,016	100.00	17	35
Valid votes	49,331	97.19		48,016	95.52		
Invalid/blank votes	1,428	2.81		2,251	4.48		
Total votes	50,759	100.00		50,267	100.00		
Registered voters/turnout	79,546	63.81		79,546	63.19		

=== August 2016 to November 2021 by-elections ===
Following a by election which took place in March 2019 the ANC won a ward previously held by the IFP, and the council was reconstituted as follows:

Party	Ward	PR list	Total
ANC	18	5	23
Inkatha Freedom Party	0	9	9
AIC	0	1	1
DA	0	1	1
Economic Freedom Fighters	0	1	1
Total	18	17	35

== November 2021 election ==
The following table shows the results of the 2021 election.

Party	Ward			List			Total seats
Party	Votes	%	Seats	Votes	%	Seats	Total seats
African National Congress	21,619	44.95	12	21,884	46.34	6	18
Inkatha Freedom Party	16,667	34.65	8	17,849	37.79	7	15
Economic Freedom Fighters	2,078	4.32	0	2,167	4.59	2	2
Independent candidates	2,950	6.13	0				0
Abahlali Base Mkhanyakude Movement	1,042	2.17	0	1,113	2.36	1	1
Democratic Alliance	888	1.85	0	951	2.01	1	1
National Freedom Party	724	1.51	0	728	1.54	1	1
African Christian Democratic Party	641	1.33	0	699	1.48	1	1
Abantu Batho Congress	590	1.23	0	616	1.30	0	0
African Independent Congress	535	1.11	0	654	1.38	0	0
Justice and Employment Party	121	0.25	0	208	0.44	0	0
Black First Land First	82	0.17	0	94	0.20	0	0
United Christian Democratic Party	73	0.15	0	53	0.11	0	0
African Transformation Movement	51	0.11	0	69	0.15	0	0
People's Freedom Party	20	0.04	0	72	0.15	0	0
African People's Movement	12	0.02	0	45	0.10	0	0
Umnotho Democratic Front	5	0.01	0	26	0.06	0	0
Zulu Royal Property	1	0.00	0				0
Total	48,099	100.00	20	47,228	100.00	19	39
Valid votes	48,099	97.54		47,228	97.06		
Invalid/blank votes	1,212	2.46		1,429	2.94		
Total votes	49,311	100.00		48,657	100.00		
Registered voters/turnout	85,431	57.72		85,431	56.95		

=== By-elections from November 2021 ===
The following by-elections were held to fill vacant ward seats in the period from the election in November 2021.

Date	Ward	Party of the previous councillor	Party of the newly elected councillor
26 Apr 2023	19	African National Congress	Inkatha Freedom Party
13 Feb 2025	15	African National Congress	Inkatha Freedom Party

Following the February 2025 by-election, the Inkatha Freedom Party became the largest party. The council composition is as follows:

Party	Ward seats	List seats	Total seats
Inkatha Freedom Party	10	7	17
African National Congress	10	6	16
Economic Freedom Fighters	0	2	2
Abahlali Base Mkhanyakude Movement	0	1	1
Democratic Alliance	0	1	1
National Freedom Party	0	1	1
African Christian Democratic Party	0	1	1
Total	20	19	39

== November 2026 election ==
The following table shows the results of the 2026 election.

Party	Ward			List			Total seats
Party	Votes	%	Seats	Votes	%	Seats	Total seats
uMkhonto weSizwe Party	21,934	34.94	10	22,042	35.13	4	14
African National Congress	18,159	28.93	4	17,698	28.21	7	11
Inkatha Freedom Party	16,362	26.06	6	16,539	26.36	4	10
Service Delivery Party	1,038	1.65	0	1,036	1.65	1	1
Economic Freedom Fighters	946	1.51	0	933	1.49	1	1
African Christian Democratic Party	777	1.24	0	765	1.22	1	1
Democratic Alliance	682	1.09	0	718	1.14	1	1
National Community Liberation	580	0.92	0	509	0.81	0	0
Jozini Congress	449	0.72	0	443	0.71	0	0
Mawusa Movement Party	368	0.59	0	368	0.59	0	0
South African Communist Party	350	0.56	0	360	0.57	0	0
Afrika Mayibuye Movement	212	0.34	0	199	0.32	0	0
African Economic Freedom	171	0.27	0	193	0.31	0	0
National Freedom Party	155	0.25	0	173	0.28	0	0
Abahlali Base Mkhanyakude Movement	98	0.16	0	187	0.30	0	0
People's Power Freedom Party	106	0.17	0	109	0.17	0	0
African Transformation Movement	76	0.12	0	123	0.20	0	0
Gods Justice and Development Party	103	0.16	0	91	0.15	0	0
Pan Africanist Congress of Azania	70	0.11	0	106	0.17	0	0
People's Freedom Party	71	0.11	0	77	0.12	0	0
United Christian Democratic Party	68	0.11	0	60	0.10	0	0
Sakhisizwe Convention				17	0.03	0	0
Total	62,775	100.00	20	62,746	100.00	19	39
Valid votes	62,775	98.24		62,746	98.23		
Invalid/blank votes	1,124	1.76		1,128	1.77		
Total votes	63,899	100.00		63,874	100.00		
Registered voters/turnout	103,517	61.73		103,517	61.70		
