= Windsor Dam =

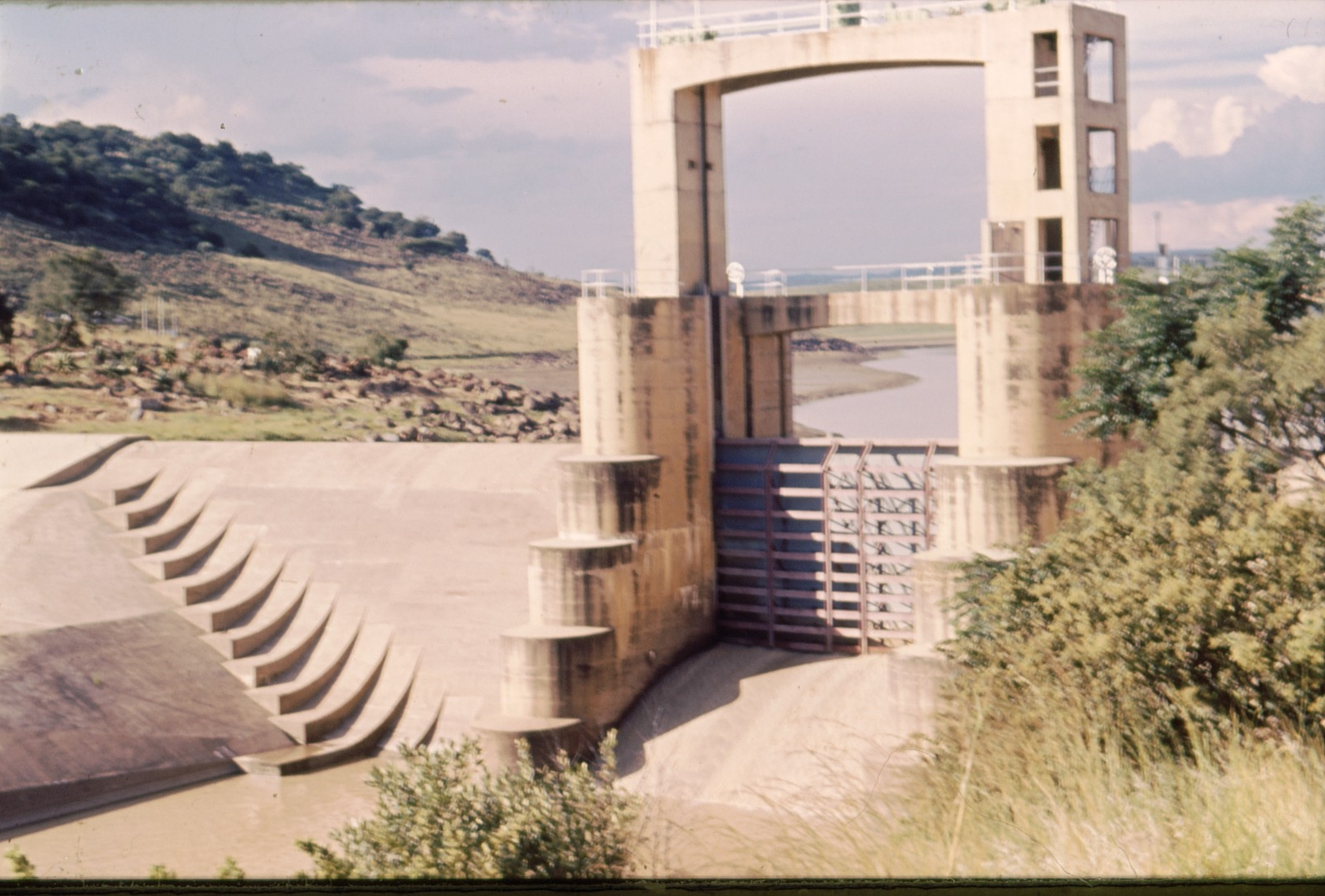
- Windsor Dam

- Location within South Africa
- Official name: Windsor Dam
- Location: Ladysmith, KwaZulu-Natal
- Coordinates: 28.502°S 29.738°E
- Opening date: 1949

Dam and spillways
- Impounds: Klip River

Windsor Dam was originally built to control flooding of Ladysmith, in KwaZulu-Natal by the Klip River, but silt buildup quickly reduced its efficiency. The Windsor Dam was commissioned in 1950, has a capacity of 772 cubic metres (27,300 cu ft), and a surface area of 0.826 square kilometres (0.319 sq mi), the dam wall is 17 metres (56 ft) high.

The Qedusizi Dam further downstream in the Klip River was completed in 1997 to take over the task of flood management.
