= Wembezi =

- Location within KwaZulu-Natal Location within South Africa
- Coordinates: 29.041°S 29.796°E
- Country: South Africa
- Province: KwaZulu-Natal
- District: Uthukela
- Municipality: Inkosi Langalibalele

Government
  - Councillor: Sam Dladla (ANC)

Area
  - Total: 18.29 km^{2} (7.06 sq mi)

Population (2024)
  - Total: 20,000 + (approx.)
  - Density: 1,100/km^{2} (2,800/sq mi)

Racial makeup (2024)
  - Black African: 99.9%
  - Coloured: 0.1%
  - Indian/Asian: 0%
  - White: 0.0%

First languages (2001)
  - Zulu: 98.5%
  - Other: 1.5%
- Time zone: UTC+2 (SAST)
- Postal code (street): 3310
- PO box: 3384

Wembezi is a township at Estcourt in the Uthukela District Municipality in the KwaZulu-Natal province of South Africa.

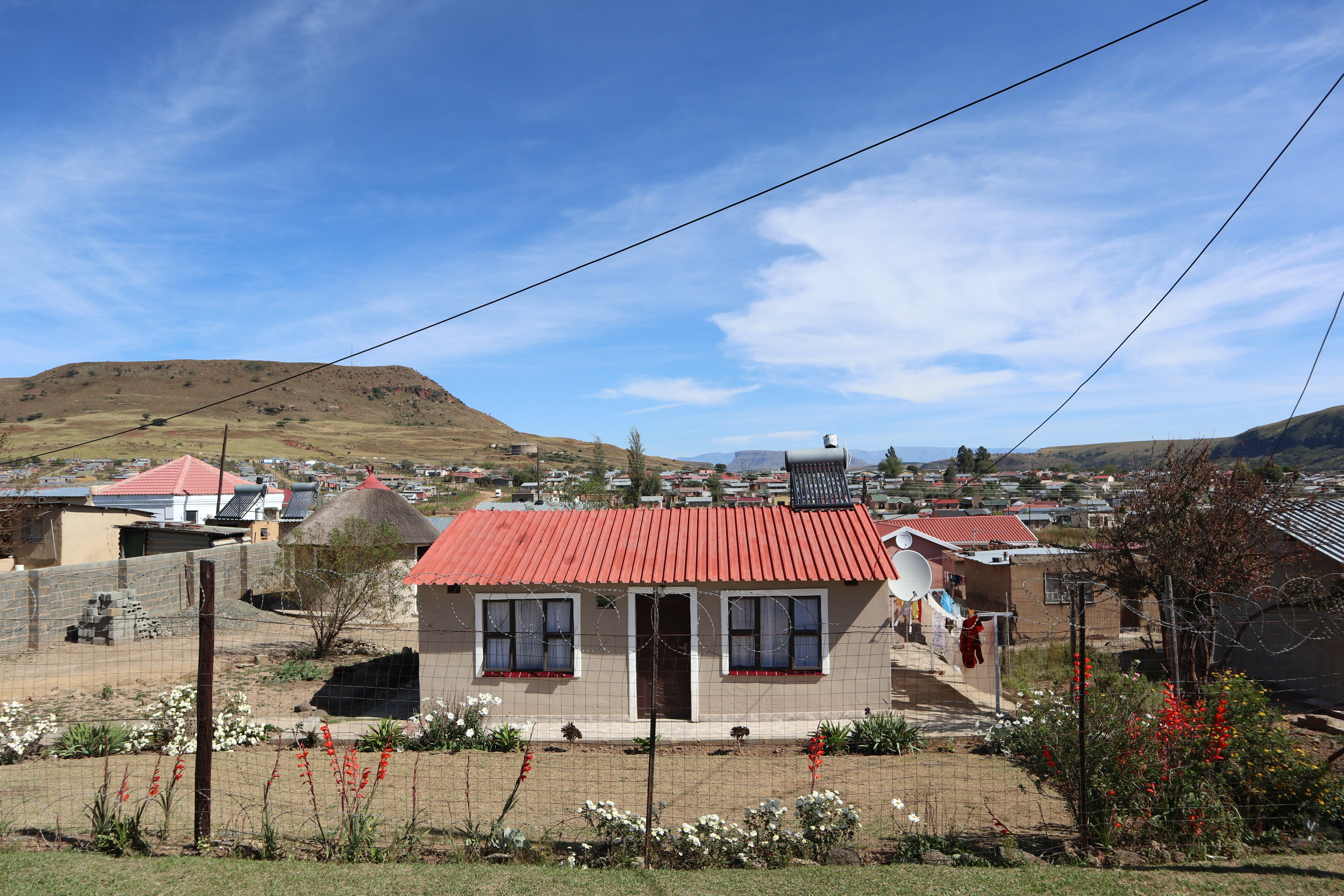
Wembezi homestead showing coexistence of traditional thatched indlu and modern brick house

Wembezi has a deeply significant political history, particularly shaped by the intense conflict between the African National Congress (ANC) and the Inkatha Freedom Party (IFP) during the period of political violence commonly referred to as udlame (the upheaval). This era was marked by devastating clashes that claimed many lives and left lasting trauma within the community. For many long-standing residents, these events remain painful memories that continue to shape collective identity and social relations. Historically, Wembezi was predominantly an IFP stronghold. This political landscape began to shift with the introduction and growth of ANC structures, initially centred in the Depo Section. From there, ANC support gradually expanded into other areas, notably the 5 Room (A Section) and VQ sections, leading to a more politically diverse township. In the present day, Wembezi reflects a multiparty political environment. While the ANC remains the ruling party, other political formations represented in the area include MKP, NFP, IFP, with smaller representation from the EFF and Al Jama-ah. Sections of Wembezi Wembezi comprises approximately 11 sections, each with its own distinct character, history, and social infrastructure: B Section (Long Homes): A more suburban-style area, home to Zola Primary School. The new cemetery is located nearby, and the Estcourt Educational Circuit Office is based in this section. Mahhashini: Historically notable as the home of Wembezi’s only surgeon, the late Dr Thulani. This section hosts the Wembezi Police Station, Wembezi Community Library, and the well-known Meester Lounge. Gunawugi: Known for its strong adherence to traditional values and customs, maintaining a distinctly old-fashioned cultural identity. JZ Section: Consists of RDP houses constructed during the presidency of Jacob Zuma, from which the section derives its name. The old cemetery, now closed due to space limitations, is situated above this area. VQ Section: Widely regarded as the most vibrant and active part of Wembezi. It is home to popular social venues such as Kwa Nana (also known as Ntokozo’s Tavern or Kwa Mdala eMakasini) and Kwa Thami. The section also includes Nkanyiso Primary School, the Wembezi Multi-Purpose Hall, and the Wembezi Clinic. Nkwezela: Once notorious for criminal gang activity, contributing to its reputation as a dangerous area in earlier years. Muntuza Full Service School is located here. C Section: Colloquially referred to as Kwa fela ubala (“where you die for no reason”), this area was historically associated with high levels of violence. Zamukuthula Primary School is situated in this section. D Section: A small settlement located beyond C Section, marking the outer edge of Wembezi. Depo Section: Named after the former bus depot, this section is historically significant as the birthplace of ANC structures in Wembezi. It was home to respected ANC veteran Baba uMkhize and hosts Wembezi High School, the oldest high school in the township. A Section (5 Room): The only section characterised by government-built five-room houses. It includes Wembezi Stadium and Emaromini, the oldest church in the township. Russia: A small two-street area located within the Depo Section. Bantwana: A small area situated between the VQ Section and Wembezi Stadium. EmaShona: A semi-rural settlement experiencing rapid growth due to the availability of land for housing development.
