= Indaka Local Municipality =

Coordinates: 28°18′S 30°06′E

Indaka
- Local municipality
- Seal

- Location in KwaZulu-Natal
- Country: South Africa
- Province: KwaZulu-Natal
- District: uThukela
- Seat: Wasbank
- Wards: 10

Government
  - Type: Municipal council
  - Mayor: Nkosinathi Berrington Mchunu

Area
  - Total: 992 km^{2} (383 sq mi)

Population (2011)
  - Total: 103,116
  - Density: 104/km^{2} (269/sq mi)

Racial makeup (2011)
  - Black African: 99.6%
  - Coloured: 0.1%
  - Indian/Asian: 0.2%
  - White: 0.1%

First languages (2011)
  - Zulu: 95.9%
  - Southern Ndebele: 1.2%
  - Other: 2.9%
- Time zone: UTC+2 (SAST)
- Municipal code: KZN233

Indaka Local Municipality was an administrative area in the Uthukela District of KwaZulu-Natal in South Africa. The municipality is named after the Indaka River that runs through the municipal area.

Indaka is a predominantly rural municipality, and has no national roads running through it. Indaka's economy is currently relying on subsistence agriculture, government services and private household employment.

After municipal elections on 3 August 2016 it was merged into the larger Alfred Duma Local Municipality.

== Main places ==
The 2001 census divided the municipality into the following main places:

Place	Code	Area (km^{2})	Population
Ekuvukeni	51501	2.62	12,384
Ingwe	51503	75.19	5,203
Kliprivier	51504	1.04	998
Mabaso	51505	83.50	7,034
Mbhense	51506	15.32	8,895
Mchunu	51507	107.28	19,417
Mthembu	51508	338.79	23,000
Nxumalo	51509	45.61	9,205
Sgweje	51510	19.00	8,015
Sithole	51511	199.91	18,742
Remainder of the municipality	51502	103.75	747

== Politics ==
The municipal council consists of twenty members elected by mixed-member proportional representation. Ten councillors are elected by first-past-the-post voting in ten wards, while the remaining ten are chosen from party lists so that the total number of party representatives is proportional to the number of votes received.

In the election of 18 May 2011 no party obtained a majority; the Inkatha Freedom Party (IFP) won eight seats while the African National Congress (ANC) and National Freedom Party (NFP) won six seats each. The ANC and NFP formed a coalition to govern the municipality. The following table shows the results of the election.

Party	Votes				Seats		
Party	Ward	List	Total	%	Ward	List	Total
IFP	9,710	9,780	19,490	37.5	5	3	8
ANC	7,622	8,015	15,637	30.1	2	4	6
NFP	7,443	7,444	14,887	28.6	3	3	6
DA	511	527	1,038	2.0	0	0	0
Independent	327	–	327	0.6	0	–	0
ACDP	198	125	323	0.6	0	0	0
COPE	146	135	281	0.5	0	0	0
Total	25,957	26,026	51,983	100.0	10	10	20
Spoilt votes	455	434	889				
