= Emnambithi-Ladysmith Local Municipality =

Emnambithi/Ladysmith
- Local municipality
- Seal

- Location of Emnambithi-Ladysmith Local Municipality within KwaZulu-Natal
- Coordinates: 28°33′S 29°47′E
- Country: South Africa
- Province: KwaZulu-Natal
- District: uThukela
- Seat: Ladysmith
- Wards: 27

Government
  - Type: Municipal council
  - Mayor: Mrs D. C. P. Mazibuko

Area
  - Total: 2,965 km^{2} (1,145 sq mi)

Population (2011)
  - Total: 237,437
  - Density: 80.08/km^{2} (207.4/sq mi)

Racial makeup (2011)
  - Black African: 91.8%
  - Coloured: 1.0%
  - Indian/Asian: 4.4%
  - White: 2.7%

First languages (2011)
  - Zulu: 86.2%
  - English: 7.4%
  - Afrikaans: 2.2%
  - Southern Ndebele: 1.1%
  - Other: 3.1%
- Time zone: UTC+2 (SAST)
- Municipal code: KZN232

Emnambithi-Ladysmith Local Municipality was a municipality in the Uthukela District Municipality, KwaZulu-Natal, South Africa. It is accessible from the N3 and N11 national highways.

The town of Ladysmith is the economic hub of the municipality; it accommodates the municipal offices, major schools, main police station and magistrates court, as well as a variety of commercial, industrial, and retail outlets.

After municipal elections on 3 August 2016 it was merged into the larger Alfred Duma Local Municipality.

== Main places ==
The 2001 census divided the municipality into the following main places:

Place	Code	Area (km^{2})	Population	Most spoken language
Abantungwa/Kholwa	51401	245.25	57,273	Zulu
Colenso	51402	4.90	4,476	Zulu
Ezakheni	51404	39.00	59,943	Zulu
Kliprivier NU	51406	2.80	381	Zulu
Kliprivier	51405	107.21	27,696	Zulu
Ladysmith	51407	91.97	41,425	Zulu
Mchunu	51408	34.42	2,301	Zulu
Mthembu	51409	80.70	6,920	Zulu
Mvelani	51410	2.43	11,898	Zulu
Nkankezi	51411	4.86	824	Zulu
Remainder of the municipality	51403	2,350.72	12,316	Zulu

== Politics ==
The municipal council consists of fifty-three members elected by mixed-member proportional representation. Twenty-seven councillors are elected by first-past-the-post voting in twenty-seven wards, while the remaining twenty-six are chosen from party lists so that the total number of party representatives is proportional to the number of votes received. In the election of 18 May 2011 the African National Congress (ANC) won a majority of thirty-four seats on the council. The following table shows the results of the election.

Party	Votes				Seats		
Party	Ward	List	Total	%	Ward	List	Total
ANC	38,323	39,333	77,656	63.4	25	9	34
IFP	9,698	9,475	19,173	15.6	0	8	8
NFP	6,978	6,630	13,608	11.1	0	6	6
DA	4,746	4,664	9,410	7.7	2	2	4
MF	662	507	1,169	1.0	0	1	1
ACDP	348	318	666	0.5	0	0	0
AZAPO	101	207	308	0.3	0	0	0
COPE	96	146	242	0.2	0	0	0
Independent	192	–	192	0.2	0	–	0
National Democratic Convention	79	37	116	0.1	0	0	0
Total	61,223	61,317	122,540	100.0	27	26	53
Spoilt votes	994	894	1,888				
