= Ekuvukeni =

- Location within KwaZulu-Natal Location within South Africa
- Coordinates: 28.466°S 30.157°E
- Country: South Africa
- Province: KwaZulu-Natal
- District: Uthukela
- Municipality: Alfred Duma

Area
  - Total: 3.17 km^{2} (1.22 sq mi)

Population (2011)
  - Total: 11,018
  - Density: 3,480/km^{2} (9,000/sq mi)

Racial makeup (2011)
  - Black African: 99.5%
  - Coloured: 0.1%
  - Indian/Asian: 0.3%
  - White: 0.1%

First languages (2011)
  - Zulu: 92.3%
  - Sign language: 2.1%
  - S. Ndebele: 0.1%
  - English: 0.5%
  - Other: 2.2%
- Time zone: UTC+2 (SAST)
- PO box: 3383
- Area code: 034

Ekuvukeni is a town in Uthukela District Municipality in the KwaZulu-Natal province of South Africa that was established in 1972.
