= Driefontein, KwaZulu-Natal =

Driefontein
- Location within KwaZulu-Natal Location within South Africa
- Coordinates: 28.345°S 29.705°E
- Country: South Africa
- Province: KwaZulu-Natal
- District: uThukela
- Municipality: Alfred Duma

Area
  - Total: 41.44 km^{2} (16.00 sq mi)

Population (2011)
  - Total: 6,774
  - Density: 163.5/km^{2} (423.4/sq mi)

Racial makeup (2011)
  - Black African: 99.9%
  - Indian/Asian: 0.1%

First languages (2011)
  - Zulu: 96.5%
  - S. Ndebele: 1.1%
  - Tswana: 1.0%
  - Other: 1.4%
- Time zone: UTC+2 (SAST)
- PO box: 3379

Driefontein is a town in Uthukela District Municipality in the KwaZulu-Natal province of South Africa.
