= Mbazwana =

- Location within KwaZulu-Natal Location within South Africa
- Coordinates: 27.500°S 32.579°E
- Country: South Africa
- Province: KwaZulu-Natal
- District: uMkhanyakude
- Municipality: uMhlabuyalingana

Area
  - Total: 10.11 km^{2} (3.90 sq mi)

Population (2011)
  - Total: 4,312
  - Density: 426.5/km^{2} (1,105/sq mi)

Racial makeup (2011)
  - Black African: 98.9%
  - Coloured: 0.4%
  - Indian/Asian: 0.3%
  - White: 0.3%

First languages (2011)
  - Zulu: 93.8%
  - English: 1.7%
  - S. Ndebele: 1.4%
  - Other: 3.1%
- Time zone: UTC+2 (SAST)
- PO box: 3974
- Area code: 035

Mbazwana is a town in Umhlabuyalingana Local Municipality and is part of Umkhanyakude District Municipality in the KwaZulu-Natal province of South Africa.

The settlement and plantation is 50 km east of Ubombo. The town presumably takes its name from the tributary of the Mseleni. The name, of Zulu origin, is said to mean ‘small axe’, after a person called Mbazwana.
