= Umtshezi Local Municipality =

Coordinates: 29°00′17″S 29°52′19″E

Umtshezi
- Local municipality
- Seal

- Location in KwaZulu-Natal
- Country: South Africa
- Province: KwaZulu-Natal
- District: uThukela
- Seat: Estcourt
- Wards: 9

Government
  - Type: Municipal council
  - Mayor: Bongani Dlamini (African National Congress)

Area
  - Total: 1,972 km^{2} (761 sq mi)

Population (2011)
  - Total: 83,153
  - Density: 42.17/km^{2} (109.2/sq mi)

Racial makeup (2011)
  - Black African: 90.2%
  - Coloured: 1.4%
  - Indian/Asian: 5.8%
  - White: 2.3%

First languages (2011)
  - Zulu: 84.7%
  - English: 10.7%
  - Southern Ndebele: 1.2%
  - Afrikaans: 1.1%
  - Other: 2.3%
- Time zone: UTC+2 (SAST)
- Municipal code: KZN234

Umtshezi Local Municipality was an administrative area in the Uthukela District of KwaZulu-Natal in South Africa. uMtshezi is an isiZulu name word for Bushman or San. The name uMtshezi refers to the Bushman River. After municipal elections on 3 August 2016, it was merged into the larger Inkosi Langalibalele Local Municipality.

== Main places ==
The 2001 census divided the municipality into the following main places:

Place	Code	Area (km^{2})	Population
Estcourt	51601	14.47	13,958
Khwezi	51602	14.45	2,978
Kwanobamba	51603	0.99	2,702
Weenen	51605	2.24	1,157
Wembezi	51606	18.29	17,497
Remainder of the municipality	51604	2,079.51	21,630

== Politics ==
The municipal council consisted of seventeen members elected by mixed-member proportional representation. Nine councillors were elected by first-past-the-post voting in nine wards, while the remaining eight were chosen from party lists so that the total number of party representatives was proportional to the number of votes received. In the election of 18 May 2011 no party obtained a majority; the African National Congress won eight seats, the Inkatha Freedom Party five, and the National Freedom Party three. The following table shows the results of the election.

Party	Votes				Seats		
Party	Ward	List	Total	%	Ward	List	Total
ANC	10,945	11,027	21,972	46.2	6	2	8
IFP	6,196	6,191	12,387	26.1	2	3	5
NFP	4,633	4,610	9,243	19.4	1	2	3
DA	1,831	1,801	3,632	7.6	0	1	1
MF	159	138	297	0.6	0	0	0
Total	23,764	23,767	47,531	100.0	9	8	17
Spoilt votes	385	341	726				

The ANC and the NFP formed a coalition to govern the majority. Subsequently, the ANC won a by-election in a ward previously held by the IFP, giving the ANC a majority of nine seats.
