= Ladysmith Airport =

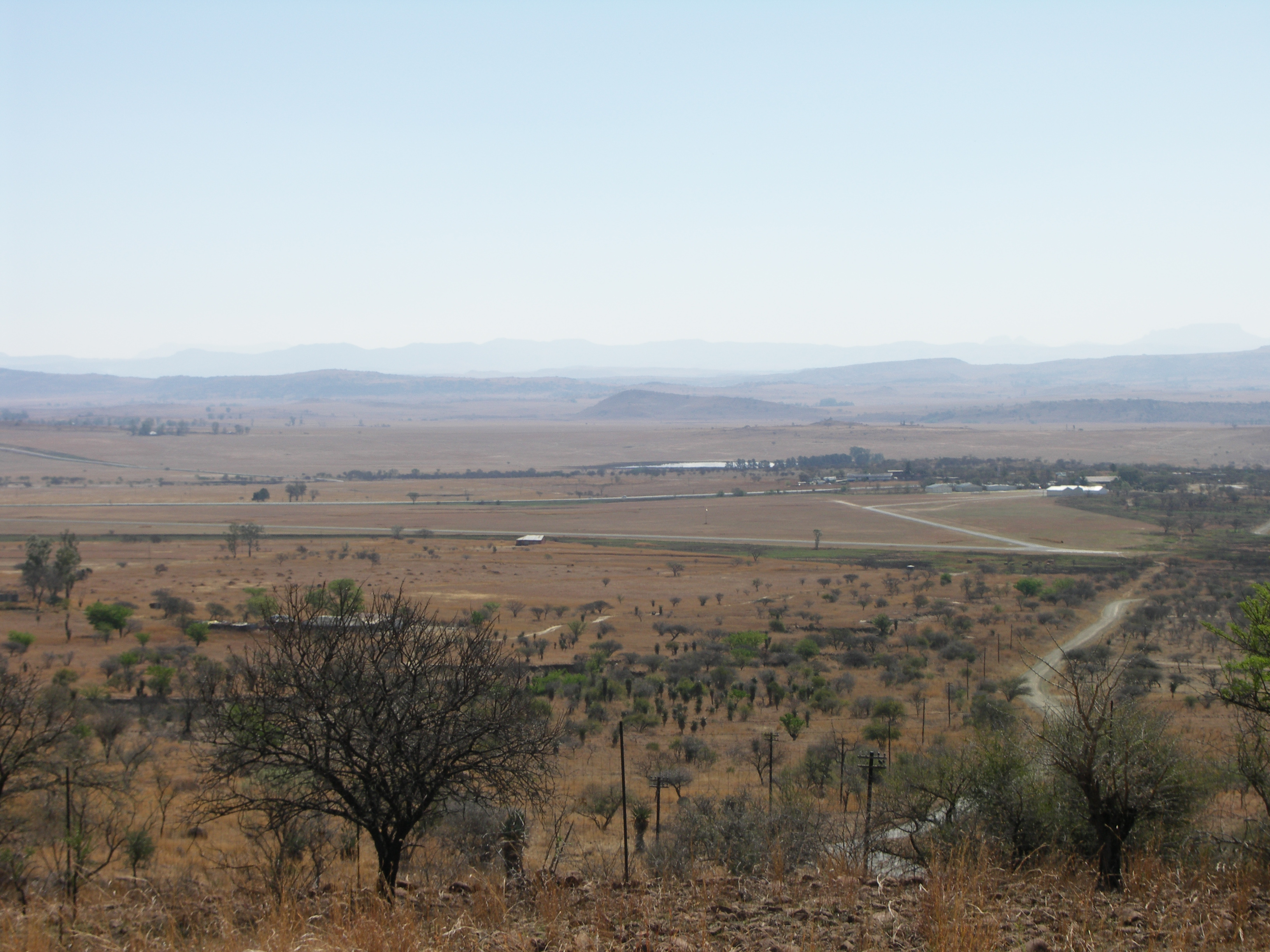
- Ladysmith Airport seen from Platrand
- IATA: LAY; ICAO: FALY

Summary
- Airport type: Public
- Owner: JetVision Holdings Pty Ltd
- Operator: JetVision Airports Pty Ltd
- Location: Ladysmith, KwaZulu-Natal, South Africa
- Elevation AMSL: 3,548 ft (1,081 m)
- Coordinates: 28°34.8′S 029°45.2′E
- Website: www.jetvisionairways.com

Map
- Location in KwaZulu-Natal

Runways
Direction	Length		Surface
Direction	m	ft	Surface
11/29	1,200	3,937	Asphalt
- Source: South African AIP, DAFIF

Ladysmith Airport (IATA: LAY, ICAO: FALY) is an airport serving Ladysmith, a town in the KwaZulu-Natal province in South Africa.

== Facilities ==
The airport is located on the outskirts of town just below Platrand at 28°34′48″S 29°45′10″E at an elevation of 3,548 feet (1,081 m) above mean sea level. It has one runway designated 11/29 with an asphalt surface measuring 1,200 by 15 metres (3,937 ft × 49 ft). NDB is LY397.5 and VOR is LYV116.5. The airport is now managed by JetVision Airports Pty Ltd,
