= Mseleni =

- Location within KwaZulu-Natal Location within South Africa
- Coordinates: 27.372°S 32.539°E
- Country: South Africa
- Province: KwaZulu-Natal
- District: uMkhanyakude
- Municipality: uMhlabuyalingana

Area
  - Total: 6.66 km^{2} (2.57 sq mi)

Population (2011)
  - Total: 985
  - Density: 148/km^{2} (383/sq mi)

Racial makeup (2011)
  - Black African: 99.7%
  - Indian/Asian: 0.1%
  - White: 0.1%
  - Other: 0.1%

First languages (2011)
  - Zulu: 96.3%
  - Tswana: 1.2%
  - Other: 2.4%
- Time zone: UTC+2 (SAST)
- PO box: 4810

Mseleni is a small settlement in Umhlabuyalingana Maputaland, northern KwaZulu-Natal, South Africa. It is situated not far away from the small town of Mbazwana. It is divided into 2 small izigodi namely KwaJobe and KwaNhlamvu, ruled under the Authority of Nkosi J Nxumalo of Mabaso Tribal Authority.

Mseleni Hospital is a 184-bed hospital which is split into 6 wards (labour, female surgical, paediatrics, male, female medical and isolation wards). The hospital runs 8 clinics in a catchment area of 100 km x 30 km. It has an outpatients' department, therapy department, a radiography department with x-ray and ultrasound machines, a pharmacy and a laboratory.

Education is provided by Mseleni Lower Primary School, New Era School, Mzila School, Zenzeleni High School and Justice Nxumalo Technical High School which was named after Nkosi Justice Nxumalo of the Mabaso Tribal Authority.

The local community development co-operative, Vuka Mabaso, provides a community hall, small business premises, market, library, and Internet café and computer training centre.

Mseleni Children's Home, provides a place of safety and education for around 30 children. Based at the Children's Home, the AIDS orphan support programme Lulisandla Kumntwana (reach out to the child) is a church-based programme providing support to around 3000 orphans. Mseleni Children's Home is a project of Serving In Mission.

Mseleni is 3 km from Lake Sibhayi, a well known lake to everyone who grew up at Mseleni and to every young child living there, and it is 35 km from Sodwana Bay, a popular tourist destination.
