= Imbabazane Local Municipality =

Imbabazane
- Local municipality
- Seal

- Location in KwaZulu-Natal
- Coordinates: 29°00′S 29°53′E
- Country: South Africa
- Province: KwaZulu-Natal
- District: uThukela
- Seat: Ntabamhlophe, Estcourt
- Wards: 13

Government
  - Type: Municipal council
  - Mayor: Hlanganani Dlamini

Area
  - Total: 1,426 km^{2} (551 sq mi)

Population (2011)
  - Total: 113,073
  - Density: 79.29/km^{2} (205.4/sq mi)

Racial makeup (2011)
  - Black African: 99.5%
  - Coloured: 0.1%
  - Indian/Asian: 0.1%
  - White: 0.2%

First languages (2011)
  - Zulu: 95.4%
  - English: 1.5%
  - Southern Ndebele: 1.2%
  - Other: 1.9%
- Time zone: UTC+2 (SAST)
- Municipal code: KZN236

Imbabazane Local Municipality was an administrative area in the Uthukela District of KwaZulu-Natal in South Africa. Imbabazane is the name of an African tree. After municipal elections on 3 August 2016 it was merged into the larger Inkosi Langalibalele Local Municipality.

== Main places ==
The 2001 census divided the municipality into the following main places:

| Place | Code | Area (km^{2}) | Population |
|---|---|---|---|
| Abambo | 51801 | 45.88 | 9,554 |
| Amangwe | 51802 | 285.43 | 43,535 |
| Dlamini | 51803 | 25.29 | 3,983 |
| Estcourt | 51804 | 66.27 | 11,772 |
| Hlubi | 51805 | 29.71 | 4,697 |
| Mabaso | 51807 | 46.71 | 15,849 |
| Mhlungwini | 51808 | 59.10 | 22,274 |
| Zwelisha | 51809 | 9.79 | 7,211 |
| Remainder of the municipality | 51806 | 284.42 | 1,067 |

== Politics ==
The municipal council consisted of twenty-five members elected by mixed-member proportional representation. Thirteen councillors were elected by first-past-the-post voting in thirteen wards, while the remaining twelve were chosen from party lists so that the total number of party representatives was proportional to the number of votes received. In the election of 18 May 2011 no party obtained a majority; the African National Congress won twelve seats, the National Freedom Party seven, and the Inkatha Freedom Party five. The ANC and NFP formed a coalition to govern the municipality. The following table shows the results of the election.

| Party | Votes | | | | Seats | | |
| Party | Ward | List | Total | % | Ward | List | Total |
|---|---|---|---|---|---|---|---|
| ANC | 14,823 | 15,135 | 29,958 | 49.2 | 11 | 1 | 12 |
| NFP | 8,435 | 8,084 | 16,519 | 27.2 | 1 | 6 | 7 |
| IFP | 6,498 | 6,749 | 13,247 | 21.8 | 1 | 4 | 5 |
| DA | 586 | 524 | 1,110 | 1.8 | 0 | 1 | 1 |
| Total | 30,342 | 30,492 | 60,834 | 100.0 | 13 | 12 | 25 |
| Spoilt votes | 841 | 714 | 1,555 | | | | |
