= 14 Shabalala =

"14" Shabalala
- Born: Mhlahleni James Shabalala; Mantosi, Bergville, KwaZulu-Natal
- Genres: Maskandi, Folk
- Instrument: Guitar
- Label: 3rd Ear Music

Mhlahleni James "14" Shabalala (died June 2007) was a South African Maskandi musician who came from Bergville in KwaZulu-Natal. He was part of the alternative music scene in South Africa. Shabalala was very popular as a result of his live performances at festivals and concerts throughout the country. He performed at the Splashy Fen festivals in the 1990s, and toured with musicians such as Joseph Shabalala and Ladysmith Black Mambazo.

== Early career ==
"14" Shabalala was born on a farm called Mantosi in Bergville, KwaZulu-Natal. According to the Durban Daily News, "He had been nicknamed '14' Shabalala by his grandmother because he was apparently abandoned by his mother when he was 14 days old." Shabalala was not educated and could not read or write and only spoke isiZulu and Afrikaans learned through conversations.

By the late 1970s, Shabalala went to Johannesburg in search of work. He bought his first guitar in 1981 and started singing for a living. Through his performances, he met well-known musicians such as Blondie Makhene and Brenda Fassie that advised him to go back to KwaZulu-Natal if he wanted to be a successful maskandi musician.

He went back to the province and won a maskandi competition in 1989 at the University of KwaZulu-Natal where the price was a recording contract with 3rd Ear Music. 3rd Ear Music promoted many of Shabalala's shows and eventually introduced the musicians to Ladysmith Black Mambazo.

== Late career ==
Through his connection at 3rd Ear Music, Shabalala performed at Splashy Fen's 1990 and 1991 festivals respectively and recorded with 3rd Ear Music in 1990. Shabalala also featured on several recorded compilations. This included his dedication to Nelson Mandela featured on the Mandela Peace Rally recorded at Kings Park in Durban 26 Durban 1990. As an opening act, Shabalala also toured the United Kingdom with Joseph Shabalala and Ladysmith Black Mambazo in 2002.

Shabalala mostly played at festivals and his music was popular among his audiences, he however could not sell his CDs or cassettes in music shops as a result of Apartheid pressure. He was known for his trademark whistling words personalising each song with a string of deep Zulu singing clicks and percussive whistles as well as his personal guitar with 5 nylon strings with the high E string missing. His influences ranged from American country rock to flamenco, mixed into Zulu walking-pick, as well as rhythms of highlife and Zimbabwean chimurenga.

== Death ==
Shabalala died of liver cancer at his Bergville home, following a lengthy illness.

His archival material including photographs, vinyl records, letters and documents, are in the Hidden Years Music Archive, preserved at the Documentation Centre for Music, Stellenbosch University in 2017.

== Discography ==
"14" Shabalala released an album through 3rd Ear Music in 1991 called Is' Tofu Esisha.

Track listing
No.	Title	Length
1.	"Is' Tofu Eshisa (New Stove)"	3:57
2.	"Ijuba (Pigeon)"	4:24
3.	"Uphamaphi 14 (Where Do You Come From, 14?)"	5:30
4.	"Washo Nolinowe (You Said It, Nalinowe)"	2:50
5.	"Sizwe"	4:25
6.	"Wemdi Ungaboyingena Eyababli (Do Not Interfere)"	4:21
7.	"Uyamazi U- 14 (Do You Know 14)"	5:06
8.	"Nkulunkulu Kaminayaza (God of Kaminayza)"	4:00
9.	"Ngihmaba Ngiyafuna"	3:30
10.	"Is' Tofu Esisha (New Stove)"	3:57
