= Kliprivier, Uthukela =

Kliprivier
- Location within KwaZulu-Natal Location within South Africa
- Coordinates: 28.509°S 30.297°E
- Country: South Africa
- Province: KwaZulu-Natal
- District: uThukela
- Municipality: Alfred Duma

Area
  - Total: 3.50 km^{2} (1.35 sq mi)

Population (2011)
  - Total: 1,514
  - Density: 433/km^{2} (1,120/sq mi)

Racial makeup (2011)
  - Black African: 99.7%
  - Coloured: 0.3%
  - Indian/Asian: 0.1%

First languages (2011)
  - Zulu: 92.9%
  - English: 3.9%
  - S. Ndebele: 1.9%
  - Other: 1.3%
- Time zone: UTC+2 (SAST)
- PO box: 1871

Kliprivier is a town in Uthukela District Municipality in the KwaZulu-Natal province of South Africa.
