= Hlongwane =

Hlongwane is a surname. Notable people with the surname include:

- Bongokuhle Hlongwane (born 2000), South African soccer player
- Fana Hlongwane, South African politician and businessman
- Samuel Hlongwane (born 1962), South African Navy officer
- Thomas Hlongwane (1962–2006), South African soccer player
