= Driefontein, North West =

Driefontein
- Location within North West (South African province) Location within South Africa
- Coordinates: 25.138°S 25.966°E
- Country: South Africa
- Province: North West
- District: Ngaka Modiri Molema
- Municipality: Ramotshere Moiloa

Area
  - Total: 7.64 km^{2} (2.95 sq mi)

Population (2011)
  - Total: 4,215
  - Density: 552/km^{2} (1,430/sq mi)

Racial makeup (2011)
  - Black African: 99.4%
  - Indian/Asian: 0.4%
  - Other: 0.1%

First languages (2011)
  - Tswana: 92.6%
  - English: 2.6%
  - Zulu: 1.8%
  - S. Ndebele: 1.1%
  - Other: 1.9%
- Time zone: UTC+2 (SAST)
- PO box: 3379

Driefontein is a town in Ngaka Modiri Molema District Municipality in the North West province of South Africa.
