= Qedusizi Dam =

- Interactive map of Qedusizi Dam
- Official name: Qedusizi Dam
- Location: KwaZulu-Natal, South Africa
- Coordinates: 28°32′31″S 29°44′41″E
- Construction began: 1994
- Opening date: 1997 November 21
- Operators: Department of Water Affairs and Forestry

Dam and spillways
- Type of dam: Composite: Roller-compacted concrete spillway, earth-fill embankments
- Impounds: Klip River
- Height: 24.3m
- Length: 1 437 m

Reservoir
- Creates: Qedusizi Dam
- Total capacity: 194 000 000 m^{3}
- Catchment area: 1585 km^{2}
- Surface area: 2 513 ha

Qedusizi Dam, previously known as the Mt Pleasant Dam, is a composite type dam with a roller-compacted concrete (RCC) or 'rollcrete' spillway and earth-fill embankments. It is located on the Klip River in KwaZulu-Natal, South Africa upstream of the town of Ladysmith. Site preparation began in 1994, was completed in 1997 and serves mainly as a flood attenuation and control dam to reduce flooding in the town of Ladysmith. The town is located in a loop of the Klip River and was established there primarily for defense reasons in 1847 by Boers before being annexed by the British. It has experienced numerous floods ever since.

The outlet at the base of the dam is uncontrolled with a maximum flow capacity of 400 m^{3}s^{−1}. The hazard potential of the dam has been ranked high (3).

== See also ==
- List of reservoirs and dams in South Africa
