= Mashabane =

Mashabane is a South-African surname. Notable people with the surname include:

- Maite Nkoana-Mashabane (born 1963), South African politician
- Norman Mashabane (1956–2007), South African ambassador to Indonesia
