= Klip River (KwaZulu-Natal) =

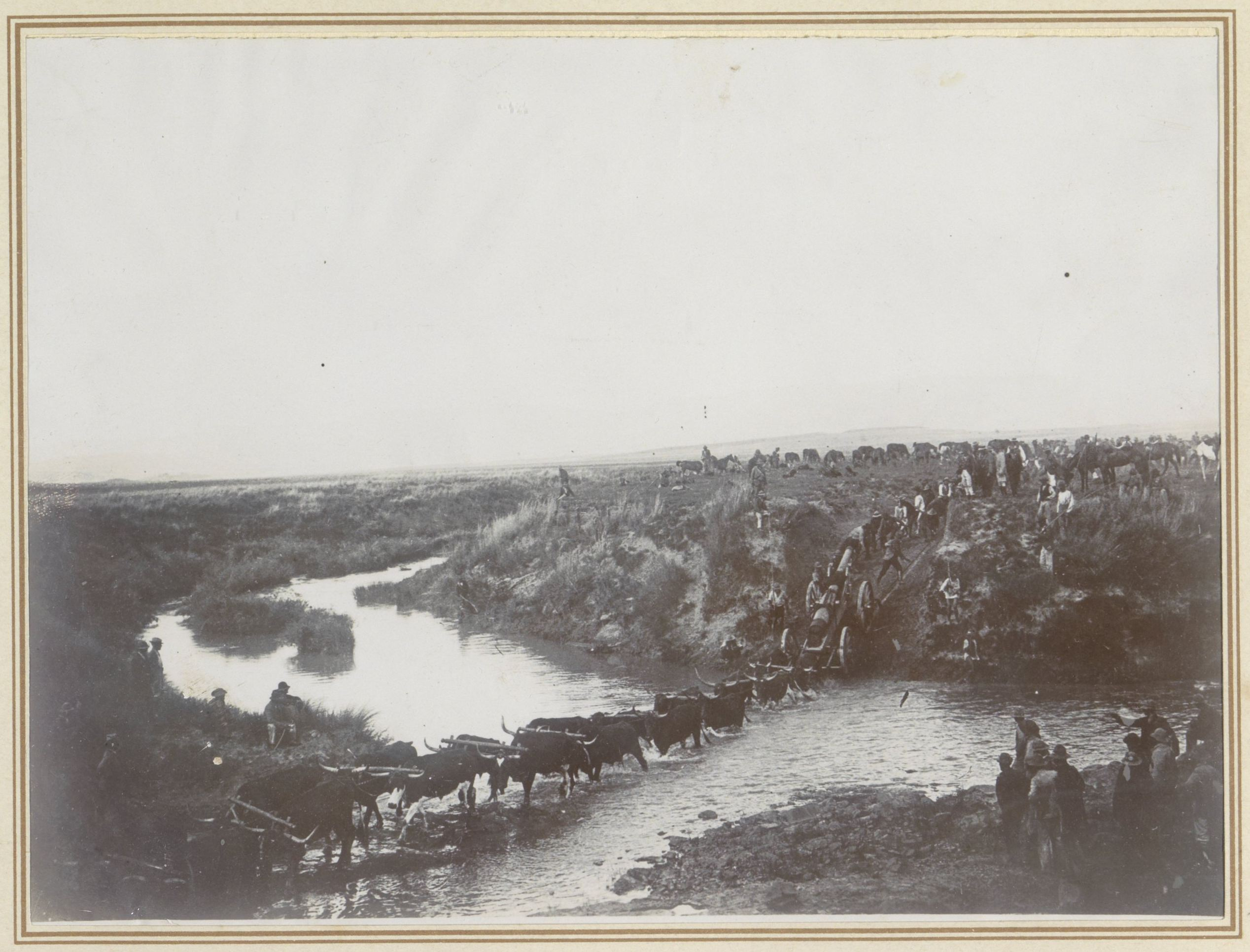

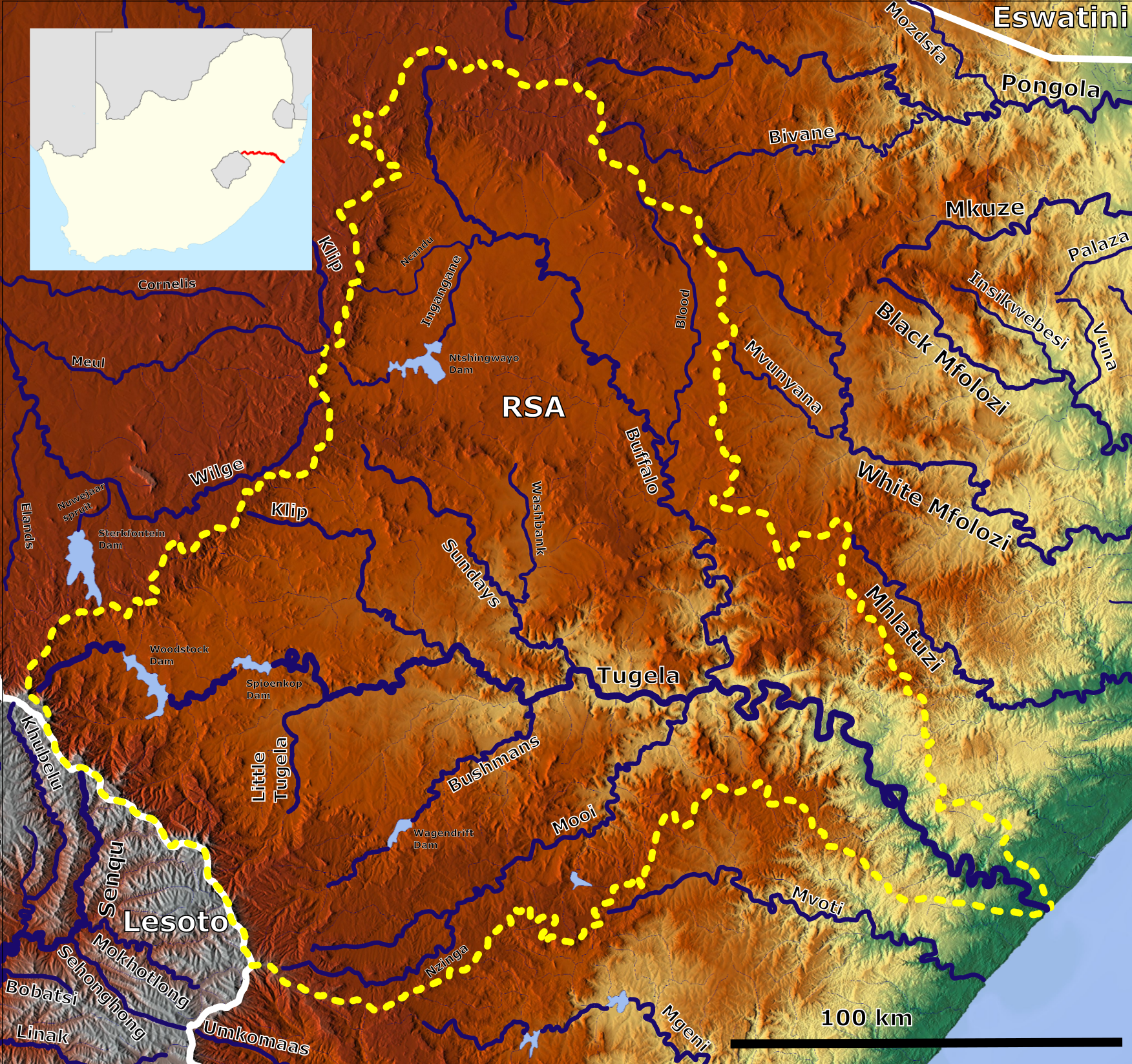
- The Klip River in the Tugela catchment area (center left)

Location
- Country: South Africa
- Province: KwaZulu-Natal
- City: Ladysmith

Physical characteristics
- Mouth: Tugela River
  - coordinates: 28°39′53″S 29°57′42″E

The Klip River is a main tributary of the Tugela River in KwaZulu-Natal, South Africa. The river originates on the west side of KwaZulu-Natal, initially flows eastward and then swings southward. It flows into the Windsor Dam, and then into the larger Qedusizi Dam before flowing east again. The river passes through Ladysmith before joining the Tugela River.

For a brief period in the mid-19th century, a Klip River Republic was declared in the area by Boer settlers, before being annexed by the British.
