= Mabaso =

Mabaso is a South African surname that may refer to

- Abel Mabaso (born 1991), South African association football defender
- Mduduzi Mabaso (born 1976), South African actor
- Tshegofatso Mabaso (born 1996), South African association football forward
- Themba Mabaso, director of South Africa Bureau of Heraldry
