= Inkosi Langalibalele Local Municipality =

Inkosi Langalibalele
- Local municipality
- Coordinates: 28.929°S 29.889°E
- Country: South Africa
- Province: KwaZulu-Natal
- District: uThukela
- Seat: Estcourt
- Wards: 24

Government
  - Type: Municipal council
  - Mayor: Mduduzi T Myeza (IFP)
  - Deputy Mayor: Nhlanhla S Dladla (IFP)
  - Speaker: S W Khumalo (IFP)

Area
  - Total: 3,399 km^{2} (1,312 sq mi)

Population (2011)
  - Total: 196,226
  - Density: 57.73/km^{2} (149.5/sq mi)
- Time zone: UTC+2 (SAST)
- Municipal code: KZN237

Inkosi Langalibalele Municipality (Zulu: UMasipala we Nkosi Langalibalele) is a local municipality within the uThukela District Municipality, in the KwaZulu-Natal province of South Africa. It was established after the 2016 South African municipal elections by merging the Imbabazane and uMtshezi local municipalities.

== Politics ==
The municipal council consists of forty-seven members elected by mixed-member proportional representation. Twenty-four councillors were elected by first-past-the-post voting in twenty-four wards, while the remaining twenty-three were chosen from party lists so that the total number of party representatives was proportional to the number of votes received.

In the election of 4 November 2026, the Inkatha Freedom Party (IFP) won a plurality of nineteen seats on the council.

The following table shows the results of the election.

Party	Ward			List			Total seats
Party	Votes	%	Seats	Votes	%	Seats	Total seats
Inkatha Freedom Party	25,750	40.28	16	26,423	41.36	3	19
uMkhonto weSizwe Party	17,057	26.68	4	18,135	28.39	9	13
African National Congress	10,042	15.71	0	9,908	15.51	7	7
Democratic Alliance	5,702	8.92	3	5,668	8.87	1	4
National Freedom Party	1,407	2.20	0	1,211	1.90	1	1
National Peoples Ambassadors	943	1.47	0	903	1.41	1	1
Independent candidates	1,300	2.03	1				1
Economic Freedom Fighters	460	0.72	0	492	0.77	1	1
10 other parties	1,272	1.99	0	1,144	1.79	0	0
Total	63,933	100.00	24	63,884	100.00	23	47
Valid votes	63,933	98.88		63,884	98.82		
Invalid/blank votes	722	1.12		761	1.18		
Total votes	64,655	100.00		64,645	100.00		
Registered voters/turnout	110,203	58.67		110,203	58.66		
