= Alfred Duma Local Municipality =

- Local municipality
- Map of KwaZulu-Natal with Alfred Duma highlighted
- Country: South Africa
- Province: KwaZulu-Natal
- District: uThukela
- Seat: Ladysmith

Government
  - Type: Municipal council

Area
  - Total: 3,764 km^{2} (1,453 sq mi)

Population (2011)
  - Total: 340,553
  - Density: 90.48/km^{2} (234.3/sq mi)
- Time zone: UTC+2 (SAST)
- Municipal code: KZN238

Alfred Duma Municipality (Zulu: UMasipala wase Alfred Duma) is a local municipality within the uThukela District Municipality, in the KwaZulu-Natal province of South Africa. It was established for the August 2016 local elections by merging the Emnambithi/Ladysmith and Indaka local municipalities.

== Politics ==
The municipal council consists of seventy-three members elected by mixed-member proportional representation. Thirty-seven councillors are elected by first-past-the-post voting in thirty-seven wards, while the remaining thirty-six are chosen from party lists so that the total number of party representatives is proportional to the number of votes received.

In 2026, the Inkatha Freedom Party dropped to twenty-four seats, but remained the largest party.

The following table shows the results of the election.

Party	Ward			List			Total seats
Party	Votes	%	Seats	Votes	%	Seats	Total seats
Inkatha Freedom Party	32,000	32.53	13	31,620	32.16	11	24
uMkhonto weSizwe Party	28,513	28.98	17	29,809	30.32	5	22
African National Congress	21,588	21.94	3	21,054	21.42	13	16
Democratic Alliance	6,032	6.13	3	6,374	6.48	2	5
Abantu Bezwelethu Congress Democracy	4,219	4.29	1	4,110	4.18	2	3
Economic Freedom Fighters	1,635	1.66	0	1,594	1.62	1	1
South African Communist Party	801	0.81	0	761	0.77	1	1
Afrika Mayibuye Movement	500	0.51	0	438	0.45	1	1
Independent candidates	657	0.67	0				0
13 other parties	2,434	2.47	0	2,548	2.59	0	0
Total	98,379	100.00	37	98,308	100.00	36	73
Valid votes	98,379	98.53		98,308	98.54		
Invalid/blank votes	1,472	1.47		1,458	1.46		
Total votes	99,851	100.00		99,766	100.00		
Registered voters/turnout	181,335	55.06		181,335	55.02		
