= Ladysmith, KwaZulu-Natal =

Town in KwaZulu-Natal, South Africa

Ladysmith Emnambithi
- uMnambithi
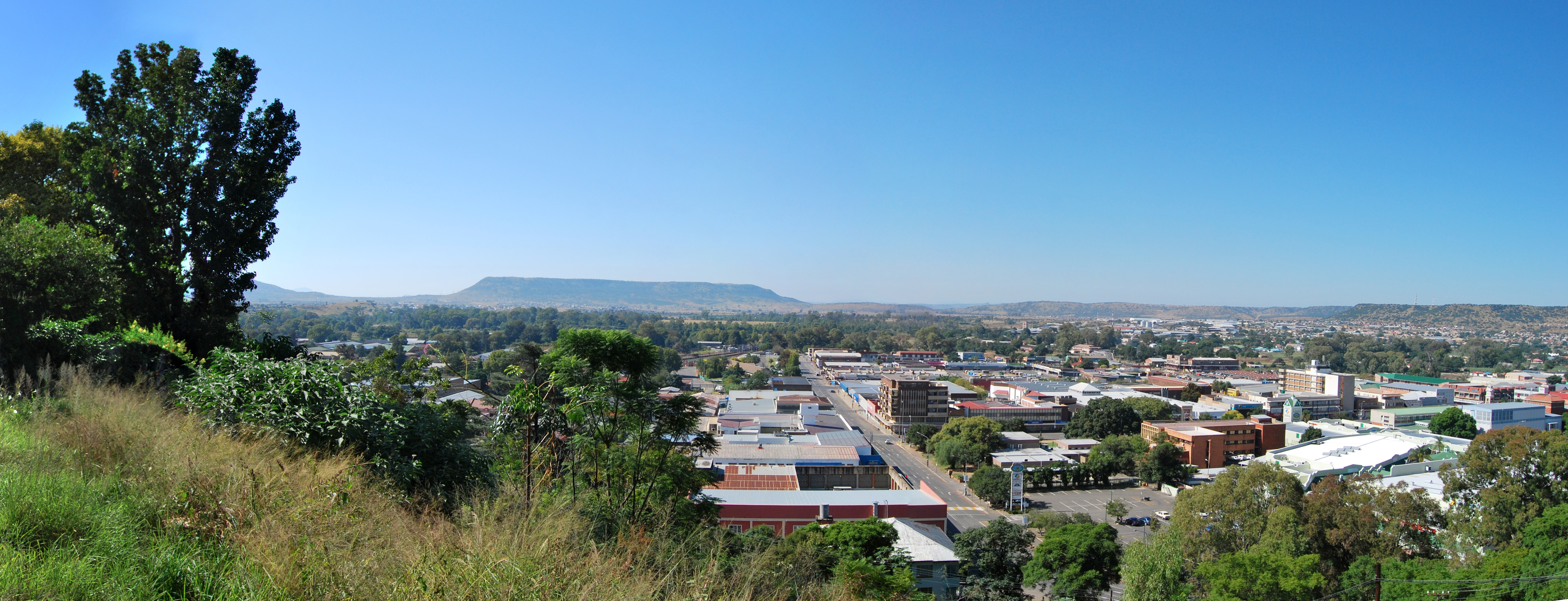
- Ladysmith central business district

- Location within KwaZulu-Natal Location within South Africa Location within Africa
- Coordinates: 28°33′35″S 29°46′50″E
- Country: South Africa
- Province: KwaZulu-Natal
- District: Uthukela
- Municipality: Alfred Duma
- Established: 1850

Area
  - Total: 84.13 km^{2} (32.48 sq mi)

Population (2011)
  - Total: 64,855
  - Density: 770.9/km^{2} (1,997/sq mi)

Racial makeup (2011)
  - Black African: 73.3%
  - Indian/Asian: 15.0%
  - White: 8.3%
  - Coloured: 2.9%
  - Other: 0.5%

First languages (2011)
  - Zulu: 64.3%
  - English: 22.8%
  - Afrikaans: 6.3%
  - Sotho: 2.2%
  - Other: 4.5%
- Time zone: UTC+2 (SAST)
- Postal code (street): 3370
- PO box: 3370
- Area code: 036
- Website: ladysmith.kzn.org.za

Ladysmith, officially known as uMnambithi since 2024, is a town that serves as the seat of both the Alfred Duma Local Municipality and the Uthukela District Municipality in KwaZulu-Natal, South Africa. It lies 230 kilometres (140 mi) north-west of Durban and 365 kilometres (227 mi) south-east of Johannesburg. Important industries in the area include food processing, textiles, and tyre production.

The town was named after Juana María de los Dolores de León Smith, also known as "Lady Smith," the Spanish wife of Sir Harry Smith, the Governor of the Cape Colony from 1847–1852. It held strategic importance during the Second Boer War when, after numerous small skirmishes, it was besieged by Boer forces on 2 November 1899. After three British attempts to relieve the defenders and one Boer attempt to take the town all failed, the siege was eventually broken on 28 February 1900. Both Winston Churchill and Mahatma Gandhi were present at the siege, the former as a war correspondent and the latter as a stretcher-bearer.

In 1900, the unincorporated town of Oyster Harbour on the east coast of Vancouver Island, British Columbia, Canada, was renamed Ladysmith by James Dunsmuir in honour of the lifting of the siege of Ladysmith.

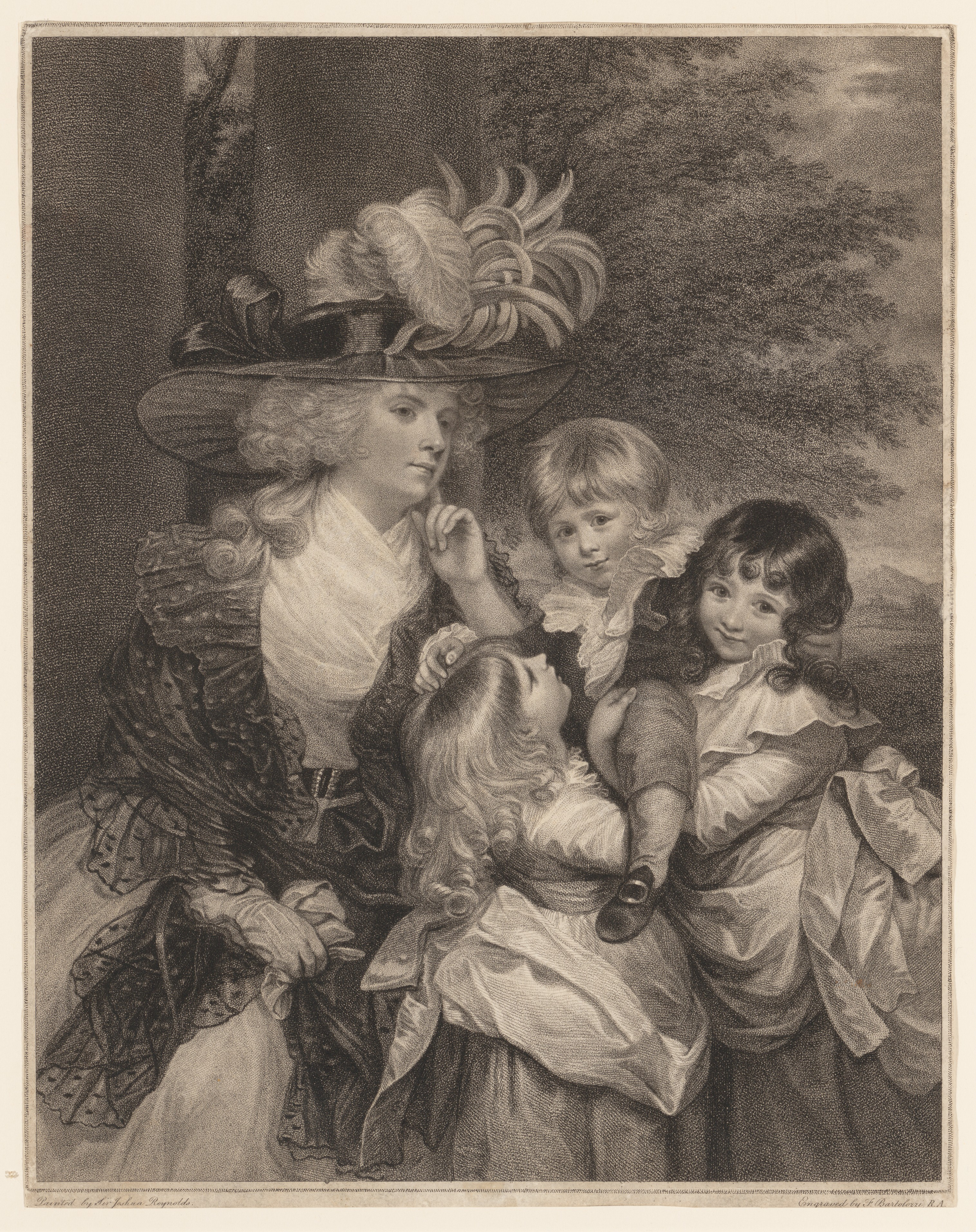

In 2023, it was proposed for Ladysmith to be renamed to uMnambithi. The name change officially took place in March 2024.

== History ==
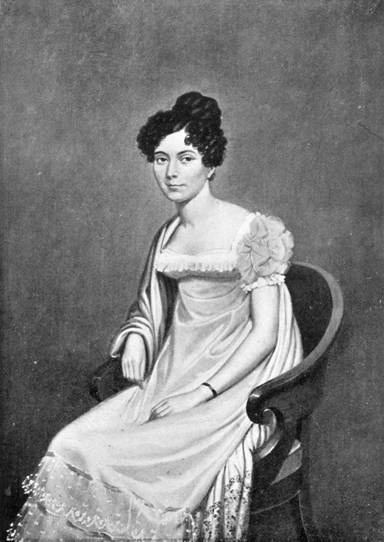
Juana María de los Dolores de León Smith

In 1847 a number of Boers created the Republic of Klip River in the area although the republic was annexed by the British in the same year. In June 1850 it was proclaimed a township called Windsor.

On 11 October 1850, the name was changed to Ladysmith after Juana María de los Dolores de León Smith, also known as "Lady Smith," the Spanish wife of Sir Harry Smith, the Governor of the Cape Colony and high commissioner in South Africa from 1847 to 1852. A fort was built in 1860 to protect the villagers from the Zulu.

=== The Second Boer War ===
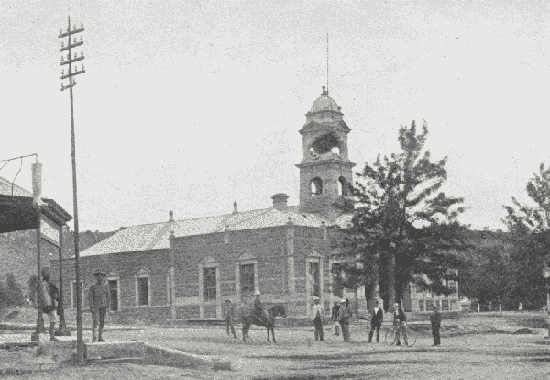
The town hall during the siege in 1900, with Boer artillery damage to the bell tower

During the Second Boer War, British Lieutenant-General Sir George White made Ladysmith his centre of operations for the protection of Natal against Boer forces. Starting on 29 October 1899, a number of short-lived battles were fought for control of the town, but after suffering heavy casualties British forces retreated to Ladysmith, though the Boers did not make use of this opportunity to follow up their successes and take control of the town. Following the battles, while British forces under White regrouped in the town, the Boers surrounded Ladysmith. The siege of Ladysmith lasted 118 days, from 2 November 1899 to 28 February 1900, during the most crucial stage of the war.

Three attempts by General Sir Redvers Buller to break the siege resulted in Boer victories at the battles of Colenso, Spion Kop and Vaal Krantz. On 6 January 1900, Boer forces under Commandant-General Piet Joubert attempted to end the siege by taking the town before the British could launch another attempt to break the siege. This led to the battle of Platrand (or Wagon Hill) south of the town. British forces under Buller finally broke the siege on 28 February 1900 after defeating the Boers by using close cooperation between his infantry and artillery. Winston Churchill, then a young war correspondent for The Morning Post of London, was present at the relief of Ladysmith after having been taken prisoner (between Ladysmith and Colenso) and escaping earlier during the war. Mohandas Gandhi, along with the stretcher-bearing corps that he had established earlier during the war, was involved in a number of actions that took place in and around Ladysmith during the relief.

== Geography ==
Ladysmith

Climate chart (precipitation, max. and min. temperature)
J	F	M	A	M	J	J	A	S	O	N	D
122 28 15	106 28 15	86 27 13	34 25 10	7 22 6	1 20 3	1 20 3	6 22 5	20 24 9	58 25 11	90 26 13	108 28 14
- █ Average max. and min. temperatures in °C
- █ Precipitation totals in mm
- Source: SA Explorer
Imperial conversion
J	F	M	A	M	J	J	A	S	O	N	D
4.8 82 59	4.2 82 59	3.4 81 55	1.3 77 50	0.3 72 43	0 68 37	0 68 37	0.2 72 41	0.8 75 48	2.3 77 52	3.5 79 55	4.3 82 57
- █ Average max. and min. temperatures in °F
- █ Precipitation totals in inches

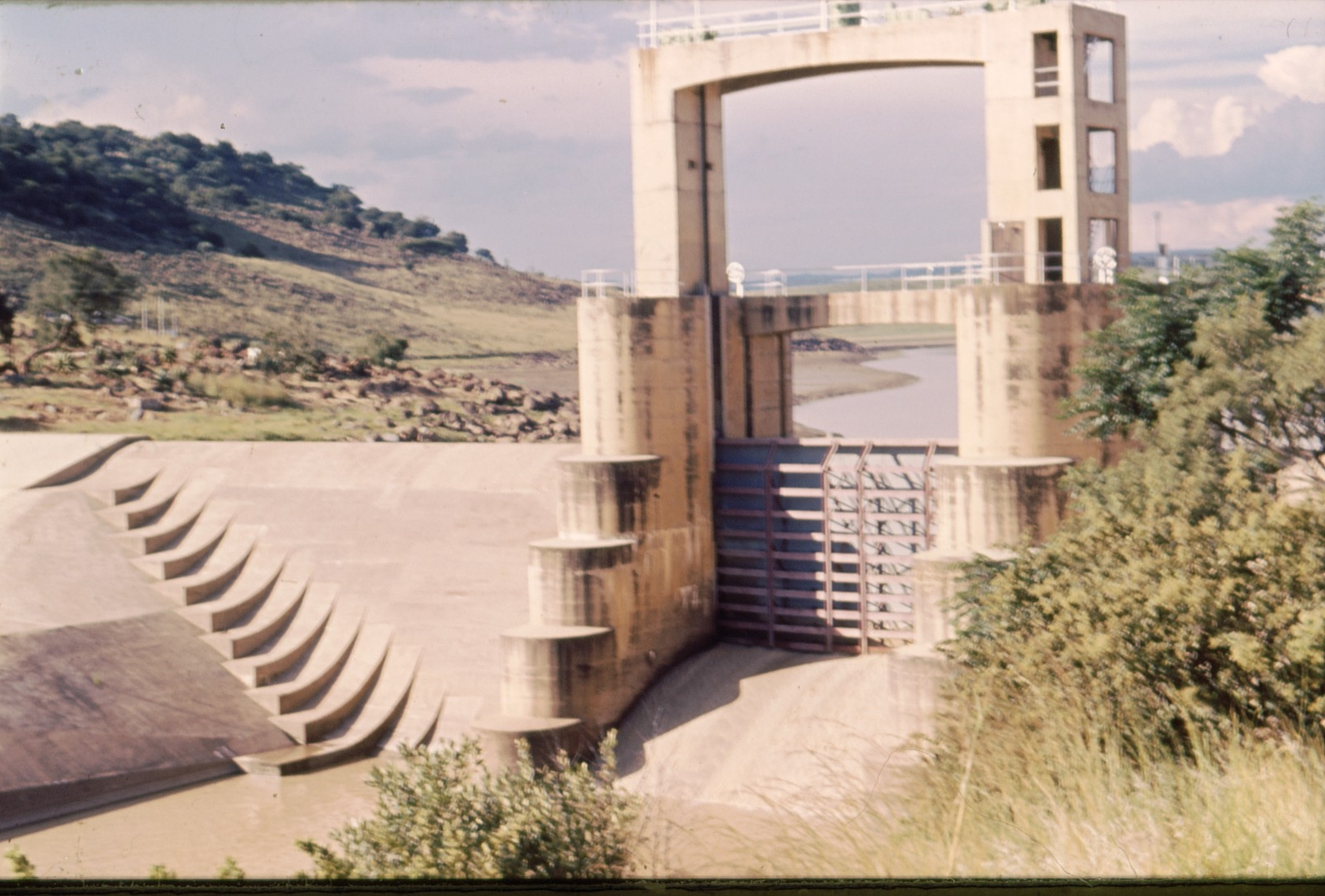
Windsor Dam

Ladysmith is located on the banks of the Klip River ("stone river"), with the central business district and a large part of the residential areas located within the flood basin of the river. It is on the foothills of the Drakensberg mountains, about 26 km from the Van Reenen's Pass. The town has a subtropical highland climate (Cwb, according to the Köppen climate classification), with warm summers and cool, dry winters. It borders on a humid subtropical climate (Cwa). The average annual precipitation is 639 mm (25 in), with most rainfall occurring during summer.

Since it was established the town has suffered severely from flooding of the Klip River. During the 110 years up to 1997 with the completion of the Qedusizi Dam, 29 serious floods occurred. Minor flooding occurred almost every year. The worst flooding in 30 years occurred in 1996 leading to R500 million in damages and the evacuation of 400 families. Efforts to control the flooding date back to the 1940s. In 1949 the Windsor Dam was completed, but this dam silted up very quickly and was not an effective means of flood control.

=== Climate ===
Climate data for Ladysmith (1981–2010)
Month	Jan	Feb	Mar	Apr	May	Jun	Jul	Aug	Sep	Oct	Nov	Dec	Year
Mean daily maximum °C (°F)	29.5 (85.1)	28.5 (83.3)	27.7 (81.9)	25.1 (77.2)	22.7 (72.9)	20.1 (68.2)	20.6 (69.1)	22.7 (72.9)	25.3 (77.5)	26.1 (79.0)	27.4 (81.3)	29.2 (84.6)	25.4 (77.7)
Mean daily minimum °C (°F)	16.8 (62.2)	16.4 (61.5)	15.0 (59.0)	10.9 (51.6)	6.4 (43.5)	2.0 (35.6)	2.5 (36.5)	6.0 (42.8)	10.0 (50.0)	12.3 (54.1)	14.4 (57.9)	16.0 (60.8)	10.7 (51.3)
Average rainfall mm (inches)	145 (5.7)	106 (4.2)	90 (3.5)	39 (1.5)	14 (0.6)	6 (0.2)	5 (0.2)	26 (1.0)	38 (1.5)	77 (3.0)	91 (3.6)	112 (4.4)	749 (29.4)
Average rainy days (≥ 0.1 mm)	14.4	11.8	11.3	6.1	2.9	1.4	1.4	3.2	4.8	9.7	12.5	14.1	93.6
Source: World Meteorological Organization

== Transport ==
=== Air ===
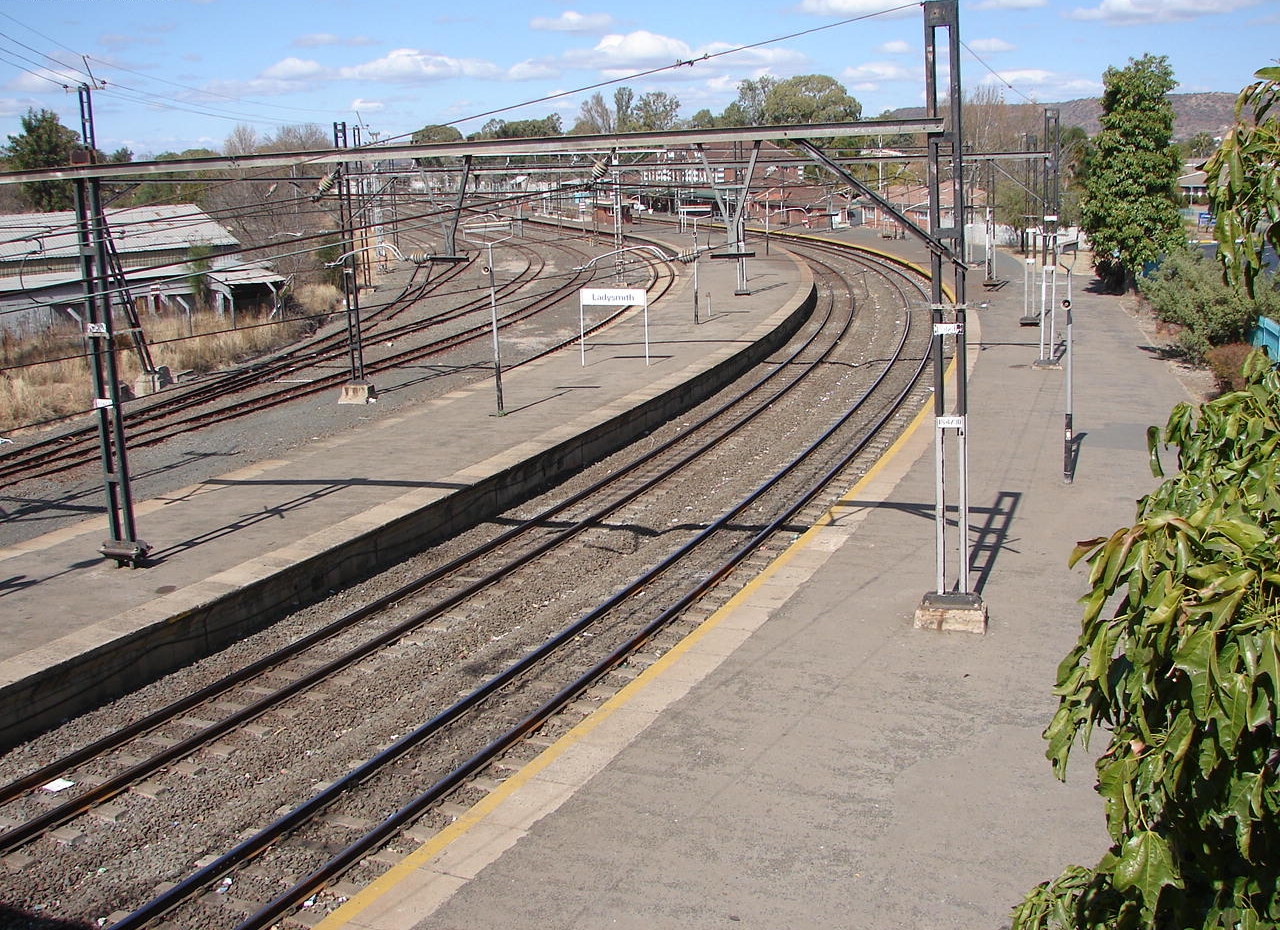
Ladysmith railway station

Ladysmith is served by a small airport, (IATA: LAY, ICAO: FALY) located on the western outskirts of the town just below Platrand at 28°34′48″S 29°45′10″E.

=== Rail ===
The Danskraal Yard is located on the Free State main line and the Glencoe–Vryheid line and acts as a depot for train marshalling and maintenance as well as rail maintenance. The passenger station is located some distance away from Danskraal close to the Central Business District.

=== Road ===
The N11 links Ladysmith with Newcastle in the north and with the N3 Freeway in the south-west, while the R103 provides access to Colenso in the south and the N3 Freeway in the west. Traffic traveling between Durban and Johannesburg used to pass through Ladysmith up until the late 1980s, but the completion of the N3 Toll Highway, bypassing Ladysmith 15 kilometres (9.3 mi) to the west, has caused a dramatic drop in traffic volumes through this town as well as others that are now bypassed. In that regard, the old main road through Ladysmith is now designated as the R103.

== Society and culture ==
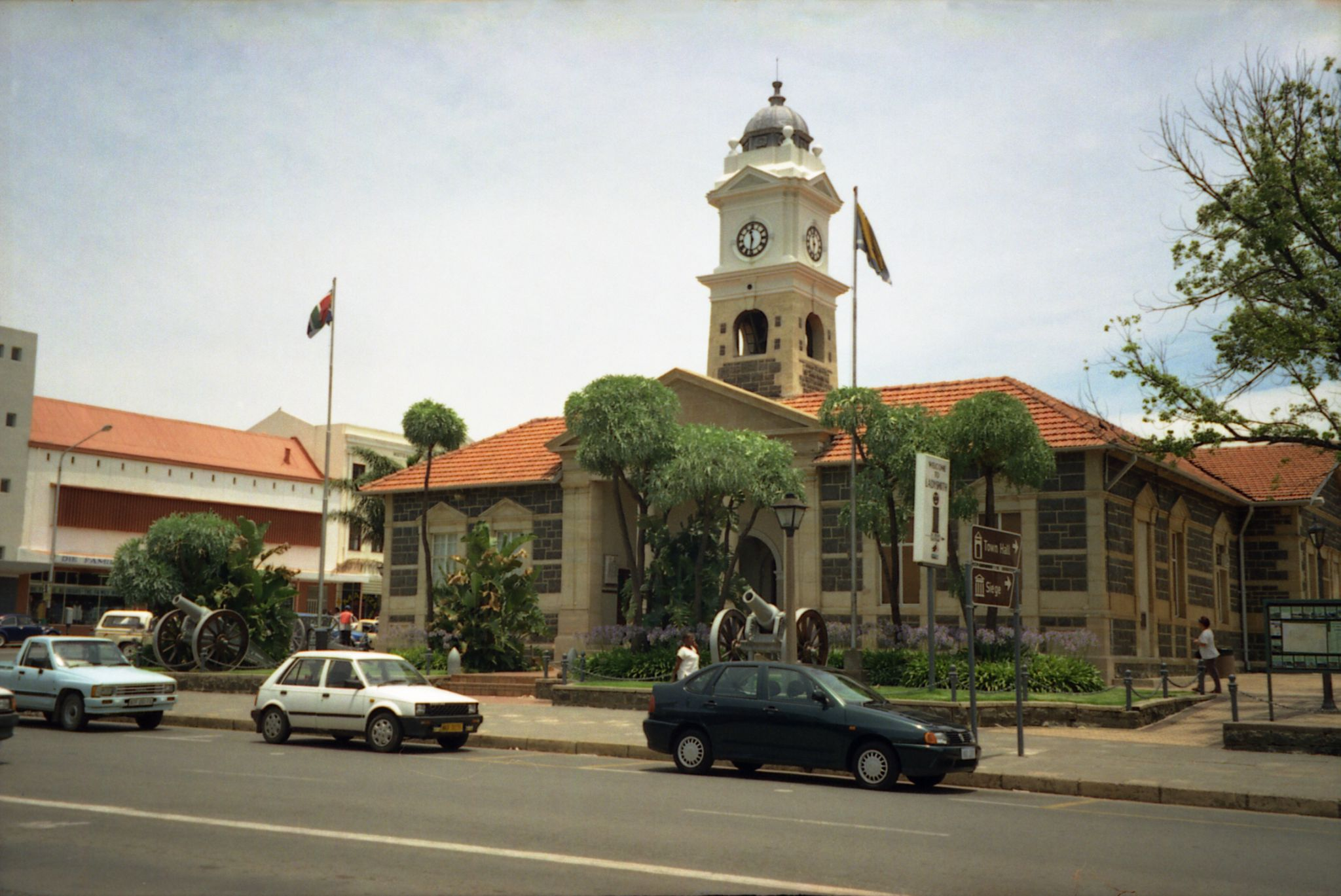
Castor and Pollux historical Howitzer cannons in front of the Town Hall, 2000.

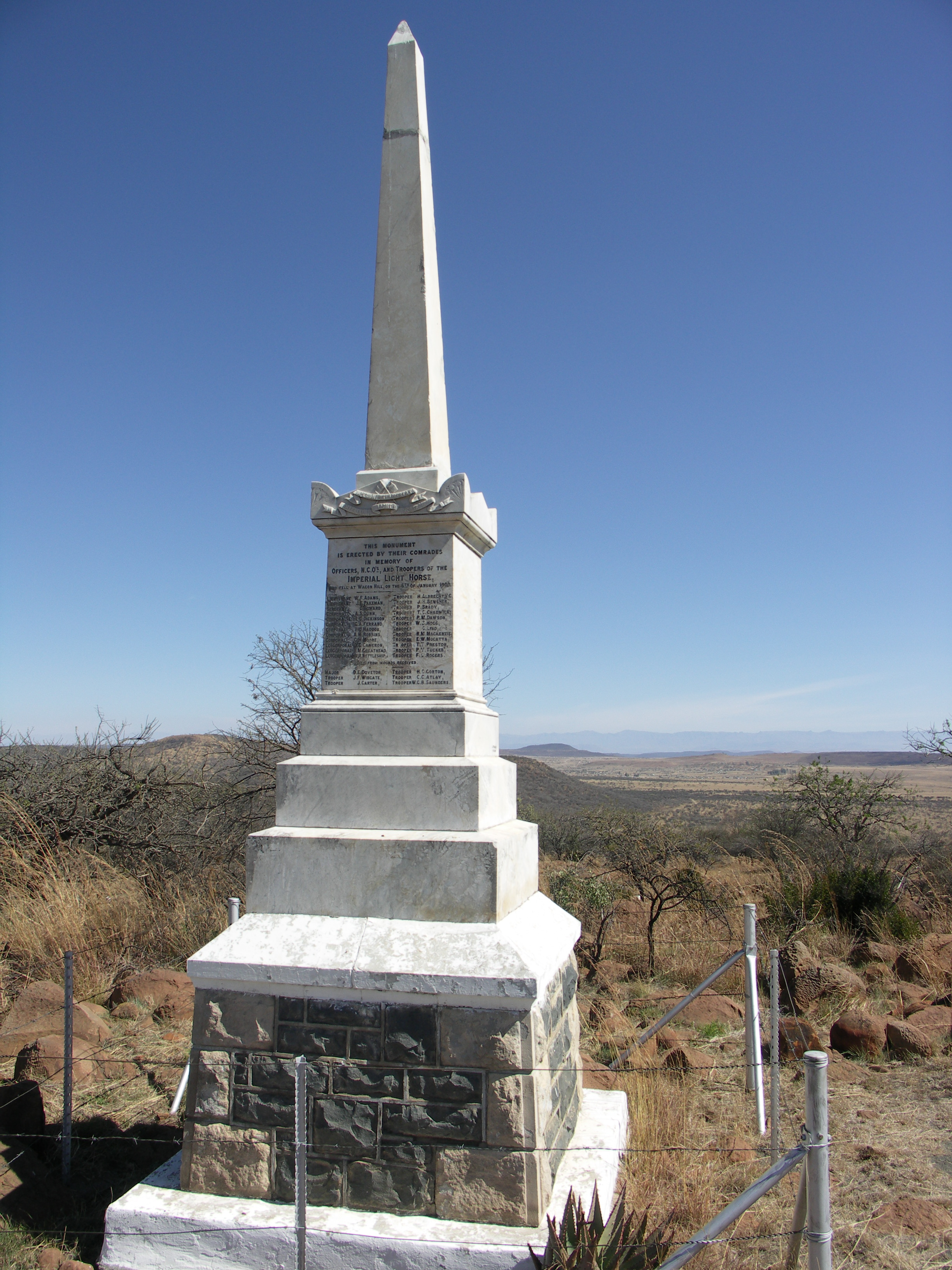
Imperial Light Horse Memorial on Wagon Hill for the officers, n.c.os and troops who died in battle on January 6, 1900. Photograph 2008.

The only sold local newspaper in Ladysmith is the Ladysmith Gazette. It is believed to have been established in 1902, and is part of the Caxton Group of newspapers. Two free local newspapers are the Ladysmith Herald and the Times of Ladysmith.. 5 South African Infantry Battalion is based in Ladysmith. A military shooting range is located on the outskirts of the town between the Aerodrome and Platrand.

Other buildings of interest are the Siege Museum, built in 1884 as a marketplace and opened as a museum in 1995. Detailing the battles and history at the time of the Siege, the museum holds around 60,000 documents related to the Siege and the Boer War. The Town Hall was damaged by Boer artillery during the Second Boer War. A large number of the Second Boer War Battlefields around Ladysmith have been preserved as memorial sites. Monuments and memorials to those who died during the battles have been erected at most of them. Two RML 6.3 inch Howitzers used by the British during the Siege stand in front of the Town Hall.

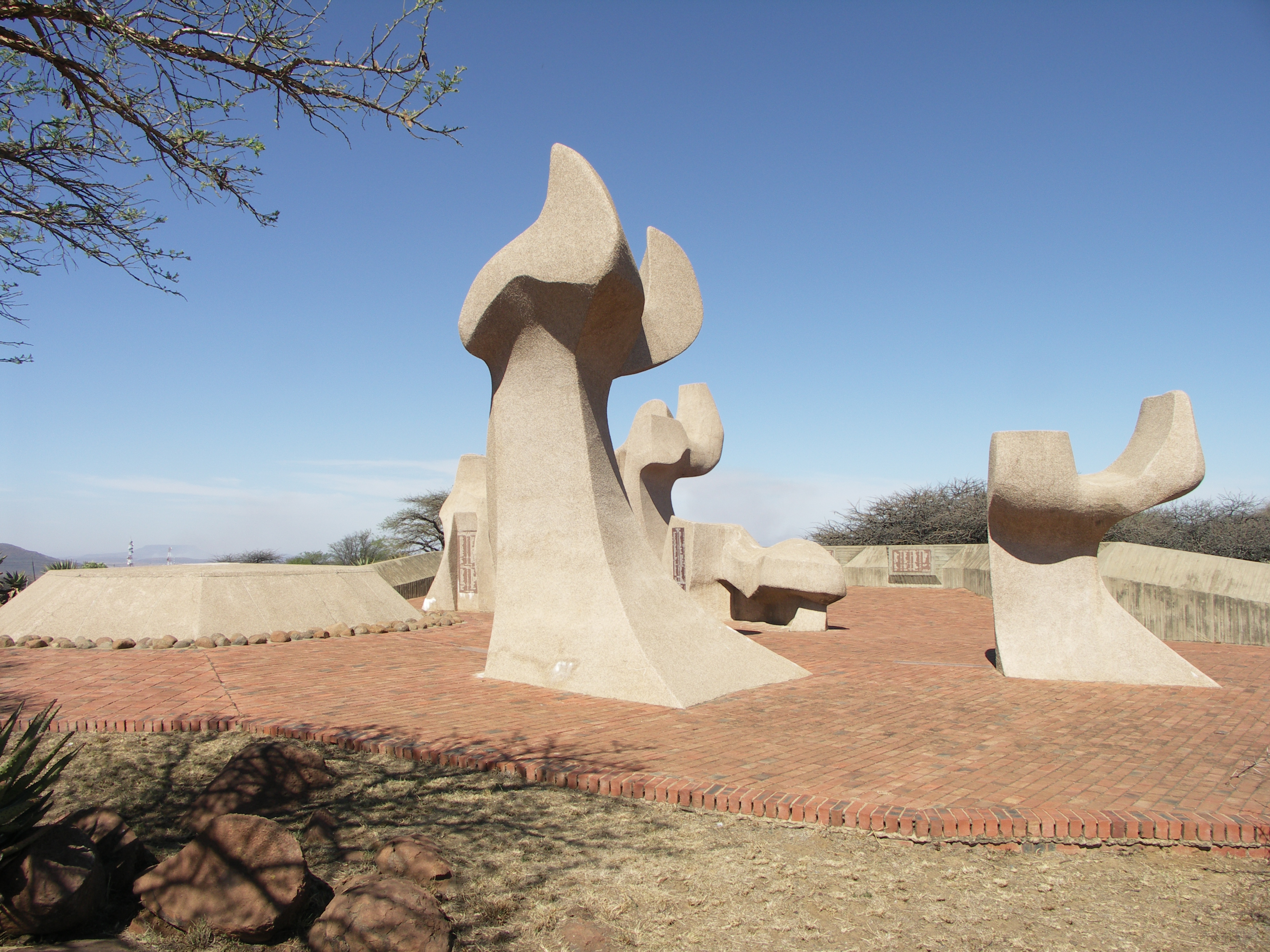
The Burgher Memorial on Wagon Hill at Platrand. Photo 2008.

Located just south of the town, the Platrand/Wagon Hill area saw action during the Relief of Ladysmith. The Burgher Memorial on Wagon Hill, a sculpture of six hands pointing upwards and one downwards, was erected in 1979 in honour of 781 Boer forces killed in the battles in Natal during the Second Boer War. A crypt at the center contains the remains of 310 re-interred burghers. On Platrand there are memorials to the Imperial Light Horse, the Devonshire Regiment, the Earl of Ava and a number of others.

Ladysmith is the hometown of Joseph Shabalala, founder of the group Ladysmith Black Mambazo. Thulani "Sugar Boy" Malinga, a champion boxer, was born in Ladysmith. Thamsanqa Gabuza, a soccer player, who plays for Orlando Pirates, was born in Ladysmith.

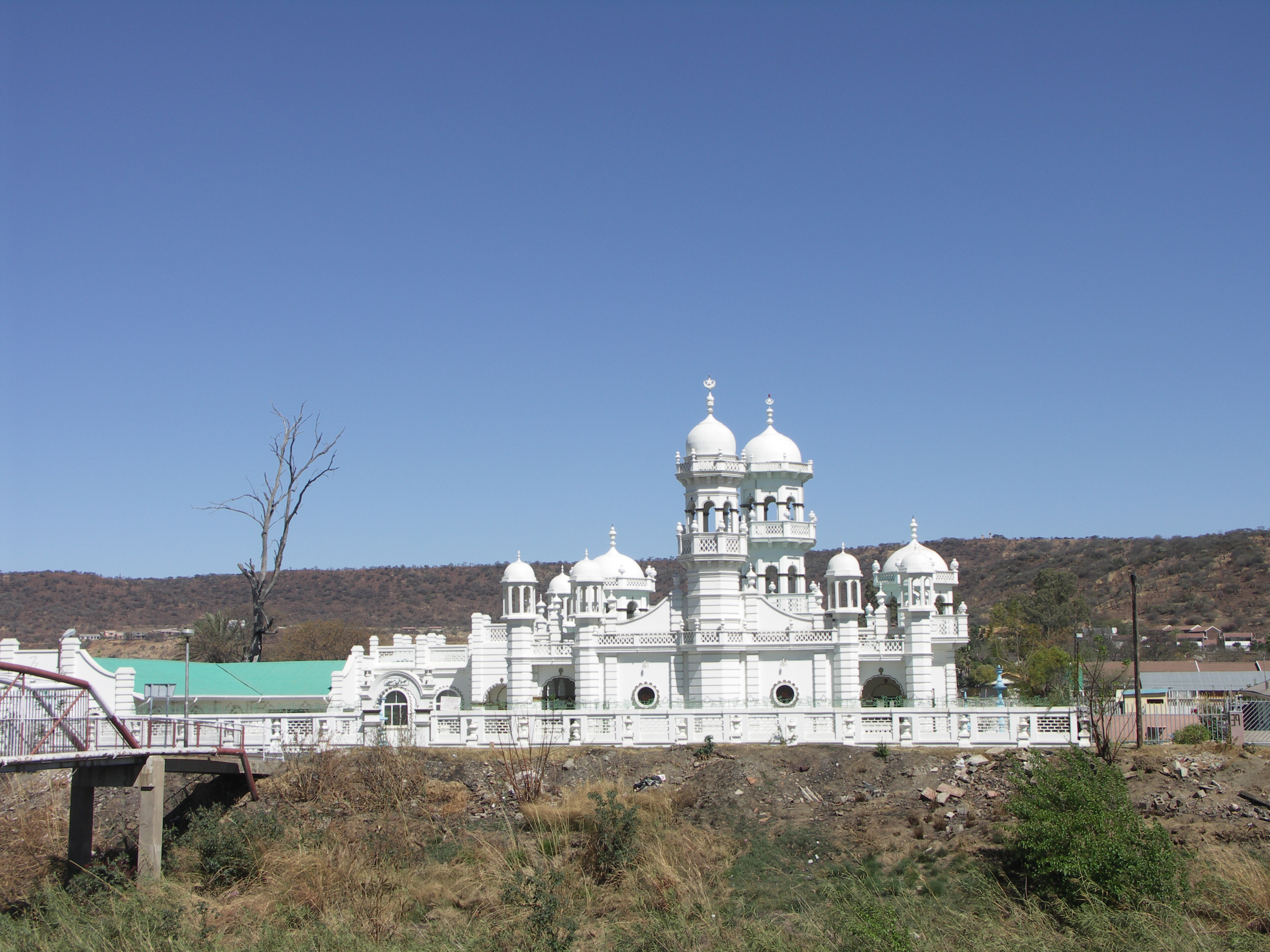
Soofi Mosque

Christianity has a strong presence in and around Ladysmith. It can be seen through the places of worship built around the time of the Anglo Boer wars. One such structure includes the Anglican All Saints Church, built in 1902 from cut flagstones from a quarry in the area. Islam also has a strong presence in the town, which is well known for the Soofie Mosque on the banks of the Klip River. Built in 1969, it is regarded as one of the finest in the country. The origins of the structure date back to 1895 when Hazrath Soofie Saheb arrived in South Africa. He made it his mission to build as many as 12 mosques along the east coast of Durban. Ladysmith was also the home of a revered saint known as Hazrath Soofie Sayed Mahomed Abed Mia Osmani, who is buried in the Ladysmith Muslim Cemetery.

For Hinduism, Sanathan Dharma Sabha was inaugurated to promote religious, social, cultural and education activities in Ladysmith in 1902. The oldest Hindu temple resulted from the amalgamation of Hindu Thirukootam (1910) with the Shree Ganaser Temple and hall erected in 1916. It was declared a national monument in November 1990. The present site of the SDS temple (Sanathan Dharma Sabha aka Lord Vishnu Temple) also housed Mahatma Gandhi who established a non-White Stretcher-bearer service in the Ambulance Corps in the Ladysmith and Spioenkop during the Anglo-Boer War.

There are also Rastafarian devotees within the areas surrounding Ladysmith, residing in Waters Meet, Peace Town, eZakheni, Steadville, Saint Chads, Acaciaville and Roosbom.

== Notable people ==
- Cecilia Tshabalala, women's rights activist and clubwoman
