= Uthukela District Municipality =

uThukela
- District municipality
- Seal

- Location in the KwaZulu-Natal
- Coordinates: 28°33′S 29°46′E
- Country: South Africa
- Province: KwaZulu-Natal
- Seat: Ladysmith
- Local municipalities: List: Emnambithi/Ladysmith; Indaka; Umtshezi; Okhahlamba; Imbabazane

Government
  - Type: Municipal council
  - Mayor: Dudu Mazibuko

Area
  - Total: 11,326 km^{2} (4,373 sq mi)

Population (2011)
  - Total: 668,848
  - Density: 59.054/km^{2} (152.95/sq mi)

Racial makeup (2011)
  - Black African: 95.1%
  - Coloured: 0.6%
  - Indian/Asian: 2.4%
  - White: 1.7%

First languages (2011)
  - Zulu: 90.5%
  - English: 4.7%
  - Afrikaans: 1.2%
  - Southern Ndebele: 1.1%
  - Other: 2.5%
- Time zone: UTC+2 (SAST)
- Municipal code: DC23

The uThukela District Municipality (Zulu: UMasipala wesiFunda sase uThukela) is one of the 11 districts of the KwaZulu-Natal province of South Africa. Its seat is Ladysmith. As of 2011, a majority of its 668,848 inhabitants spoke isiZulu. The district code is DC23.

== Geography ==
=== Neighbours ===
uThukela is surrounded by:

- Amajuba to the north (DC25)
- uMgungundlovu to the east (DC22)
- uMzinyathi to the south (DC24)
- the kingdom of Lesotho to the south-east
- Thabo Mofutsanyane in the Free State to the west (DC19)

=== Local municipalities ===
The district contains the following local municipalities:

Local municipality	Population	%	Dominant language
Emnambithi/Ladysmith (KZN232)	225 459	34.32%	Zulu
Indaka (KZN233)	113 643	17.30%	Zulu
Umtshezi (KZN234)	59 923	9.12%	Zulu
Okhahlamba (KZN235)	137 526	20.93%	Zulu
Imbabazane (KZN236)	119 922	18.25%	Zulu
Giants Castle Game Reserve	511	0.08%	

== Demographics ==
The following statistics are from the 2001 census.

=== Gender ===
Gender	Population	%
Female	355 161	54.06%
Male	301 825	45.94%

=== Age ===
Age	Population	%
000 - 004	79 502	12.10%
005 - 009	86 774	13.21%
010 - 014	88 382	13.45%
015 - 019	84 570	12.87%
020 - 024	58 816	8.95%
025 - 029	47 559	7.24%
030 - 034	38 476	5.86%
035 - 039	35 625	5.42%
040 - 044	30 466	4.64%
045 - 049	25 424	3.87%
050 - 054	21 699	3.30%
055 - 059	15 496	2.36%
060 - 064	14 379	2.19%
065 - 069	10 336	1.57%
070 - 074	8 896	1.35%
075 - 079	4 758	0.72%
080 - 084	3 964	0.60%
085 - 089	1 052	0.16%
090 - 094	477	0.07%
095 - 099	255	0.04%
100 plus	80	0.01%

== Politics ==
=== Election results ===
Election results for uThukela in the South African general election, 2004.

- Population 18 and over: 350 092 [53.29% of total population]
- Total votes: 177 230 [26.98% of total population]
- Voting % estimate: 50.62% votes as a % of population 18 and over

Party	Votes	%
Inkhata Freedom Party	87 332	49.28%
African National Congress	67 536	38.11%
Democratic Alliance	9 823	5.54%
African Christian Democratic Party	3 747	2.11%
New National Party	1 670	0.94%
Freedom Front Plus	1 170	0.66%
United Democratic Movement	1 123	0.63%
Minority Front	664	0.37%
Azanian People's Organisation	573	0.32%
Independent Democrats	546	0.31%
PJC	407	0.23%
Pan African Congress	400	0.23%
NA	309	0.17%
CDP	303	0.17%
UF	276	0.16%
United Christian Democratic Party	267	0.15%
SOPA	260	0.15%
KISS	246	0.14%
EMSA	242	0.14%
TOP	207	0.12%
NLP	129	0.07%
Total	177 230	100.00%
