= Inkanyamba =

Mythological serpent

Origin
- Country: South Africa
- Region: Howick Falls
- Details: Found in water

The Inkanyamba (Xhosa pronunciation: [,inkan'ja:mba]) is a legendary creature in South African Folklore.

== Etymology ==
The name inkanyamba in Xhosa is literally 'snake cloud' (Note: Roberts & Sampson (1996) apud Alcock (2010), p. 293) or 'snake in the sky', referring to the 'tornado'. (Note: Wood (2000), p. 82, abstracted in African Studies Abstracts: The Abstracts Journal of the African Studies Centre, Leiden 333: 169 (2002).) The sense is not merely the physical weather phenomenon, but encompasses the tornado spirit.

== Localization ==
The lore of the inkanyamba is localized around several bodies of water, including the Umgeni River and Umkomazi River systems, in KwaZulu-Natal Province of South Africa. It is especially said to dwell in the pool of Howick Falls (on the Umgeni River), thus known locally by the nickname "Howie". It is also said to haunt various dams around Dargle, a settlement along the Umgeni River system. The lore is also collected around Hogsback in Eastern Cape Province.

== Description ==
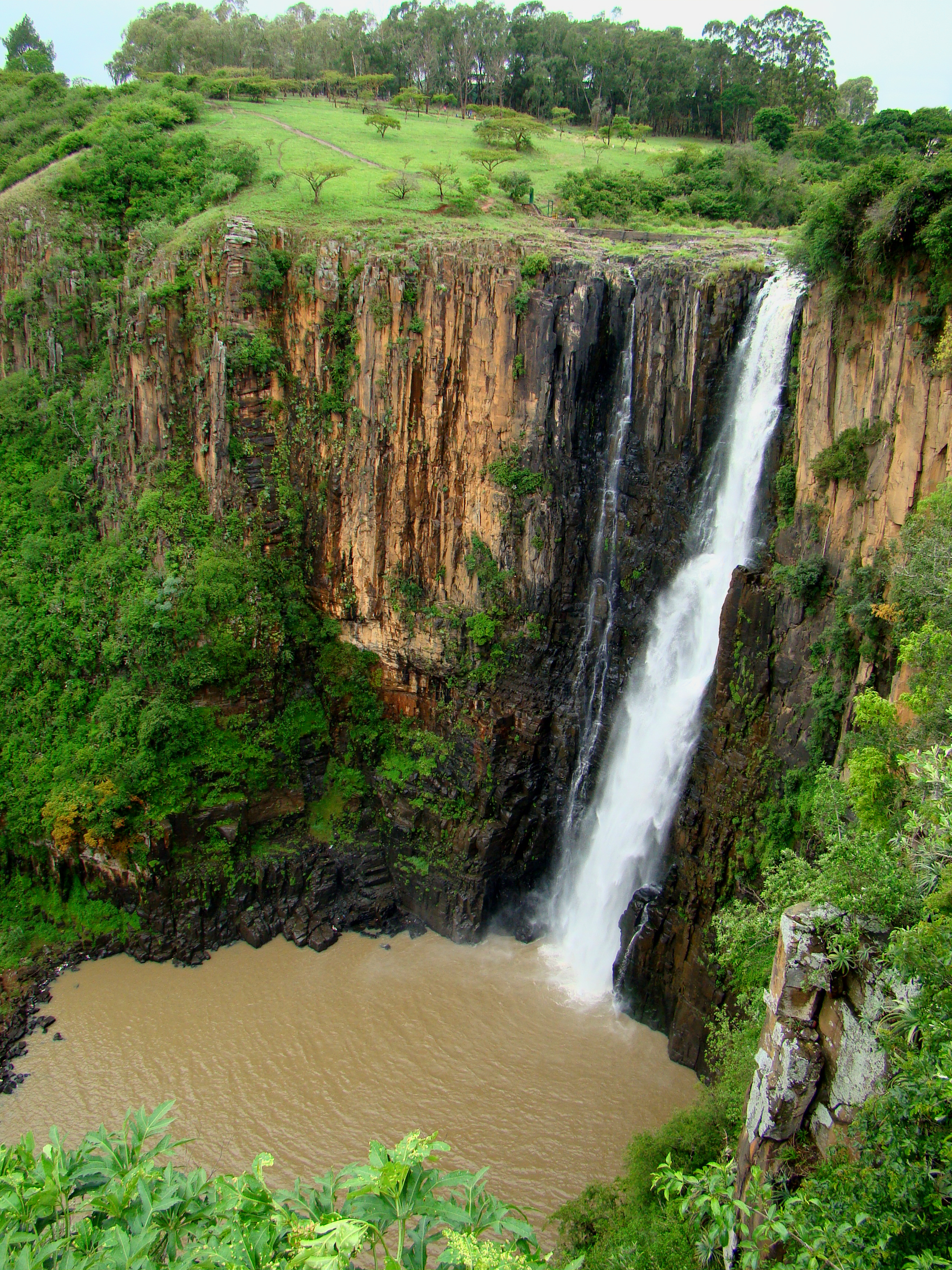
Howick Falls

Inkanyamba is described to be a huge serpent or serpentine dragon whose coiling body extends from heaven to earth; it is the root cause of tornados, a goddess of storm, water, and hail in Zulu belief. It is not necessarily regarded as a single female deity, for a number of tales blame disaster on a male inkanyamba seeking a female partner or mate. (Note: Wood (2000), p. 83 also cited by Kosgei) (Note: In a modern variant, inkanyamba occasionally flies from Howick Falls to see its partner at the Midmar Dam (the dam is also near Pietermaritzburg, the provincial capital).)

Descriptions of the inkanyamba vary. A common interpretation depicts the cryptid as a serpentine creature with a horse-like or dragon-like head. Some local reports describe the creature as a gargantuan creature with a row of dorsal fins running down its whole spine, and sometimes bat-like or dolphin-shaped wings and horns as appendages. Furthermore, various reports describe the inkanyamba as a serpentine reptile with a snake-like head and a mane of flesh. The inkanyamba of Howick Falls is a seven-headed creature according to Zulu folklore. (Note: Kosgei compares the seven-headed nondo of the Kenyan coast to the inkanyamba.) (Note: Nyameka Tshungulwana (of Mpondo, in the valley below Hogsback) was also taught that inkanyamba was a multiple-headed snake, and herself perceived of a 1996 hurricane as a snake.) According to a Zulu informant, (Note: Zola Sikiti, after his grandmother.) the inkanyamba was a "two-headed snake" that preyed especially on women, lurking in the deep pools of rivers (Zulu: isiziba). (Note: Wood (2000), p. 82 also cited by Kosgei)

There were many anecdotes collected on inkanyamba connected with tornado incidents in Hogsback, South Africa in 1998, and local artisans created clay figurines depicting the inkanyamba as monsters, often of dragon shape, with horse or hog-like heads and wings, sometimes with horns, fangs, or even tentacles. Artists may be inclined to resort to adopting dragon form, which is more stable with its four feet, over a coiling serpent aloft in air, for "technical reasons", but pragmatism may not be the only reason. The folklore of Hogsback speaks of one type of inkanyamba, with a head like a cow's, with long extending horns, and a dragon's body, giving it an overall diabolical appearance. Some speak of creature with a bird-like shape. The inkanyamba having a fish-like tail is a common factor.

Zulu people believe that coming in contact with the Inkanymba is dangerous, as it is suspected by some of being a swift, carnivorous eel which snatches people and animals from the shoreline in the blink of an eye.

== Lore on its habits ==
Most active in the summer months, it is believed that the inkanyamba's anger causes the seasonal storms. However, it's also believed that appeasing the Inkanyamba calms its anger and brings forth rain and fertility.

People who have shiny corrugated metal roofs (Note: Wood gives "unpainted zinc roofs" and Sandberg gives corrugated "iron" roofs, but these are presumably the same, i.e., corrugated galvanised iron roofs.) can attract a inkanyamba; when it feels it has been tricked into visiting a sham pool of water, the people incur its wrath, and it sending out gusts of wind and hail, causing all sorts of destruction, uprooting trees, ruining crops, and stripping homes of rooftops.

== Appearances ==
Some commentators advocate the idea of mistaken identity by those who actually sighted only a crocodile or a giant eel. In 1962, a game ranger, Buthelezi, claimed to see a horse-headed animal with a serpentine body basking on a sandbank in the Umgeni River, suspecting it to be the Inkanyamba. (Note: Witnessed 1962 by game warden named Buthelezi.) Several other sightings were reported by locals in 1974, 1981 and 1995, but these are suspected to be a nile crocodile, eels or a hoax to promote tourism.

== In popular culture ==
Inkanyamba was featured in the 4th season of the Canadian documentary series Mystery Hunters.

== See also ==
- Ayida Wedo – Type of African Rainbow snake/serpent; cf. pottery depictions
- Lake monster – Lake-dwelling creature in myth and folklore
- Mami Wata – African water spirit
- Mamlambo – South African deity
