= Apartheid Museum =

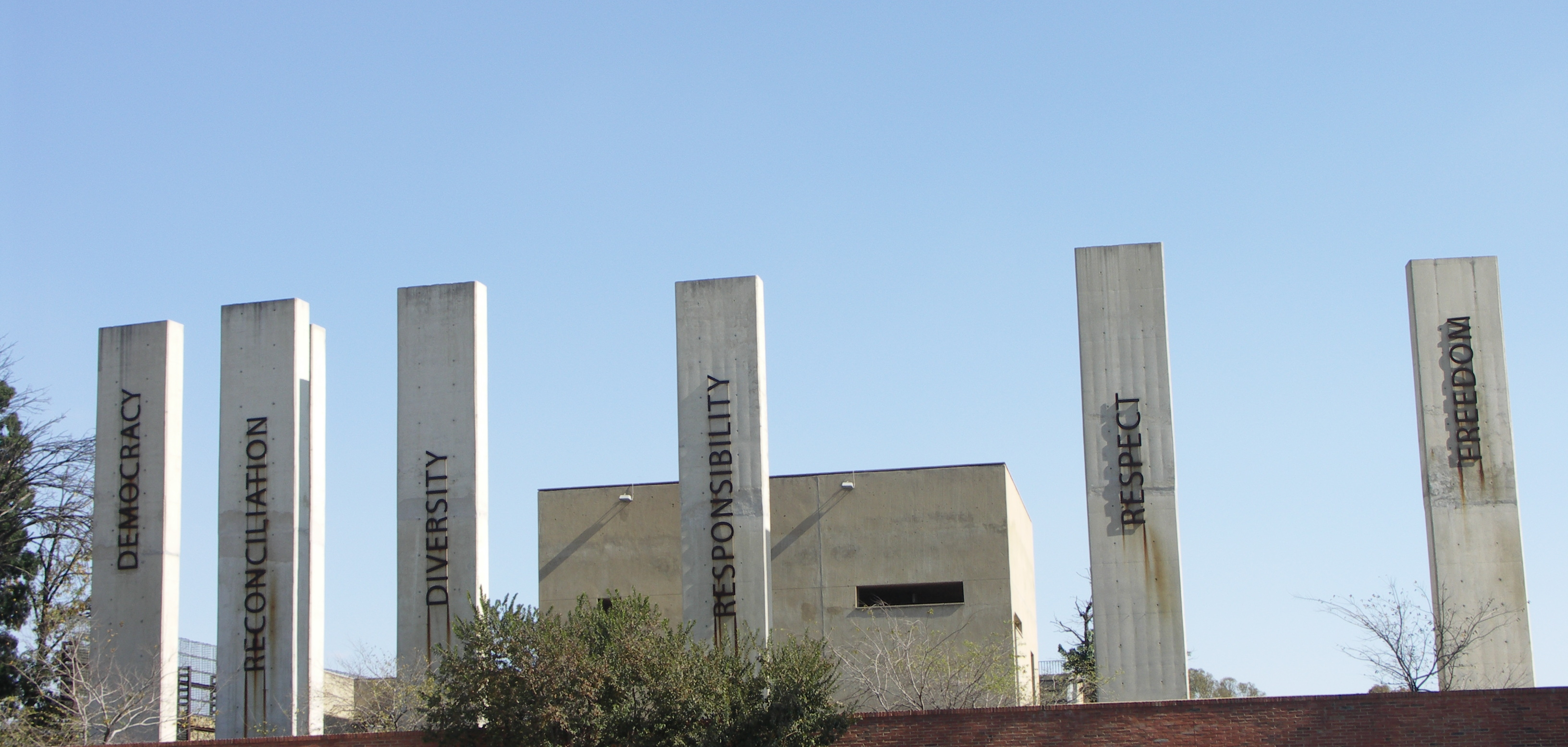
- Pillars of the Constitution
- Established: November 2001; 24 years ago
- Location: Johannesburg, South Africa
- Coordinates: 26.2376°S 28.0090°E
- Type: Specialised museum on Apartheid
- Website: www.apartheidmuseum.org

The Apartheid Museum is a museum illustrating apartheid and the 20th-century history of South Africa. The museum, part of the Gold Reef City complex located in the south of Johannesburg, was opened in November 2001. It was established by an independent non-profit organisation, Akani Egoli, and built as an offshoot of the development of the Gold Reef City Casino.

At least five times a year, events are held at the museum to celebrate the end of apartheid and the start of multiracial democracy for the people of South Africa.

On entry, visitors are randomly classified as either "white" or "non-white", and are directed "to enter the museum through the designated entrance".

== Exhibits ==
The Pillars of the Constitution is the first exhibit visitors see when visiting the Apartheid Museum. Located in the courtyard, it includes one pillar for each of the seven values that are enshrined in the South African Constitution: Democracy, Equality, Reconciliation, Diversity, Responsibility, Respect and Freedom.

Race Classification is both an entry point and exhibit. Apartheid was built on divisions by race: native, white, coloured, and Asian. Required identity documents indicated one's race, and these are on view in this exhibit. Visitors to the museum have just entered at this point, using one of two entrances, white and non-white, based on randomly generated entrance tickets. The actual items one sees in the exhibit is determined by which entry point one has had to use.

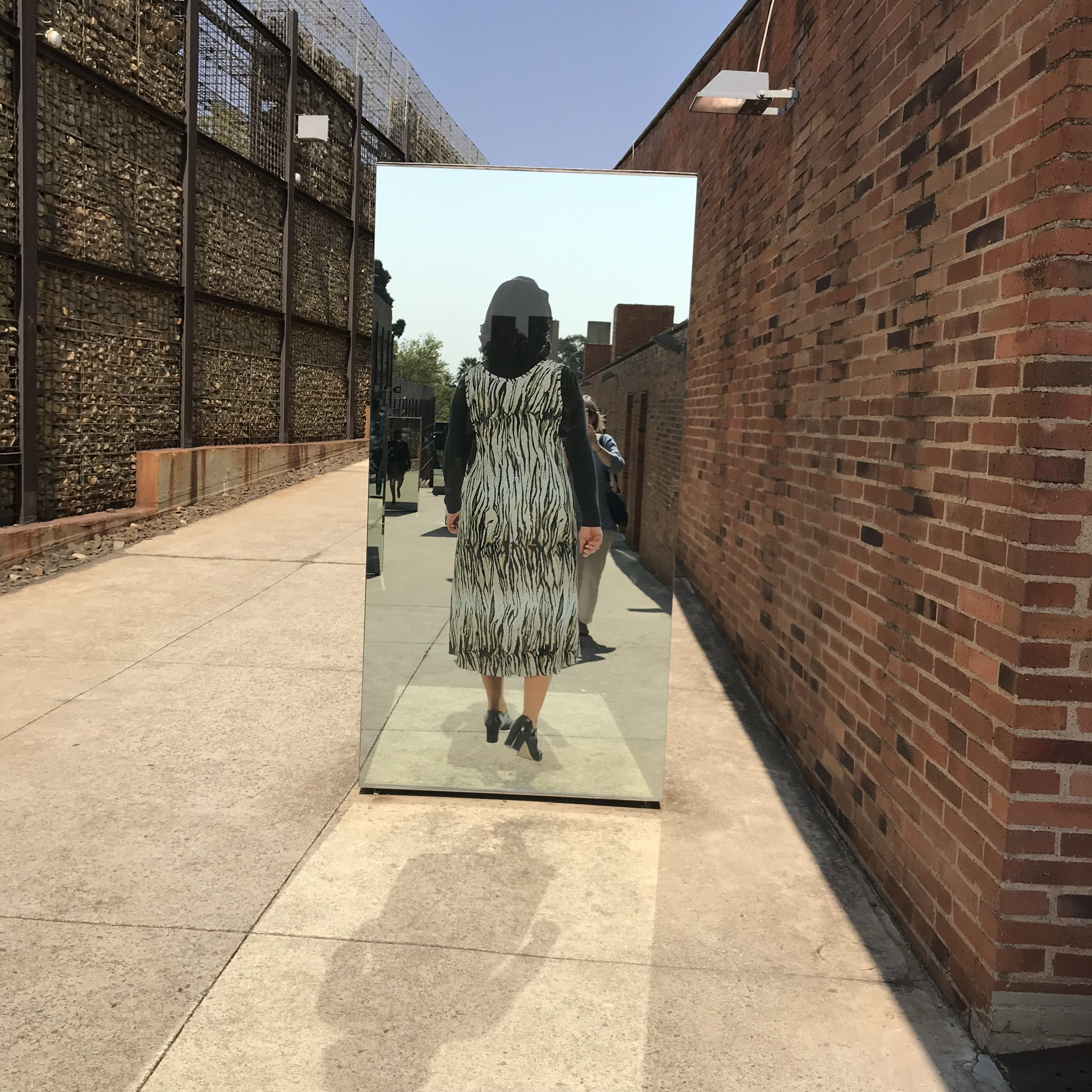
Johannesburg immigrant's descendant from the Journey Exhibit at the Apartheid Museum.

The next exhibit, which is outside on the way to the museum building, is Journeys. It includes large photos of the descendants of individuals who came to Johannesburg in the aftermath of the discovery of gold in 1886. There was a wide racial diversity amongst these individuals. Apartheid was designed to segregate individuals from different races. When walking through this exhibit, one encounters the backs of these individuals, as if they are walking in the same direction as the visitor is heading. By turning back once one has passed a photograph, it is possible to see the person from the front.

The Segregation exhibit provides background on the official policy of segregation that became a feature of the Union of South Africa, which was formed in 1910. Blacks and white women were not allowed to vote under this policy. Segregation laid the way for apartheid.

== Gallery ==
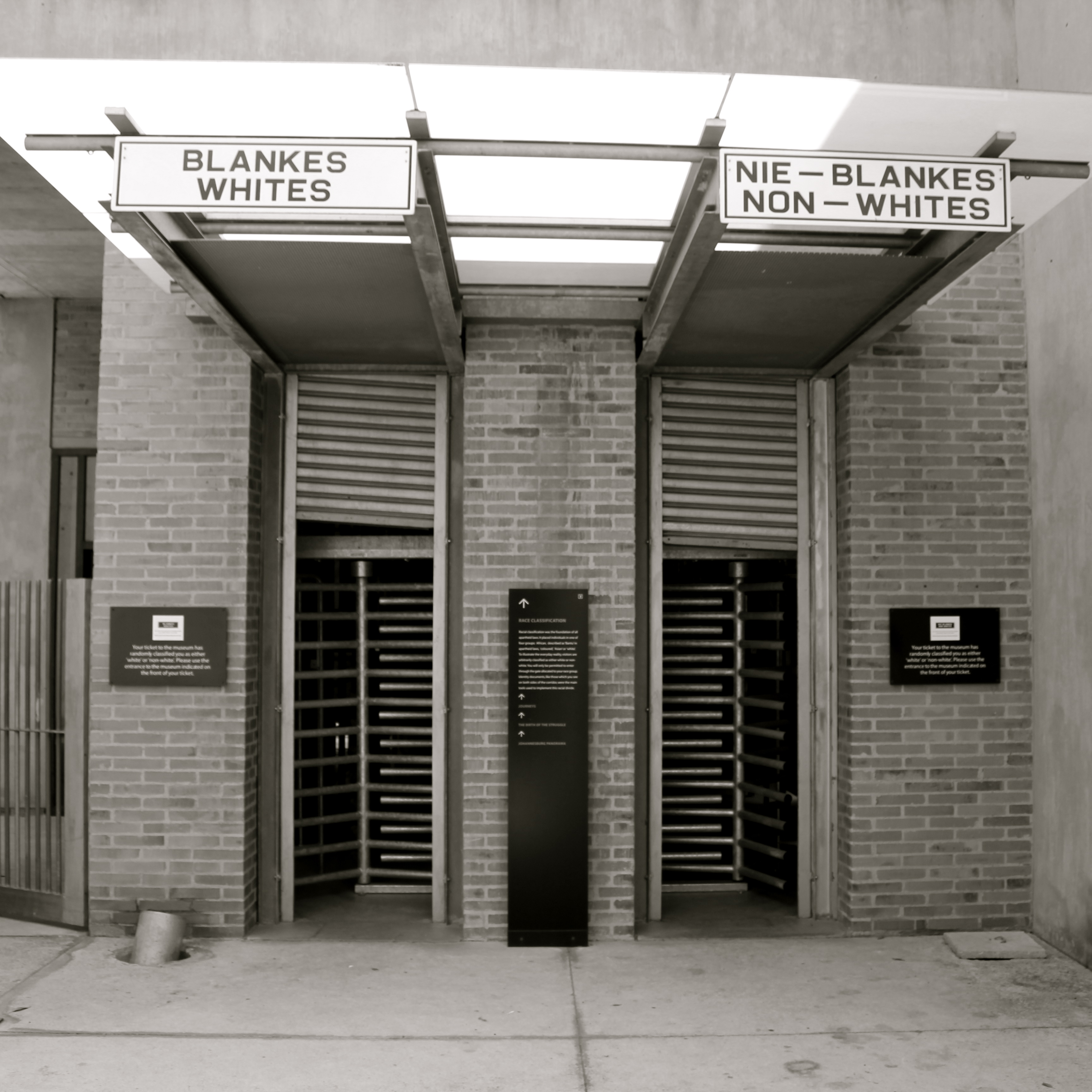
The racially-segregated entrance to the museum

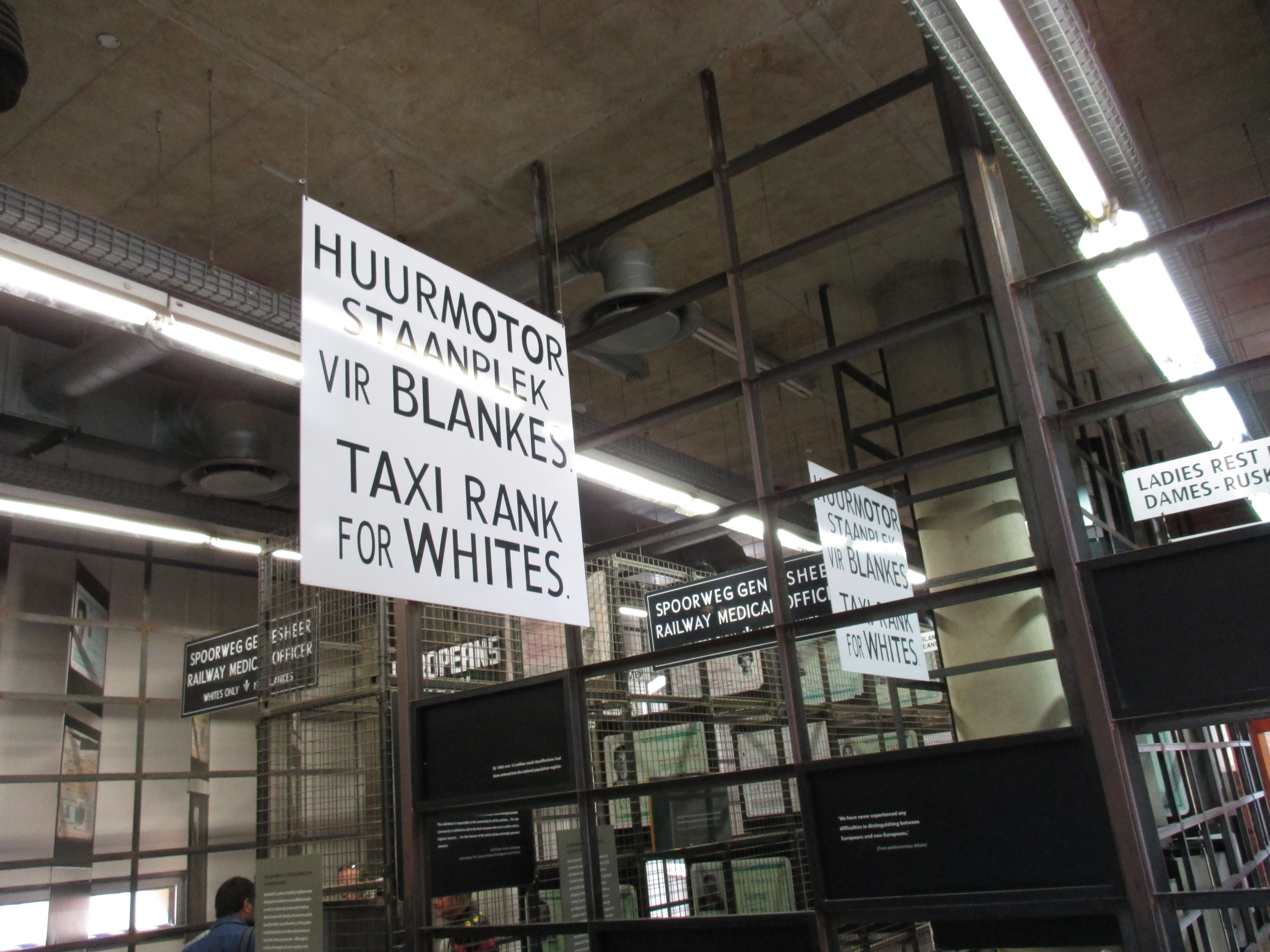
Taxi rank sign in entrance hall

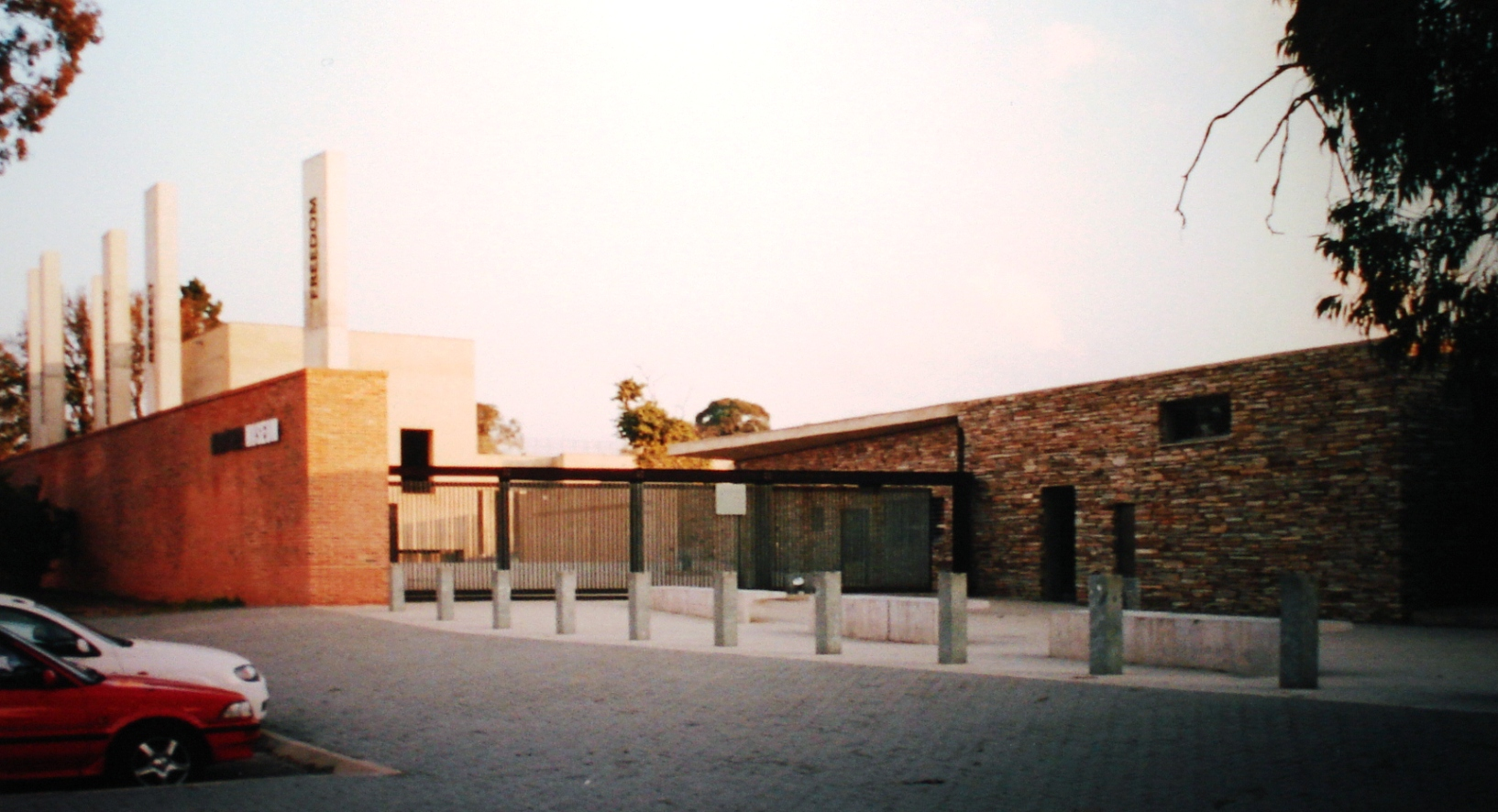
The Apartheid Museum, 2005

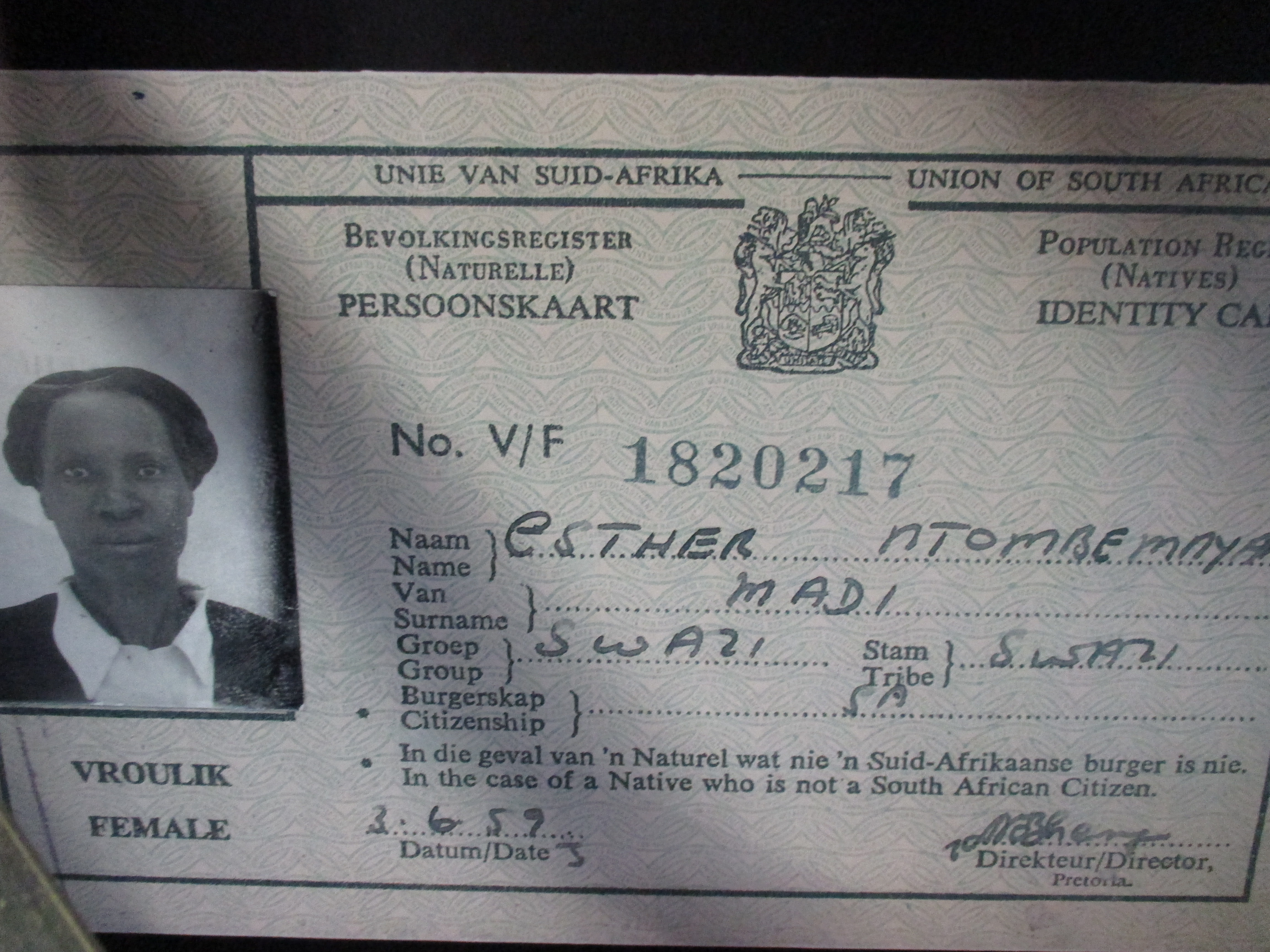
Expired South African identity card

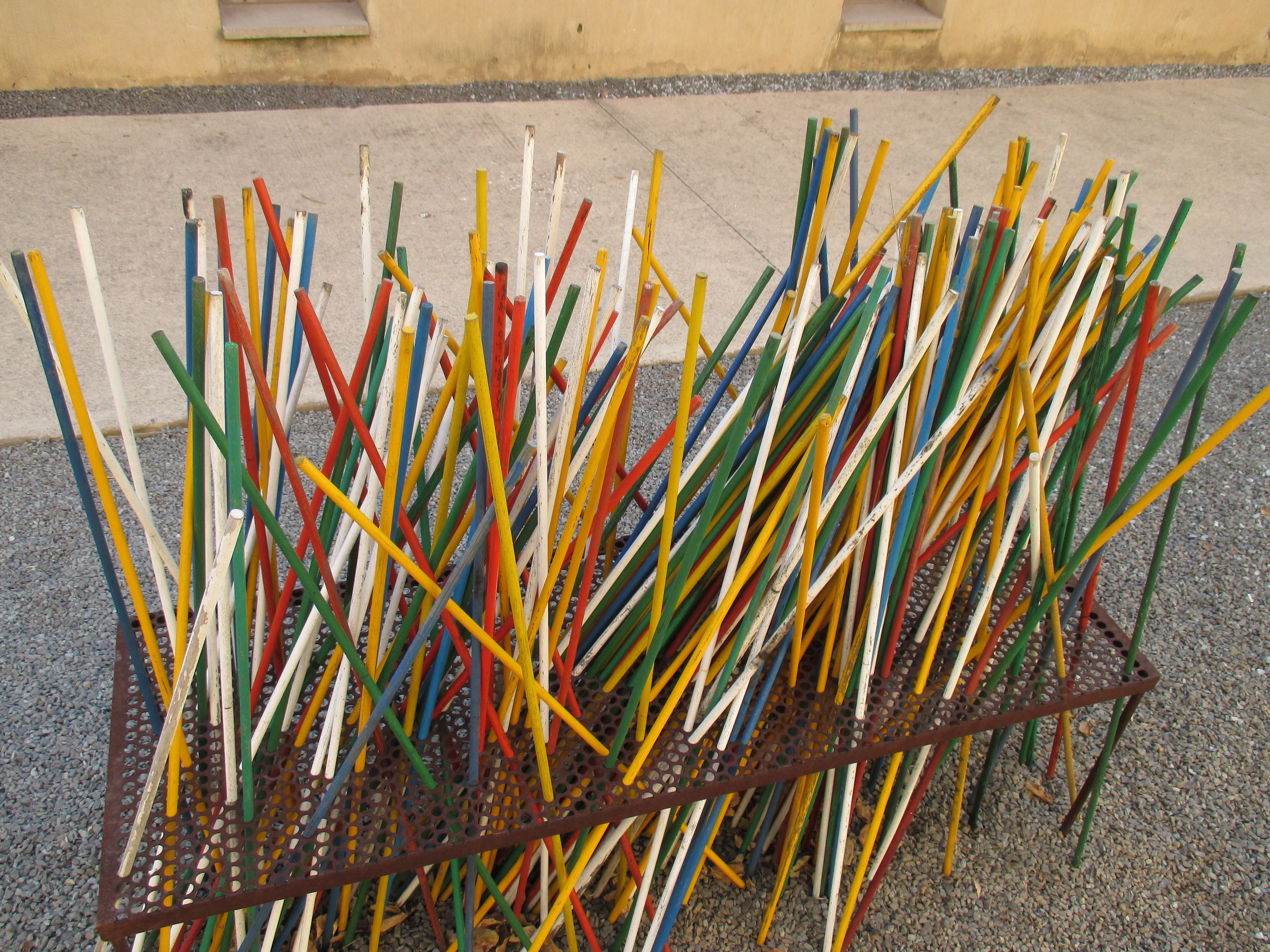
Sculpture at the Apartheid Museum

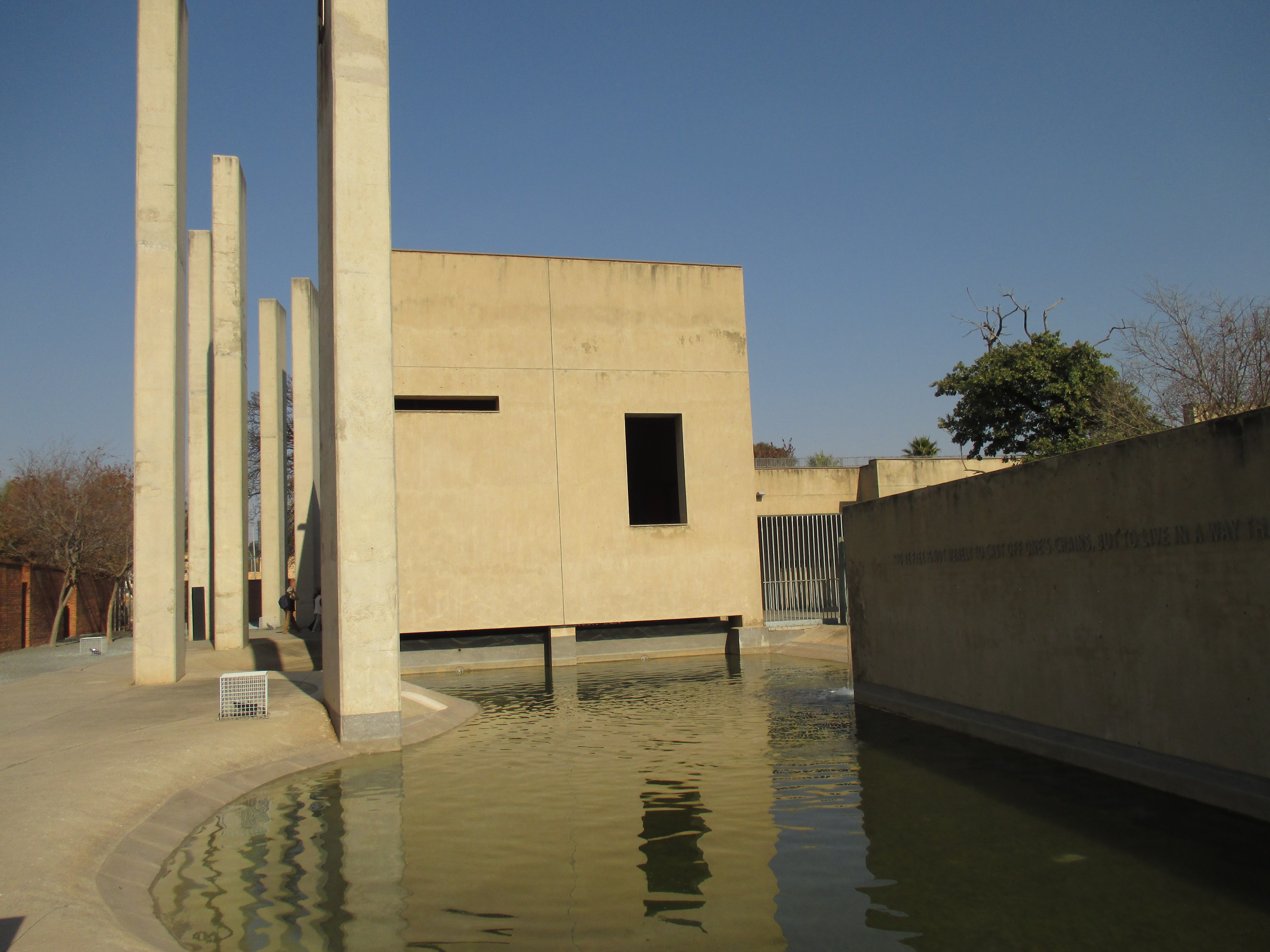
The pool of reflection

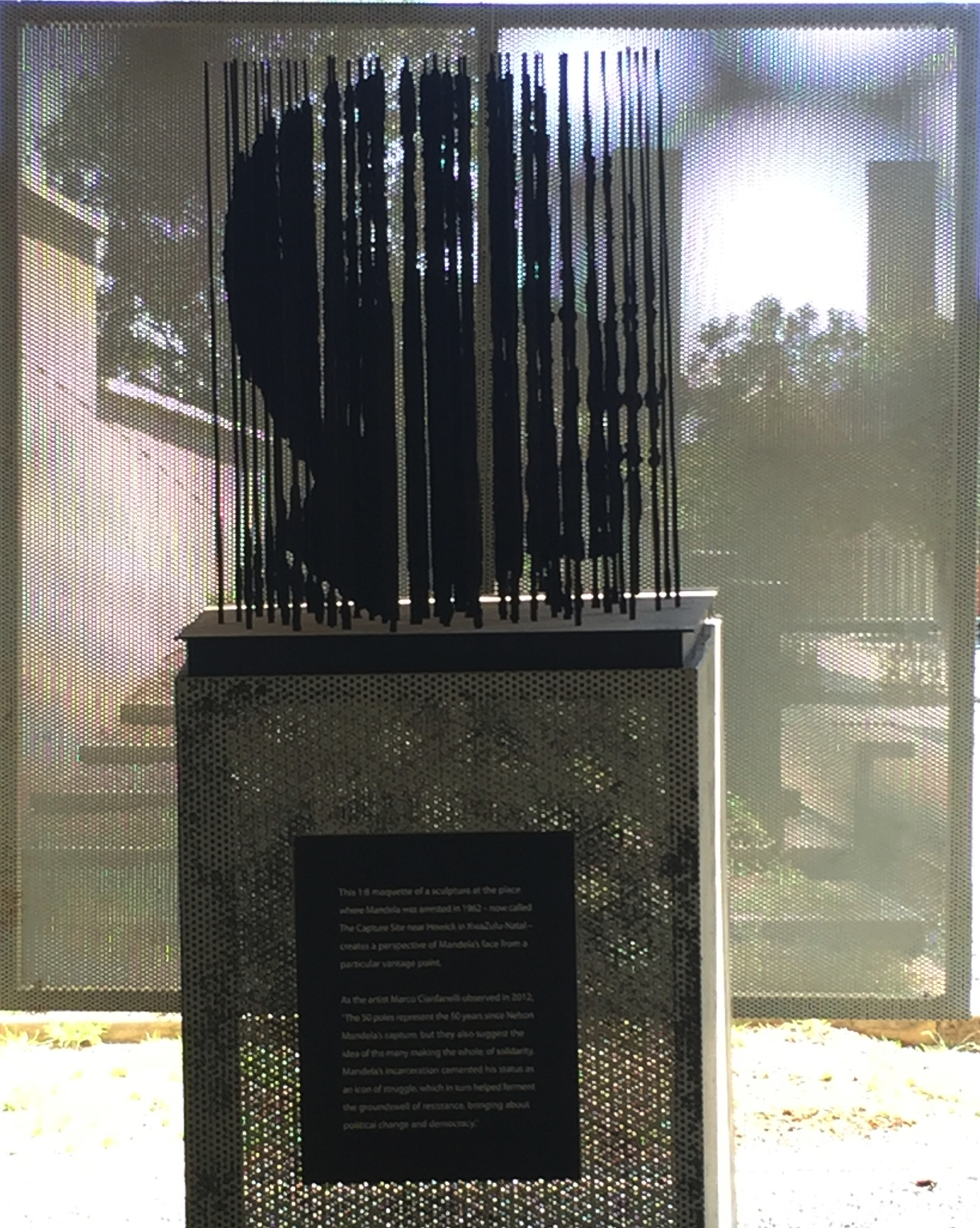
Replica of Nelson Mandela Artwork at Apartheid Museum by Marco Cianfanelli
