= Cianfanelli =

Cianfanelli is an Italian surname. Notable people with the surname include:

- Marco Cianfanelli (born 1970), South African artist
- Nicola Cianfanelli (1793–1848), Italian painter and restorer
