= Gabisile Nkosi =

South African artist (1974–2008)

- Born: 4 February 1974; Umlazi, Durban, South Africa
- Died: 27 May 2008 (aged 34); Lidgetton, KwaZulu-Natal, South Africa
- Education: Ogwini High School
- Alma mater: Durban University of Technology
- Known for: printmaking, women's rights activism, HIV/AIDs activism
- Children: 1

Gabisile Nkosi (4 February 1974 – 27 May 2008) was a South African artist and printmaker, community organiser and women's rights activist.

== Early life and education ==
Nkosi was born in 1974 in Umlazi, Durban, South Africa, as the fifth of seven children. She was a devout Christian.

She attended Ogwini High School in Umlazi, while attending Velobala Art Classes at the African Art Centre on Saturdays. After graduating from school, she applied to study at the Durban University of Technology and her application was rejected in 1995, 1996 and 1997 due to her "poor English" and "lack of portfolio". She was finally accepted and enrolled to study Fine Art at the university, where she was the only black student in her class. She was mentored during university by Jan Jordaan.

Nkosi also trained in printmaking under Malcolm Christian during an International Residential Fellowship at the Caversham Press, Natal. She later worked at Caversham Press as their programme manager and local community co-ordinator.

== Career ==
Nkosi's work explored her identity as a black South African women, daughter and mother. She was also interested in how art could be used as therapy and healing, especially for women who had been abused through domestic violence, after experiencing an attack in 1998 where the father of her child stabbed them both.

In 2000, she contributed the linocut Break the Silence to the HIV/AIDS Billboard and Portfolio Project, which was sponsored by Artists for Human Rights. Her piece was displayed at the main entrance and exit to Umlazi. It depicted a young black female nurse with a box of condoms teaching Zulu male elders (induna's) about safe sex. The image was controversial as it challenged the cultural beliefs that it was immoral for young women to education elder men whilst also broaching the taboo around HIV/AIDs. Nkosi was interviewed on Zulu radio about her work, advocating for herself and people living with AIDs. The linocut is now held in the collection of the Museum of Modern Art (MoMA), Manhattan, New York.

In 2003, Nkosi was artist in residence at the McColl Center, Charlotte, North Carolina, who stated that "her expressive and haunting prints and paintings form a powerful narrative about apartheid and domestic life and community in her native South Africa that resonate across physical and cultural borders."

In 2007, Nkosi was selected to run a creativity workshop at the Oprah Winfrey Leadership Academy for Girls in Johannesburg. She was also invited to exhibit in England as part of the celebrations commemorating the 200th university of the abolition of slavery.

Ukwelapha: Healing, her last exhibition, was mounted at the African Art Centre in 2007.

== Death ==
Nkosi was murdered on 27 May 2008 in her home at Lidgetton, KwaZulu-Natal, by her estranged partner.

Her son Sandile was 13 when she was killed, and went on to study graphic design and animation.

== Posthumous exhibitions ==
In 2017, Nkosi's 2006 linocut Dadewethu (My sister) was displayed at the KW Institute for Contemporary Art as part of the 10th Berlin Biennale in Germany. The print was a letter addressed to her sister where Nkosi commended her for her courage in disclosing her HIV status.

A memorial exhibition of Nkosi's work called "Gabisile Nkosi Remembered (1974-2008)" was held at the African Art Centre in 2013. Another exhibition of her work was held at the Phansi Museum, Durban, in 2019. Nkosi's work also featured in the "When Rain Clouds Gather: Black South African Women Artists, 1940–2000" exhibition, curated by Portia Malatjie and Nontobeko Ntombela and held at the Norval Foundation, Cape Town, in 2022–2023.

In 2023, the MTN South Africa Foundation's Art Collection featured Nkosi in their Women + Art video collaboration with Melanie Tait.

Nkosi's works are held in collections of galleries including the Durban Art Gallery and the MoMA. Her work has also been privately collected by celebrities such as Oprah Winfrey and Maya Angelou.
