= Lions River =

- Location within KwaZulu-Natal Location within South Africa
- Coordinates: 29.47185°S 30.15883°E
- Country: South Africa
- Province: KwaZulu-Natal
- District: uMgungundlovu
- Municipality: uMngeni

Area
  - Total: 2.41 km^{2} (0.93 sq mi)

Population (2011)
  - Total: 970
  - Density: 400/km^{2} (1,000/sq mi)

Racial makeup (2011)
  - Black African: 86.0%
  - Coloured: 7.1%
  - Indian/Asian: 6.2%
  - White: 0.7%

First languages (2011)
  - Zulu: 73.6%
  - English: 13.5%
  - Sotho: 4.6%
  - Afrikaans: 2.1%
  - Other: 6.2%
- Time zone: UTC+2 (SAST)
- PO box: 3260
- Area code: 033

Lions River is a town in uMngeni Local Municipality in the KwaZulu-Natal province of South Africa, situated between Lidgetton and Howick in the center of the KwaZulu-Natal Midlands. Its name originates from the last lion which was shot in the area in 1856.

Lions River is a rural town on the Midlands Meander route, situated within the Dargle Valley. The Lions River Conservation District covers some 2,000 square kilometres (770 sq mi). The area is well known for farming, particularly dairy. Within the town itself, the Lions River Trading Post is the most popular attraction.
