= Mlondi Dlamini =

South African soccer player (1997-2017)

Personal information
- Full name: Mlondi Edward Dlamini
- Date of birth: 3 March 1997
- Place of birth: Mpophomeni, South Africa
- Date of death: 8 October 2017 (aged 20)
- Place of death: South Africa
- Position: Midfielder

Youth career
- Maritzburg United

Senior career*
Years	Team	Apps	(Gls)
2016–2017	Maritzburg United	6	(0)
Total		6	(0)
- * Club domestic league appearances and goals

Mlondi Edward Dlamini (3 March 1997 – 8 October 2017) was a South African professional soccer player who played for Maritzburg United, as a midfielder. He died in a car accident on 8 October 2017.
