= Vonkeman =

Vonkeman is a surname of Dutch origin. The surname's origin may be toponymic from a farm named "Oud Vonkert" located in the Netherlands. As of 2014 there are believed to be 150 people with the surname in the Netherlands, 60 in Canada and 13 in South Africa.

People with the name include:

- Anke Govertine Vonkeman, wife of Dutch politician Enneüs Heerma
- Johan Vonkeman (1931–2010), Dutch missionary and author in South Africa
