= List of Mystery Hunters episodes =

The following episodes are from Mystery Hunters.

== Season 1 (2002–2003) ==
Title	Original airdate	# of episode
Skunk Ape, Bigfoot	September 9, 2002	1
Christina is on the lookout for a smelly ape-man lurking in Florida. Araya searches for the elusive Oregon Bigfoot. Doubting Dave makes a footprint cast out of plaster. Strange lights over the skies of Mexico.
Prison Inn, Seeing Ghost Dogs	September 16, 2002	2
Araya accompanies a dog on a ghost hunt. Christina stays overnight in a supposedly haunted prison cell at Ottawa Jail Hostel. Doubting Dave shows how to see our very own aura.
Ogopogo Lake Monster, Mummy Case	September 23, 2002	3
Christina searches underwater for signs of the Ogopogo Lake Monster. Araya discovers the secret behind a thousand year old Egyptian mummy at the Royal Ontario Museum. Doubting Dave mummifies a chicken and experiences his own haunted house.
New England Vampires, Aurora Borealis	September 30, 2002	4
Christina visits the grave site of an alleged vampire in Exeter, Rhode Island. Araya experiences the Aurora Borealis in Alaska. Doubting Dave shows how images can persist long after we've seen them.
Hypnosis, Pet Psychics	October 7, 2002	5
Christina subjects herself to mind control. Araya investigates the possibility of talking to pets telepathically. Doubting Dave demonstrates hypnotic illusions.
Ice Mummy, Cryonics	October 14, 2002	6
Christina investigates a Peruvian ice mummy's curse. Araya learns how frozen people come back to life. Doubting Dave stores bacteria.
Brown Mountain Lights, Spoon Bending	October 21, 2002	7
Christina visits a hilltop with mysterious brown lights in North Carolina. Araya attends a spoon-bending workshop in San Francisco. Doubting Dave moves objects with his mind.
Nazca Lines, Trophy Heads	October 22, 2002	8
Christina investigates the mysterious Nazca lines of Peru and nearby graves from a lost civilization. Araya and Doubting Dave make giant drawings in the earth.
Bermuda Triangle, Cave Ghost	October 23, 2002	9
Araya sails the Bermuda Triangle in Miami, Florida. Christina visits Mammoth Cave National Park in Kentucky and captures spooky photos of Floyd Collins. Doubting Dave demonstrates trick photography.
Mexican Mummy, Secret Animal Talk	October 24, 2002	10
Araya visits an ancient cemetery in Guanajuato, Mexico where mummies have accidentally formed. Christina discovers the secret language of animals. Doubting Dave shows how a person can become a natural mummy.
Gettysburg Ghosts, Voodoo	October 25, 2002	11
Araya searches for ghosts from the American Civil War. Christina learns how to perform friendly voodoo. Doubting Dave demonstrates various ghost hunting techniques.
Macbeth, Salem Witches	October 28, 2002	12
Araya learns about the dreaded curse behind Shakespeare's play Macbeth in Stratford-upon-Avon. Christina travels to Salem, Massachusetts where she meets a modern-day witch. Doubting Dave creates his own curse.
Sewer Gators, Dragons	December 2, 2002	13
Christina investigates reports of alligators breeding underneath New York City. Araya walks the hill where a dragon was allegedly slain. Doubting Dave makes plastic fangs.
Desert Mummy, Remote Viewing	December 9, 2002	14
Araya tests his 'PSI' abilities in a remote viewing facility. Christina unwraps an ancient mummy in Peru. Doubting Dave tests his own ESP.
Loch Ness, Whooper	December 16, 2002	15
Christina pursues some ghostly screams heard in the woods of Blackville, New Brunswick. Araya travels to Loch Ness, Scotland in search of the legendary sea creature. Doubting Dave makes his own fake Nessie video. Do mermaids exist?
Ambrose Small, Missing Princes	December 23, 2002	16
Christina investigates the haunting of Ambrose Small in The Grand Theatre in London, Ontario. Araya explores the Tower of London where two young princes were imprisoned and never found. Doubting Dave constructs a Ouija Board.
Werewolves, Dracula	December 30, 2002	17
Araya visits Count Dracula's homeland to investigate the truth behind the terrifying legend. Christina is on the hunt for a hairy wolf-beast roaming the roads and woods of Elkhorn, Wisconsin. Doubting Dave cooks up some fake blood and views a "V-File" e-mail about wolves.
Area 51, Roswell	January 6, 2003	18
Christina travels to a top-secret air force base in Rachel, Nevada where an alien spaceship is thought to be stored. Araya explores the alleged crash site of a UFO in the town of Roswell, New Mexico. Doubting Dave takes his own fake UFO photos. Why does the government want to keep aliens a secret?
Bell Witch, Anne Boleyn	January 13, 2003	19
Christina ventures to the former location of John Bell's farm in Adams, Tennessee to investigate a famous poltergeist. Araya visits the childhood home of a beheaded queen who is known to roam the grounds. Doubting Dave experiments with telekinesis.
Giant Squid, Cannibals	January 27, 2003	20
Araya fishes for giant squid in Atlantic Canada and tries to find one for himself. Christina investigates the disappeared culture of the Chaco, who were said to be cannibals. Doubting Dave has fun with suction.
Pirates, Castle Ghosts	February 17, 2003	21
Christina investigates the wreckage and artifacts of an old pirate ship. Araya visits a haunted castle in northern England. Doubting Dave performs some ghostly magic tricks.
Dinos, Imhotep	February 3, 2003	22
Christina explores the ancient homeland of the dinosaurs for clues to their extinction at Meteor Crater in Arizona. Araya travels to Saqqara, Egypt in search of the ancient pyramid builder Imhotep. Doubting Dave builds a pyramid. What happens when an asteroid hits the earth.
Alien Encounter, Crop Circles	February 10, 2003	23
Araya witnesses some mysterious crop formations. Christina investigates the site of an alien encounter in Brazil. Doubting Dave creates his own alien hoax. Do you feel there some thing watching you?
King Tut Curse, King Tut Murder	February 24, 2003	24
Was a young pharaoh murdered in ancient Egypt and is his tomb cursed? Christina and Araya both explore this ancient legend. Araya explores Valley of the Kings. Christina travels to Toronto's Hospital for Sick Children as well as the Royal Ontario Museum. Doubting Dave makes paper.
Mapinguari, Giant Sloth	March 3, 2003	25
Does a huge prehistoric creature that was thought be extinct still lurk in the Amazon jungles? Christina and Araya investigate. Doubting Dave makes a fossil.
The Best of Mystery Hunters	March 10, 2003	26
Christina, Araya and Doubting Dave exchange their scariest, funniest and wackiest moments on Mystery Hunters.

== Season 2 (2004–2005) ==
Title	Original airdate	#
Alcatraz, Cemetery Poltergeist	September 13, 2004	27
Araya gets locked into a prison cell in Alcatraz to find out if the ghosts of past prisoners haunt the place. Christina travels to Scotland to explore a poltergeist that attacks people who dare to enter his tomb. Doubting Dave takes a group of people on a fake ghost tour. Can ghosts give people rashes?
Banshee, Mothman	September 20, 2004	28
Christina goes to Ireland to investigate witnesses who lost family members after hearing a mournful scream. Araya ventures to Point Pleasant, West Virginia track down a half-man half bird creature they call - the Mothman. Doubting Dave shows how you can pretends to be psychic. If you had a dream and it comes true does that mean your psychic?
Alamo Ghost, Hampton Court Ghost Video	September 27, 2004	29
Araya heads to the Alamo in Texas to try out the latest in ghost hunting technology. Christina goes to Hampton Court Palace in England to see if a ghost really did appear there on camera. Doubting Dave creates a ghost and shows you how you can too. How can something not be seen on camera but you can see it with your own eyes?
Amazon, Thunderbird	October 4, 2004	30
Christina unearths the truth about Amazon warrior women. Araya takes to the sky on the trail of the legendary Thunderbird. Doubting Dave shows us how to make an awesome Amazon combat video. Doubting Dave answers questions about fairy rings.
Ghost Plane, Cursed Ship	October 11, 2004	31
Christina flies over the moors of England looking for wrecked planes that have been possessed to fly again. Araya dives to the wreck of a cursed ocean liner which was the RMS Empress of Ireland. Doubting Dave conjures up some killer fog. Strange lights in your house.
Irish Castle Ghosts, Jesse James	October 18, 2004	32
Christina visits Ireland to hunt for ghosts in Castle Leslie. Araya rides into the Wild West to search for the truth about the infamous outlaw, Jesse James. Doubting Dave hosts a haunted dinner party. Why do things in your house look like they move on their own.
UFO Crash, Ilkley Moor Alien Photo	October 25, 2004	33
Araya investigates a UFO crash in Nova Scotia - did the police try to cover it up? Christina tracks down a photo of what could be a real alien - did it really appear on a moor in England? Doubting Dave harnesses magnet power to make a compass. How can a plane disappear in to a cloud?
Ghost Ship, Underground Vaults	November 1, 2004	34
Araya investigates three flaming poles off the coast of Bathurst, New Brunswick. Christina listens to a recording of two men but hears a third voice cursing in Gaelic in the underground maze in the Edinburgh Vault, and a dirty man appears frequently to shout out the word heard by the third voice.
Grand Canyon Honeymooners, Bog Body	November 8, 2004	35
Araya rides the raging rapids of the Grand Canyon searching for a couple that disappeared there without a trace. Christina finds out what killed a 2000-year-old mummy buried in Denmark. Doubting Dave answers a question about an Egyptian tomb in the Grand Canyon.
Beast of Exmoor, Cadborosaurus	November 15, 2004	36
Christina goes to England to track down the mysterious creature they call - the Beast. Araya kayaks into the Pacific Ocean to search for a giant sea serpent. Doubting Dave shows how to turn your pet into a scary beast. Did dolphins come from wolves?
Frankenstein, Shadow People	November 22, 2004	37
Christina visits Castle Frankenstein in Germany in search of the famous monster. Araya ventures into a cemetery at night to capture evidence of Shadow People. Doubting Dave creates his own scary shadow creatures.
Timeslip, Sliders	November 29, 2004	38
Christina explores the possibility of time travel. Araya investigates the superpowers of people who call themselves Sliders. Doubting Dave turns on a light bulb turn by holding it in his hands. Can cyborgs from the future take over the world?
Ghost Dog, Swamp Monster	December 6, 2004	39
Christina goes to a deserted road to look for the phantom dogs that terrorize the English countryside. Araya searches a monster in the alligator-infested swamps of Louisiana. Doubting Dave makes a fake swamp monster print. Could there be a slimy sea serpent with yellow eyes?
Great Lakes, Spook Light	December 13, 2004	40
Araya searches the depths of Lake Ontario to uncover the truth about "the Great Lakes Quadrangle." Christina checks out the shadowy apparitional light in Port Perry. Doubting Dave makes a coin disappear. What can make strange lights in the woods?
River Dino, Ghost Town	December 20, 2004	41
Araya scours the desert of Colorado for proof of a living dinosaur.Christina spends the night in a ghost town. Doubting Dave recruits some kids to prove curses aren't real. Can dogs see ghosts.
Mystery Disc, Tikal	December 27, 2004	42
Christina deciphers a secret code on an ancient bronze disc called the Nebra Sky Disk found in East Germany. Araya investigates the ruins of the abandoned city of Tikal in Guatemala. Doubting Dave shows makes a secret code belt.
Cursed Island, Mayan Water Graves	December 31, 2004	43
Christina defies a curse by boating to an abandoned island's mysterious ruins. Araya dives into the sinkholes of Mexico - do they really lead to a secret underworld? Doubting Dave makes a model sinkhole. Is Friday the 13th bad luck?
Ice Mummy, Tom Thomson	January 1, 2005	44
Christina climbs a glacier in the Italian Alps to investigate the spot where a 5000-year-old ice mummy was found. Araya canoes through the Canadian wilderness to get to the bottom of a mysterious death - was it murder or a weather phenomenon? Doubting Dave makes a miniature tornado in a bottle. What can make a body be preserved ice?
Princess Anastasia, Anna Anderson	January 8, 2005	45
Christina and Araya team up to solve a royal mystery. Araya travels to Virginia to investigate claims that a Russian Princess lived in a small American town. Could the woman really be a Russian Princess who escaped her family's execution? Christina goes to Russia in search of the missing Princess Anastasia. Doubting Dave shows the tricks that pros use to impersonate people all of the time. Could you have a twin somewhere in the world?
Haunted Lighthouse, Mexican UFO	January 15, 2005	46
Christina spends the evening in the most haunted lighthouse in America.Araya takes a helicopter ride to investigate strange lights spotted by a military airplane in Mexico. Were they really UFOs? Doubting Dave makes a UFO video of his own.
Treasure Fort, Atlantis	January 22, 2005	47
Christina travels on elephant to an ancient Indian fort. Could it still hold hidden treasure? Araya dives underwater in a submarine in search of the lost city of Atlantis. Doubting Dave makes a volcano that really works!
Muhnochwa, Cyclops	January 29, 2005	48
Christina investigates the face scratchers - strange balls of light that are attacking Indian villagers at night. Araya goes out to sea in search of the Cyclops - a man-eating giant with one eye. Does the monster of Greek legend really exist? Doubting Dave shows kids some cool optical illusions they can do at home. Are there man-eating plants in the world?
Cursed Fort, Oracle of Delphi	February 7, 2005	49
Christina travels through a tiger - filled jungle in India to find an abandoned fort. Was it really cursed by a powerful Queen and are the ruins now home to ghosts called djinns? Araya investigates the temple of Delphi in Greece to uncover the secret of the Oracle's psychic power. Doubting Dave writes horoscopes for a whole classroom of kids - can he really tell their futures?
NASA UFO, Montreal UFO	February 14, 2005	50
Araya examines a film taken on the moon by NASA astronauts - is it proof that aliens exist? Christina looks for UFOs in Montreal. Doubting Dave makes his own bottle rocket. What can UFOs be during the night and day.
Taj Mahal Ghost, Labyrinth	February 21, 2005	51
Christina searches for the ghost of an emperor at the Taj Mahal in India. Araya goes deep underground to find the labyrinth, a maze that is said to be home to the Minotaur - a legendary Greek monster. Doubting Dave makes a maze of his own. Doubting Dave answers a question about ghosts in a boy's photo.
Best of Mystery Hunters	February 28, 2005	52
Christina, Araya and Doubting Dave exchange their scariest, funniest, coolest and wackiest moments on Mystery Hunters.

== Season 3 (2005–2006) ==
Title	Original airdate	#
Giant Shark	September 19, 2005	53
Araya travels to Florida and dives into the Atlantic Ocean to find a giant shark tooth. Christina goes searching for the monstrous beast in the shark-infested waters of the Pacific Ocean. Doubting Dave shows you how you can magnify things using water.
Underwater UFOs	September 26, 2005	54
Araya treks to Puerto Rico to investigate reports of strange glowing lights in the water. Christina takes a virtual reality drive through the deepest part of the ocean looking for an alien base and goes underwater for real in a mini submarine. Doubting Dave shows you how to make your own water UFO, using some soda bottles and a bicycle pump.
King's Close and Winchester House	October 3, 2005	55
Araya returns to the Edinburgh Vaults to investigate a passage inside where hundreds of people sick with a fatal and contagious disease lived and died. Christina heads to the Winchester House in California. The home was built to confuse the ghosts who were supposedly chasing the home's owner. Did these ghosts get trapped inside this monster mansion? Doubting Dave shows you how to make a screaming ghost sound that will scare your friends.
Chupacabra and Chupacabra skeleton	October 10, 2005	56
Araya goes to Puerto Rico, the place where the chupacabra first appeared. Christina goes to Texas where she digs up what could be a chupacabra skeleton. Doubting Dave tries to convince a group of kids that a mysterious monster has been spotted in the woods. Does a jackalope exist?
Stonehenge	October 17, 2005	57
Both hosts travel to England to investigate a mysterious circle of stones called Stonehenge. Araya takes to the air to see if he can discover why it was built, and Christina uncovers the bones of ancient people buried near Stonehenge - could they be the people who built it? Doubting Dave shows you how to make your own stone calendars at home.
Cave City and Underwater City	October 24, 2005	58
Christina takes a balloon ride over the lunar landscape of Capadocia, Turkey in search of the entrance to a hidden underground city. Araya jumps from a helicopter into the Caribbean Sea to investigate what looks like the remains of an ancient underwater city. Doubting Dave shows you how to make your own ant farm.
Screaming skull and Pele	October 31, 2005	59
Araya takes to the air in search of an angry goddess said to live in an active volcano in Hawaii. Christina travels to England to investigate screaming skulls. Doubting Dave makes his own mini volcano and lava.
King Midas and Blood Cave	November 7, 2005	60
Araya investigates a cave in Hawaii said to be haunted by the ghost blood of a murdered queen. Christina travels to Turkey to investigate the tomb of King Midas, the mythical king who legend says had the power to turn everything he touched into gold. Doubting Dave shows viewers how they can amaze their friends by turning a penny into gold and then back to copper again.
Alien Contact	November 14, 2005	61
Araya travels to England to meet people who say they have been contacted by aliens and brings one eyewitness to a hypnotist to see if she can remember their message. Christina meets a man who used a giant antenna to record a strange message from outer space he thinks could have come from aliens. Doubting Dave shows you how to make your own parabolic dish to pick up sounds you wouldn't otherwise hear, just like a satellite dish!
Cowboy Mummy and Cardiff Giant	November 21, 2005	62
Christina examines a cowboy "mummy" from a roadside museum in Seattle. Will she prove that some of the oddities in these monster museums are real? Araya travels to a New York curiosity museum to investigate a mummified body of a giant man. Could it be proof that a race of giants existed? Doubting Dave shows you how you can make your own fake mummy.
Fence Post Ghost and Warrior Ghosts	April 3, 2006	63
Araya goes to Hawaii to see whether the ghosts of Hawaiian warriors are returning to the road where they died. Christina investigates the fence post ghost in Hillsboro, West Virginia who is said to pop out of the cornfields at night to scare local drivers. Doubting Dave shows you how you can make your own pop-out scare.
Lusca and Lake Iliamna Monster	April 10, 2006	64
Christina travels by bush plane to this remote Alaskan lake to investigate a strange creature lurking in the depths of Lake Iliamna. Araya dives 'into the blue' to investigate a half octopus, half shark sea monster that lives in the blue water holes of the Bahamas. Doubting Dave shows you how to make your own octopus ink.
Behind the Scenes Special	April 17, 2006	65
Christina, Araya, and Doubting Dave take viewers "Behind the Scenes" of Mystery Hunters. Packed with bloopers and plenty of never before seen footage, this show will give viewers a sense of what it is really like to be a Mystery Hunter.

== Season 4 (2008–2009) ==
Title	Original airdate	#
Ghosts and Zombies	October 4, 2008	66
Christina visits a rundown amusement park to try to make friends with the ghost of a little girl. Araya has a close shave with a gang of zombies. Doubting Dave shows us a Halloween trick that will scare the heck out of passersby
Stratford-upon-Avon UFO and Taung Child	October 18, 2008	67
Our two Mystery Hunters play detective. Some super sleuthing techniques allow Christina to get to the bottom of a UFO sighting. Araya travels to South Africa to solve a 2-million-year-old crime.
Prague vampires and Inkanyamba	October 25, 2008	68
Araya and Christina are on a seriously monstrous search! Christina's investigation of vampire bones found in Prague leads to a night in the cemetery. While in South Africa, Araya scales one of the country's highest waterfalls in search of the feared Inkanyamba, Lake Monster. Can this creature from Zulu lore really cause tornadoes?
Humans Past and Future	November 1, 2008	69
These days robots are everywhere. Could they turn evil and take over the Earth? Christina has to meet a few to find out. Araya discovers the truth behind those ancient brutes known as Neanderthals.
Ancient alchemy and Lost Dutchman's Gold Mine	November 8, 2008	70
Christina and Araya team up to search for gold. Christina prowls the backstreets of Prague to find out who alchemists were; did these mysterious men really have the secret to turning cheap metal into gold? Araya goes looking for a lost gold mine whose curse is said to destroy those who try to find it.
Mima Mounds and Lalibela	November 15, 2008	71
The Mystery Hunters visit some of the most amazing and unusual places on Earth! Araya gets to the bottom of one of the wonders of the world: the stone churches of Lalibela. Were they built by some magical and unknown force? Christina examines one of the most unusual spots on Earth, the Mima Mounds – who or what created them and why? Christina investigates.
Finding the Spirits	November 22, 2008	72
In 1920, Thomas Edison told a reporter he invented a telephone that could be used to speak to the dead. Christina uses the Ghost Box to try and speak to the inventor. Araya investigates a psychic who helps the police solve crimes.
Doubting Dave's Christmas Special	December 21, 2008	73
Doubting Dave goes on a hunt for that most elusive of creatures - Santa Claus! Christina tries to figure out if Reindeer really can fly and she uncovers some surprising things. Araya searches for the magnetic north ... could Santa's workshop be hidden there?
Beasts Big and Small	January 18, 2009	74
Christina finds out that there are monsters all around us all the time - we just can't see them! And Araya tries to find out why a mysterious Lizard Man keeps coming back to the same town to terrorize its residents.
Mysterious Legends	February 8, 2009	75
Indiana Jones and many others have looked for it, but it takes a Mystery Hunter to find it – it's the Ark of the Covenant! We look for and find the most precious artifact of all in this epic trek across Ethiopia.
Out-of-body experience and Houdini	February 8, 2009	76
Many people who have almost died say they felt themselves leave their bodies. Could that really happen? Christina tries astral projection to get a glimpse of how it might be possible. One of the most mysterious men of all time, escape artist Houdini, managed to escape every trap but one... How did he die? Araya follows in his footsteps to find out.
Otherworldly Animals: Psychic Pets	February 15, 2009	77
Can your dog really read your mind? Many people think so. Araya puts them to the test. And Christina hunts down one of the scariest beasts ever: the Jersey Devil; can she overcome her fears and find the truth?
Magical Moments	February 15, 2009	78
We recap the most exciting moments of the season with the help of amazing behind the scenes footage and video diaries taken by the Mystery Hunters themselves.
