= Howick High School =

Co-educational public school in South Africa

Coordinates: 29.47937°S 30.20928°E

Howick High School is a coeducational public school in Howick, KwaZulu-Natal, South Africa, established on 27 June 1967. Whilst it has a weekly boarding facility, known as Midmar House, which can accommodate up to 100 students who live in the local surrounding districts, Howick High School is not a full-time boarding school.

== Introduction ==
Howick High School is situated in the village of Howick in the KwaZulu Natal Midlands. The school overlooks Midmar Dam with large grounds that facilitate out-door sport facilities. Howick High is an English-medium, co-educational school and was established in 1967.

Whilst the school has a weekly boarding establishment, known as Midmar House, which can accommodate up to 100 learners from the local surrounding districts, Howick High School is not a full-time boarding school.

The Howick High school badge depicts a rampant lion which is representative of the Lion's River district and symbolizes strength and purity.} The star on its raised front paw symbolizes the qualities of integrity, loyalty, tenacity, virtue and charity.} The school motto is "Age Quod Agis" which loosely translated means "do what you do well".

== School history ==
Mr. J.G. Hattingh had a vision for the future of education in Howick and persevered in his quest for the establishment of a secondary school in Howick which came to fruition in 1965. Twenty-three pupils were enrolled. They, together with the staff, were accommodated in the Howick Preparatory School buildings for two years.

On 27 June 1967 150 pupils and staff, together with the headmaster, Mr. Gerard Hattingh, and deputy headmaster, Mr. Ken Kyte, walked from the preparatory school to the site of the proposed new school in Amber Avenue. There the pupils were housed in prefabricated buildings for six years whilst the new buildings were under construction. This school was affectionately known as "The Cardboard College". On completion of the school buildings in 1973, 300 pupils moved into the new school buildings. Midmar House Hostel was also constructed and completed during this period and is now home to 100 weekly boarders.

In the 1980s the Dave Mayo Centre was built as a utility centre, used for various activities and events. The most recent addition to these facilities are two squash courts, named after past headmaster Rob Langley (retired December 2015), which were completed and officially opened on 1 September 2017.

== Midmar House ==
Midmar House Hostel is home to approximately 100 boarders (Grade 8 to 12), with a more or less equal number of boys and girls.

== Facilities ==
The school sport facilities include a swimming pool, tennis and squash courts, hockey fields, rugby fields, soccer fields, netball and basketball courts as well as cricket fields & nets.

== Notable alumni ==
- Ann Ashworth, Class of 2001, Winner of the women's Comrades Marathon 2018
- Jason Hartman, class of 1997, winner of SA Idols competition in 2009
- Neil Johnson, national cricket player and SA cricket commentator
