= George Neville Holmes =

South African judge and World War II veteran

George Neville Holmes (10 July 1907 - May 1990) was a judge on the Appellate Division of South Africa. He is often considered one of the South African judiciary's best prose stylists.

Holmes was born in Howick, Natal, in 1907. He studied at Natal University, earning a BA and LLB. In 1931 he joined the Durban bar. On 2 April 1952 he became a judge of the Natal Provincial Division and from 1961 to 1977 served on the Appellate Division.

Holmes served in the Allied forces during the Second World War and was held for a time as a prisoner of war.
