= Geoffrey Hart-Davis =

South African cricketer (1905–1941)

Personal information
- Full name: Geoffrey Charles Hart-Davis
- Born: 15 September 1905; Lidgetton, Colony of Natal
- Died: 9 December 1941 (aged 36); MV Sebastiano Veniero, Mediterranean Sea
- Nickname: Jumbo
- Role: Wicket-keeper

Domestic team information
- Years: Team
- 1927/28: Natal

Career statistics
Competition	First-class
Matches	2
Runs scored	8
Batting average	4.00
100s/50s	0/0
Top score	6
Catches/stumpings	3/0
- Source: Cricinfo, 29 July 2020

Geoffrey Charles Hart-Davis (15 September 1905 – 9 December 1941) was a South African First-class cricketer and soldier.

Hart-Davis was born in Lidgetton on 15 September 1905. His two appearances in cricket took place in early December 1927 at the City Oval. Between 30 November and 2 December, Hart-Davis took part in his debut match for Natal against the Marylebone Cricket Club (MCC). In the first inning he was caught by Ernest Tyldesley off the bowling of Greville Stevens after making 6 runs. During the second inning, Hart-Davis caught Herbert Sutcliffe and Stevens off the bowling of Francis Smith and Clifford Tutton respectively. Representing Natal against the MCC between 3-6 December, Hart-Davis caught Percy Holmes off the bowling of Tutton before himself scoring 2 runs.

Hart-Davis served as a private in the Transvaal Scottish during the Second World War. Captured by German forces during the North African campaign, he was loaded on board the MV Sebastiano Veniero to be transported to Europe. Off Pylos, the ship was torpedoed by HMS Porpoise, killing Hart-Davis and another 300 prisoners of war. His body was later recovered and interred at the Halfaya Sollum War Cemetery.
