= Mpophomeni =

- Location within KwaZulu-Natal Location within South Africa
- Coordinates: 29.567°S 30.182°E
- Country: South Africa
- Province: KwaZulu-Natal
- District: UMgungundlovu
- Municipality: uMngeni

Area
  - Total: 4.58 km^{2} (1.77 sq mi)

Population (2011)
  - Total: 25,732
  - Density: 5,620/km^{2} (14,600/sq mi)

Racial makeup (2011)
  - Black African: 99.6%
  - Coloured: 0.2%
  - Indian/Asian: 0.1%
  - Other: 0.1%

First languages (2011)
  - Zulu: 90.2%
  - English: 5.6%
  - Other: 4.2%
- Time zone: UTC+2 (SAST)
- Postal code (street): 3291
- PO box: 3291
- Area code: 033

Mpophomeni is a town in Umgungundlovu District Municipality in the KwaZulu-Natal province of South Africa.

== History ==
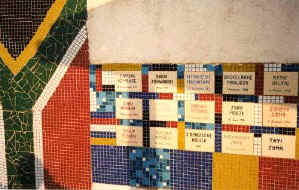
Mpophomeni wall to remember those who died during struggle

In 1968 the South African government built in an open field a township called Mpophomeni to relocate the black people living in the surroundings of Howick, a picturesque little town in the Natal Midlands. Mpophomeni (which means the place of the waterfall in isiZulu) derives its name from the well known Howick waterfall.

In the late 1980s and early 1990s there was a fight between the community of Mpophomeni and the people living in the rural areas of Kwa Shifu, Haza and Mashingeni. The community of Mpophomeni were ANC (African National Congress)supporters and the rural areas were strongly behind the opposing IFP (Inkatha Freedom Party). The death of Nokulunga Gumede, a five-year-old girl who was run down by a military vehicle (Casper) during the violence taking place in the township at the time was a catalyst for change – no-one stopped the violence when they had the chance.

Reconciliation only truly started between the township and the rural occupants in 1993 and 1994. A memorial was built in remembrance of this and named after Nokulunga Gumede - the youngest victim of the violence as well as commemorating the 120 people that died.

There are three high schools, Mpophomeni High, Asibemunye and Umthombo as well as five primary schools namely, Sifisesihle, Zamuthule, Qhamukile, Isibongo and Nhlanhleni.

Activities include: annual dog show; Zulu Mpophomeni Tourism Experience; Enviro-clubs; AIDS Ministry; ThinkQuest Competition; Mpophomeni Computer Centre and SchoolNet; Centre for Criminal Justice.
