= UMngeni Local Municipality =

Coordinates: 29.4924°S 30.2262°E

uMgeni
- Local municipality
- Seal
- Interactive map of uMgeni
- Country: South Africa
- Province: KwaZulu-Natal
- District: uMgungundlovu
- Seat: Howick
- Wards: 13

Government
  - Type: Municipal council
  - Mayor: Chris Pappas (DA)
  - Deputy Mayor: Sandile Mnikathi (DA)

Area
  - Total: 1,567 km^{2} (605 sq mi)

Population (2022)
  - Total: 105,069
  - Density: 67.05/km^{2} (173.7/sq mi)

Racial makeup (2022)
  - Black African: 66.7%
  - Coloured: 2.3%
  - Indian/Asian: 7.6%
  - White: 22.9%

First languages (2011)
  - Zulu: 64.3%
  - English: 25.5%
  - Sotho: 3.8%
  - Afrikaans: 2.1%
  - Other: 4.3%
- Time zone: UTC+2 (SAST)
- Municipal code: KZN222

uMngeni Municipality (Zulu: UMasipala wase Mngeni) is a local municipality within the Umgungundlovu District Municipality, in the KwaZulu-Natal province of South Africa. The municipality is named after the uMngeni River that runs through the municipal area.

== Main places ==
The 2011 census divided the municipality into the following main places:

Place	Code	Area (km^{2})	Population	Most spoken language
Balgowan		3.84	980	English
Cedara		16.17	1,280	Zulu
Cedarge		6.78	5,888	Zulu
Emashingeni		2.52	720	Zulu
Fort Nottingham		0.52	38	Zulu
Garlington		1.35	186	English
Hilton		30.90	9,340	English
Howick		29.32	21,639	English
Karkloof Nature Reserve		7.99	0	
KwaMevana		3.16	5,102	Zulu
Lidgetton West		7.99	4,521	Zulu
Lions River		2.41	970	Zulu
Midmar		29.68	95	Zulu
Mpophomeni		4,58	25,732	Zulu
Nottingham Road		3.07	1,277	Zulu
Zenzani		0.43	509	Zulu
Remainder of the municipality		1,415.79	14,443	Zulu

== Politics ==
The municipal council consists of twenty-five members elected by mixed-member proportional representation. Thirteen councilors are elected by first-past-the-post voting in thirteen wards, while the remaining are chosen from party lists so that the total number of party representatives is proportional to the number of votes received. In the 2026 South African municipal elections the Democratic Alliance (DA) won an increased majority of fifteen seats in the council.

The following table shows the results of the 2026 election.

Party	Ward			List			Total seats
Party	Votes	%	Seats	Votes	%	Seats	Total seats
Democratic Alliance	23,622	59.68	10	24,782	62.59	5	15
uMkhonto weSizwe Party	7,569	19.12	1	7,196	18.17	4	5
African National Congress	6,615	16.71	2	5,903	14.91	2	4
Inkatha Freedom Party	483	1.22	0	462	1.17	1	1
17 other parties	1,294	3.27	0	1,253	3.16	0	0
Total	39,583	100.00	13	39,596	100.00	12	25
Valid votes	39,583	98.70		39,596	99.03		
Invalid/blank votes	523	1.30		388	0.97		
Total votes	40,106	100.00		39,984	100.00		
Registered voters/turnout	61,597	65.11		61,597	64.91		
