= Anthony Ardington =

South African cricketer

Personal information
- Full name: Anthony John Ardington
- Born: 26 March 1940; Natal, South Africa
- Died: 17 October 2023 (aged 83)
- Batting: Right-handed

Domestic team information
- Years: Team
- 1965: Oxford University
- FC debut: 15 May 1965 Oxford University v Lancashire
- Last FC: 29 May 1965 Oxford University v Leicestershire

Career statistics
Competition	First-class
Matches	3
Runs scored	29
Batting average	5.80
100s/50s	0/0
Top score	11
Catches/stumpings	1/–
- Source: CricketArchive, 17 January 2009

Anthony John Ardington (26 March 1940 – 17 October 2023) was a first-class cricketer with Oxford University who played in three matches in the 1965 season. He was born in Howick, KwaZulu Natal, South Africa.

A Rhodes Scholar, he became a prominent businessman in his native South Africa, before his death from Alzheimer's disease on 17 October 2023.
