= David Acer =

Canadian comedian and magician (born 1970)

- Born: February 27, 1970 (age 55); Montreal, Quebec, Canada
- Occupation(s): Comedian, close-up magician, author

David Acer (/ˈækər/; born 27 February 1970) is a Canadian author, stand-up comedian, close-up illusionist, inventor of magic tricks, and co-host/co-writer of the syndicated television series Mystery Hunters.

His writing on the Canadian documentary series Mystery Hunters earned him two Gemini Awards nominations (the Canadian equivalent of the Emmys) for Best Writing in a Children's Non-Fiction series (2005 and 2007), and he wrote a book based on his segments on the series called Gotcha! 18 Amazing Ways to Freak Out Your Friends, published by Kids Can Press in 2008.

Gotcha! was a Canadian best-seller and was nominated for two children's book awards, a Willow Award and a Hackmatack Children's Choice Award, and won the Hackmatack award in 2008/2009.

Acer, who hails from Montreal, has also written for other Canadian television shows such as Popular Mechanics for Kids, YTV's Prank Patrol and TVO's Finding Stuff Out.

== Biography ==
His career as a stand-up comedian began in 1989. By then, Acer was a recognized close-up magician and inventor of magic tricks, and had published original sleight-of-hand effects in a multitude of trade magazines. But stand-up comedy evolved as a separate career, with little to no overlap in terms of content. As a stand-up comedian, Acer has appeared on Canadian television shows such as CBC's Just For Laughs, The Comedy Network's Just For Laughs: The Lost Tapes, CTV's Comedy Now!, Comedy at Club 54 and in the U.S. on A&E's Comedy on the Road and ABC's America's Funniest People. In 2013 he won his first national (comedic) debate on CBC Radio's popular series The Debaters.

As a close-up magician he has lectured around the world on his original tricks and authored four books. His latest, More Power To You, was published in 2011 by Hermetic Press (Seattle, WA), and has since been translated into French and published by Marchand de Trucs as Anthologie: David Acer. David also appeared on the cover of the October 2010 issue of the American magic periodical Genii, and has performed his original magic on Discovery's Grand Illusions, in England on Sky One's The Secret World of Magic, and in Japan on NHK's F.I.S.M. 2000.

In 2007, Acer was invited to lecture at Fechter's Finger Flicking Frolic, a close-up magic convention held in upstate New York (USA) and limited to fewer than 150 hand-picked attendees.

He has also performed at The Magic Castle and FISM. He has also authored several books on magic. Since 2002, he has had a regular column in Genii magazine. Acer wrote 5 episodes of the 1997–2001 series, "Popular Mechanics for Kids".

As a comedian and actor, he has had roles on the television program Mystery Hunters and in the film Levity as well as performing numerous times at Montreal's Just for Laughs festival. He also appeared on YTV's popular show Prank Patrol, where he helped one of the young pranksters by showing her how to do some easy magic tricks.
