= Johan Vonkeman =

Dutch missionary

Johan "Hans" Vonkeman
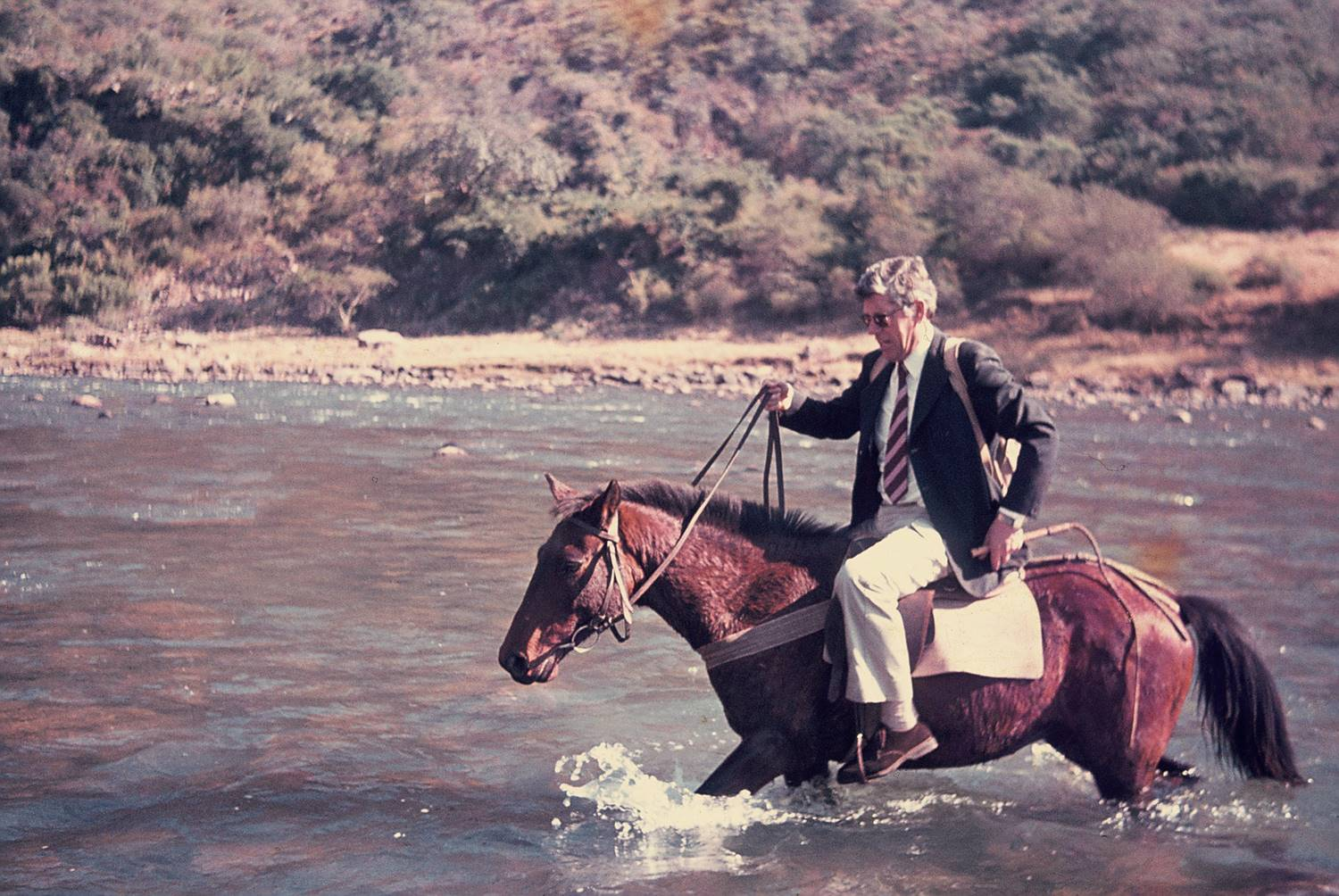
- Born: February 18, 1931; Amersfoort
- Died: October 28, 2010 (aged 79); Howick, KwaZulu-Natal
- Citizenship: South Africa
- Education: Theological University of the Reformed Churches, University of South Africa
- Occupations: Missionary, Pastor, Reverend
- Spouse: Rens Vonkeman (23 December 1933 - 8 January 2021)
- Children: 5

Ecclesiastical career
- Religion: Christian
- Church: Reformed Church
- Ordained: 1957
- Writings: Door zoeloes geboeid: zendingsontmoetingen in Afrika
- Congregations: Reformed Mission eNkumane, Gereformeerde Kerk Pietermaritzburg
- Title: Reverend
- Website: mayibongwe.nl

Johan "Hans" Vonkeman (18 February 1931 - 28 October 2010) was born in Amersfoort, the Netherlands. He attended university in Kampen, the Netherlands, and later in life at UNISA in Pretoria, South Africa.

He was ordained in 1957 and in 1958 he departed to South Africa as a missionary accompanied by his wife, Rens Vonkeman. The Reformed Mission Enkumane was launched in 1960, an initiative of the Free Reformed Church in Kampen, the Netherlands. The Trust Farm Groothoek in the centre of eNkumane was chosen as a mission area. Vonkeman held the first service at eNkumane on Christmas Day 1959 in a local homestead. Over time the mission expanded, a church and a clinic were built on the slopes of eThafeni, as well as accommodation and facilities for those attending church-run courses.

He retired as a missionary in 1990 and continued to volunteer as a crisis counselor and guest preacher in his local church. In the 1990s Vonkeman contributed to the Dutch Reformed Church Newspaper "Opbouw" as a columnist. In 1995 he released a collection of these writings in a book named "Door Zoeloe's geboeid".

Reformed Mission eNkumane
