= Harry Preston (writer) =

South African writer (1923–2009)

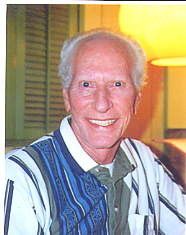
- Harry Preston in 1994
- Born: 4 September 1923; Durban, South Africa
- Died: 23 November 2009 (aged 86); Dallas, Texas, U.S.
- Occupations: screenwriter, short story writer, author

Harry Preston (born Harry Pimm; September 4, 1923 – November 23, 2009) was an author and Hollywood screenwriter. His credits included over 90 published books and over 300 films of all types, from feature films to industrials, commercials, documentaries and training films.

== Early life and education ==
Harry Preston was born Harry Pimm in Durban, South Africa. His father was Richard Henry Pimm, a chemist who migrated from Tamworth, England, to Cape Town, South Africa, where he opened a chemist shop. After moving to Kimberly, SA, Henry Pimm married Lilian Catherine Walter, daughter of George A. Walter, a US Vice Consul to South Africa starting in 1872. While living in Kimberly, the Walters became family friends of Cecil Rhodes, founder of the De Beers Diamond Company. Henry and Lilian Pimm eventually moved to Durban, where Henry and his brother, William Pimm, founded WR Pimm & Co., a local chain of chemist shops.

Harry Pimm grew up in Howick, a little town nestling near the Drakensberg Mountains near Pietermaritzburg, KwaZulu-Natal Province, South Africa, 185 kilometres (115 mi) inland from Durban. His family moved to Durban after the crash of 1929, where he attended St. Henry's Marist Brothers' College, a co-educational private school with a Catholic foundation in Glenwood, Durban, KwaZulu-Natal, South Africa. Harry Pimm spent ten years at St. Henry's, where he received an in-depth primary education, matriculating at the age of fifteen as the youngest student up to that time ever to graduate. Several months wait were required before his enrolment at the University of Natal because the minimum age limit for college was sixteen. Harry Pimm began writing children's stories and books while still in his teens, moving on quickly to writing adult articles and short stories for major South African newspapers and magazines.

== Biography ==
Harry Pimm moved to the U.S. in 1948. When he became an American citizen, he changed his last name to Preston. He settled in Dallas, Texas, where he began writing and directing low-budget films for the young Dallas film industry.

While news editor at WFAA-TV, Channel 8, the ABC station in Dallas, Harry Preston wrote TORNADO, a documentary on the devastating tornado in Dallas in 1957, which won the Sylvania Award. He also wrote several Dallas television series, notably Spotlight on Texas sponsored by Southwestern Bell Telephone, as well as writing many Viewpoint columns in the Dallas Morning News.

In 1959, Harry Preston moved to California, where he joined Metro-Goldwyn-Mayer Studios as an analyst and rewrite man. The writers’ strike in 1962 forced him to move east to join the famous Jam Handy Studios in Detroit, where one of his commercials (for “Religion in American Life”) was nominated for an industry award.

After the Detroit riots of 1967, he returned to the West Coast, where he resumed work authoring fiction and non-fiction books. His book Everything a Teenager Wants to Know About Sex and Should (Books for Better Living) received rave reviews and went into seven printings.

Among Harry Preston’s many novels are 14 romance novels he wrote for MacFadden which were published under the pseudonym “Vanessa Cartwright”.

Following a year's visit to Cape Town in 1971, he wrote a supernatural horror tale set in South Africa called Queen of Darkness (Manor Books). During the 1970s, he also wrote many training films for the United States Air Force at Norton AFB in California.

In 1976, Mr. Preston moved back to Dallas and now works closely with the Texas film and literary communities. In 1989 he received a Life Achievement Award at the Corpus Christi Film Festival for his contribution to the Texas film industry. Since 1990 he has taught screenwriting at Richland College in Dallas and actively markets scripts and books through his literary agency - Stanton & Associates Literary Agency.

In 2002, his biography of former Broadway and movie star Thelma White, titled Thelma Who? was published by Scarecrow Press and was selected as one of the top ten best books of 2002 by CLASSIC IMAGES, the national movie magazine. In 2003, Mr. Preston's latest novels Faces of Angels and Shot in Dallas were published.

Harry Preston's biography Omar Sharif Loved My Cheescake is currently being considered for publication.

== Selected bibliography ==
=== As Harry Preston ===
- Everything a Teenager Wants to Know About Sex and Should (ISBN 0870563289, Books for Better Living, 1973)
- The Natural Food Reducing Diet (ISBN 0870563572, Books for Better Living, 1974)
- Queen of Darkness (Manor Books, 1976)
- I Plead Insanity: When Manic Depression Turns Violent, with Paul Rollins (ISBN 0962321648, Odenwald Pr, 1993)
- Faces of Angels (ISBN 1588516733, Publish America, 2001)
- Thelma Who? Almost 100 Years of Showbiz (ISBN 0810841266, Scarecrow Press, Inc, 2002)
- Shot In Dallas (ISBN 1413701264, Publish America, 2003)

=== As Vanessa Cartwright ===
- Wine of Love (ISBN 0897720385) MacFadden Romance Series #39.
- Appointment in Antibes (ISBN 0897720423) MacFadden Romance Series #82.
- Wife Without Love (ISBN 0897721020) MacFadden Romance Series #85
- Summer in Stockholm (ISBN 089772058X) MacFadden Romance Series #93.
- Triston's Lair (ISBN 0897721659) MacFadden Romance Series #149.

== Filmography ==
- Honeymoon Horror (1982)
