= Sandbank (disambiguation) =

A sandbank is a landform consisting of a sand bar in water, which creates a shallow area which may pose a hazard to watercraft.

Sandbank is also the name of various specific places:

- Sandbank, Argyll, a village in Scotland
- Sandbanks, a spit in Poole harbour in the south of England
- Sandbanks Provincial Park, a provincial park in Ontario, Canada
- Sandbanks National Park, a national park in Queensland, Australia

== People with the surname ==
- Charles Sandbank (1931–2008), British electronics engineer
