= Mystery Hunters =

Canadian documentary television series

- Created by: Jonathan Finkelstein
- Starring: Christina Broccolini; Araya Mengesha; David Acer
- Countries of origin: Canada
- No. of seasons: 4
- No. of episodes: 78 (list of episodes)

Production
- Producer: Jason Levy
- Running time: 25 minutes
- Production company: Apartment 11 Productions

Original release
- Network: YTV
- Release: September 9, 2002 – February 15, 2009

Mystery Hunters is a Canadian documentary television series aimed at a young audience. It aired on YTV and ABC Spark in Canada and on Discovery Kids and MeTV in the United States. It was also dubbed in Japanese and aired in Japan on NHK.

Teenage hosts Araya and Christina investigate paranormal or global historical reports of mysteries such as legendary creatures/monsters, disembodied spirits, dinosaurs and aliens/unidentified flying objects. They use scientific rigour to try to find plausible explanations for the sightings and eye-witness accounts that trigger their investigations. In another section of the show, Doubting Dave, a scientist played by David Acer, attempts to explain mysterious personal experiences that have been emailed in by viewers, in a feature called "V-Files", as well as a way to create your own versions of the mysteries in the show in his "Mystery Lab" segment.

Produced by Apartment 11 Productions, four seasons and 78 episodes of the series have been made, and it has garnered awards and accolades from around the world, including eight Gemini Award nominations, a 2006 Parents' Choice Award, and a 2007 Japan Prize (sponsored by the Japanese television network NHK) for the "Stonehenge" episode, awarded the Minister of Internal Affairs and Communications Prize in the Early Education category.

== Sequence ==
The program begins with a question that introduces the two investigations of the week, leading into the opening title sequence. Then follows part one of each of the two stories with Araya and Christina each featured in one. Then the "V-File"; Doubting Dave answers a viewer's question about some mysterious occurrence. Then, part two of each adventure. Next comes the "Mystery Lab" segment featuring Doubting Dave doing some kind of experiment or laboratory demonstration to illustrate a point that is most often related to that week's theme. Finally, Araya and Christina conclude their stories. At the conclusion of each program, the hosts appear together in a comedic wrap-up link, usually closing out with the Mystery Hunters signature tag-line: "Remember, things aren't always what they seem!"

== Episodes ==
Mystery Hunters has aired 78 episodes over four seasons.

== Characters ==
=== Doubting Dave ===
Doubting Dave, played by David Acer, has two segments in each episode, in which he provides more logical answers. In one segment, he answers questions sent in to Mystery Hunters by fans of the show. In the other, he conducts an experiment that has to do with the episode's topic (e.g. UFOs)

=== Araya and Christina ===
Christina Broccolini and Araya Mengesha are the ones who go to a wide variety of locations to investigate the topic(s) included in the show. In most episodes, they go to separate locations, but in some episodes, they go together to the same location.

== Music ==
Claude Castonguay, Christian Clermont and Marc Ouellette compose the musical score for Mystery Hunters. It is a mixture of pop, techno and orchestral styles. The composers were nominated for Music Score for a Documentary Program or Series".

== DVD releases ==
In September 2007, the first-ever Mystery Hunters DVD was released in Canada, a three-episode collection timed for Halloween called Mystery Hunters: Beastly Beings and Monstrous Mysteries, and in the Fall of 2008, a Mystery Hunters/Doubting Dave guide to paranormal tricks and hoaxes called Gotcha! 18 Amazing Ways to Freak Out Your Friends will be published by Kids Can Press.

Another DVD was released early December 2007, titled Mystery Hunters: Alien Encounters, featuring three episodes from the series about the said topic. Extras include interviews with the cast and a behind the scenes featurette with Araya.

== Online games ==
In September 2010, a set of Mystery Hunters themed online adventure games entitled Mystery Hunters Training School was released. The website was produced in an 'interactive comic book' format containing 13 episodic adventures featuring intro and closing videos from Christina and Araya, quizzes in Doubting Dave's voice, and puzzle games and animation following themes presented in the show.
