= Howick, South Africa =

Howick
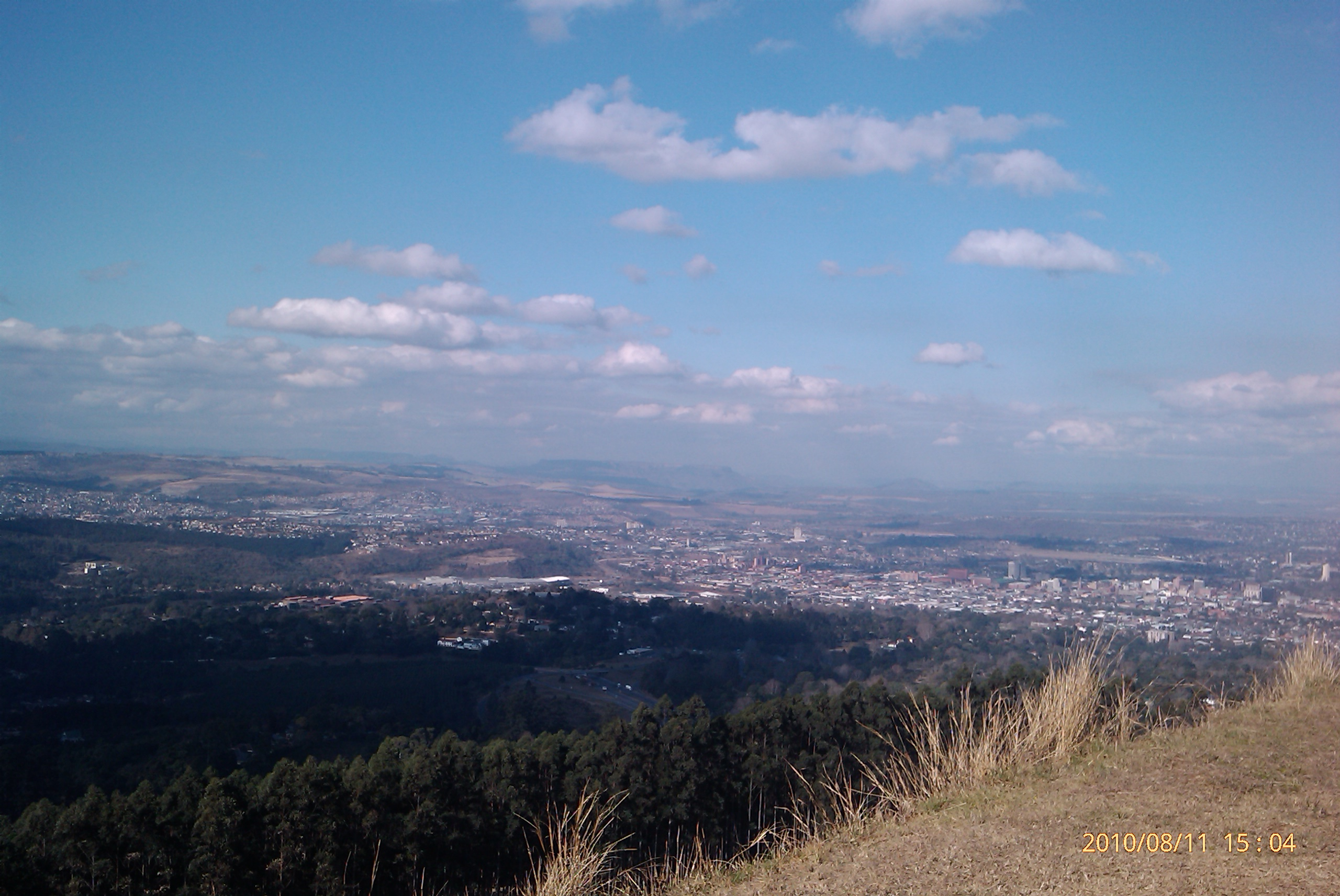
- View of Pietermaritzburg from World's View

- Location within KwaZulu-Natal Location within South Africa
- Coordinates: 29°28′S 30°14′E
- Country: South Africa
- Province: KwaZulu-Natal
- District: UMgungundlovu
- Municipality: uMngeni
- Established: 1850

Area
  - Total: 29.32 km^{2} (11.32 sq mi)

Population (2011)
  - Total: 21,639
  - Density: 738.0/km^{2} (1,911/sq mi)

Racial makeup (2011)
  - Black African: 47.0%
  - Coloured: 4.1%
  - Indian/Asian: 13.5%
  - White: 35.1%
  - Other: 0.3%

First languages (2011)
  - English: 51.4%
  - Zulu: 40.3%
  - Afrikaans: 3.8%
  - Sotho: 1.1%
  - Other: 3.4%
- Time zone: UTC+2 (SAST)
- Postal code (street): 3290
- PO box: 3290
- Area code: 033

Howick is a town located in the UMngeni Local Municipality of KwaZulu-Natal Province, South Africa. The town is 1050 m above sea level, and about 88 kilometres from the port city of Durban. It experiences warm summers and cool, dry winters. A snappy chill descends upon Howick when snow falls on the nearby Drakensberg. The town is located on the N3 freeway, connecting it with the rest of South Africa.

The town is the location of Howick Falls, which is a large waterfall that occurs when the Umgeni River falls 95 metres (311 feet) over dolerite cliffs on its way to the Indian Ocean. The waterfall was known as kwaNogqaza or "The Place of the Tall One" by the original Zulu inhabitants. There are several other waterfalls in the vicinity and all of them have claimed human lives. Near Howick are Cascade Falls (25 m) and Shelter Falls (37 m), while Karkloof Falls (105 m) is 16 km to the east.

There are also a number of schools in Howick, including Howick High School.

== History ==
During the 1840s colonisers moving north from Pietermaritzburg crossed the Umgeni River just west of present-day Howick at the Alleman's Drift. In 1849, the Wesleyan Missionary James Archbell bought three farms above the northern bank of the Umgeni River. Title deeds of the original plots simply named the area "The Village on the Umgeni Waterfall". In 1850, the river crossing was moved to the dangerous but more convenient spot at the top of the Falls. This was less than 200 metres (660 feet) from where the river plunged over the cliff's edge. It was a treacherous spot, and many travellers and wagons were swept over the falls. With the increase in traffic to the north, the Government decided to establish a village at the crossing, and purchased part of James Archbell's farm. In November 1850, a proclamation appeared in the Natal Government Gazette, offering 36 village allotments on the Umgeni Waterfall Drift for sale. This marked the beginning of the town. In choosing a name for the new town, Government officials decided to honour their Secretary of State for the Colonies in London. He was Earl Grey, and had recently acquired the title of Lord Howick. The name derived from his ancestral home of Howick Hall in Northumberland, England. Two other towns were named "Howick" at the same time: one in New Zealand, and the other in Ontario, Canada.

Howick is possibly the location of the first crewed flight in the world. Evidence exists that a John Goodman Household flew a self made glider in 1871 and again in 1875 on the outskirts of Howick, close to Karkloof. The actual distance flown and altitude achieved differs from source to source (some sources say the distance was 80 metres (260 feet)) but what can be verified is that the distance flown was further, and the duration also longer, than either of the flights made by Lilienthal or the Wright brothers. Today there exists a memorial to Household's achievement at Curry's Post, also a small distance outside Howick.

The Umgeni Valley Ranch or Nature Reserve was established in the 1970s on the then outskirts of Howick by the Wildlife and Environment Society of South Africa (WESSA). The nature reserve consists largely of the deep valley cut by the Mngeni River below the Howick Falls into the surrounding sandstone. WESSA reintroduced game into the area, such as zebra and wildebeest, and established a number of huts for overnight accommodation.

In December 1996 Nelson Mandela was awarded "The Freedom of Howick". This followed his arrest some 34 years before, on 5 August 1962, on the main Durban-Johannesburg road, as it was then — more particularly, between Howick and Lidgetton West. The previously small plaque commemorating the event has since been revamped into a fully operational Mandela Monument with a museum and large bust sculpture of Nelson Mandela, only fully distinguished when viewed from the end of the path from the museum towards the sculpture. The sculpture was created by Marco Cianfanelli and is constructed of steel beams of between 6.5 and 9.5 metres (21.3 and 31.2 feet) in length.

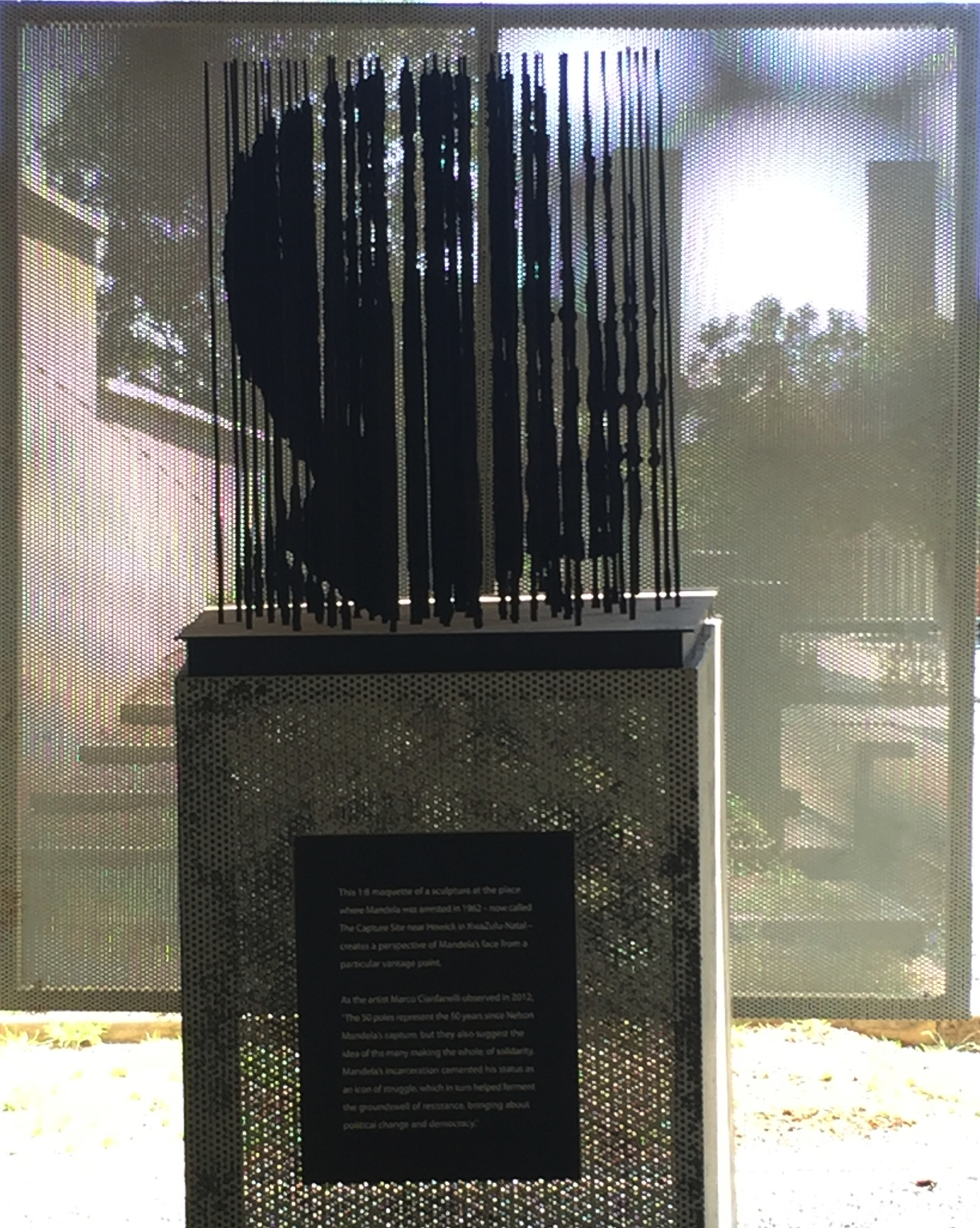
Replica of Nelson Mandela Artwork at Apartheid Museum by Marco Cianfanelli

The annual Mandela day marathon takes place in Imbali, Pietermaritzburg and finishes at the Mandela capture site in Howick.

In recent years Howick has expanded significantly following the establishment of a number of major retirement villages, such as Amberfield, Amberglen, Amber Valley, Amber Ridge, BrandonsField and Amber Lakes, that flank the Karkloof Falls Road.

== Notable people ==
- Mabhuti Khenyeza – Former South Africa national football team player & soccer coach
- Anthony Ardington – Former first-class cricketer with Oxford University & businessman
- Harry Preston (writer) – Author, Hollywood screenwriter. Grew up in Howick

== Climate ==
Climate data for Cedara College of Agriculture, elevation 1,071 m (3,514 ft), (1991–2020 normals, extremes 1959–2023)
Month	Jan	Feb	Mar	Apr	May	Jun	Jul	Aug	Sep	Oct	Nov	Dec	Year
Record high °C (°F)	37.8 (100.0)	36.6 (97.9)	35.9 (96.6)	35.1 (95.2)	30.7 (87.3)	29.0 (84.2)	29.0 (84.2)	32.4 (90.3)	37.0 (98.6)	36.4 (97.5)	37.3 (99.1)	40.4 (104.7)	40.4 (104.7)
Mean daily maximum °C (°F)	26.4 (79.5)	27.0 (80.6)	25.9 (78.6)	23.9 (75.0)	22.1 (71.8)	20.7 (69.3)	20.4 (68.7)	22.2 (72.0)	24.2 (75.6)	23.1 (73.6)	24.6 (76.3)	26.1 (79.0)	23.9 (75.0)
Daily mean °C (°F)	20.8 (69.4)	21.1 (70.0)	19.9 (67.8)	17.3 (63.1)	14.3 (57.7)	12.1 (53.8)	11.9 (53.4)	13.9 (57.0)	16.6 (61.9)	17.0 (62.6)	18.5 (65.3)	20.2 (68.4)	17.0 (62.5)
Mean daily minimum °C (°F)	15.2 (59.4)	15.3 (59.5)	13.8 (56.8)	10.8 (51.4)	6.7 (44.1)	3.4 (38.1)	3.4 (38.1)	5.6 (42.1)	9.0 (48.2)	11.0 (51.8)	12.4 (54.3)	14.3 (57.7)	10.1 (50.1)
Record low °C (°F)	3.6 (38.5)	6.0 (42.8)	3.4 (38.1)	−0.1 (31.8)	−2.2 (28.0)	−4.2 (24.4)	−5.7 (21.7)	−3.6 (25.5)	−2.6 (27.3)	−0.4 (31.3)	2.4 (36.3)	3.7 (38.7)	−5.7 (21.7)
Average precipitation mm (inches)	138.3 (5.44)	108.3 (4.26)	95.7 (3.77)	51.4 (2.02)	22.8 (0.90)	11.9 (0.47)	19.1 (0.75)	15.6 (0.61)	27.5 (1.08)	93.4 (3.68)	114.1 (4.49)	144.8 (5.70)	842.9 (33.17)
Average precipitation days (≥ 0.25 mm)	16.8	13.7	13.3	6.4	3.9	1.6	1.7	2.7	7.4	15.1	14.4	18.4	115.4
Source: Starlings Roost Weather

== See also ==
- Howick Falls
