= Howick Falls =

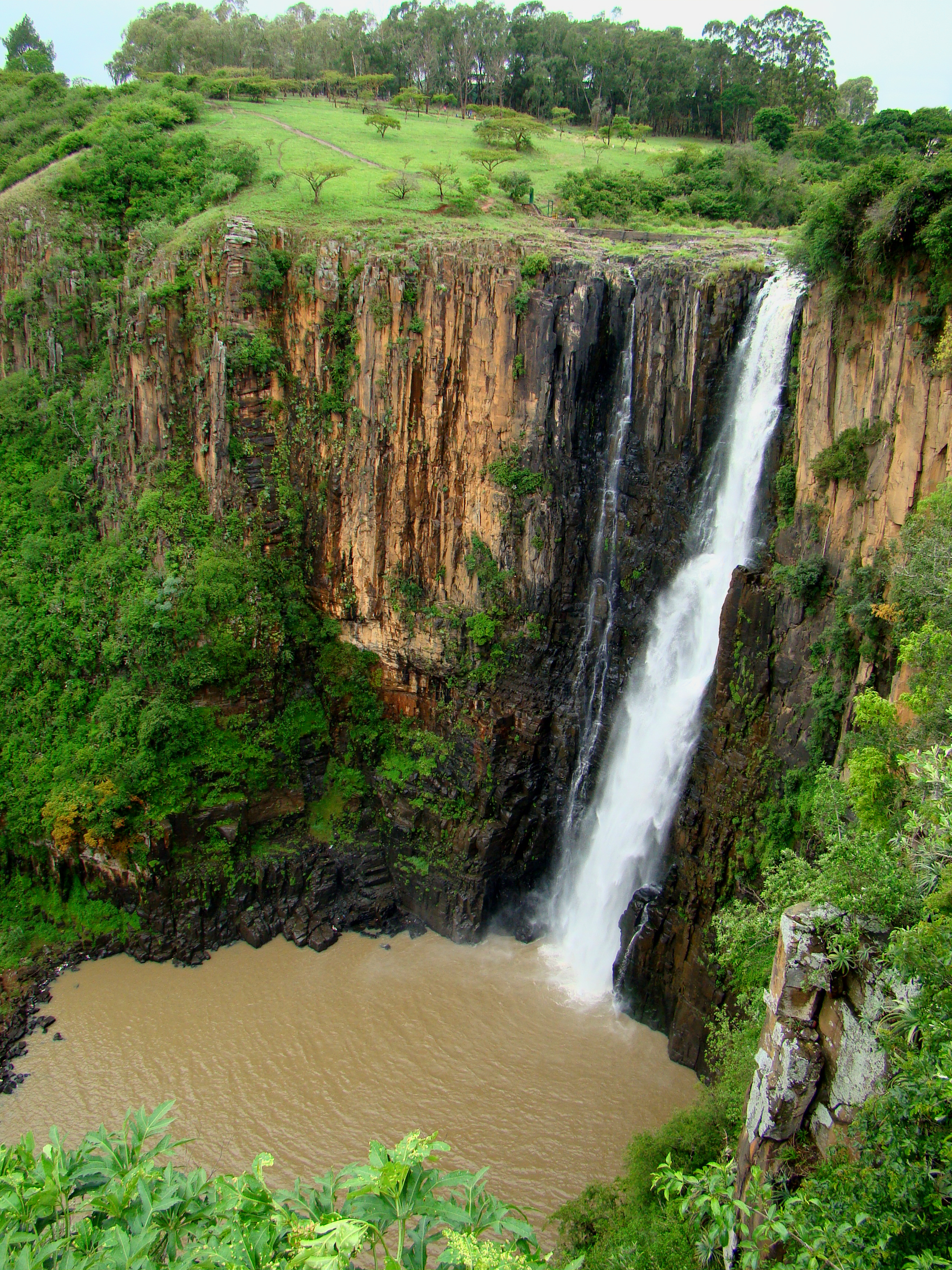
- Howick Falls in November 2009
- Interactive map of Howick Falls
- Location: Howick, KwaZulu-Natal, South Africa
- Coordinates: 29°29′12″S 30°14′20″E
- Total height: 364 feet (111 m)
- Number of drops: 1
- Watercourse: Umgeni River

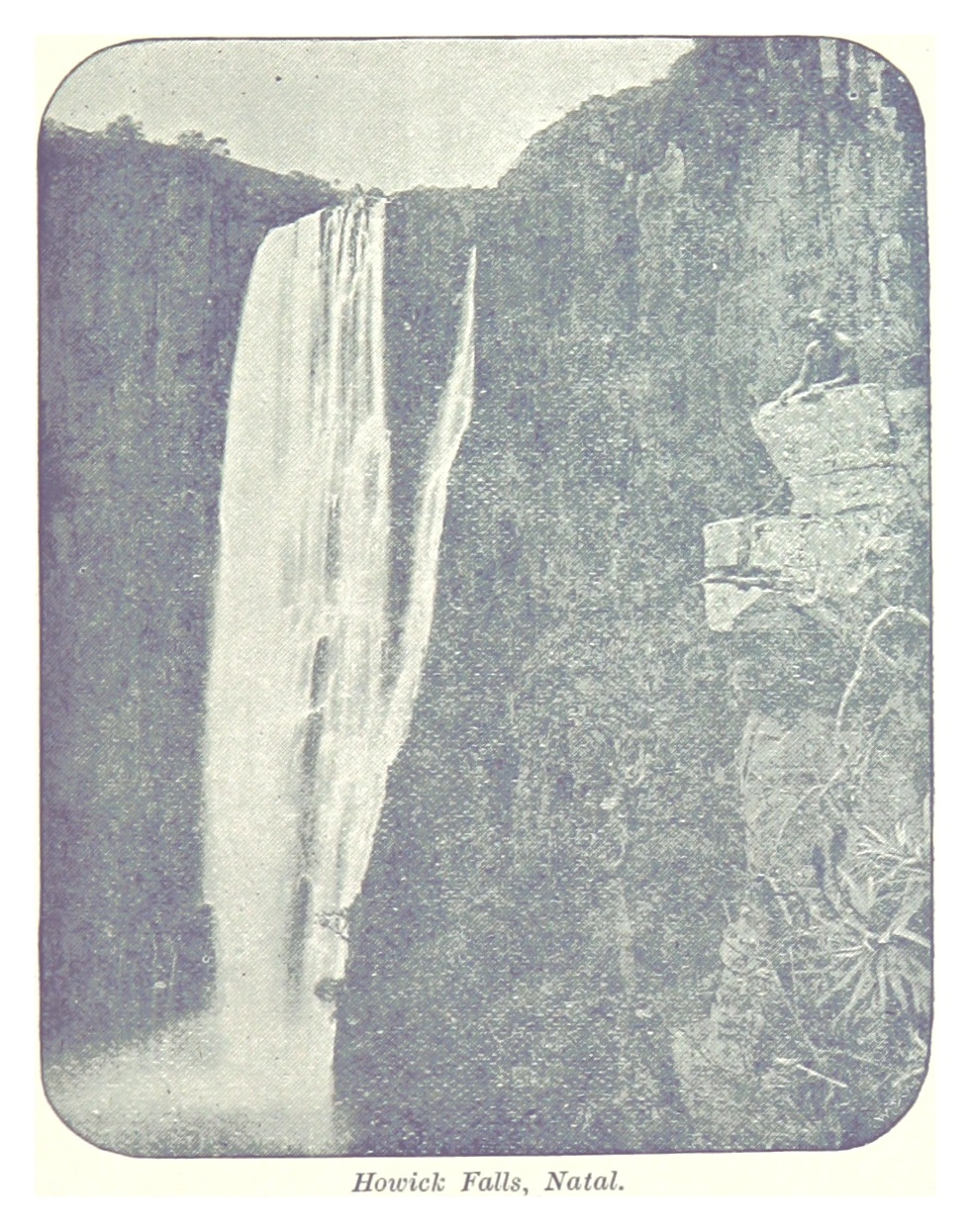
A photo of Howick Falls (1896)

Howick Falls is a waterfall in Howick, KwaZulu-Natal Province, South Africa. The waterfall is approximately 95 m in height (310 feet) and lies on the Umgeni River. The Zulu people called the falls KwaNogqaza, which means "Place of the Tall One".

== Identified geographical feature ==
The KwaZulu-Natal province has known human occupation for well over 30,000 years and KwaNogqaza was a well known site prior to any western influence, given the rich legend surrounding the area.

== Human interaction ==
Many people have been swept over the falls, especially in the pioneer days of the province, as some settlers thought the easiest place to cross the river was just above the falls. There have been a recorded 40 deaths surrounding Howick Falls with the first recorded death occurring in 1851. Most of these have been recorded as suicides but accidents and murder have also been known to happen, contributing to, if not maintaining, the local legendary status of the waterfall. In 1999, Jeb Corliss had a near-fatal BASE jump into the waterfalls where his chute opening went asymmetric and he could not avoid flying into the downpouring water.

== Myth and folklore ==
According to local legend, the pool at the bottom of the falls is the residence of the Inkanyamba, a giant eel-like serpent or dragon. According to lore only sangomas can safely approach the falls and then only to offer prayers and other acts of worship to the inkanyamba, ancestral spirits and the 'Great God'.

== Tourism ==
Despite, or perhaps because of, its chequered history, kwaNogqaza has become a principal tourist attraction for the KwaZulu-Natal midlands.

== See also ==
- List of waterfalls
- List of waterfalls in South Africa
- Mgeni River
- Howick, KwaZulu-Natal
