= Marco Cianfanelli =

South African artist (born 1970)

- Born: 30 November 1970 (age 55); Johannesburg, South Africa
- Awards: 2001 ABSA Atelier Merit Award; 2002 ABSA Atelier Award; 2004 Major Award, Brett Kebble Art Awards

Marco Cianfanelli (born 30 November 1970) is a South African artist who has been involved in a wide range of projects involving art, architecture and public spaces. Cianfanelli combines computer-generated, data-driven applications with human, expressive, gestural acts to create tension in his work. Cianfanelli is one of a handful of South African artists whose work successfully spans the public and domestic sphere. He began his career painting landscapes and continues to be concerned with romanticized space and that which is marginalized through the very act of romanticizing. Cianfanelli's slick, pared-down, iconographic recent works are intricately linked with the complexity of loving South Africa.

One of Cianfanelli's most recognisable works is the depiction of Nelson Mandela's head that is located at the site of Mandela's capture in Howick, South Africa.This work is called Release.

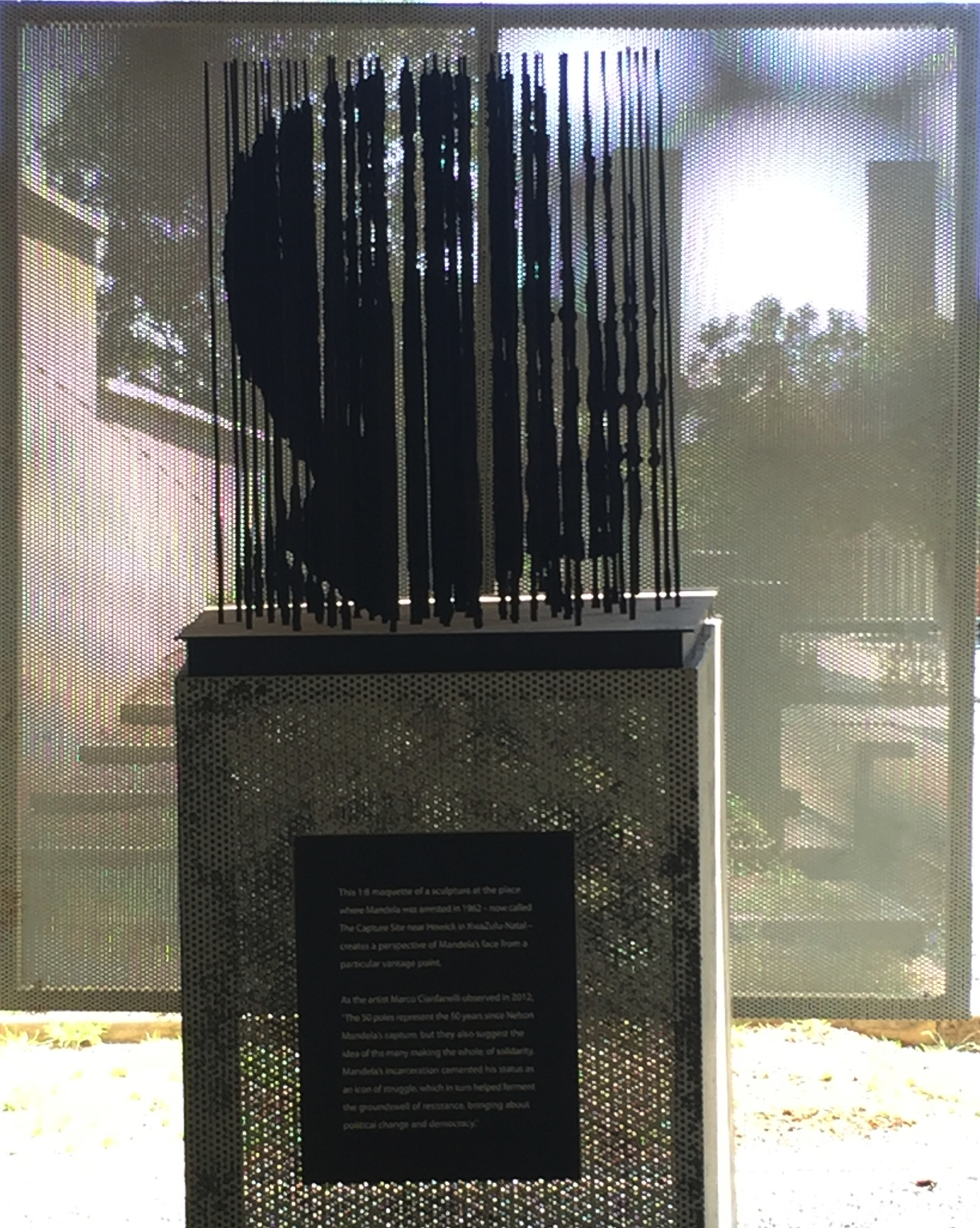
Replica of Nelson Mandela Artwork at Apartheid Museum by Marco Cianfanelli

== Career ==
=== Education ===
In 1992, Cianfanelli received his BA/FA (painting) from the University of the Witwatersrand.

=== Exhibitions ===
- 2012 University of Johannesburg, Johannesburg, South Africa
- 2011 SA’ s first Annual International Land Art Event/ Plettenberg Bay
- 2009 Absent Fields, Goodman Gallery, Johannesburg, South Africa
- 2009 Contemporary sculpture in the landscape / Nirox Foundation; Johannesburg
- 2008 Intervention, UNISA Art Gallery, Tswane
- 2008 Production Marks, Grahamstown Festival, KZNSA Gallery, The Goethe Institute
- 2008 Heptad, The Art Space, Johannesburg
- 2007 Spier Contemporary, Stellenbosch, Cape Town
- 2007 Positive, Sun City
- 2007 Aardklop 10, Potchefstroom
- 2006 Projected Development: return to begin, Aardklop Festival artist, Potchefstroom
- 2005 Projected Development, Gallery Momo, Johannesburg
- 2004 Brett Kebble Art Awards, Cape Town
- 2003 ABSA Gallery, Johannesburg
- 2002 Once were Painters, KKNK, Oudtshoorn.
- 2001 We Love our customers, Hungarian Embassy, New York
- 2000 Tour-guides of the inner city – URBAN FUTURES Rembrandt van Rijn Gallery, Johannesburg
- 2000 Hoerikwaggo, South African National Gallery, Cape Town
- 2000 SASOL New Signatures Revisited, Klein Karoo National Arts Festival, Oudtshoorn
- 2000 Emotions and Relations, Sandton civic Art Gallery, Johannesburg
- 1999 Channel, Association for Visual Arts, Cape Town
- 2002 Joint exhibition with Stephanus Rademeyer, The Art Space, Johannesburg
- 1998 Atlantis, Mark Coetzee Fine Art Cabinet, Cape Town
- 1998 ! Xoe – Site Specific, Nieu-Bethesda, Eastern Cape
- 1997 Taking Stock, Co-curated and exhibited, Johannesburg Stock Exchange, Johannesburg
- 1997 Cyst: Works in Paint, Good Hope Gallery, The Castle, Cape Town
- 1997 No. 4, Hillbrow Fort, Johannesburg
- 1996 Record, Art Space, Newtown Cultural Precinct, Johannesburg

=== Collections ===
- SASOL
- ABSA
- DIADATA
- Bloemfontein Art Museum
