= Lidgetton =

- Location within KwaZulu-Natal Location within South Africa
- Coordinates: 29.441°S 30.101°E
- Country: South Africa
- Province: KwaZulu-Natal
- District: uMgungundlovu
- Municipality: uMngeni

Area
  - Total: 7.99 km^{2} (3.08 sq mi)

Population (2011)
  - Total: 4,521
  - Density: 566/km^{2} (1,470/sq mi)

Racial makeup (2011)
  - Black African: 95.8%
  - Coloured: 0.7%
  - Indian/Asian: 0.7%
  - White: 2.5%
  - Other: 0.2%

First languages (2011)
  - Zulu: 73.7%
  - Sotho: 16.5%
  - English: 4.3%
  - Xhosa: 1.2%
  - Other: 4.3%
- Time zone: UTC+2 (SAST)
- PO box: 3270
- Area code: 033

Lidgetton is a town in uMngeni Local Municipality in the KwaZulu-Natal province of South Africa.
