= Wagendrift Nature Reserve =

Protected area in South Africa

- IUCN category IV (habitat/species management area)
- Interactive map of Wagendrift Nature Reserve
- Location: Estcourt, KwaZulu-Natal, South Africa
- Nearest city: Estcourt
- Coordinates: 29°02′30″S 29°51′15″E
- Area: 980 ha (2,400 acres)
- Established: 1963
- Governing body: Ezemvelo KZN Wildlife

Wagendrift Nature Reserve is a 980-hectare (2,400-acre) protected area situated around the Wagendrift Dam on the Bushmans River, approximately 5 km (3.1 mi) west of Estcourt in the KwaZulu-Natal Midlands, South Africa. Managed by Ezemvelo KZN Wildlife, the reserve preserves a combination of highland aquatic habitats and significant archaeological sites.

== Geography and hydrology ==
The reserve surrounds the Wagendrift Dam, which was completed in 1963 to regulate the flow of the Bushmans River for irrigation and industrial use in Estcourt. The Bushmans River is a major tributary of the Tugela River, originating in the Drakensberg mountains. The landscape is characterized by dolerite ridges and undulating Southern Tall Grassland.

== History and archaeology ==
The name "Wagendrift" (Afrikaans: "Wagon Ford") originates from a historical river crossing used by transport wagons on the route between the port of Durban and the interior during the 19th century.

=== Moor Park Iron Age site ===
The reserve contains the Moor Park archaeological site, which is of significant academic interest for South African Iron Age studies.

- Settlement Pattern: Excavations revealed stone-walled enclosures situated on defensive hilltops, dating back to the late 14th century.
- Cultural Significance: The site represents a transition in settlement architecture among early agro-pastoralist communities in the KwaZulu-Natal Midlands, highlighting a period of increased social conflict and the need for defensive livestock kraals.

== Biodiversity ==
=== Flora ===
The vegetation consists primarily of Acacia-dominated thornveld and mistbelt grasslands. Common tree species include the Sweetthorn (Vachellia karroo) and Paperbark thorn (Vachellia sieberiana).

=== Fauna ===
- Mammals: The reserve supports populations of Eland, Zebra, Black wildebeest, Blesbok, and Mountain reedbuck.
- Avifauna: Over 180 bird species have been recorded. The dam serves as an important habitat for waterfowl and a breeding ground for the African fish eagle.
- Ichthyofauna: The dam is an established fishery for Largemouth bass, Carp, and Bluegill.

== Tourism ==
Wagendrift is a major regional center for recreation:

- Water Sports: The dam is utilized for boating, windsurfing, and canoeing.
- Trails: A 3.5 km self-guided trail circles the dam and provides access to the Moor Park archaeological site.
- Accommodation: Facilities include a campsite with 37 stands and several self-catering chalets.
