= Estcourt =

Estcourt Umtshezi
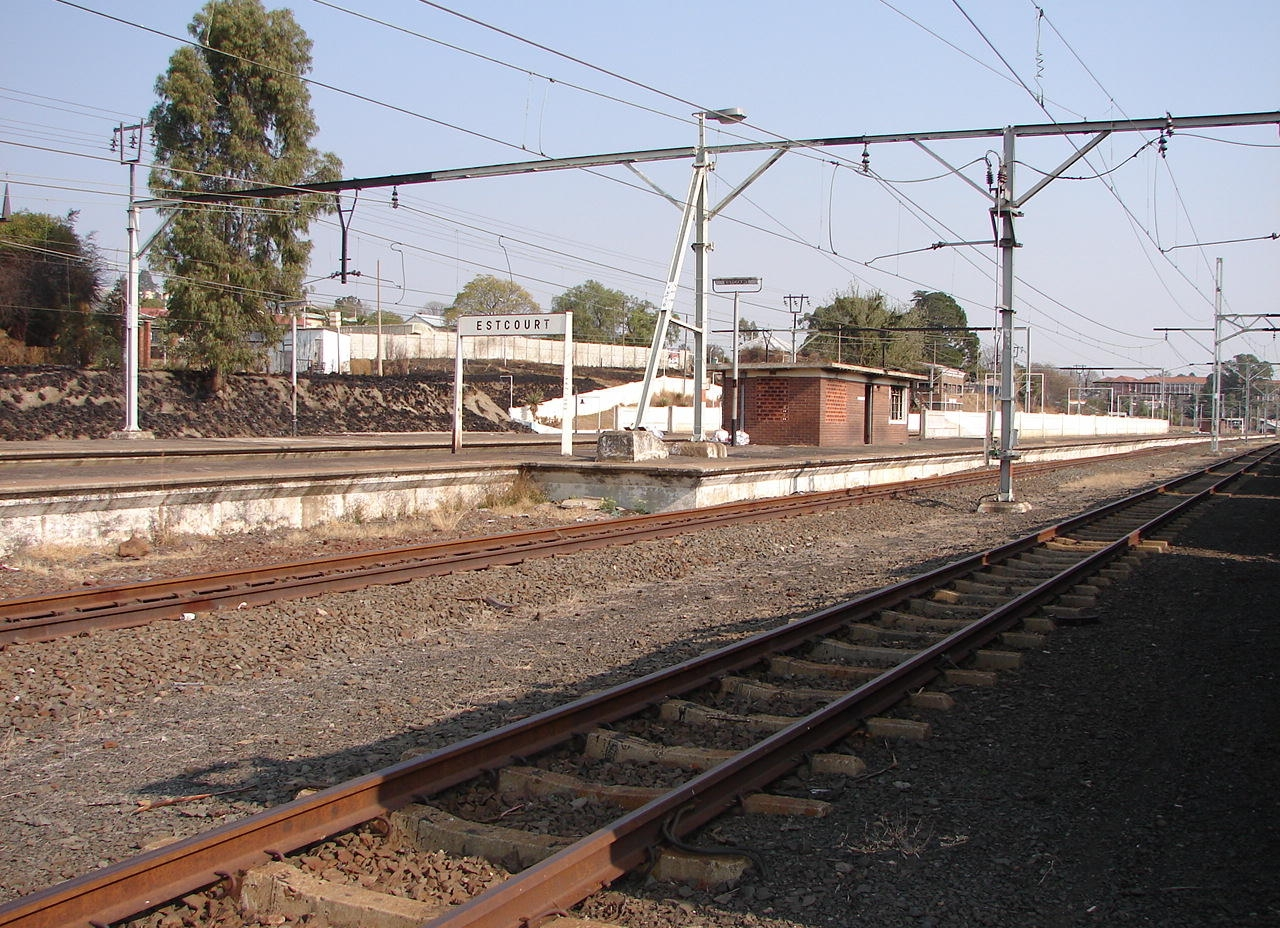
- Estcourt railway station

- Location within KwaZulu-Natal Location within South Africa Location within Africa
- Coordinates: 29°00′00″S 29°53′00″E
- Country: South Africa
- Province: KwaZulu-Natal
- District: Uthukela
- Municipality: Inkosi Langalibalele
- Established: 1848

Area
  - Total: 60.74 km^{2} (23.45 sq mi)
- Elevation: 1,196 m (3,924 ft)

Population (2011)
  - Total: 22,071
  - Density: 363.4/km^{2} (941.1/sq mi)

Racial makeup (2011)
  - Black African: 68.8%
  - Coloured: 4.4%
  - Indian/Asian: 20.5%
  - White: 5.3%
  - Other: 1.0%

First languages (2011)
  - Zulu: 60.9%
  - English: 31.9%
  - Afrikaans: 2.4%
  - S. Ndebele: 1.1%
  - Other: 3.7%
- Time zone: UTC+2 (SAST)
- Postal code (street): 3310
- PO box: 3310
- Area code: 036

Estcourt (/ˈɛskɔːrt/ ESS-kort) is a town in the uThukela District of KwaZulu-Natal Province, South Africa. The main economic activity is farming with large bacon and processed food factories situated around the town. The N3 freeway passes close to the town, linking it to the rest of South Africa.

== Location ==
Estcourt is located at the confluence of the Bushmans and the Little Bushmans River. It is also on the main Durban - Johannesburg railway line some 160 km north of Durban and 25 km south of the Tugela River crossing. In earlier years the main road, later to become the N3, passed through the town. The town itself is 1196 m above sea level and lies in the hilly country that dominates most of the Natal Midlands. The Drakensberg lies some 41 km to the west of the town.

== 19th century ==
The earliest identifiable inhabitants of the Estcourt area were the San, a hunter-gather people, though rock engravings dating from four different Iron Age periods have been found on the farm Hattingsvlakte. The San had been displaced by the Bantu people, a pastoral people and in particular the Zulu, a tribe that traced its origins as a separate nation to the early eighteenth century. The San had sought sanctuary in the foothills of the Drakensberg. In the early nineteenth century the Zulu king Shaka used the Mfecane to build his empire, which led to a depopulation of the area. Thus, when the white settlers first arrived in the Estcourt area, the land appeared to be almost uninhabited.

=== The first settlers ===
The first recorded settlement in the Estcourt area was in 1838 when a group of Voortrekkers encamped on the banks of the Bushmans River in anticipation of securing land right from Dingane kaSenzangakhona, the Zulu king. The negotiator, Piet Retief, and his party were murdered by Dingane on 6 February 1838 and on 17 February attacks, since known as the Weenen massacre, were launched on the Voortrekker encampments along the Bloukrans River, the Bushmans River and the Mooi River. After a Voortrekker retaliation at the Battle of Blood River, Dingane was deposed and his place taken by Mpande. Mpande seceded the land south of the Tugela River to the settlers which included the area that was to become Estcourt. The Voortrekkers set up the Natalia Republic, but after the Battle of Congella in 1842, they abandoned their settlements and moved into the interior, leaving Natalia to the British who established the Colony of Natal. Thus Natal acquired an English-speaking rather than an Afrikaans-speaking settler community and Estcourt, being so close to the Tugela River become a frontier outpost.

In 1847 Clem Heeley was the owner of an inn and trading store at a ford on the Bushman's River. On 4 December that year a military post known as Bushman's River Post was established on a hill dominating the ford, whilst at the same time a village known as Bushman's River was established across the river. On 4 January 1848 the Surveyor General recommended that the seat for the new magisterial district of Impofane be located at Bushmans River Drift. Initially the recommendation was ignored and the magistracy was located at Weenen, some 30 km away but in 1859, with the growing importance of Estcourt, the seat was moved there.

=== The Byrne settlers and the name "Estcourt" ===
The settler community was further strengthened by the arrival of the Byrne Settlers - English immigrants whose settlement in the Colony was sponsored by Thomas Estcourt, a North Wiltshire, MP. In 1946 there appears have been conflicting suggestions of why the town was called "Estcourt" - one body of opinion favouring the view that the town was named after Captain Estcourt, a member of the party who established the military outpost in 1847 and the other favouring the view that the town was named after Thomas Estcourt MP in 1863. Pearce, after extensive research which was backed up by the Ralfe family legend, supported the latter view which is now the accepted view.

=== The settlement grows ===
In 1872 an Anglican church was built on the banks of the Bushman's River, and Fort Durnford was built in 1874 by Lt-Col Anthony Durnford, Royal Engineers, as a base for the Natal Mounted Police. The fort became a substantial stronghold, and was used to protect transport riders and the herds of cattle driven across the ford. It is as secure as any castle with drinking water tanks in the basement, a drawbridge, moat and two secret tunnels.

The confirmation of large deposits of coal in the Dundee area in 1880, some 100 km north of Estcourt led to the building of a railway line to link the coalfields with Durban. In 1885 the railway reached Estcourt and a bridge that is still in use today was built across the Bushman's River. The completion of the line to the coalfields the following year provided Estcourt with a good communications link to the coast.

After a number of attempts to establish private schools had failed due to lack of support, the town's first government school, the Estcourt Government School was established in 1886 with an initial role of 45 children. In accordance with the prevailing colonial policy, the school only admitted pupils of European descent.

In 1895, the traveller Ingram described Estcourt as having " ... buildings [that] are strong and substantial, being for the most part constructed of hewn stone. A fort crowns the hill to the southward. There are in the town three churches, four hotels, and at the station a railway bar, A commodious sanatorium in connection with the Roman Catholic Mission has recently been established near the town. The population is put down at about 300 residents, though on market days, quite a large throng of farmers are to be met in its streets."

The mission station itself had been opened in 1892 - the second Augustinian Sisters establishment in Natal staffed mainly by French-speaking nuns from Canada and France. The mission had a school, sanatorium and a chapel for the Roman Catholic families in the town. The sanatorium was well used during the period when the railway line was being constructed and during the Boer War. Due to an economic depression after the war the school was unable to survive and the sanatorium had to complete with a nursing home that was run by one of the two doctors in the town. Changing attitudes after Vatican II and the opening of hospitals run by the Provincial Departments contributed to the order closing its mission and the sanatorium in Estcourt in the late 1960s.

In 1899, when he arrived at Estcourt as a war correspondent, Churchill described the town as "a South African town—that is to say, it is a collection of about three hundred detached stone or corrugated iron houses, nearly all one-storied, arranged along two broad streets—for space is plentiful—or straggling away towards the country".

=== Second Boer War ===
When the Second Boer War broke out on 11 October 1899, the Boer forces had 21,000 men ready to invade the Colony of Natal. Ranged against them, the British had 13,000 men. The Boers under the command of General Petrus Joubert crossed the border into the Natal Colony and rapidly advanced to the Tugela river, laying siege to Ladysmith, some 40 km north of the river and entrapping some 8,000 British regulars. Estcourt effectively became the front and this is where General Sir Redvers Buller first established his Natal headquarters and where Winston Churchill, then a war correspondent based himself. On 15 November a raiding party ambushed an armoured train at Frere, 20 km north of Estcourt taking 70 prisoners including Churchill. After another raiding party was surprised on 23 November at Willow Grange, 10 km to the south of Estcourt, the Boers withdrew to a position behind the Tugela River. British reinforcements arrived and once Ladysmith was relieved on 1 March 1900, formal Boer opposition melted away and the colony was secured.

== 20th century ==
As the twentieth century dawned, Estcourt's position as a communications hub was enhanced by the building of the Estcourt - Weenen railway line in 1907 to enable agricultural produce from Weenen to reach the main cities. (This line was closed in 1983).

=== Municipal development ===
Estcourt became a municipality in 1914. The Augustinian Order of Natal, having been present in the town since the 1890s built a chapel in 1929.

In the last census of the century, taken in 1991, the population of Esctourt was recorded as being approximately 3 407 whites, 710 coloureds, 5 432 Asians and 1 296 blacks.

=== Industrial development ===
During the twentieth century, Estcourt developed from being a market town serving the local farming community to one in which the products from the farming community were used in the manufacture of consumer products.

At some time close to the start of the twentieth century, Joseph Baynes, a Byrne settler and dairy industry pioneer, established a milk processing plant in Estcourt under the name of the Natal Creamery Ltd. This factory was located adjacent to the railway station. Baynes died in 1925 and in 1927 the factory, which by this time was owned by South African Condensed Milk Ltd. was bought by Nestlé. Today the factory produces Coffee, MILO and NESQUIK.

In August 1917 the Farmer's Co-operative Bacon Factory Limited was founded and the building of the factory commenced. The factory was opened on 6 June 1918 by the Prime Minister General Louis Botha and marketed its products under the brand name Eskort. In August 1920, the company secured the services of Mr. H.W. Lambert of Scotland as 'sausage maker', thereby starting a tradition for quality sausages whose reputation has since become world famous. The following year the factory commenced exports to the United Kingdom and during the Second World War supplied over one million tins of sausages to the Allied forces all over the world and over 12 tonnes of bacon weekly to convoys calling at Durban harbour. A sister plant was built in Heidelberg and in 1967 the Eskort brand was the largest processed meat brand in South Africa. In 1998 the company was converted from a cooperative to a limited liability company.

1948 saw the establishment of the Masonite factory in Estcourt. Masonite was a hardboard product developed in the United States in 1924 by William H. Mason. The mill is in Estcourt, but its headquarters are in Durban and uses timber harvested from 21 922 ha of productive commercial plantations owned by the company. The mill currently employs 900 people and chips 600 logs a day.

In 1963 the 58.5 million cubic metre Wagendrift Dam was constructed on the Bushman's River some 2 km upstream from the town of Estcourt. The dam was designed to irrigate 3,000 ha of land that lay upstream from the river's confluence with the Tugela River.

=== Education ===
At the turn of the century, the Estcourt Government School had about 100 children and offered formal education only at primary level, although the occasional bright student was coached at secondary level to enable them to enter university.

By the 1920s the school had expanded to 226 children and in 1924 four children sat the matriculation exam. This sparked a growth in demand for secondary education, and in 1927 the school was split into two - Estcourt Junior School retaining the old school building and Estcourt High School (as the secondary school later became known) moving to Hospital Hill on the outskirts of the town. The new school had a boarding establishment, and soon the boarders outnumbered the day pupils.

After the Second World War, both schools continued to grow and in 1960 a second primary school - Drakensview Primary School - was built to accommodate the overflow from the Estcourt Junior School.

Towards the end of the twentieth century, the Siraatul Haq Islamic School and Madrasah was established to serve the large local Muslim community with a combined educational option, offering both Islamic and a secular academic curriculum. As of 2018, it is the best performing private school in the district.

== Today ==
During the Apartheid era, Esctourt was a predominantly white and Asian town. The nearby Wembezi township was home to a large black population. In 1995 these two areas were incorporated into a transitional local council prior to the setting up of the uMtshezi Municipality. The new council continues to display the old Estcourt coat of arms on its letterheads. In 2008, the estimated population of the uMtshezi Municipality was 57189 blacks, 1726 coloureds, 6155 Asians, and 3244 whites.

== Notable people ==
- Harry William Lambert, the Lambert Park in Estcourt named after him. Mayor of Estcourt 1948/49, arriving in South Africa from Edinburgh Scotland with his wife Jessie in 1920, dedicated his services to developing and manufacturing the Eskort Bacon Factory (the Farmers' Co-operative Bacon Factory) where he introduced the Estcourt pork sausage as well as encouraged quality pig farming.
- Mark Bristow, Chief Executive of Randgold Resources, born in Estcourt
- Henry Honiball - South African Rugby player (1993–1999)
- Capt. James Douglas Mail, AFC, RFC-RAF_SAAF, born 10 July 1892, in Estcourt Pioneer aviator of the early 1920s having flown in World War I with the RFC awarded the AFC while flying in the Palestine Campaign 1917-1918 and KIA in World War II while flying with the SAAF in North Africa
- Charmaine Weavers, born in Estcourt in 1964
- Jack Condon, died in Estcourt in 1967
- Sonia Raciti - Miss South Africa 1998
- Prophet Isaiah Shembe, the founder of the Nazareth Baptist Church, born in Ntabamhlophe, Escourt in the 1860s.
