= Shembe =

Shembe may refer to:

- Isaiah Shembe
- Nazareth Baptist Church
- Shembe, Bururi, a village in Burundi
- Shembe, Rutana, a village in Burundi
- Lungelo Khumbulani Shibzin Jr. Shembe
