= Agterryer =

Afrikaner term for a military role

An Agterryer (lit. 'rear rider') is an Afrikaner term for Indigenous South Africans who volunteered or were conscripted as auxiliaries to fight during various conflicts in South Africa including the Great Trek, the Xhosa Wars, the First Boer War, and the Second Boer War.

== Etymology ==
According to A Dictionary of South African English, the term "agterryer" in the Afrikaans language has its origins in the Dutch word "achter rijder" (lit. 'he who rides behind'). An achter rijder or "after rider" was typically a domestic worker who followed his master while on horseback. Likewise, agterryers were Indigenous or mixed race domestic servants and military aides who rendered assistance to Boer commandos during times of conflict, often in a non-combatant role, however, in some isolated cases fought in combat.

== Role in various conflicts ==
Although originally intended as domestic servants, agterryers had a wide range of roles in the Boer commando system. Agterryers often served as cooks, saddlers, personal servants, or took care of horses while a commando engaged in combat. A single agterryer was usually attached to a group of five or more Boers in a commando, it is surmised by South African historians Fransjohan Pretorius that some commandos had between 9,000 and 11,000 agterryers in a single commando while deployed on duty. According to Pretorius the relationship between an agterryer and Boers were often based on paternalism. South African historian Bill Nasson argues however that these relationships were more so based on comradery as they often shared the same food and sleeping quarters.

One of the first notable uses of agterryers was during the Great Trek when a combination of 30+ agterryers and servants were killed alongside Piet Retief near UMgungundlovu in what was later known as the Piet Retief Delegation massacre.

During the First Boer War agterryers played a critical role, most notably at the Battle of Majuba Hill where several agterryers were noted for taking part in the hill assault alongside Boer commando militiamen. During the Boer Wars between 100 000–120,000 agterryers served on both sides during the course of the conflict.

== Gallery ==
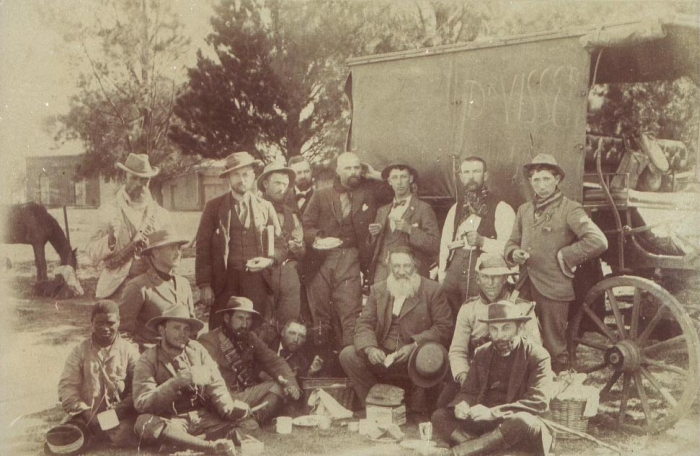
General Piet Joubert, commander of the South African Republic forces with his staff. An agterryer can be seen in the foreground on the far left

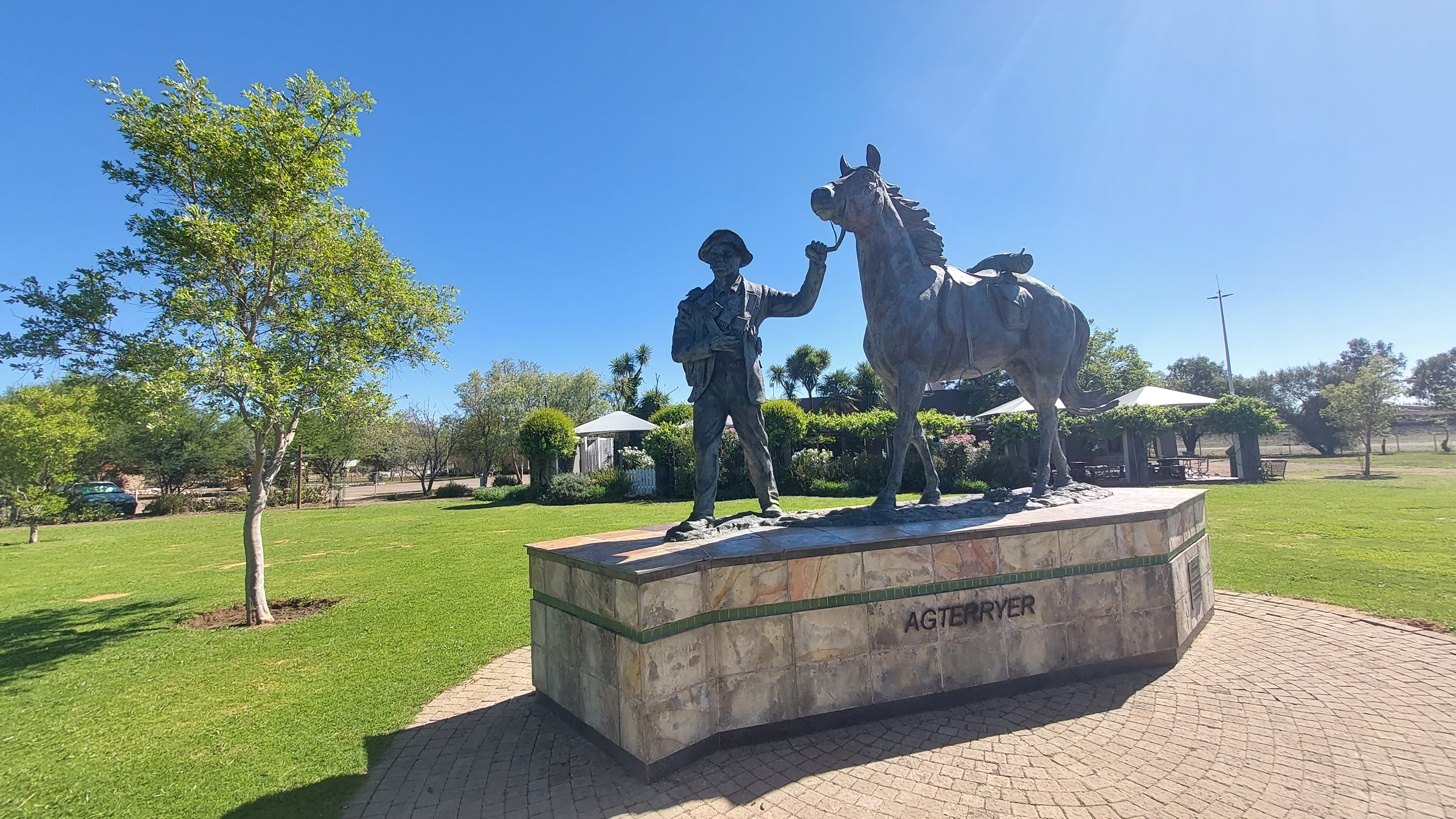
Agterryer statue at the Anglo-Boer War Museum

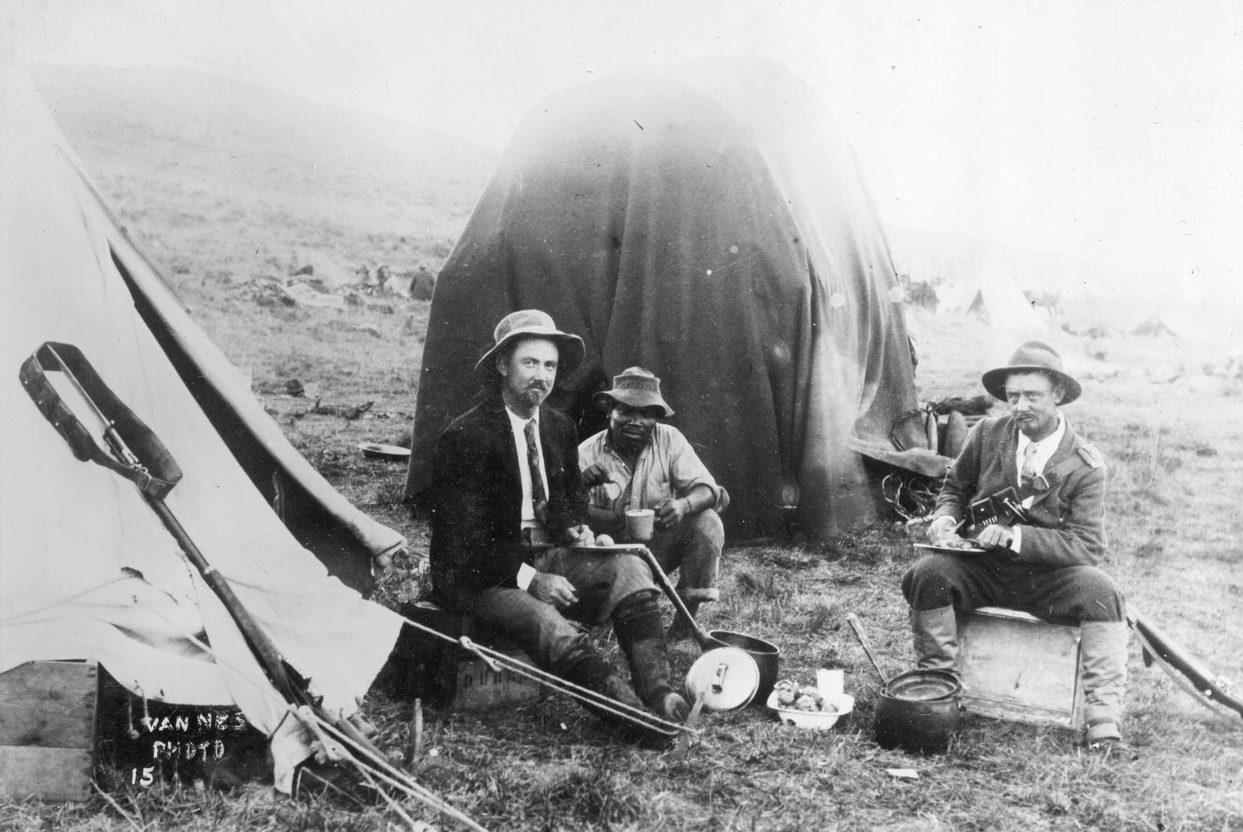
Commandant Louis Wessels of President Martinus Theunis Steyn's bodyguard, his agterryer can be seen next to him

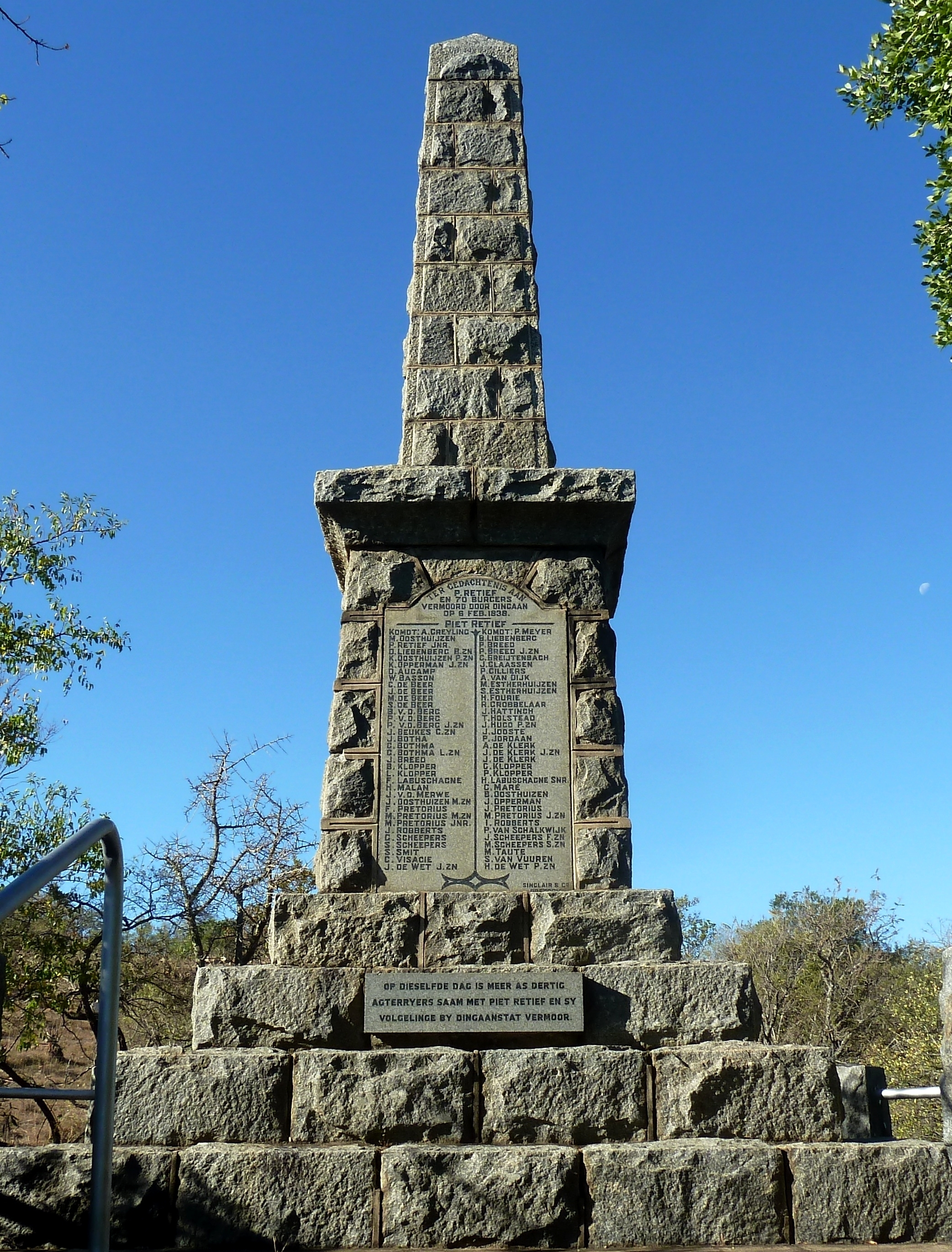
The Moordkoppie Monument which commemorates the Piet Retief Delegation massacre in UMgungundlovu which included several agterryers

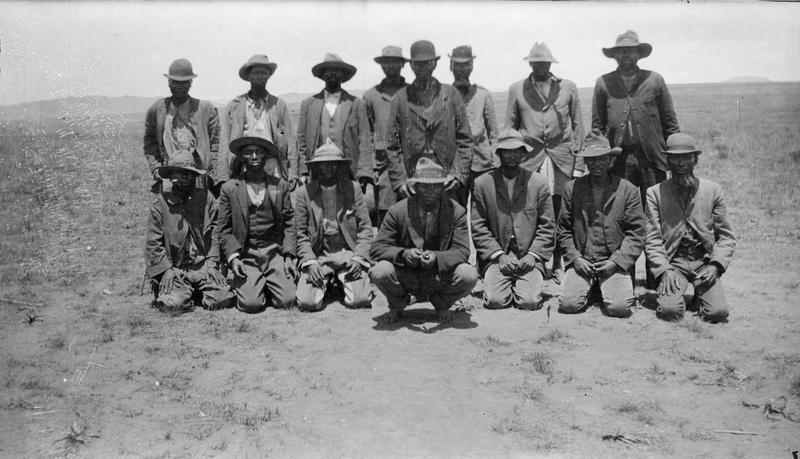
A group of British agterryers during the Second Boer War

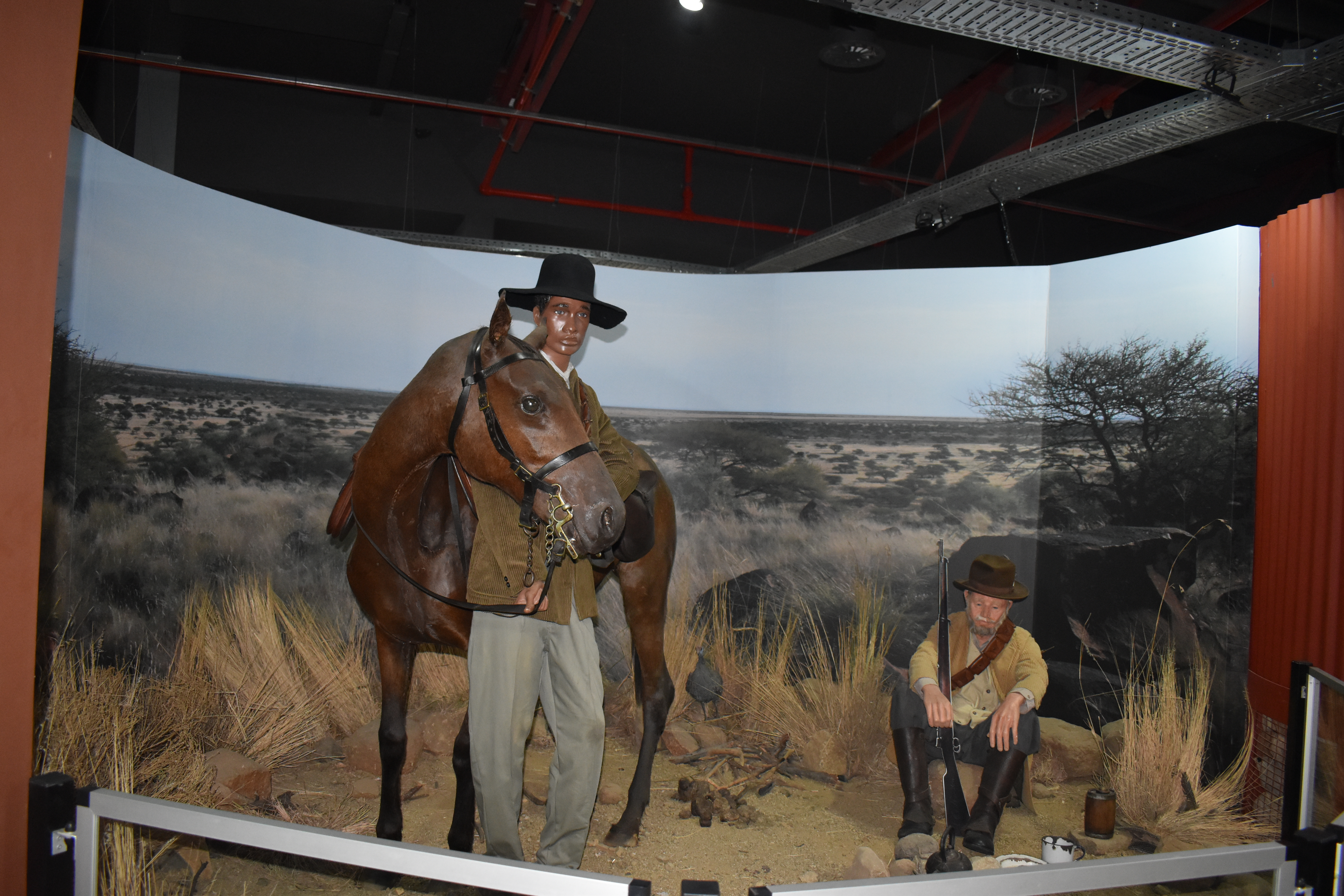
Agterryer exhibit display at the Anglo Boer War museum

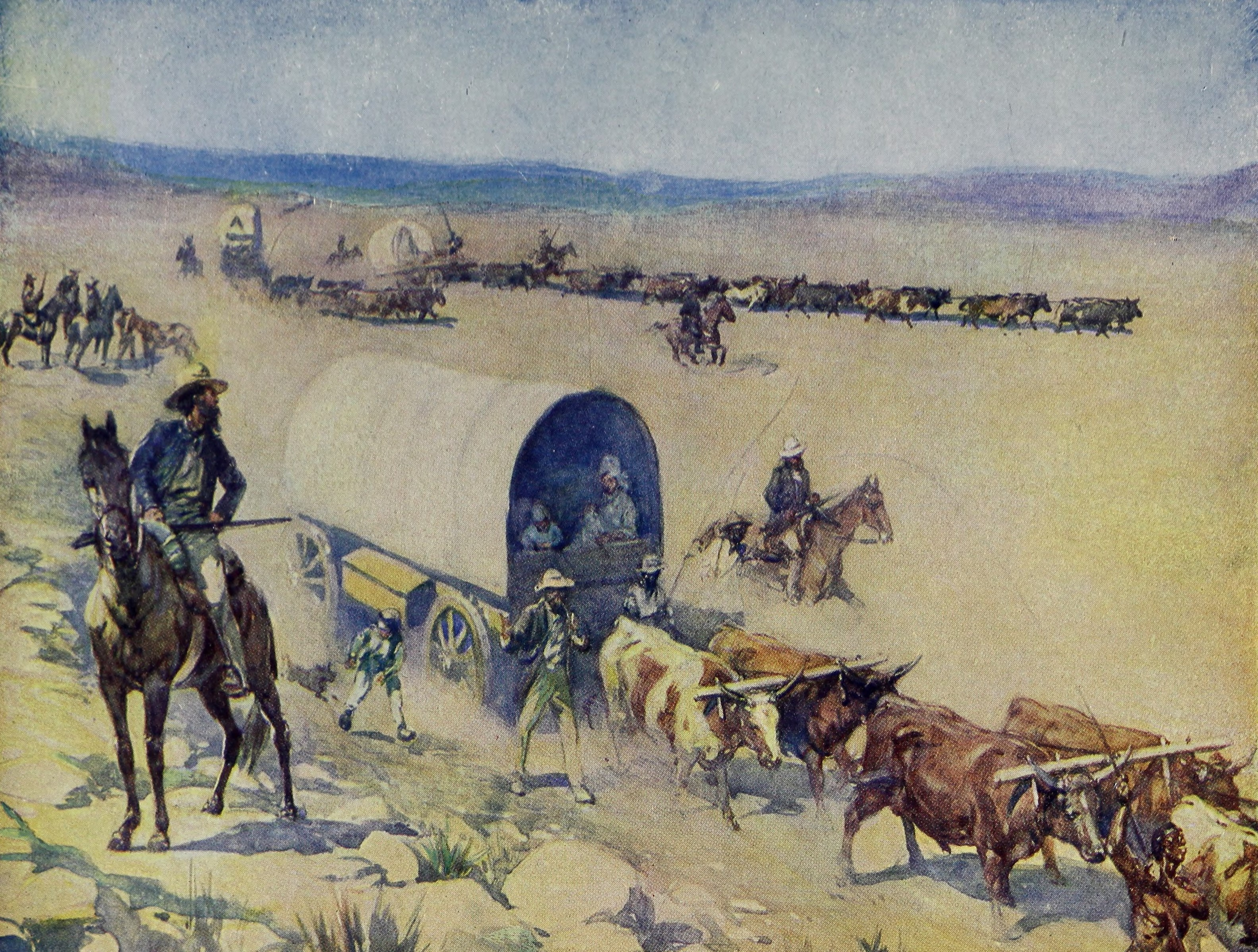
Agterryers driving cattle during the Great Trek

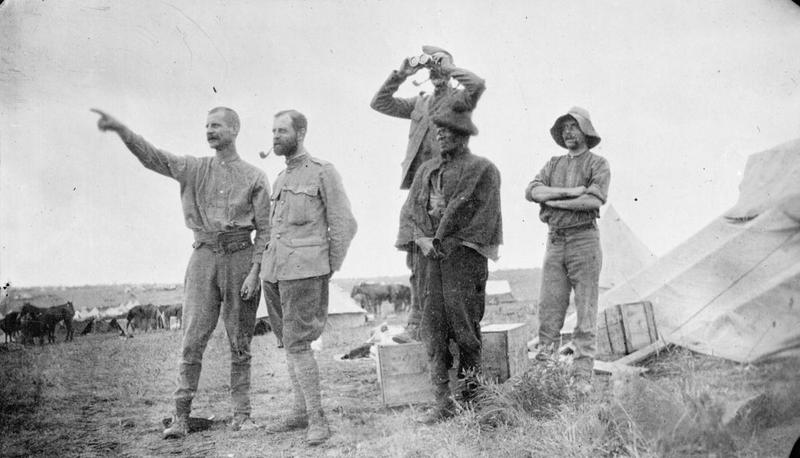
British officers with an agterryer during the Second Boer War
