= Piet Retief Delegation massacre =

1838 Zulu killing of Boers in present-day South Africa

Coordinates: 28°25′37″S 31°16′12″E

- Part of the Great Trek
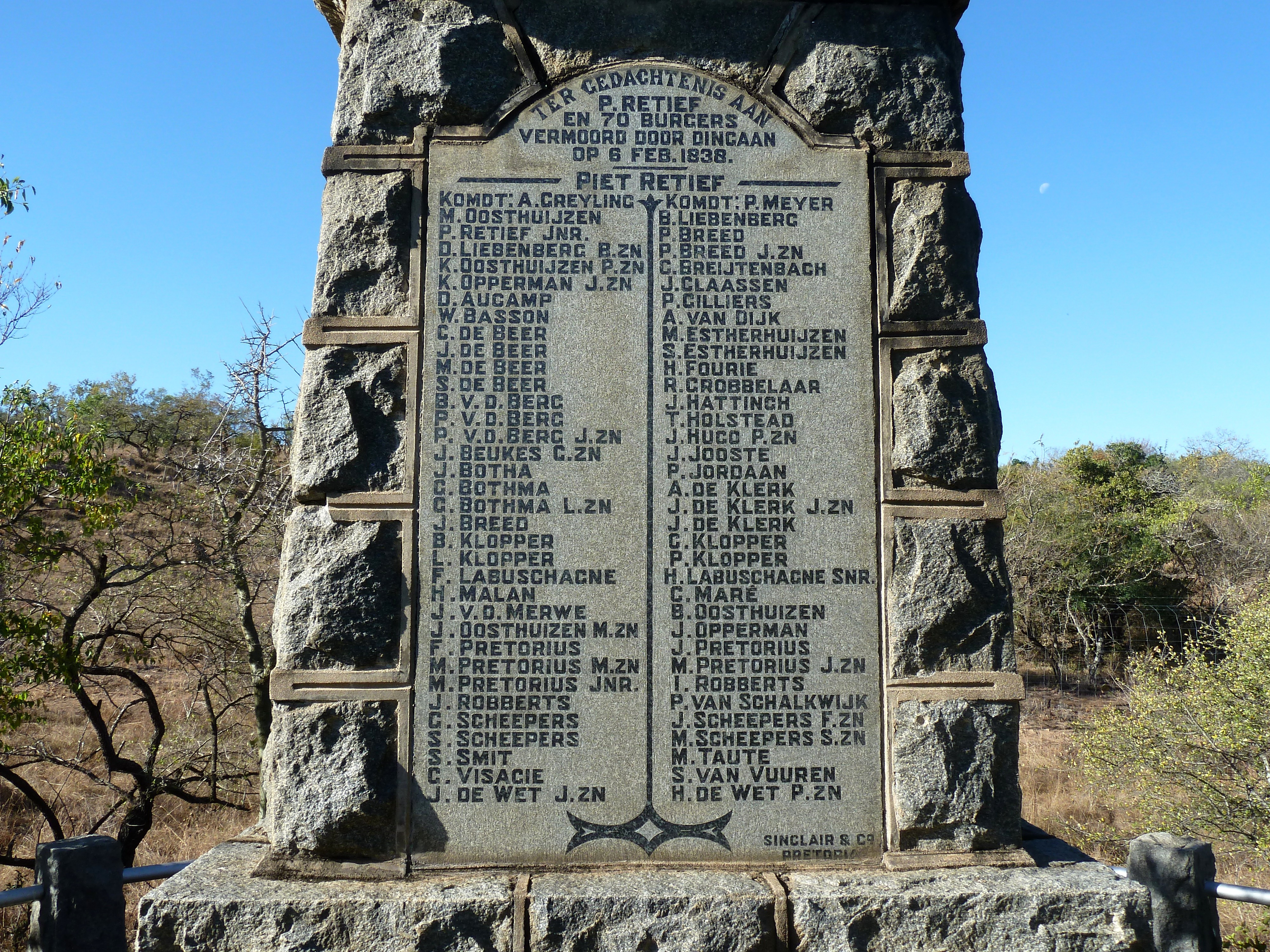
- Memorial to the Piet Retief delegation massacre.
- Location: 28°25'37"S, 31°16'12"E. Hloma mabuto, uMgungundlovu, KwaZulu-Natal province, South Africa, (then the Natalia Republic).
- Date: 6th of february, 1838. (UTC + 2 hours and 4 minutes.)
- Target: Piet Retief's delegation (part of the voortrekkers).
- Attack type: A Mass killing (bashing with bats, stabbing with spears).
- Weapons: Bats, spears.
- Deaths: 100.
- Injuries: Unknown.
- Perpetrator: Impis of Dingane Zulu.

The Piet Retief Delegation massacre was a mass killing of 100 voortrekkers by the Zulu King Dingane in what is now KwaZulu-Natal, South Africa. The voortrekkers, led by Piet Retief who migrated into the region of Natal in 1837 and negotiated a land treaty in February 1838 with King Dingane. Upon realizing the ramifications of the imposed contract, the monarch decided to betray the Voortrekkers, killing the delegation including Piet Retief on 6 February 1838. The land treaty was later found in Piet Retief's possession. It gave the voortrekkers the land between the Tugela River and Port St. Johns. This event eventually led to the Battle of Blood River and the eventual defeat and downfall of King Dingane.

== The Massacre ==
Despite warnings, Retief left the upper Tugela region, 28 January 1838, in the belief that he could negotiate with Dingane for permanent boundaries for the Natal settlement. He eventually met Dingane in Mgungundlovu. He had gotten the impression that Dingane was willing to negotiate but only if Retief returned cattle to him that was stolen by the Batlokwa chief named Sekonyela. Retief eventually was able to find the cattle and brought back a portion of the herd to Dingane. The deed of cession of the Tugela-Umzimvubu region, although dated 4 February 1838 and written by Jan Gerritze Bantjes, (Retief's secretary), was signed by Dingane on 6 February 1838, with the two sides recording three witnesses each. Dingane invited Retief's party to witness a special performance by his soldiers, whereupon King Dingane leaped to his feet and ordered his soldiers to capture Piet Retief's party and their servants.

Piet Retief, his son, men and servants, about 100 people in all were taken to a nearby hillside, Kwa-Matiwane below the Hlomo Amabuto, which means "mustering of the soldiers". The Zulus killed the entire party by clubbing them and killed Retief last so as to make him witness the deaths of his comrades. Their bodies were left on the Kwa-Matiwane hillside to be eaten by vultures and other scavenging animals, as was King Dingane's custom with his enemies.

== The Motives ==
The attack is thought to have been premeditated, and it was unlikely that King Dingane was going to concede the land through the treaty in the first place as he believed the land was divinely inherited, despite the agreement. As for the rationale behind his attack, there are variety of reasons, not just one.

One of the most popular reasons given by historians is that King Dingane felt threatened because he had received news that the voortrekkers that had recently ousted Mzilikazi from the Transvaal region through conquest. The fact that Piet Retief had sent King Dingane letters alluding to the expulsion of Mzilikazi which could easily be interpreted as a veiled threat didn't helped King Dingane as seeing the voortrekkers as trustworthy.

It is likely that he saw Piet Retief and the Boers with him coming into the land as an invasion. He feared that he could possibly share the same fate if he did not take a pre-emptive strike against the voortrekkers. There was also reports that the voortrekkers were encircling the settlement of Mgungundlovu, which was interpreted as being a reconnaissance.

Another reason given is that King Dingane sending Piet Retief and his band out to retrieve the stolen cattle was actually a strategic move to see whether or not Piet Retief could be trusted. According to King Dingane's intelligence officers he did not give back all of the cattle that he had gotten from Sekonyela.

A reason cited by a few scholars is that King Dingane was also promised horses and guns, along with the return of his cattle, when Piet Retief returned to give back King Dingane his cattle he did not give him any guns or horses, despite the promises.

== The Aftermath ==
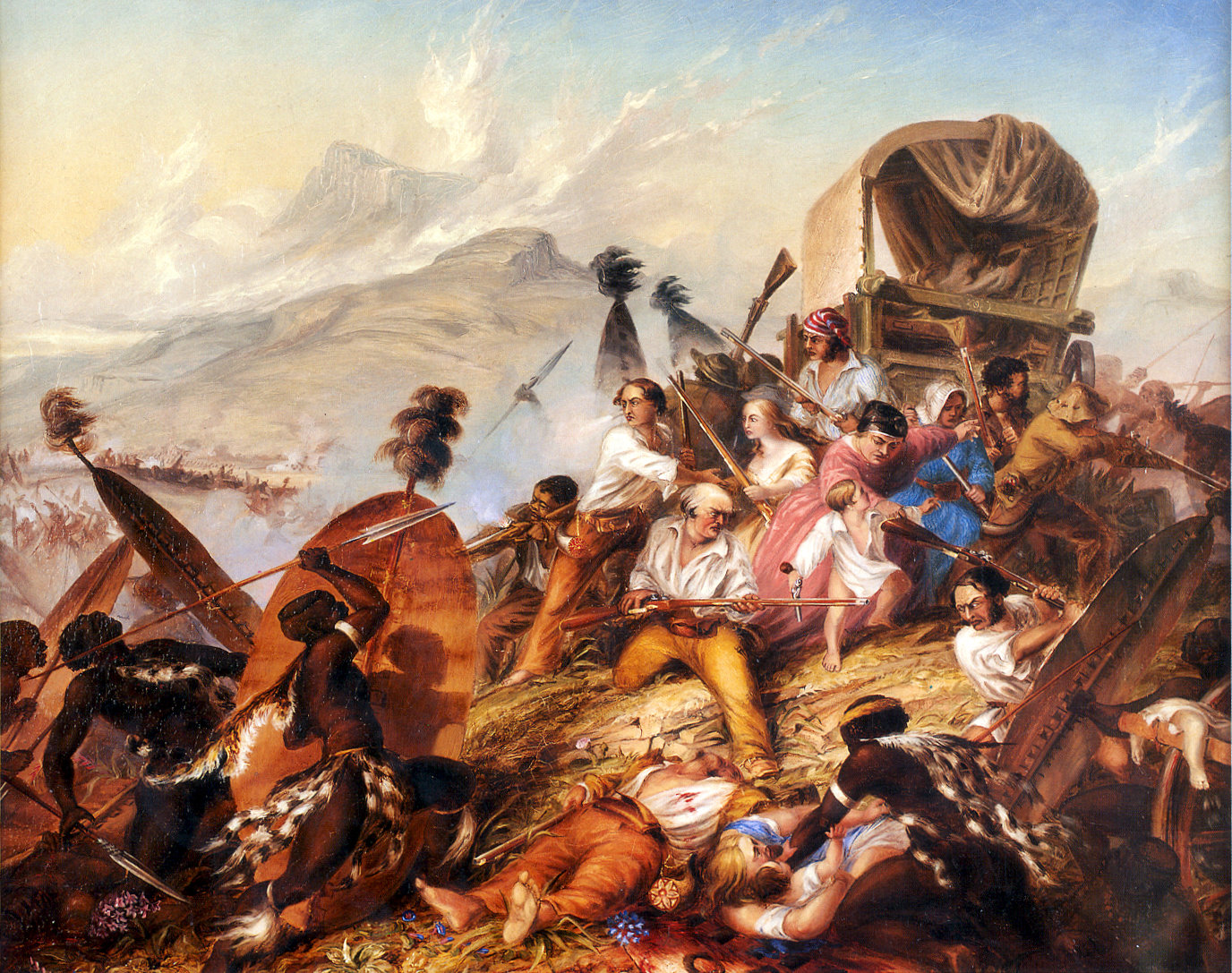
A voortrekker encampment resisting a unexpected attack by an impi of King Dingane, as depicted by Charles Bell

After the incident, King Dingane directed attacks against several unsuspecting voortrekker encampments including the one at Bloukrans. This plunged the Great Trek into a temporary disarray, In total of 534 men, women and children were killed in the Weenen massacre.

Piet Retief's death and the Weenen massacre eventually led to the decisive voortrekker victory at Blood River, after which Andries Pretorius and his "victory commando" recovered the remains of the Piet Retief party. They buried them on 21 December 1838. The 21 year old Jan Bantjes (1817-1887), Piet Retief's former secretary and now Pretorius' secretary, recorded the battle and the entire December campaign in the "Bantjes journal".

Recovered was the undamaged deed, "The cession of Natal" from Piet Retief's leather pouch, also written by Jan Bantjes and later verified by a member of the "victory commando", E.F. Potgieter. The two exact copies of the deed survives, either of which could be the original but the legend has it that the original disappeared during the transiting to the Netherlands during the Anglo-Boer War (1899-1902). The site of the Piet Retief's grave was more or less forgotten until pointed out in 1896 by J.H. Hattingh, a surviving member of Pretorius's "victory commando". A monument recording the names of the members of Piet Retief's delegation was erected near the grave in 1922.

== Other subjects ==
- List of massacres in South Africa
