= Weenen =

- Location within KwaZulu-Natal Location within South Africa
- Coordinates: 28°51′14″S 30°4′21″E
- Country: South Africa
- Province: KwaZulu-Natal
- District: uThukela
- Municipality: Inkosi Langalibalele
- Established: 1839

Area
  - Total: 71.98 km^{2} (27.79 sq mi)

Population (2011)
  - Total: 3,126
  - Density: 43.43/km^{2} (112.5/sq mi)

Racial makeup (2011)
  - Black African: 83.4%
  - Coloured: 2.8%
  - Indian/Asian: 6.4%
  - White: 7.0%
  - Other: 0.4%

First languages (2011)
  - Zulu: 80.4%
  - English: 11.6%
  - Afrikaans: 4.2%
  - S. Ndebele: 1.3%
  - Other: 2.5%
- Time zone: UTC+2 (SAST)
- PO box: 3325
- Area code: 036

Weenen (Dutch for "wept") is the second oldest European settlement in KwaZulu-Natal, South Africa, after Durban. It is situated on the banks of the Bushman River. The farms around the town grow vegetables, lucerne, groundnuts, and citrus fruit.

== History ==
The plots was laid out in 1839 at the site of a massacre by the Zulus following Voortrekker settlements in the area near the royal kraal of Dingane. The Voortrekkers had arrived in the area a year earlier and the town's Dutch name (place of weeping) originates from the massacre of 100 men and women, 185 children and 200 Khoikhoi servants. The settlement was officially surveyed and established in 1841. The Bushman River was bridged by the Jubliee Bridge in 1898. In 1910, it became governed by a local board. A now-closed narrow gauge railway was built in 1907 to connect the town to Estcourt, 47 kilometres to the west until 1983 and provided an outlet for its produce and was thus called the "Cabbage Express'.

=== Weenen Museum ===
The museum (also from 1838) houses a collection of Voortrekker artefacts and was constructed by Voortrekker leader Andries Pretorius whose waterwheel is one of the exhibits. It has previously done service as a magistrate's office, post office and a prison.

== Parks and greenspaces ==
=== Weenen Game Reserve ===
The 6,500 ha game reserve is administered by KZN Wildlife and covers an area of typical inland KwaZulu-Natal acacia grassland with occasional thickets. The reserve offers extensive game viewing facilities, guided walks, environmental education, and three picnic sites. More than 230 species of birds have been recorded (there are two hides overlooking a dam) and the park is a good example of the successful rehabilitation of severely degraded habitat. Mammals in the reserve include rhinoceros, giraffe, hyaena, jackal, bushbuck, reedbuck, steenbok, and porcupine. The game reserve has a small two-bedroom cottage with BBQ facilities and its own trail and waterhole. There are 12 caravan and camping sites and a picnic site. A guided walk of 8 km can be taken, and three self-guided trails which pass dams.

== Sports ==
=== White water rafting ===
The major summer activity is white-water rafting, and the most exciting time to do this is between November and May. The 30 km stretch of river known as the canyon provides some of the most thrilling white water in the country. The South African leg of the Camel White-Water Challenge took place at Zingela in Weenen.

== See also ==
- Weenen massacre
