= Johanna van der Merwe =

Boer Heroine

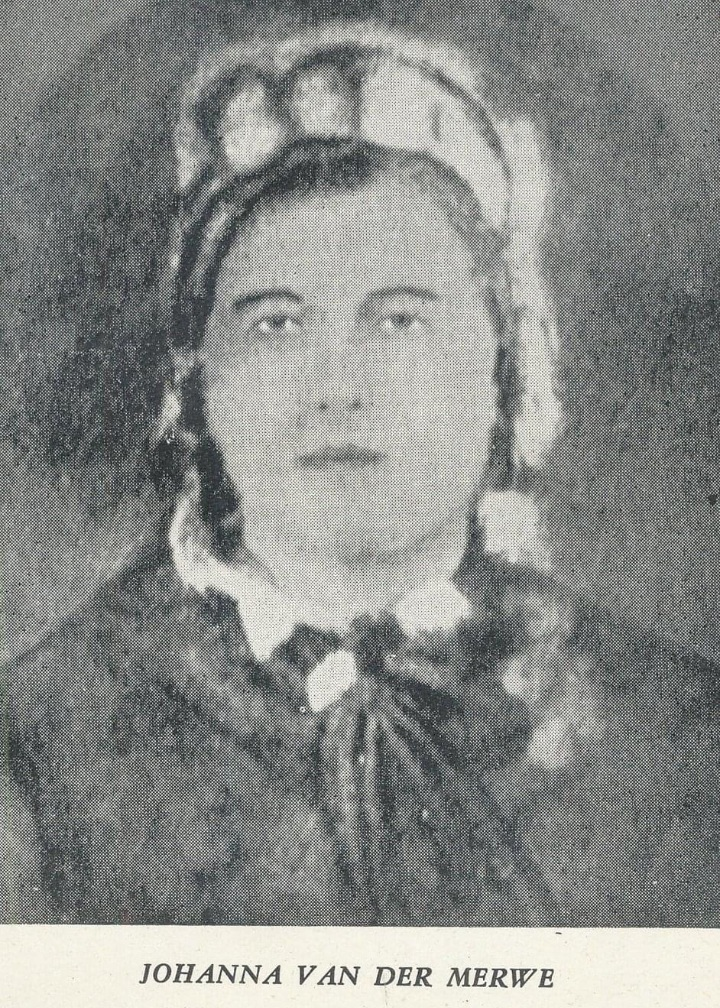
- Johanna Van der Merwe
- Born: 7 March 1825; Grahamstown, Cape Colony
- Died: 15 January 1888 (aged 62); Rouxville, Orange Free State
- Other name: Hannie
- Spouse: Hendrik Frederik Delport (m. 1817) She was born in 1825 but got married in 1817?
- Parents: Johannes Frederik Van der Merwe (father); Helena Catharina Van der Merwe (mother)

Johanna Cornelia van der Merwe (7 March 1825 – 15 January 1888) was a Voortrekker heroine who survived the Weenen massacre, an impi attack on her trekking party on 17 February 1838, despite suffering more than twenty assegai wounds.

She later married Hendrik Frederik Delport with whom she had seven sons (despite being permanently crippled by the attack). She died aged 62 and was buried in Rouxville.

An ox-wagon in the historic 1938 Great Trek Centenary commemoration trek as well as a South African Navy submarine were named in her honour.
