= Weenen battle =

1838 massacre in present-day Weenen, South Africa

- Part of the Great Trek
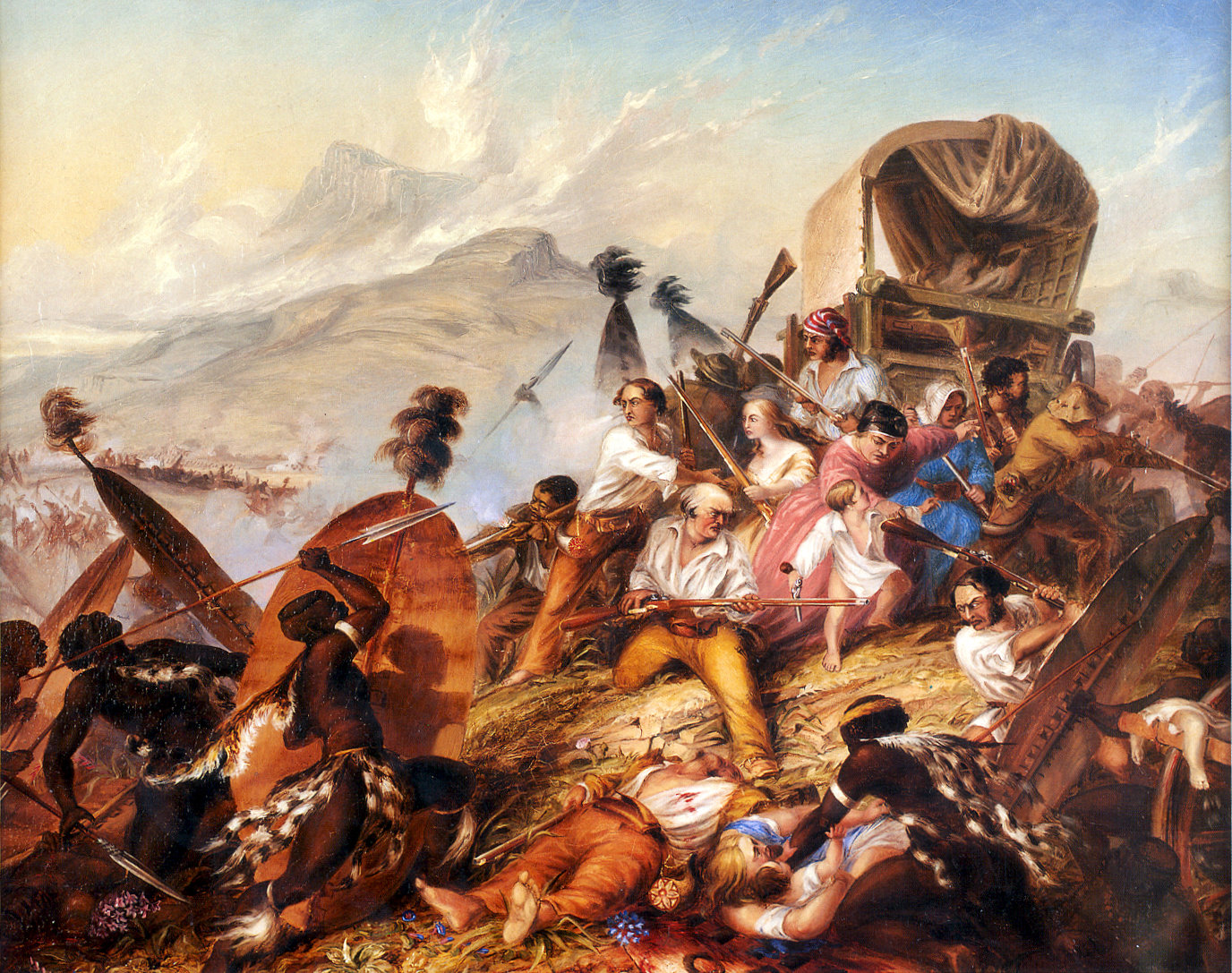
- Depiction of a Zulu attack on a Boer camp in February 1838. The Weenen Massacre was the massacre of Voortrekkers by the Zulu impis.
- Location: Doringkop, Bloukrans River, Moordspruit, Rensburgspruit and other sites around present the day town of Weenen in South Africa
- Date: 17 February 1838
- Deaths: ~282 Voortrekkers and 250 Khoikoi and Basuto
- Injuries: Unknown
- Perpetrator: Impis of Dingane kaSenzangakhona

The Weenen battle (Afrikaans: Bloukransmoorde) was the massacre of Voortrekkers, Khoikhoi and Basuto by the Zulu Kingdom on 17 February 1838. The massacres occurred at Doringkop, Bloukrans River, Moordspruit, Rensburgspruit and other sites around the present day town of Weenen in South Africa's KwaZulu-Natal province.

== Battle ==
After killing Piet Retief and about 100 people of his delegation, the Zulu King Dingane sent his impis to kill the remaining voortrekkers who were camped at Doringkop, Bloukrans (Blaauwekrans), Moordspruit, Rensburgspruit and other sites along the Bushman River (Zulu: Mtshezi), in the present province of KwaZulu-Natal, South Africa, near the town of Weenen.

"Not a soul was spared. Old men, women and babies were murdered in the most brutal manner."

=== Death toll ===
Among the Voortrekkers, 41 men, 56 women and 185 children were killed. In addition another 250 or 252 Khoikhoi and Basuto who accompanied the Voortrekkers were killed, bringing the casualties to 532–534.

The murdered included George Biggar, the son of Alexander Biggar, a trader at Port Natal. Biggar and his second son, Robert, subsequently participated and died in retaliatory attacks on the Zulus. Most people camped at the Klein- and Groot-Moordspruit were murdered. Here a Boer woman, Johanna van der Merwe, sustained 21 assegai wounds but survived. The camps at Rensburgspruit, where Hans van Rensburg and Andries Pretorius were camped, successfully defended themselves.

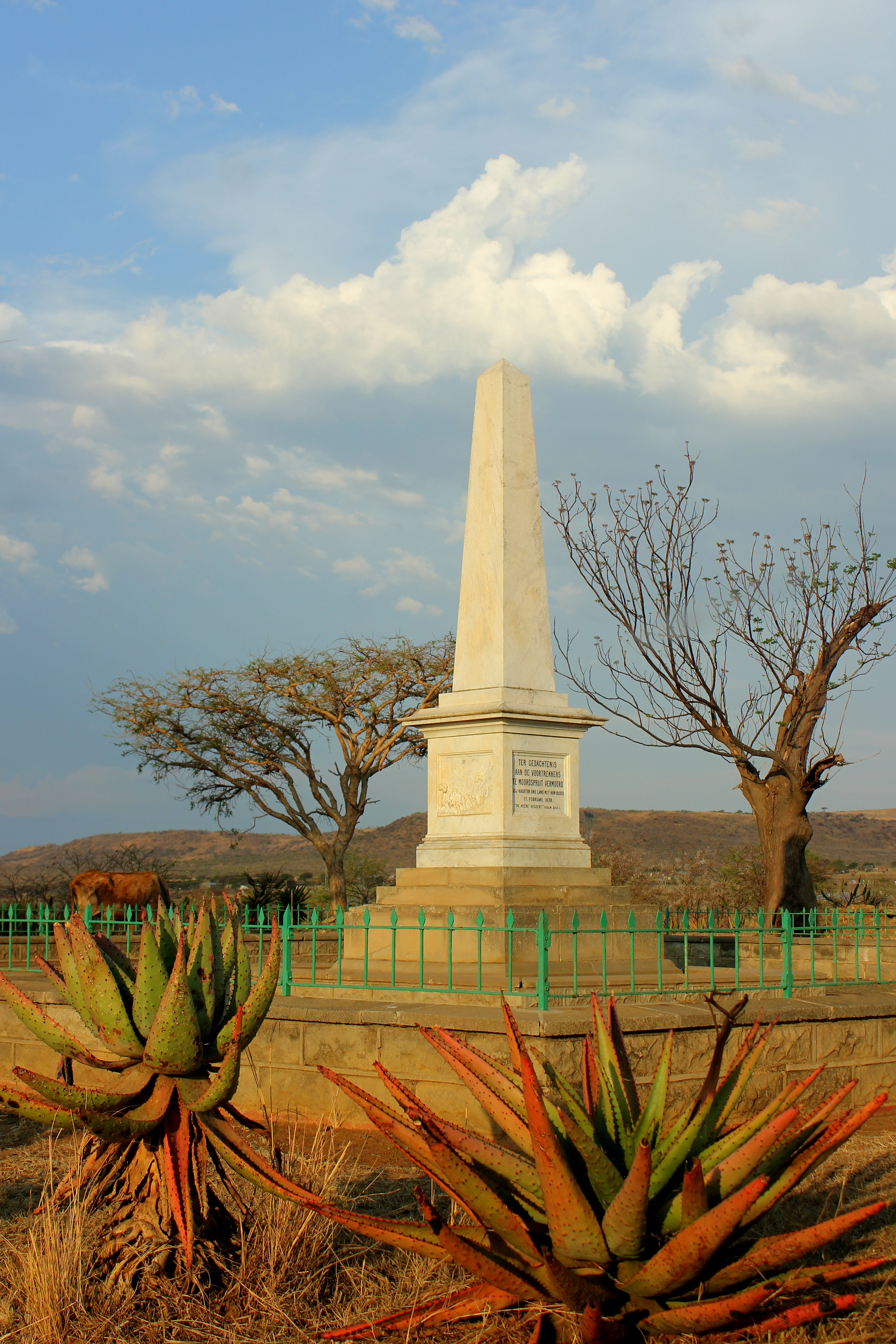
The Bloukrans Memorial commemorating the death of the Boers trekkers during the massacre

Hans van Rensburg's party were compelled to leave their wagons and retreat on foot to a hill, Rensburgkoppie, which was protected by a cliff on one side. Here they were cornered by the Zulus, whom they kept at bay with limited ammunition. When their ammunition was almost exhausted a young man, Marthinus Oosthuizen, arrived on horseback. By shouting instructions they informed him where to locate and salvage ammunition from their camp. This Oosthuizen was able to deliver by charging with his horse through the Zulu file, while covered by the defenders of the hill. With the defense strengthened, the Zulus retreated.

Two months afterwards, on 15 April 1838, Andries Pretorius reflected in his journal: "As we were separated from one another, they succeeded in their attack at daybreak at Blaauwekrans, thereby killing 33 men, 75 women and 123 children." This implies a total of 231 deaths at the Blaauwekrans camps. The name Blaauwekrans (Zulu: Msuluzi) refers to bluish cliff faces present in the area.

== Aftermath ==
The Piet Retief Delegation massacre and the Weenen massacre were the motivation for the Voortrekkers to confront the Zulus in battle on 16 December 1838 when 470 Voortrekkers fought against an estimated 15,000 to 21,000 Zulus; which the Voortrekkers won. The battle is known as the Battle of Blood River.

The town of Weenen (Dutch for "crying" or "weeping") was established two months after the massacre.

== See also ==
- List of massacres in South Africa
