= Bloukrans River (KwaZulu-Natal) =

Coordinates: 28°55′34″S 29°44′33″E

The Bloukrans River (KwaZulu-Natal) originates in the Emangosini foothills of the Njesuthi Drakensberg, in the KwaZulu-Natal province of South Africa. It proceeds in a north-easterly direction, passing the village of Frere, until it joins the Tugela River. The river and its tributaries are mostly undammed, though limited irrigation occurs from its upper reaches. Its original Dutch name Blaauwekrans (Zulu: Msuluzi) referred to bluish cliff faces present in the area.

The Bloukrans's main tributary is the Nyandu River which in turn has the Sterkspruit as a tributary. The remaining tributaries are the Ududuma, Umsobotshe and Ubhubhu rivulets. The De Hoek experimental farm is situated along the Klein-Bloukrans's upper reaches. The Bloukrans River is flanked by the Little Tugela to the west and the Bushman River to the south, both tributaries of the Tugela.

== See also ==
- List of rivers of South Africa
- Weenen massacre
