= Wagendrift Dam =

Dam in KwaZulu-Natal, South Africa

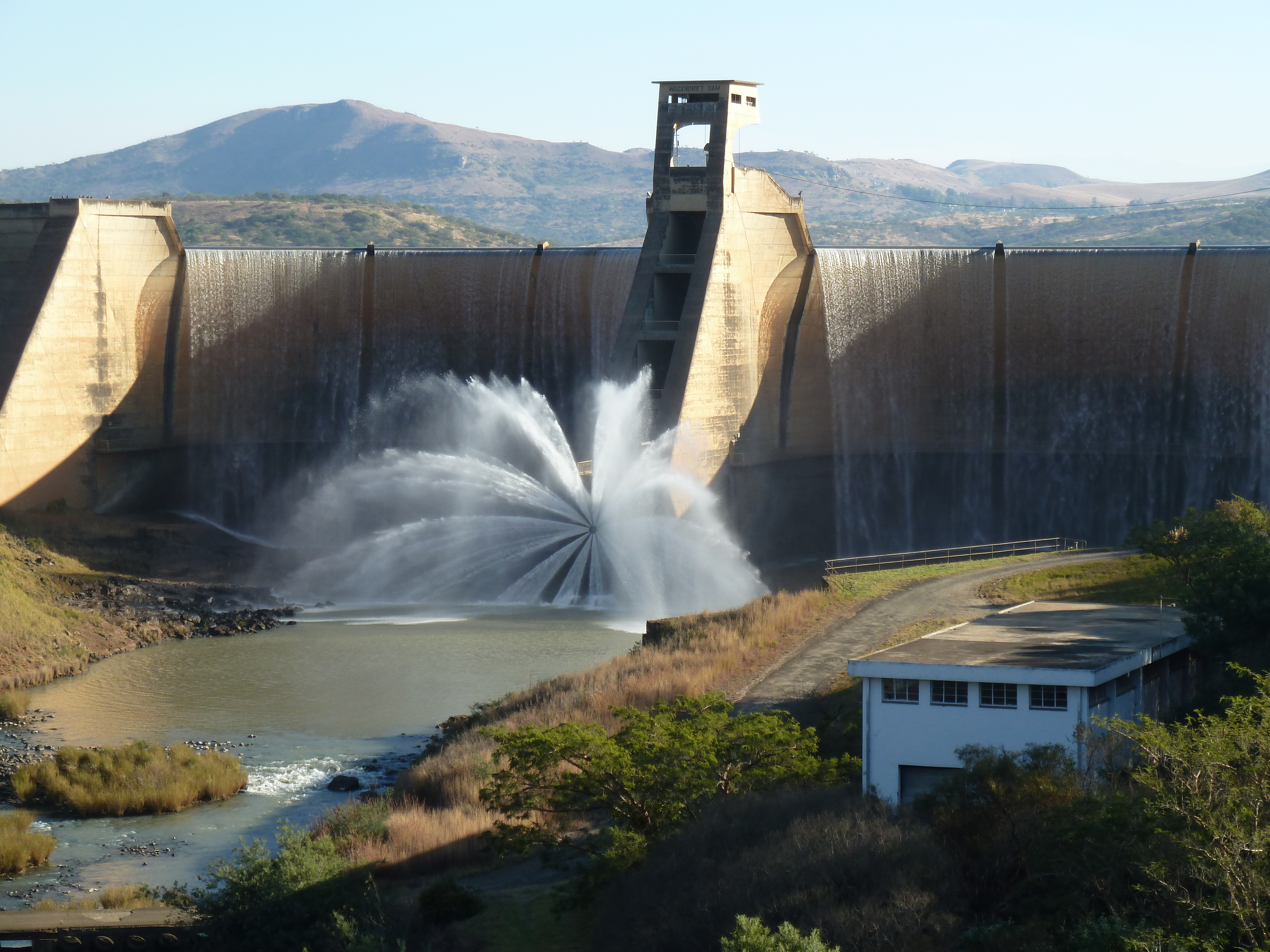
- Interactive map of Wagendrift Dam
- Official name: Wagendrift Dam
- Country: South Africa
- Location: Estcourt, KwaZulu-Natal
- Coordinates: 29°03′S 29°50′E
- Purpose: Irrigation and domestic
- Opening date: 1963
- Owner: Department of Water Affairs

Dam and spillways
- Type of dam: Multi-arch
- Impounds: Bushman's River
- Height: 41.15 m
- Length: 281 m

Reservoir
- Creates: Wagendrift Dam Reservoir
- Total capacity: 55 900 000 m^{3}
- Catchment area: 743 km^{2}
- Surface area: 508.4 ha

The Wagendrift Dam is a multi-arch type dam located on the Bushman's River, upstream of Estcourt, in the KwaZulu-Natal province of South Africa. It was completed in 1963 and serves mainly for irrigation purposes, domestic water supply and industrial demands. The hazard potential of the dam has been ranked high (3).

== See also ==
- List of reservoirs and dams in South Africa
