= Ntabamhlophe =

- Location within KwaZulu-Natal Location within South Africa
- Coordinates: 28.298°S 31.267°E
- Country: South Africa
- Province: KwaZulu-Natal
- District: Uthukela
- Municipality: Inkosi Langalibalele

Area
  - Total: 7.17 km^{2} (2.77 sq mi)

Population (2001)
  - Total: 1,240
  - Density: 173/km^{2} (448/sq mi)
- Time zone: UTC+2 (SAST)
- PO box: 3318

Ntabamhlophe is a town in Uthukela District Municipality in the KwaZulu-Natal province of South Africa.
