= Bushman's River =

Bushman's River Boesmansrivier
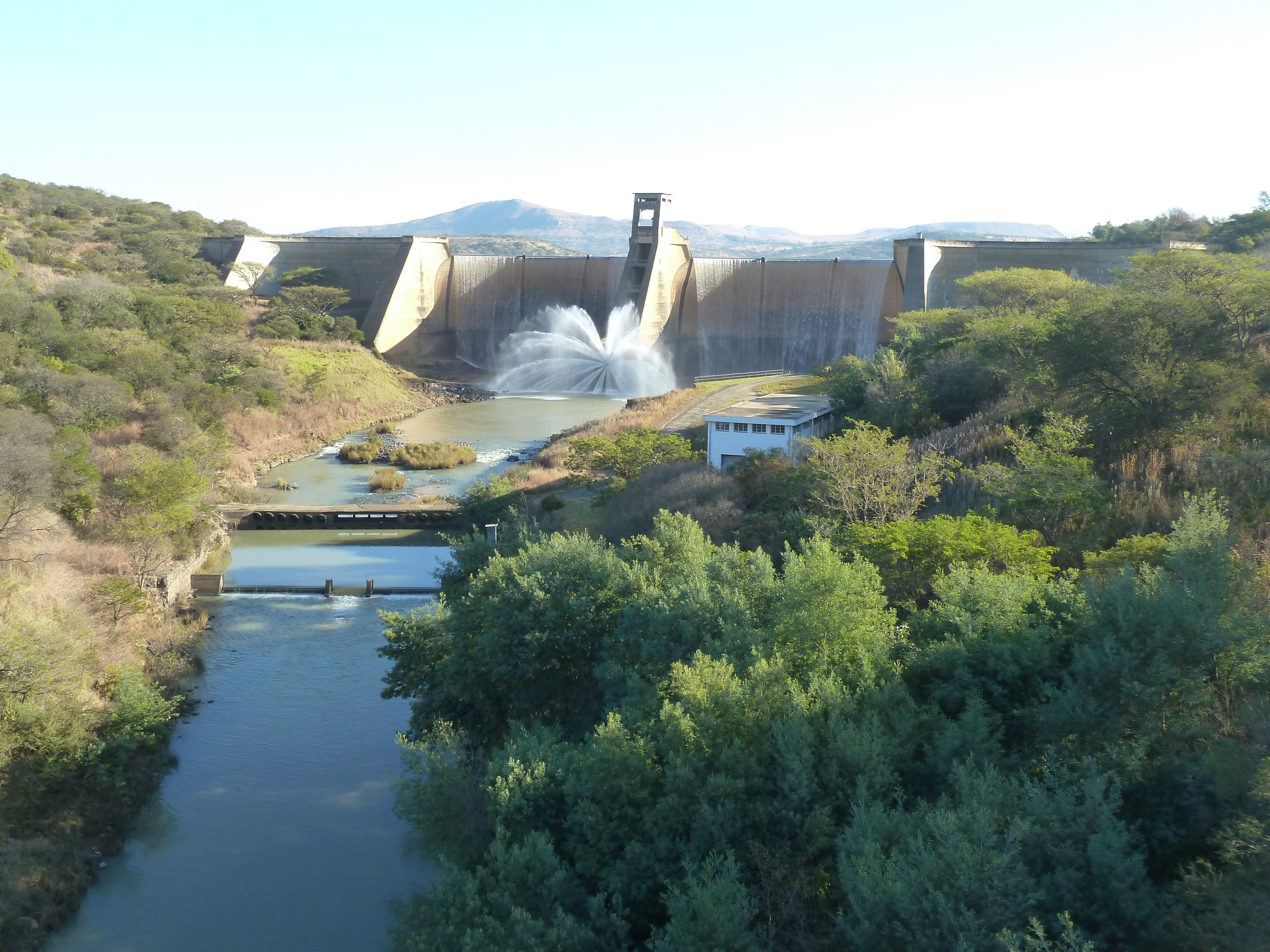
- Bushman's River at Wagendrift Dam

- Location of the Bushman's River mouth
- Native name: uMtshezi (Zulu)

Location
- Country: South Africa
- Province: KwaZulu-Natal

Physical characteristics
- Source
  - location: Drakensberg
- Mouth
  - location: Tugela River, Weenen
  - coordinates: 28°45′39″S 29°57′21″E
  - elevation: 0 m (0 ft)
- Discharge
  - location: Wagendrift Dam
  - average: 358 m^{3}/s (12,600 cu ft/s)

The Bushman's River (Afrikaans: Boesmansrivier) is an east to north-easterly flowing tributary of the Tugela River, in the KwaZulu-Natal province of South Africa. It rises in the Drakensberg Mountain range, with its upper catchment in the Giant's Castle Game Reserve, north of the Giant's Castle promontory. It feeds the Wagendrift Dam and then flows past the town of Estcourt to join the Tugela River near the town of Weenen.

Its tributaries include the Little Bushmans River which joins the Bushmans River at Estcourt, Rensburgspruit, Mtontwanes River and the Mugwenya River. The Wagendrift Dam near Estcourt is its major reservoir. Several densely populated rural villages, many inhabited by the amaHlubi, are found in the river's upper catchment area. The river is flanked by the Bloukrans River to the north and the Mooi River to the south.

== See also ==
- List of rivers of South Africa
- List of reservoirs and dams in South Africa
