= Nazareth Baptist Church =

Zulu religious movement founded by Isaiah Shembe

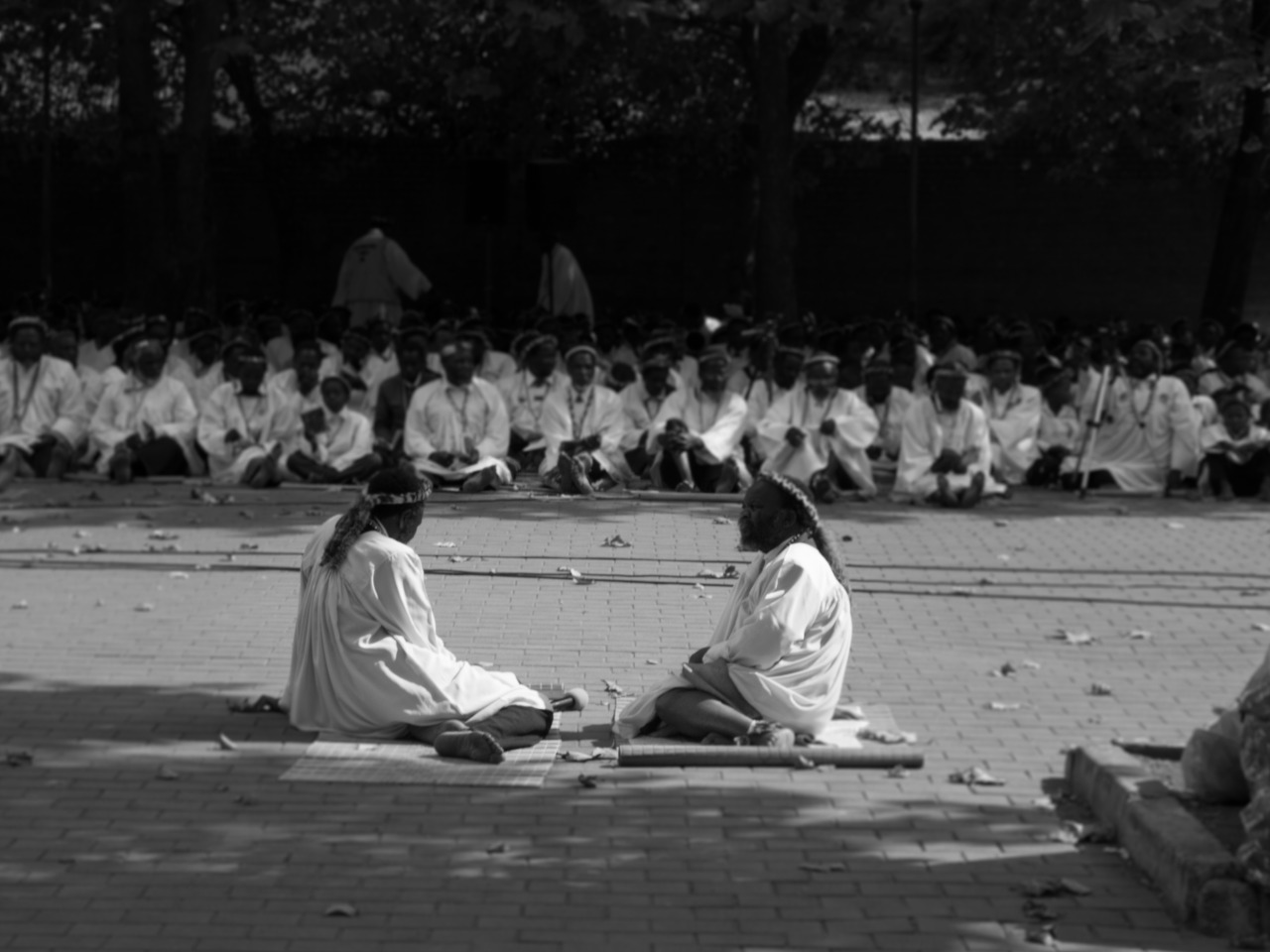
Shembe congregation leaders.

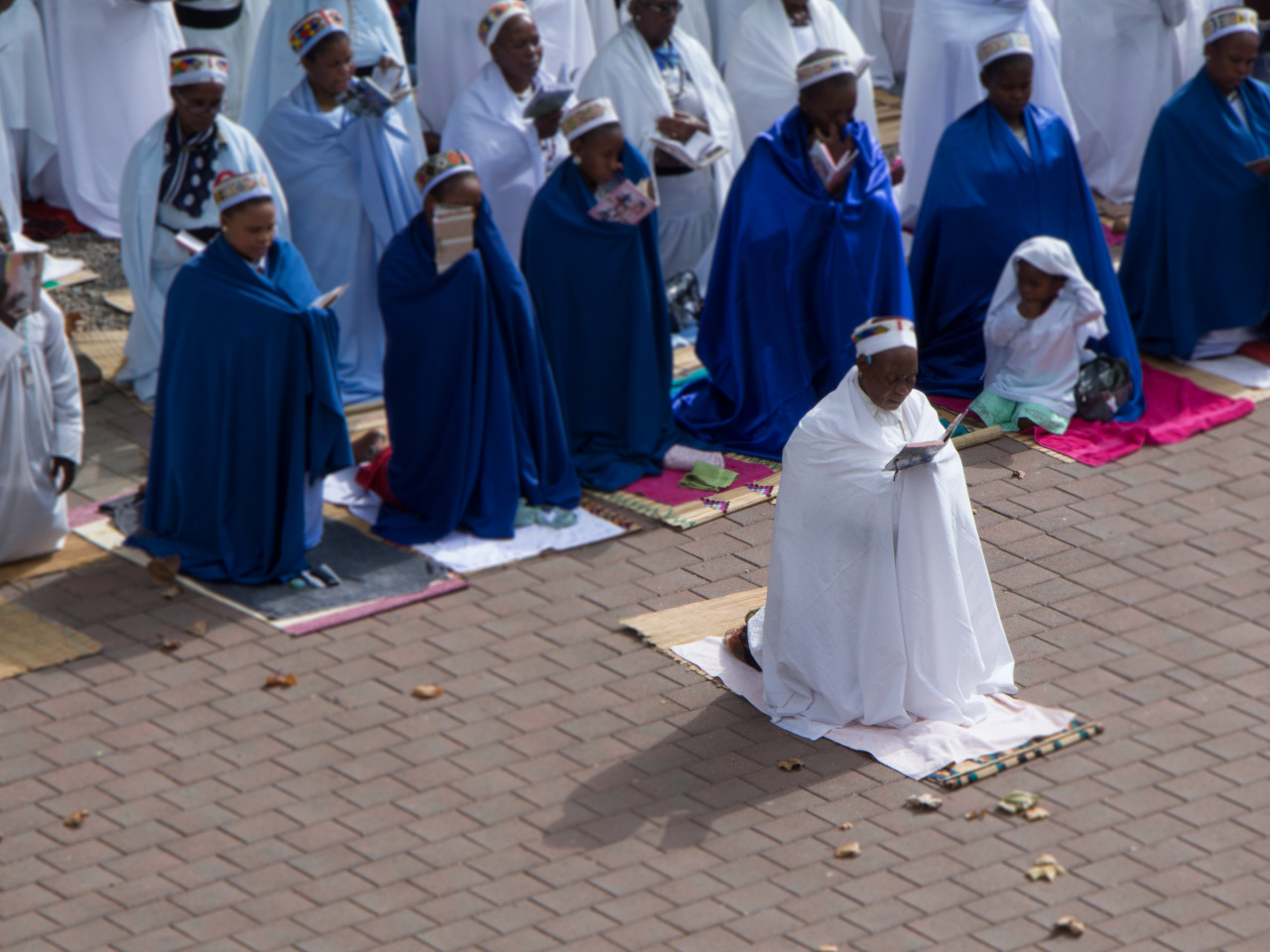
Female Shembe congregants.

The Nazareth Baptist Church (Alternatively called "The Nazarite Church" "iBandla lamaNazaretha") is the second largest African initiated church based in South Africa, founded in 1910.

It reveres Shembe as a prophet sent by God to restore the teachings of Moses, the prophets, and Jesus. Members are Sabbath-observers and avoid pork, smoking, and premarital sex.

It was divided into two groups after the 1976 death of Johannes Galilee Shembe. The larger group was led by Bishop Amos Shembe until his death in 1995, while Rev. Londa Shembe led the smaller group.

As of 2009, it was divided into three factions in KwaZulu-Natal and one in Gauteng.

The religion uses leopard skins as part of their ceremonies, which some activists are trying to stop or replace with synthetic leopard skin.

On 18 October 2016, the KwaZulu-Natal High Court in Durban declared Vela Shembe the legitimate leader of the Nazareth Baptist Church after a protracted court battle, which had dragged on since 2011. Despite this, the previous leader's son Mduduzi Shembe, who lives in the large village of Ebuhleni, remains the de facto head of the church and most church members have ignored the ruling.

== Pilgrimages ==
The Nazaretha begin each year with a Holy pilgrimage to iNhlangakazi, but approximately 6.7 million followers of amaNazaretha no longer go to Inhlangakazi because of court interdicts. As a result, iNkosi uNyazi LweZulu avoided court battles and founded Mount Khenana which is at Ozwathini, on the first Sunday of the New Year. It is said that Isaiah Shembe was drawn to the area where the Holy Spirit told him to start the Church.

They also hold a month-long celebration in Judea near Eshowe every year in October, where members gather to receive the blessings of Shembe.

== World Cup legal challenge ==
In early 2010 the Nazareth Baptist Church claimed that the vuvuzela horn, used by fans attending football matches in South Africa, actually belongs to their church. They threatened to pursue legal action to stop supporters from playing the vuvuzela at the South African World Cup, but no legal proceedings were initiated.

== Vodacom partnership ==
In April 2017 a partnership between the African mobile communications company Vodacom and the Vela Shembe faction was announced in which the church would distribute Vodacom products and services. Landile Shembe, the Shembe Family Trust representative, the faction had about 10 000 members of which approximately 2.4 million subscribed to Vodafone.
