= Gateway =

Gateway often refers to a gate or portal.

Gateway or The Gateway may also refer to:

== Arts and entertainment ==
- Gateway (sculpture), a sculpture formerly located in Dún Laoghaire, Ireland

=== Films ===
- Gateway (film), a 1938 drama
- The Gateway (2015 film), a horror film
- The Gateway (2017 film), a science-fiction film
- The Gateway (2021 film), a crime thriller

=== Music ===
- Gateway (band), a jazz trio featuring John Abercrombie, Jack DeJohnette, and Dave Holland
  - Gateway (Gateway album) (1976)
- Gateway (Bongzilla album)
- Gateway, an album by Erik Wøllo

=== Literature ===
- Gateway (novel), a 1977 science-fiction novel by Frederik Pohl
- Gateway (character), a supporting character in Marvel's X-Men series
- The Gateway (student magazine), the student magazine at the University of Alberta, Canada
- The Gateway (student newspaper), a UK student business and careers newspaper
- The Gateway (poetry collection), a 1953 collection of poetry by Judith Wright
- SF Gateway, a science-fiction imprint of British book publisher Victor Gollancz Ltd
- Gateway Editions, a philosophy imprint of American book publisher Regnery Publishing
- Gateway, a 2014 four-issue comic book limited series published by IDW Publishing

=== Gaming ===
- Gateway (video game), a 1992 interactive fiction game based on Frederik Pohl's novel
  - Gateway II: Homeworld, the 1993 sequel
- Gateway Galaxy, the opening level in the video game Super Mario Galaxy
- Gateway 3DS, a flash cartridge for the Nintendo 3DS; see Nintendo 3DS storage devices

=== Sports ===
- Gateway Motorsports Park, an auto racing track in St. Louis, Missouri

== Buildings ==
- The Gateway, Nantwich, England
- The Gateway, Hong Kong, Tsim Sha Tsui, Kowloon, Hong Kong, a shopping centre
- The Gateway, Singapore, a twin-building office complex
- Gateway Theatre of Shopping, a shopping centre in uMhlanga, South Africa
- Westfield Gateway, an enclosed shopping mall in Lincoln, Nebraska, United States
- The Gateway (New Brunswick, New Jersey), New Jersey, United States
- The Gateway (Salt Lake City), Salt Lake City, Utah, United States, a residential, retail and office complex
- Gateway Sports and Entertainment Complex, a stadium complex in Cleveland, Ohio, United States
- Gateway Arch, St. Louis, Missouri, United States
- Gateway Center (disambiguation)
- Gateway Mall (disambiguation)
- Gateway Theatre (disambiguation)
- Gateway Tower (disambiguation)

== Companies ==
- Gateway, Inc., a computer manufacturer
- Gateway Newstands, a Canadian convenience store chain
- Gateway Supermarket, a former UK supermarket chain rebranded as Somerfield in the 1990s
- Gateway Television, a defunct American-owned Pan-African subscription television network

== Places in Antarctica ==
- The Gateway (Antarctica)

== Places in the United States ==
- Gateway, Alaska, a census-designated place
- Gateway, Arkansas, a town
- Gateway, Nevada County, California, an unincorporated community
- Gateway, San Diego, California, a neighborhood of San Diego
- Gateway, Colorado, an unincorporated community
- Gateway, Florida, a census-designated place
- Gateway, Pinellas County, Florida, a business district in Florida
- Gateway, Camden, a neighborhood of Camden, New Jersey
- Gateway, Oregon, an unincorporated community
- Gateway National Recreation Area, parks and beaches in New York City and New Jersey
- Gateway Region, the most urbanized part of northeastern New Jersey

== Schools in the United States ==
- Gateway Regional High School (Massachusetts)
- Gateway Academy (Laredo, Texas), a charter high school in Laredo, Texas
- Gateway Academy (Scottsdale, Arizona), a private special school in Scottsdale, Arizona
- Gateway Technical College, a public technical college in southeastern Wisconsin

== Sports ==
- Gateway International Raceway, a racetrack in Madison, Illinois, United States
- Gateway Collegiate Athletic Conference, a women's sports conference that operated from 1983 to 1992 before being absorbed by the Missouri Valley Conference
- Gateway Football Conference, a college football league now known as the Missouri Valley Football Conference
- Gateway United, a professional football club in Ogun State, Nigeria

== Technology ==
- Gateway (telecommunications), a network node equipped for interfacing with another network that uses different communication protocols
- Gateway (web page), a web page designed to attract visitors and search engines to a particular website
- Gateway Technology, a cloning system in molecular biology
- Lunar Gateway, a planned moon orbit space station

== Transportation ==
- Gateway Bridge (disambiguation)
- Gateway Motorway, a motorway in Brisbane
- Gateway Boulevard, a major street in Edmonton, Alberta, Canada
- Gateway Transportation Center, a rail and bus terminal station in downtown St. Louis, Missouri
- Gateway station (disambiguation)
- Gateway Project, a rail expansion project between New York City and Newark, New Jersey
- Greater Vancouver Gateway Program, an infrastructure project for Greater Vancouver
- Takanawa Gateway Station, a train station in Tokyo, Japan

== See also ==
- Gateway Academy, another disambiguation page
- Gateway Church, another disambiguation page
- Gateway drug effect, a hypothesis on drug use
- Gateways (disambiguation)
