= La Lucia Mall =

Shopping centre in uMhlanga, South Africa

- Interactive map of the La Lucia Mall area

General information
- Location: La Lucia, uMhlanga, KwaZulu-Natal, South Africa, 90 William Campbell Drive, La Lucia, uMhlanga, 4051
- Coordinates: 29.75363°S 31.06527°E
- Opening: 1974
- Owner: Growthpoint Properties

Technical details
- Floor count: 3
- Floor area: 37,464 m^{2} (403,260 sq ft)

Design and construction
- Architecture firm: Bentel Associates International
- Main contractor: WBHO

Other information
- Number of stores: 120+ stores

Website
- laluciamall.co.za

La Lucia Mall is a shopping centre situated in the La Lucia area of uMhlanga in KwaZulu-Natal, South Africa, approximately 19 kilometres (11.8 mi) north-east of Durban.

== History ==
La Lucia Mall officially opened its doors to the public in 1974 with the original structure designed by Bentel Associates International being 12 000m² and comprising 45 stores with Pick n Pay as its anchor tenant.

In 2003, Growthpoint completed its R6 million expansion of La Lucia Mall, increasing its size of the mall by 1 750m² to 35 000m² followed by a R7,7 million expansion in 2006, further increasing the mall’s size by 1 355m² to accommodate the very first Dis-Chem pharmacy in KwaZulu-Natal, at a size of 1824m². This was followed by a R12 million expansion in 2015 which saw Woolworths expand its department store in the mall by 800m².

In 2022, Growthpoint Properties completed its new luxury apartment development adjacent to La Lucia Mall named Kent La Lucia, expanding the La Lucia Mall precinct. The R140 million standalone ten-storey apartment building was developed with the aim to create a walkable mixed-use lifestyle with amenities in close proximity such as shopping, dining, a park and a gym amongst others.

On 3 November 2024, Food Lover’s Market closed down its supermarket in La Lucia Mall in which the space was later taken over by Checkers in November 2025 with the retailer’s upmarket FreshX concept.

== Location ==
=== Site ===
La Lucia Mall is situated towards the east of the suburb of La Lucia, near the M4 and is bounded by Armstrong Avenue to the east and south, William Campbell Drive to the north, and Oakleigh Avenue to the west.

=== Catchment ===
The catchment area of La Lucia includes the suburb of La Lucia itself as well as uMhlanga to the north, Mount Edgecombe to the west and Durban North to the south.

=== Accessibility ===
Access is primarily via Armstrong Avenue and William Campbell Drive, with Armstrong Avenue providing direct connectivity to the M4 (Leo Boyd Highway), linking the mall to Durban and uMhlanga Rocks.

== Tenants ==
La Lucia Mall comprises over 120 stores, with anchor tenants including Woolworths, Checkers, Pick n Pay, Clicks, Dis-Chem and Virgin Active.

Other notable tenants within the mall include:

- Absolute Pets
- Ackermans
- Cape Union Mart
- Cell C
- Cotton On
- Foschini
- FNB
- MTN
- Mr Price
- Mugg & Bean
- Nedbank
- Petshop Science
- Pick n Pay Clothing
- Specsavers
- Sorbet
- Starbucks
- Telkom
- Vida e Caffè
- Vodashop
- WeBuyCars
- Wimpy
