= Umhlanga =

Umhlanga may refer to:

- uMhlanga, KwaZulu-Natal, a town north of Durban
- uMhlanga Lagoon Nature Reserve on the shore of the Indian Ocean at Umhlanga Rocks, South Africa
- Umhlanga River (Ohlanga River) a river in KwaZulu-Natal
- Umhlanga (ceremony) or Reed Dance in Eswatini
- Umhlanga (House of Assembly of South Africa constituency), defunct electoral district
