= La Lucia =

- Suburb
- Location within KwaZulu-Natal Location within South Africa
- Coordinates: 29.750°S 31.058°E
- Country: South Africa
- Province: KwaZulu-Natal
- Municipality: eThekwini
- Main Place: uMhlanga

Area
  - Total: 4.11 km^{2} (1.59 sq mi)

Population (2011)
  - Total: 6,414
  - Density: 1,560/km^{2} (4,040/sq mi)

Racial makeup (2011)
  - Black African: 16.8%
  - Coloured: 2.5%
  - Indian/Asian: 19.8%
  - White: 59.4%
  - Other: 1.4%

First languages (2011)
  - English: 80.3%
  - Zulu: 8.2%
  - Afrikaans: 6.2%
  - Xhosa: 1.1%
  - Other: 4.2%
- Time zone: UTC+2 (SAST)
- Postal code (street): 4051
- PO box: 4159

La Lucia is a wealthy suburb located in uMhlanga in the KwaZulu-Natal province of South Africa and is situated approximately 14 kilometres (9 mi) north of the Durban CBD. It was named after Lucia Michel. She and her husband Albert Michel founded the sugar cane farm La Lucia.

== Commerce ==
La Lucia is primarily a residential neighbourhood; however, it also features La Lucia Mall to the east, the area's only shopping centre, anchored by Pick n Pay, Woolworths, Clicks, Dis-Chem and Virgin Active. Just north of the suburb is La Lucia Ridge, a major office estate, adding a commercial dimension to the area.

=== La Lucia Ridge ===
La Lucia Ridge Office Estate is an office estate bordering the M41 freeway to the north of La Lucia. The office estate owned and developed by Tongaat Hulett comprises 10 smaller office parks which include small and major corporations such as the headquarters for Unilever South Africa, Aspen Pharmacare, SA Home Loans and Consumer Relief as well as the regional offices for Multichoice, Sappi, Sanlam, Liquid Telecom and Deloitte. It also contains the German Honorary Consulate for Durban.

== Geography ==
La Lucia is situated on a slope overlooking the Indian Ocean, forming part of the Northern Municipal Planning Region of eThekwini, also known as the FunShine Coast or the uMhlanga Coast.

The suburb is situated towards the southern boundary of uMhlanga with Durban, and borders on uMhlanga Ridge to the north, uMhlanga Rocks to the east, Durban North to the south and Somerset Park and Sunningdale to the west.

== Safety ==
In terms of policing, La Lucia is covered by the policing precinct of Durban North SAPS (located approx. 2,7 km to the south in Broadway, Durban North).

== Transport ==
La Lucia is bordered by three routes, namely the M41 (north), M4 (east) and the M12 (west). The M41 is a major highway connecting uMhlanga with Mount Edgecombe and Phoenix to the west and provides access to the N2 (to Durban and KwaDukuza). The M4 (Leo Boyd Highway) connects Durban to the south with uMhlanga Rocks and Ballito to the north. The M12 (uMhlanga Rocks Drive) connects uMhlanga Ridge to the north with Durban North to the south.

== Education ==
Crawford College, La Lucia, established in 1999, is a large private school located in the suburb. La Lucia Junior Primary and Redwood College La Lucia are also located in La Lucia.

== Demographics ==
Many houses have been developed recently in La Lucia with the population growing substantially between 2001 and 2011. The population rose 121% from 2,899 to 6,414. Black Africans, Indians and Asians, saw an especially large increase in numbers.
