= Gateway Academy =

Gateway Academy may refer to:

- Gateway Academy (Laredo, Texas), a charter high school in Laredo, Texas, United States
- Gateway Academy (Scottsdale, Arizona), a private special school in Scottsdale, Arizona, United States
- The Gateway Academy, Essex, a secondary school in Grays, Essex, England

== See also ==
- Gateway (disambiguation)
