= List of hotels in South Africa =

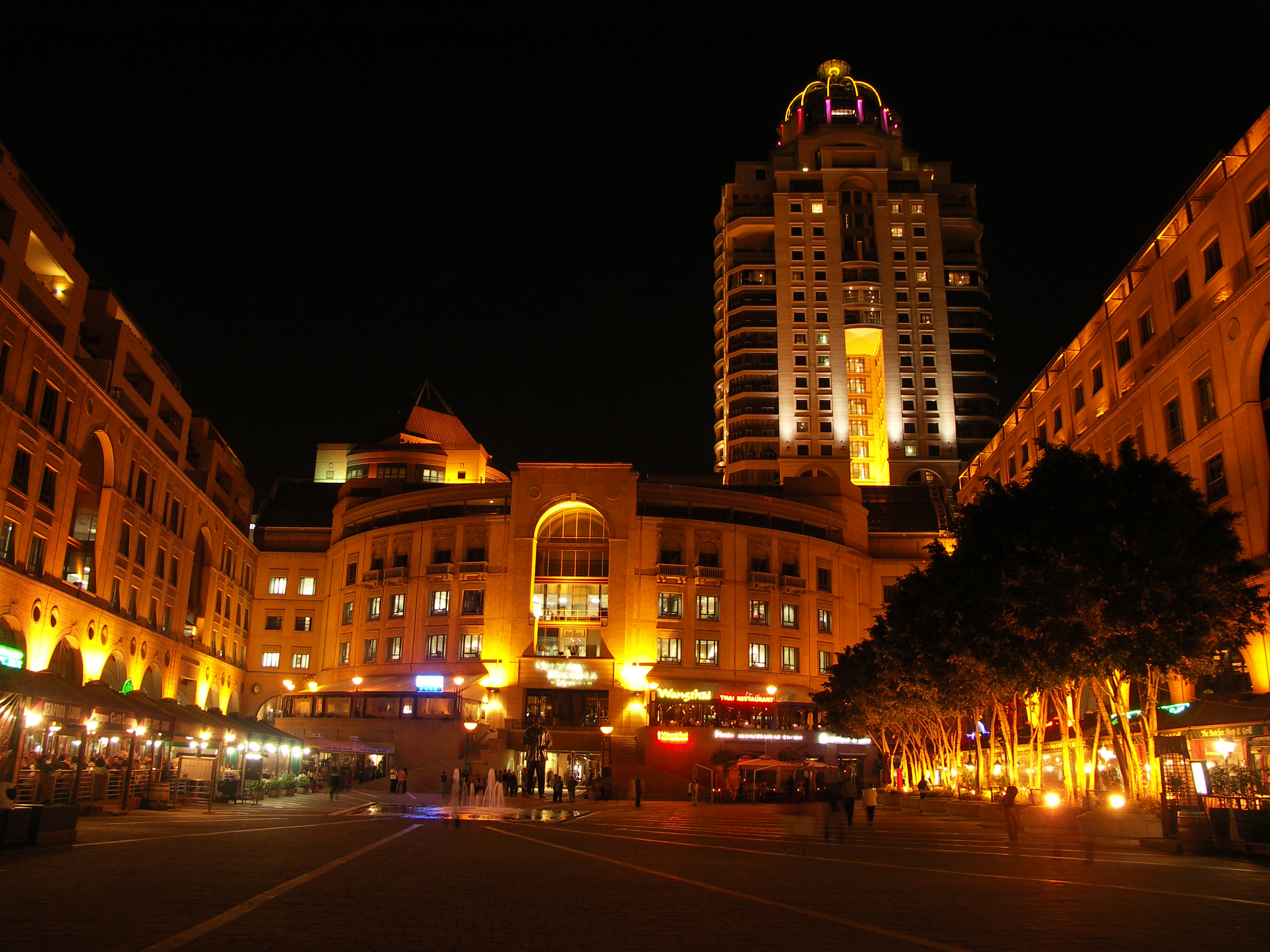
Michelangelo Towers viewed from Nelson Mandela Square

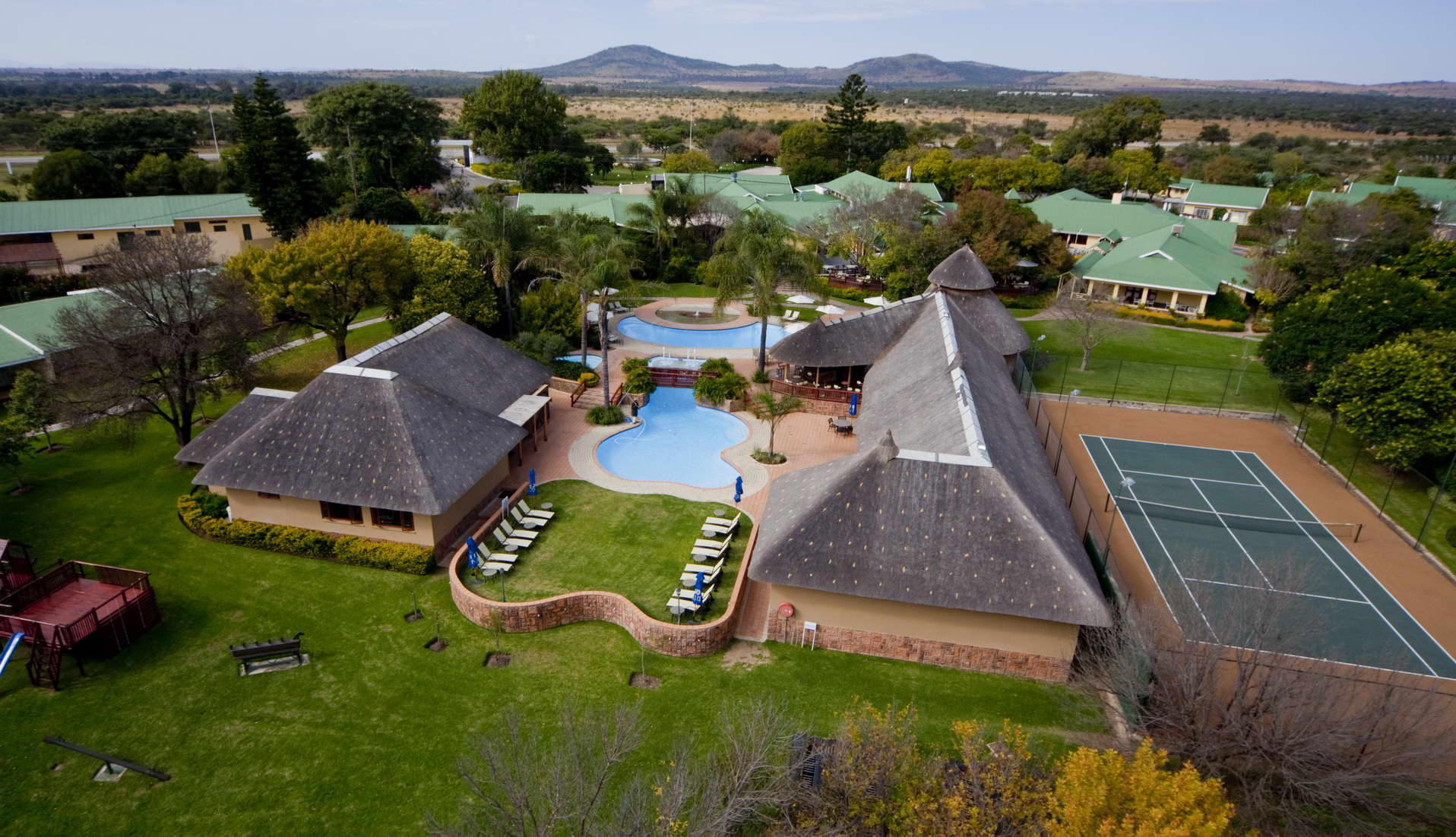
Swimming pools and gardens at The Ranch Resort

This is a list of notable hotels in South Africa.

== Gauteng ==
=== Johannesburg Metropole ===
- Hilton Sandton, Sandton (now NH Sandton)
- Michelangelo Towers, Sandton

== KwaZulu-Natal ==
=== Durban Metropole ===
- The Oyster Box, uMhlanga

=== Elephant Coast ===
- Thanda Safari, near Hluhluwe

== Limpopo ==
- The Ranch Resort, near Polokwane

== North West ==
- Rio Casino Resort, Klerksdorp
- Sun City

== Western Cape ==
=== Cape Winelands ===
- Le Quartier Français, Franschhoek

=== Swartberg ===
- The Royal Hotel, Riebeek-Kasteel

== See also ==
- List of companies of South Africa
- Lists of hotels – an index of hotel list articles on Wikipedia

Genesis, a hotel in Johannesburg
