= The Oyster Box =

The Oyster Box may refer to:

- The Oyster Box (Jersey) – hotel in St Brelade's Bay, Jersey
- The Oyster Box (South Africa) – hotel in Umhlanga, South Africa
