= Gateways =

Gateways may refer to:

== Art and entertainment ==
- Gateways (novel), the seventh volume of the Repairman Jack books by F. Paul Wilson
- Gateways (Star Trek), a 2001 crossover novel series
- Gateways (video game), a 2012 action-adventure platformer
- "Gateways", a song by Dimmu Borgir from Abrahadabra

== Organizations ==
- Gateways (organization), an American Orthodox Judaism outreach organization
- Gateways club, a lesbian nightclub in Chelsea, London, England
- Gateways High School, a public high school in Springfield, Oregon, United States
- Gateways School, an independent school in Leeds, West Yorkshire, England

== See also ==
- Gateway (disambiguation)
- The Gateway (disambiguation)
