= Oceans Mall =

Shopping centre in uMhlanga, South Africa

- Interactive map of the Oceans Mall area

General information
- Location: 15 Lagoon Drive, uMhlanga Rocks, uMhlanga, KwaZulu-Natal, South Africa, 4320
- Coordinates: 29.7247322°S 31.0856907°E
- Construction started: February 2019
- Opening: 15 November 2022
- Cost: R1.3 billion
- Owner: Vivian Reddy and Rob Alexander
- Landlord: Oceans Umhlanga (Pty) Ltd

Technical details
- Floor count: 2
- Floor area: 36,000 m²

Design and construction
- Architecture firm: Elphick Proome Architecture
- Structural engineer: Sutherland Engineers
- Civil engineer: Sutherland Engineers
- Main contractor: WBHO

Other information
- Number of stores: 120
- Parking: 1,081 bays

Website
- oceansmallumhlanga.co.za

Oceans Mall is a shopping centre situated in the coastal town of uMhlanga, KwaZulu-Natal, South Africa, approximately 19 kilometres (11,8 mi) north-east of Durban.

Co-developed by businessman and founder of the Edison Group Vivian Reddy, as well as businessman Rob Alexandra, the 36,000 m² Oceans Mall forms part of the R4.3 billion mixed-use Oceans Umhlanga Development located in the bustling heart of uMhlanga Rocks, also known as uMhlanga Village.

The first phase of the shopping centre was launched on the 15 November 2022 with the second phase launched in March 2023 which included the opening of “Platinum Walk”, an array of premium international fashion brands and the first of its kind in Durban.

== Accolades ==
Oceans Mall has been internationally recognised for its unique, “soft-flowing”, curvilinear architecture at the International Property Awards.

== Location ==
=== Site ===
Oceans Mall is built on the former site of the uMhlanga Rocks Post Office (moved to its present site on the western end of Oceans Mall on Ridge Road) and the Umhlanga Country Club (moved to its present site in Prestondale, uMhlanga).

=== Accessibility ===
Oceans Mall is bounded by Lagoon Drive to the east, Ridge Road to the west, Lighthouse Road to the south and Flamingo Lane to the north. It is mainly accessible via pedestrian and vehicular entrances (to the parking area) on Lagoon Drive with alternate vehicular entrances on Lighthouse Road and Ridge Road and alternate pedestrian entrances on Ridge Road.

== Tenants ==
Oceans Mall comprises 120 stores, with anchor tenants including: Woolworths Food, Checkers and its complimentary stores of Checkers Liquor, Checkers Little Me, Medirite Pharmacy and Checkers Outdoor (the third standalone store in South Africa) as well as Clicks and Pick n Pay Clothing.

=== Platinum Walk ===
Platinum Walk, located at the southern end of the shopping centre on the first floor, is designed with a similar concept to Diamond Walk in Sandton City. It is home to a variety of premium international fashion brands, many of which are made their debut in Durban. These include:

- Hugo Boss
- Burberry
- Diesel
- Dolce & Gabbana
- Emporio Armani
- Gucci
- Jimmy Choo
- Lacoste
- Roberto Cavalli (the first flagship store in South Africa)
- Versace
