= Avis Southern Africa =

Car rental company

Avis Rent a Car South Africa
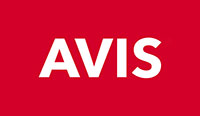
- Company type: Private
- Industry: Investment services
- Predecessor: Zeda Car Rental and Tours
- Founded: Bloemfontein, South Africa (1967)
- Headquarters: Kempton Park, Gauteng, South Africa
- Area served: South Africa
- Key people: Rainer Gottschick (CEO)
- Services: Car rental
- Parent: Barloworld Limited
- Website: www.avis.co.za

Avis Rent a Car South Africa, better known as Avis, is a South African car rental company headquartered in Kempton Park, Gauteng, South Africa. Avis Rent a Car South Africa is part of the Avis Rent a Car System and the company operates as a subsidiary of Barloworld Limited since it was acquired in March 2005 and was delisted from Johannesburg Stock Exchange. The name Avis, however, remained unaltered.

== History ==
Avis was the brainchild of Warren Avis, who realised there was a need for people to be transported from airports to other destinations. With this insight in mind, Avis was born in December 1946 in Detroit at Willow Run Airport. Despite keen opposition, Avis managed to grow at the fastest rate of any major company during the 1960s.

In 1967, Zeda Car Rental and Tours (Pty) Ltd was established in Bloemfontein. Shortly thereafter, Federale Volksbeleggings Bpk, a subsidiary of Sanlam, acquired a majority shareholding in the company. Later Federale went into a joint venture with Avis Rent a Car System, thereby adopting the name Avis. Following the adoption of the Avis name, the business grew steadily and by 1972, the car rental business had expanded to include Johannesburg, Durban and Cape Town.

== Expansion ==
By 1972 the company was represented countrywide and in 1980 it diversified into full maintenance leasing. To accommodate this diversification, Zeda Car Rental & Tours (Pty) Ltd changed its name to Zeda Car Leasing (Pty) Ltd. By the mid-1980s, the company had grown into the largest licensee outside the United States and was registered as Zeda Holdings (Pty) Ltd. The business began to expand beyond South Africa into Botswana, Lesotho, Namibia and Swaziland and administered sub-licensees in Angola, Madagascar, Malawi, Mozambique, Zambia and Zimbabwe.

== Timeline ==
In 1991, Zeda Holdings entered into an agreement with the AVIS international company, which allowed them access to the Wizard real time, on-line computer system that services Avis operations around the world. The Federale name changed several times and in 1992 the name Fedservices changed to Servgro International Limited. Servgro listed on the Johannesburg Stock Exchange in August 1992, with Servgro holding 85 percent of the shares and Avis senior management holding 15 percent of the shares.

In 1993, Avis was awarded the South African Bureau of Standards ISO 9002 quality management system.

In April 1997, Servgro unbundled and Avis Southern Africa was listed on the Johannesburg Stock Exchange, Namibia Stock Exchange and Botswana Stock Exchange stock exchanges.

In 1998, Avis Luxury cars were introduced, offering customers luxurious self-drive spoils and in 2001 Avis Chauffeur Drive was introduced.

In 2002, Grenville Wilson introduced the Avis Brand Ambassador way of life to Avis, a programme aimed at engendering a culture of “choose to” people within Avis. In the same year Avis introduced its Point-to-point service.

In March 2005, Barloworld Limited acquired the full ownership of Avis Southern Africa, hence the delisting from the Johannesburg Stock Exchange.

== See also ==
- First Car Rental
- Motorhome hire agency
