= Remy Kloos =

South African mountaineer

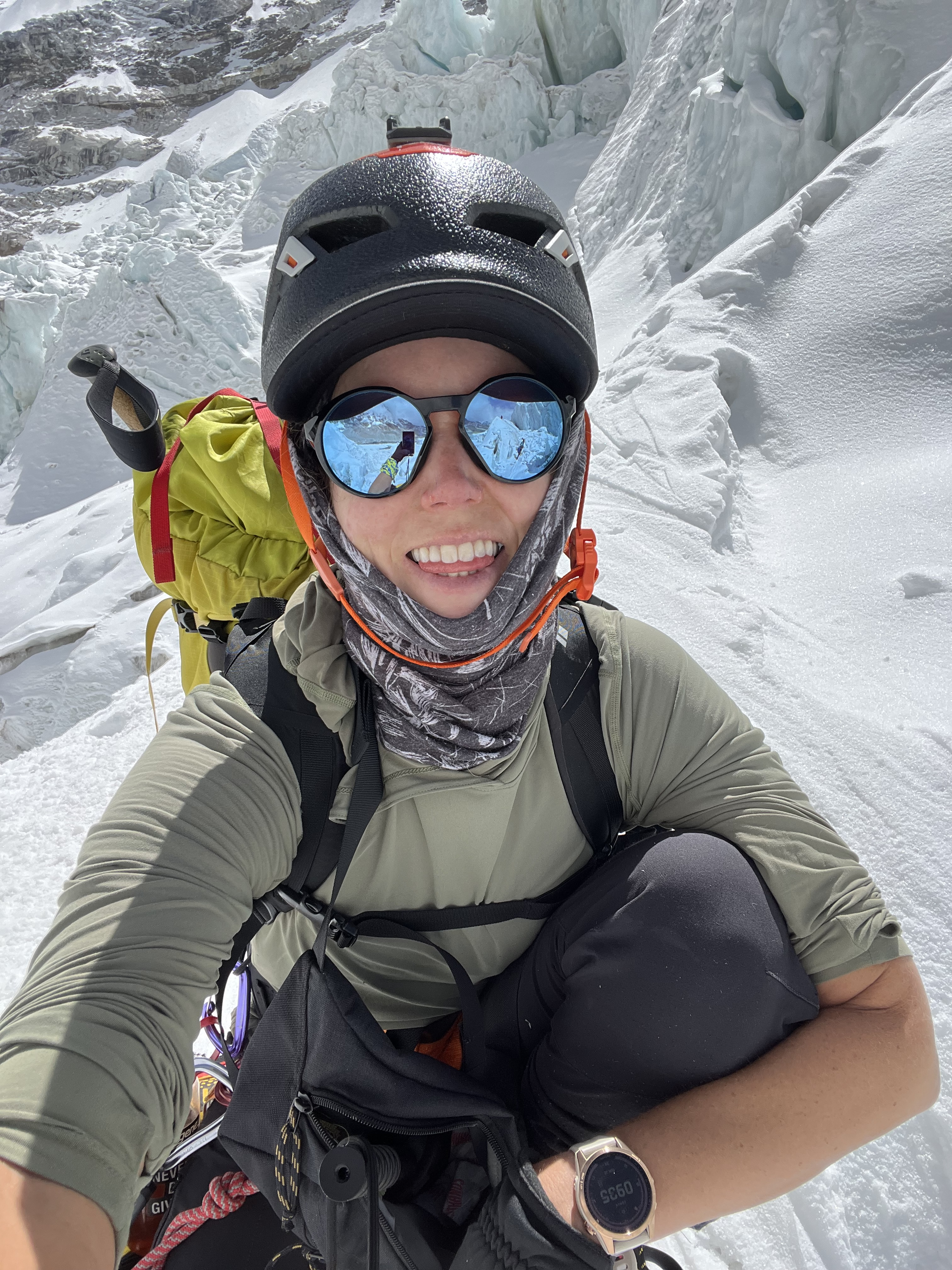
- Expedition leader, Remy Kloos in the Khumbu Icefall, Everest season, Nepal
- Born: Cape Town, South Africa
- Citizenship: South African
- Occupations: Mountaineer, expedition leader, keynote speaker
- Known for: First South African to summit Everest and Lhotse in 24 hours

Remy Kloos is a South African mountaineer, expedition leader and keynote speaker. In May 2022, she became the first South African to summit both Mount Everest and Mount Lhotse within 24 hours, and the first South African woman to summit Lhotse.

== Early life ==
Kloos was born in Cape Town, South Africa. she began solo traveling in 2017, which led her to mountaineering. She has cited the sport as a pivotal experience for building resilience, which later informed her work as a coach and speaker.

== Career ==
=== Corporate work ===
Before mountaineering, Kloos worked in the sustainability division at Growthpoint Properties, a South African real estate investment trust.

=== Mountaineering ===
Kloos has completed the Seven Summits, climbing the highest peak on each continent: Denali, Vinson Massif, Elbrus, Aconcagua, Kilimanjaro, and Kosciuszko. In May 2022, she became the first South African to summit both Mount Everest and Mount Lhotse within 24 hours, which also made her the first South African woman to summit Lhotse. Brand South Africa recognized the achievement as a historic national milestone.

== Expedition leadership and advocacy ==
Kloos is a professional expedition leader, guiding commercial and private climbs. Alongside this work, she organizes and dedicates expeditions to raise funds for charitable causes. In 2024, she guided an all-women's team on Kilimanjaro for children's charities and led an Everest Base Camp trek for the Avela Foundation, which supports burn survivors. She has also dedicated climbs to support the Dlala Nje Foundation.

== Public speaking ==
Kloos works as a keynote speaker and mindset coach, discussing themes of resilience and leadership derived from her mountaineering experiences. She has spoken at events such as the BCX Namibia Transform Summit and been featured on podcasts including The Consummate Athlete, CapeTalk's Afternoons with Pippa Hudson.

== See also ==
- Seven Summits
- Mount Everest
- Lhotse
