= Waygate =

Waygate may refer to:

- Gates of gateways
- Sluices of watermills, barrages, dams; and their gates
- Watergate (architecture)
- Waygate (The Wheel of Time), a supernatural portal in The Wheel of Time fantasy novel series

== See also ==
- Gateway (disambiguation)
- Gate (disambiguation)
- Way (disambiguation)
