= Gateway station =

Gateway Station may refer to:

== Transportation stations ==
- Charlotte Gateway Station, a proposed intermodal transit facility in Charlotte, North Carolina
- Gateway station (SkyTrain), a station on the SkyTrain Expo Line in Surrey, British Columbia
- Gateway Transportation Center, or Gateway Station, in St. Louis, Missouri
- Gateway Transit Center (TriMet), or Gateway station, on the MAX Light Rail system in Portland, Oregon
- Gateway station (Pittsburgh Regional Transit), a Pittsburgh Light Rail station
- Gateway Monorail Station on the defunct Sentosa Monorail, in Singapore
- Gateway Station, on the Emerald Express bus rapid transit system in Eugene, Oregon

== Other uses ==
- Lunar Gateway, a.k.a. Gateway, a proposed international space station around the Moon
- Exploration Gateway Platform, an orbital platform proposal by Boeing
- Gateway Station, a fictional asteroid station in the Frederick Pohl fictional universe of the Heechee

== See also ==
- Gateway (disambiguation)
