= Gateway Mall =

Gateway Mall may refer to:

== United States ==
- The Gateway (Salt Lake City), an open-air mall in Utah
- Gateway Fashion Mall, an enclosed mall in Bismarck, North Dakota
- Gateway Town Center (Gateway Mall), a shopping center in Jacksonville, Florida
- Prescott Gateway, a shopping mall in Prescott, Arizona
- Gateway Mall (Springfield, Oregon)
- Gateway Mall (Lincoln, Nebraska), a shopping mall in Lincoln, Nebraska
- Gateway Center Mall, an outdoor shopping mall in the Spring Creek neighborhood of Brooklyn, New York
- St. Louis Gateway Mall, the strip of land in downtown St. Louis, Missouri, from the Gateway Arch to Union Station

== Elsewhere ==
- Gateway Mall (Prince Albert, Saskatchewan), an enclosed mall in Prince Albert, Saskatchewan, Canada
- Gateway Mall (Quezon City), Cubao, Quezon City, Philippines

== See also ==
- Gateway Theatre of Shopping, Umhlanga, KwaZulu-Natal
