= Growthpoint Properties =

South African property company

- Type: Public
- Traded as: JSE: GRT
- ISIN: ZAE000179420
- Industry: Real estate investment
- Founded: 1987; 39 years ago
- Headquarters: Sandton, Gauteng, South Africa, Sandton
- Number of locations: 388 (2025)
- Area served: South Africa; Australia; Romania; Poland
- Key people: Rhidwaan Gasant (Chairman); Norbert Sasse (CEO)
- Revenue: ▲ R14.4 billion (2024)
- Operating income: ▼ R8.7 billion
- Net income: ▼ (R1.4 billion)
- Total assets: ▼ R165.73 billion (2024)
- Total equity: ▼ R68.27 billion (2024)
- Number of employees: 600+ (2025)
- Divisions: Growthpoint Australia; Lango; Globalworth
- Website: growthpoint.co.za

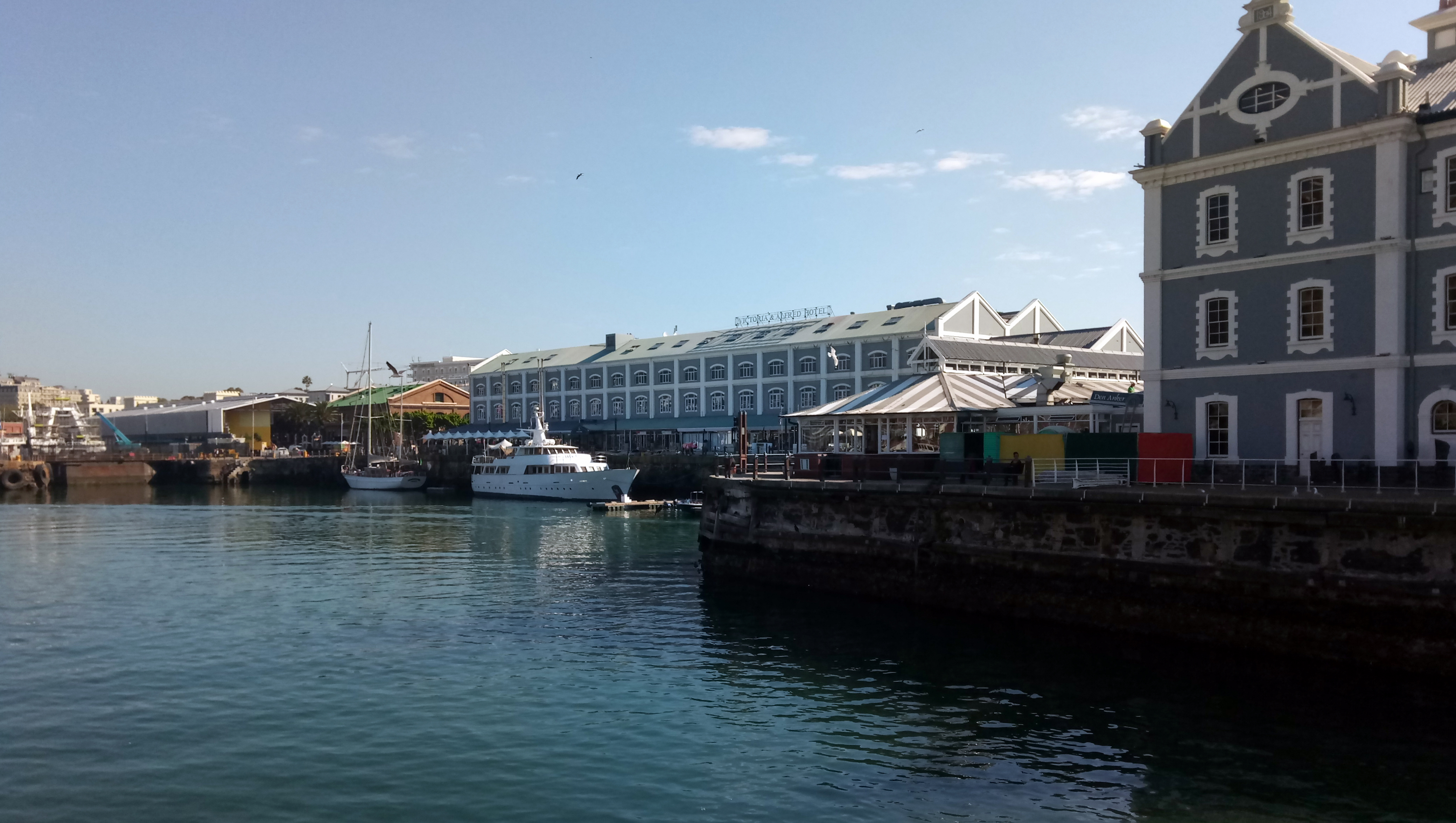
Part of the V&A Waterfront in Cape Town, a flagship property co-owned by Growthpoint and the South African Government Employees Pension Fund

Growthpoint (officially Growthpoint Properties) is a South African real estate investment company, based in Sandton, Gauteng.

Founded in 1987, Growthpoint is the largest real estate investment trust (REIT) listed on the JSE Limited, South Africa's main stock exchange. It is also one of South Africa's largest companies by annual revenue, and part of the FTSE/JSE Top 40 Index.

As of 2025, the company owns 388 properties (in various sectors) across South Africa, and in 2024, it had combined property assets worth over R131 billion. It also has property investments outside of its home country, including in Australia, Romania, and Poland.

== History ==
Growthpoint was founded in 1987, with an initial JSE listing of 17 properties.

In 2014, Growthpoint Investment Partners launched 3 unlisted investments in specialist alternative real estate asset classes: African (excluding South African) income-producing commercial real estate; SA healthcare property; and SA student accommodation.

In October 2025, Growthpoint began integrating wheeled renewable energy to several of its properties. The goal was to develop a system that would ensure a stable power supply, accurate cost allocation and verifiable green attributes, to the benefit of the group's tenants. Growthpoint said at the 2025 annual South African Property Owners Association (Sapoa) convention that its renewables journey began back in 2011, with the installation of 44 kW of rooftop solar generation capacity at its Lincoln on the Lake building in uMhlanga.

== Operations ==
As of 2025, Growthpoint owns 388 properties in South Africa, and has property investments in other countries outside SA. Its properties are in residential, office, retail, industrial, healthcare, and student accommodation sectors. It is the largest real estate investment trust (REIT) in South Africa. Growthpoint also provides property trading and development services.

Among Growthpoint's property portfolio are:

- Retail: The V&A Waterfront, La Lucia Mall, Waterfall Mall, Bayside Mall, Festival Mall, Fourways Crossing, Gardens Shopping Center, Hillcrest Corner, Howard Center, Longbeach Mall, N1 City Mall, Paarl Mall, River Square, The Constantia Village, Vaal Mall, Village Square, Westville Mall
- Industrial: Trade Park, African Products, Eagle Industrial Park, Route 24, Sterling Industrial Park, Gallagher Place, Growthpoint Industrial Estate, Impala Road, Independence Square, Route 41, Wadestone Industrial Park
- Offices: The Park on 16th, The Towers, The Place, 11 Adderley, 33 Bree & 30 Waterkant, Advocates Chambers, De Waterkant Center, Inanda Greens, Lincoln On The Lake, Menlyn Corner, Oxford Corner, River Park, Sandton Close, The Annex, The Boulevard uMhlanga, The District, Waterfall Park, Woodlands Office Park
- Healthcare: Busamed Gateway Private Hospital, Busamed Hillcrest Private Hospital, N1 Hospital, Busamed Paardevlei Hospital
- Student Residential: Kingsway Place, 33 Princess Of Wales, Richmond Central, Apex Studios, Crescent Studios, Horizon Heights, Arteria

The V&A Waterfront, co-owned by Growthpoint and the Government Employees Pension Fund, is Cape Town's most-visited tourist attraction. Featuring local entrepreneurs' art and crafts, luxury hotels, a large mall with international brands, the Two Oceans Aquarium, offices, coworking space, boat tours, and conference facilities, the precinct is a strong performer in the Growthpoint portfolio. In early 2025, Growthpoint reported income growth of 16.6% from the Waterfront.

Growthpoint is headquartered in Sandton, and has regional offices in Cape Town and Durban.

== Corporate social responsibility ==
Growthpoint has formally committed to the UN Global Compact and the Ten Principles. Its environmental, social, and governance (ESG) strategy integrates the Ten Principles of the UN Global Compact on human rights, labour, environment, and anti-corruption into its operations.

In 2023, the company reported having a workforce comprising 54% females, and 66.5% people of color. Growthpoint is a Level 1 BBBEE employer.

In the same year, Growthpoint reported that it over R50 million into corporate social investment programs, which benefited 6,255 individuals. It also stated that it produced around 14,500 MwH of solar electricity, had a net zero goal for 2050, and had received 63 Green Building Certifications from 51 buildings (which amounted to 19.4% of the company's gross lettable area).

Growthpoint is a founding member of the Green Building Council & Certification (GBCSA), and in mid-2025, had 127 green buildings in its portfolio.

The company sponsors Squash SA, the South African national governing body of the sport of squash.

== Accolades ==
Growthpoint has received numerous awards for its properties over the years, including:

- 2017: GBCSA 10-Year Leadership & Best Quality Submission; SAPOA Overall Green & Special Commendation; IAS Financial Reporting
- 2018: SAPOA Office Design, Innovative Excellence, Presentation, Mixed-Use Development, Refurbishment, and Heritage
- 2019/2020: Well International Silver; CESA AON Engineering; Construction World Best Projects; GBCSA Green Star
- 2021: SAPOA Overall Winner, Sustainability, and Heritage
- 2022: SAPOA Interiors
- 2023: SAPOA Heritage and Student Accommodation
- 2024: SAPOA Student Accommodation; GBCSA Best Quality
