= Gateway Center =

Gateway Center may refer to:

- Gateway Center Arena, a multi-purpose arena in the College Park, Georgia, Gateway Center commercial complex
- Gateway Center (PAT station), a station in Pittsburgh, Pennsylvania
- Gateway Center (Pittsburgh), a building complex in Pittsburgh, Pennsylvania
- Gateway Center (Collinsville), a convention center in Collinsville, Illinois
- Gateway Center (Newark), a commercial complex in Newark, New Jersey
- West Hollywood Gateway Project, a shopping center in West Hollywood, California
- Gateway Center (Pinellas Park), an office park and development in Pinellas Park, Florida, which includes an Army Reserve-Florida National Guard joint training facility
- Gateway Center (Brooklyn), a shopping complex in Brooklyn, New York
- Bronx Terminal Market, a shopping center in the western Bronx, New York formerly known as "Gateway Center"
- Gateway Transportation Center, a station in St. Louis, Missouri

== See also ==
- The Gateway (disambiguation)
