= Gateway Theatre =

Gateway Theatre may refer to:

- Gateway Theater (Chicago), Illinois, United States
- Gateway Theatre (Chester), England
- Gateway Theatre (Edinburgh), Scotland
- Gateway Theatre (Richmond), British Columbia, Canada
- Gateway Theatre (Singapore)

== See also ==
- Gateway Theatre of Shopping, a shopping centre north of Durban, South Africa
