= The Ranch Resort =

Hospitality resort in Limpopo, South Africa

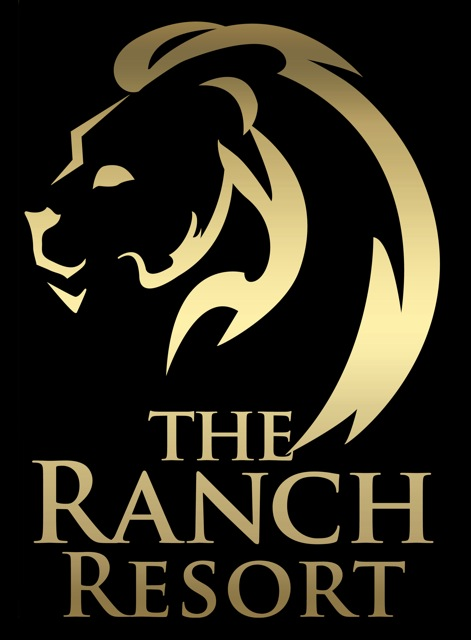

- Location within South Africa

General information
- Location: Limpopo, South Africa
- Coordinates: 24°2′34.55″S 29°16′28.15″E
- Opening: 1960; 66 years ago
- Owner: Shearer Family

Other information
- Number of rooms: 150
- Number of suites: 35
- Number of restaurants: 4

Website
- theranch.co.za

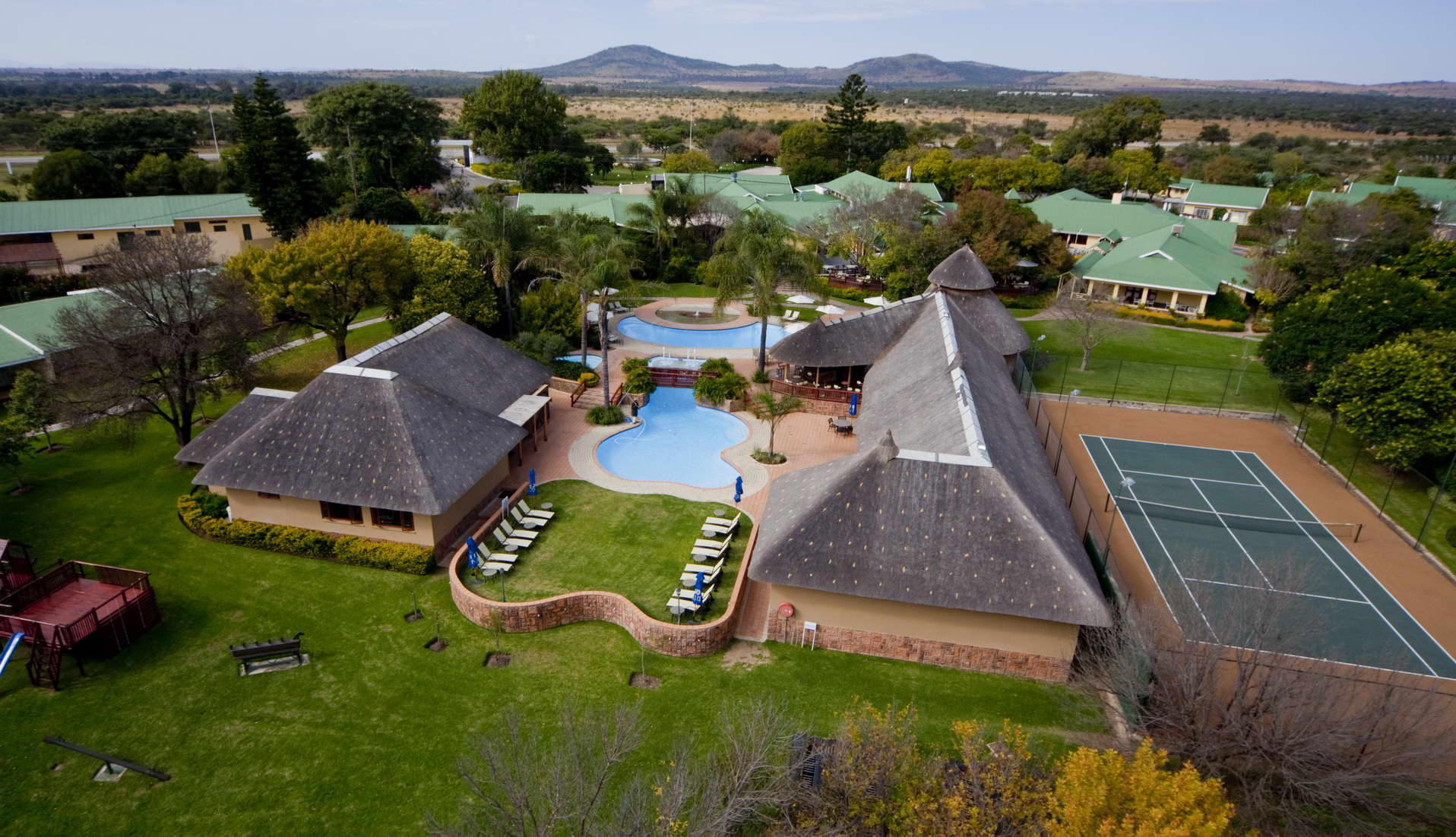
Aerial view of part of the Ranch Resort

The Ranch Resort is a leisure complex in the Capricorn District of the Limpopo Province, in South Africa. The site is located 25 km south of Polokwane, spans 1,000 hectares, and includes facilities for sports, exhibitions, conservation, accommodation, and conferencing, as well as a 12-hole golf course.

The Protea Hotel Ranch Resort hosts the SkyDiving Boogie and Symposium, an annual sports skydiving and parachuting event.

== History ==
The Shearer family established the Ranch in May 1960, as a stopover for people travelling between Zimbabwe and South Africa. As the establishment became better known, it developed into a leisure and conference resort.

In 2003 it was estimated that the economic impact of golf and related spending in Limpopo amounted to R219 million per year. To capitalise on the growing demand for executive golf facilities, The Ranch Resort developed a 12-hole par 3 executive golf course and academy. The Golf Course development was designed to harmonise with the natural bushveld surroundings. The resident golf pro is Sean Pappas, one of the three Pappas brothers and five-time Sunshine Tour event winner.

In May 2010, The Ranch celebrated 50 years in hospitality at a function where Premier of Limpopo Cassel Mathale opened the resort's new golf course and golfing academy. The Ranch's role in attracting eco-tourism to Limpopo was recognized by members of the South African Government at the event.

During the COVID-19 pandemic in South Africa, The Ranch Resort was selected by the South African government as the quarantine centre for 112 South African students, teachers and citizens being repatriated from Wuhan in China after the World Health Organization (WHO) declared COVID-19 a pandemic on 11 March 2020.

The self-contained hotel complex was selected for its remoteness, as there are no communities nearby, and because of its proximity to Polokwane International Airport, situated approximately 31km away. South African President Cyril Ramaphosa declared the Ranch Resort free of COVID-19 and a "green zone" in a speech delivered at the site in March 2020.

== Ecology ==
=== Conservation ===
The Ranch Resort stands in a 1,000-hectare (3.9 sq mi) nature conservancy, consisting of grasslands, and bushveld and is home to lions, giraffes, zebras, warthogs, kudu, impala, wildebeest, and over 200 bird species, among other animals. Active in wildlife rehabilitation since the 1960s (when organised conservation was in its infancy), the Ranch offers shelter for orphaned or injured wildlife that cannot be released into the wild. The resort provides a safe haven for lions and other Big 5 animals from Zimbabwe, during the country's political and social instability.

=== Wildlife ===
The Ranch is home to over 30 lions. Previous generations of The Ranch Resort lion prides have starred in movies including The Gods Must Be Crazy, King Solomon's Mines, Incident at Victoria Falls, The Lion Child (1993 film), Pride. The current lions and their forebears have appeared in a total of over 400 international movies, documentaries, and commercials.

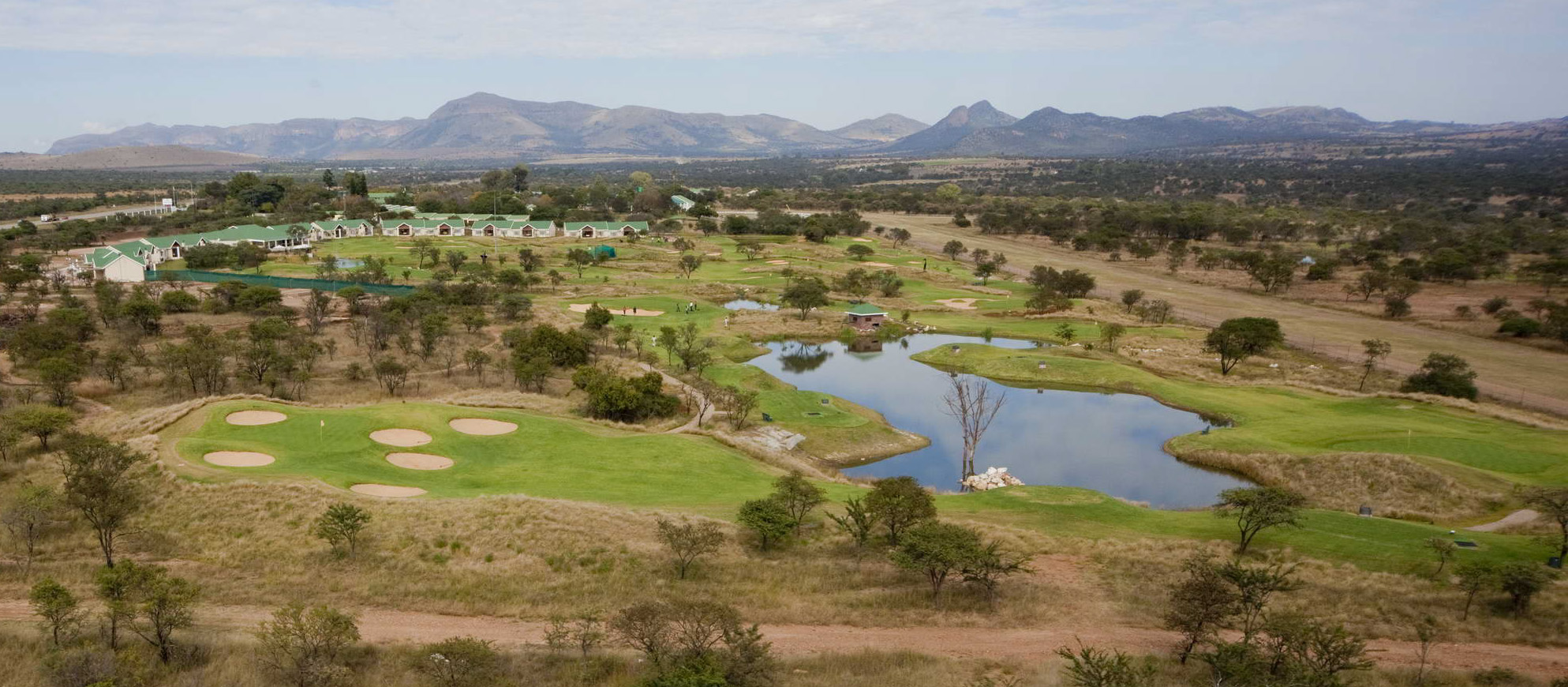
The Ranch Resort Executive Golf Course

== See also ==
- List of hotels in South Africa
