= Thanda Private Game Reserve =

Safari lodge in South Africa

Thanda Safari is a safari lodge in Umkhanyakude District Municipality (KwaZulu-Natal), South Africa. It was founded by Dan Olofsson who invested more than R 100 million in the property in 2002. The reserve was formerly a cattle farm.

== See also ==
- List of hotels in South Africa
