= Rhino Orphanage =

The Rhino Orphanage is the world's first Non-Profit Organization dedicated to the care and rehabilitation of rhinoceros calves orphaned by poaching. The orphanage is located in Limpopo Province, South Africa, of which the exact location can't be given due to security reasons.

The project was founded by Peet Cilliers and Arrie van Deventer in 2012.

== Mission and objectives ==
- To rescue orphaned and injured rhino calves
- To rehabilitate and return rhino to the wild
- To raise awareness for rhino conservation and communicate the work of The Rhino Orphanage
- To raise funds for day-to-day operations

The Rhino Orphanage educates the public against poaching. The Rhino Orphanage forms part of the rapid intervention and coordinated rescue response network where the appropriate handling, rearing and rehabilitation protocols are implemented, crucial to ensuring that the rhino orphans are rescued successfully, humanely and responsibly. At the Orphanage animals are reared in such a manner as to ensure their full rehabilitation and return to the wild.

In July 2013, The Rhino Orphanage received the world’s first bespoke rhino ambulance. The ambulance is equipped with a trailer to carry vital equipment into the bush and a specialised transporter to carry injured rhino calves back to the orphanage where they receive 24-hour medical attention.

== Partners and supporters ==
In 2012, Lafarge announced it had donated R100,000 to The Rhino Orphanage. In the same year, Build It and Spar Group donated R100,000 worth of building materials and New Holland Agriculture donated a new tractor to the project. In August 2013, New Holland launched the 'New Holland Rhino Run' campaign where a tractor was driven from Cape Town to Limpopo to raise funds for The Rhino Orphanage.

In May 2014, First Car Rental in partnership with Nissan South Africa, Lafarge, New Holland Agriculture, Legend Golf and Safari Resort and Graffiti launched the 'Post Your Selfie and Win' campaign to raise awareness for The Rhino Orphanage.

The Rhino Orphanage is further supported by a range of partners including First National Bank (South Africa), Zebediela Bricks and ATKSA.
