= Rio Casino Resort =

Casino resort in Klerksdorp, South Africa

- Interactive map of Rio Casino Resort
- Location: Klerksdorp, South Africa; 26.0239°S 28.0128°E
- Opened: May 2002
- Theme: Rio de Janeiro’s Carnival
- No. of rooms: 70
- Gaming space: 266,330 sq ft (24,743 m^{2})
- Notable restaurants: Copacabana Restaurant, F.L.A.G. Cafe
- Casino type: Land-based
- Owner: Peermont Global
- Previous names: Tusk Rio Casino Resort
- Website: www.riocasino.co.za

Rio Casino Resort (formerly known as Tusk Rio Casino Resort) is a casino and resort in Klerksdorp, Dr Kenneth Kaunda District Municipality in North West (South African province).

== History ==
Rio Casino Resort was opened in May 2002 as "Tusk Rio Casino Resort". In August 2006, Peermont Global acquired Tusk Resorts, renaming the property as "Rio Casino Resort". The acquisition of the property was made to realize a substantial increase in casino gaming and improve lodging on land where the company held gaming licenses. Shortly thereafter, a new Peermont Metcourt Rio Hotel was built adjacent to the resort along with a new convention center, Peermont's first in the area, with only one other lodging facility offering such conference facilities.

== See also ==
- List of hotels in South Africa
- List of casinos in South Africa
