= Bidvest Insurance =

South African insurance company

- Type: Subsidiary
- Industry: Financial services Insurance
- Founded: 1997; 29 years ago
- Headquarters: uMhlanga, KwaZulu-Natal, South Africa
- Area served: Southern Africa
- Key people: Phillip Donnelly Managing Director
- Services: Short-term insurance
- Number of employees: 120 (2020)
- Parent: Bidvest Group
- Website: bidvestinsurance.co.za

Bidvest Insurance is a South African short-term insurance company, and a subsidiary of the Bidvest Group. The company specializes in personal, and automotive value added insurance products.

== History ==
The company was founded in 1997 as part of McCarthy Motor Holdings, and was formerly known as McCarthy Insurance Services.

In 2004, South African diversified investment company Bidvest Group bought McCarthy Motor Holdings, and McCarthy Insurance Services subsequently became Bidvest Insurance, and formed part of the Bidvest Financial Services division.

== Regulatory membership ==
Bidvest Insurance is a member of the South African Insurance Association (SAIA) and a partner member of Southern African Travel Agents (ASATA).
