= Combined Motor Holdings =

Combined Motor Holdings Limited
- Type: Public
- Traded as: JSE: CMH
- Industry: Automotive
- Headquarters: uMhlanga, KwaZulu-Natal,, South Africa
- Area served: South Africa
- Key people: Jebb McIntosh (CEO)
- Services: Auto insurance Car rentals
- Revenue: R11.15 billion (2019)
- Operating income: R417 million (2019)
- Net income: R190 million (2019)
- Total assets: R3.65 billion (2019)
- Total equity: R813 million (2019)
- Website: cmh.co.za

Combined Motor Holdings Limited (CMH) is a South African automotive investment holding company. Headquartered in uMhlanga, KwaZulu-Natal, the company is listed on the JSE Limited.

== History ==
Combined Motor Holdings was founded by Jebb McIntosh and Maldwyn Zimmerman in 1976. The company began as a Chevrolet and Datsun franchise motor dealership, based in KwaZulu-Natal.

In 1987, Combined Motor Holdings was listed on the Johannesburg Stock Exchange.

In 1999, Combined Motor Holdings acquired the franchise for the international vehicle rental groups National and Alamo and restructured the companies as National Alamo within Combined Motor Holdings. In 2008, CMH restructured its car rental business again, registering the subsidiary First Car Rental and also acquiring a service contract to operate the Germany-based, Sixt rent a car, in South Africa.

In 2006, Thebe Investment Corporation, a Black Economic Empowerment company based in South Africa, acquired a 15% stake in Combined Motor Holdings for R294 million, the equivalent of R93 per share.

== Operations ==
CMH's business units include First Car Rental, Green Machine, NWE Workshop Equipment, and CMH Fleet Solutions.

=== NWE Workshop Equipment ===
NWE Workshop Equipment is a supplier of bulk lubrication management systems, workshop equipment and bulk oil management systems in South Africa. NWE Workshop Equipment is located in Pinetown, Durban, South Africa.

=== CMH Fleet Solutions ===
CMH Fleet Solutions is the fleet division of Combined Motor Holdings Limited. The company engages in fleet leasing, maintenance, fuel management, accident management, fleet administration, driver management and security.

=== Automotive dealerships ===
CMH operates a commercial truck dealership, and is a licensed dealer for several automotive brands in South Africa, including Ford, Datsun, Haval, Honda, Isuzu, Jaguar, Land Rover, Lexus, Mazda, Mitsubishi, Nissan, Opel, Renault, Subaru, Suzuki, Toyota, and Volvo.

=== First Car Rental ===
First Car Rental is the car rental subsidiary of Combined Motor Holdings Limited. First Car Rental operates out of 49 branches in South Africa. First Car Rental is a SAVRALA member (South African Vehicle Rental and Leasing Association). The company is listed as one of the Top 500 Best Managed Companies in South Africa. First Car Rental is the winner of the 2012 and 2013 South African Service Awards.

== See also ==
- Automotive industry in South Africa
