= Umhlanga Rocks Lighthouse =

Lighthouse in Umhlanga, South Africa

Coordinates: 29°43′43″S 31°05′17″E

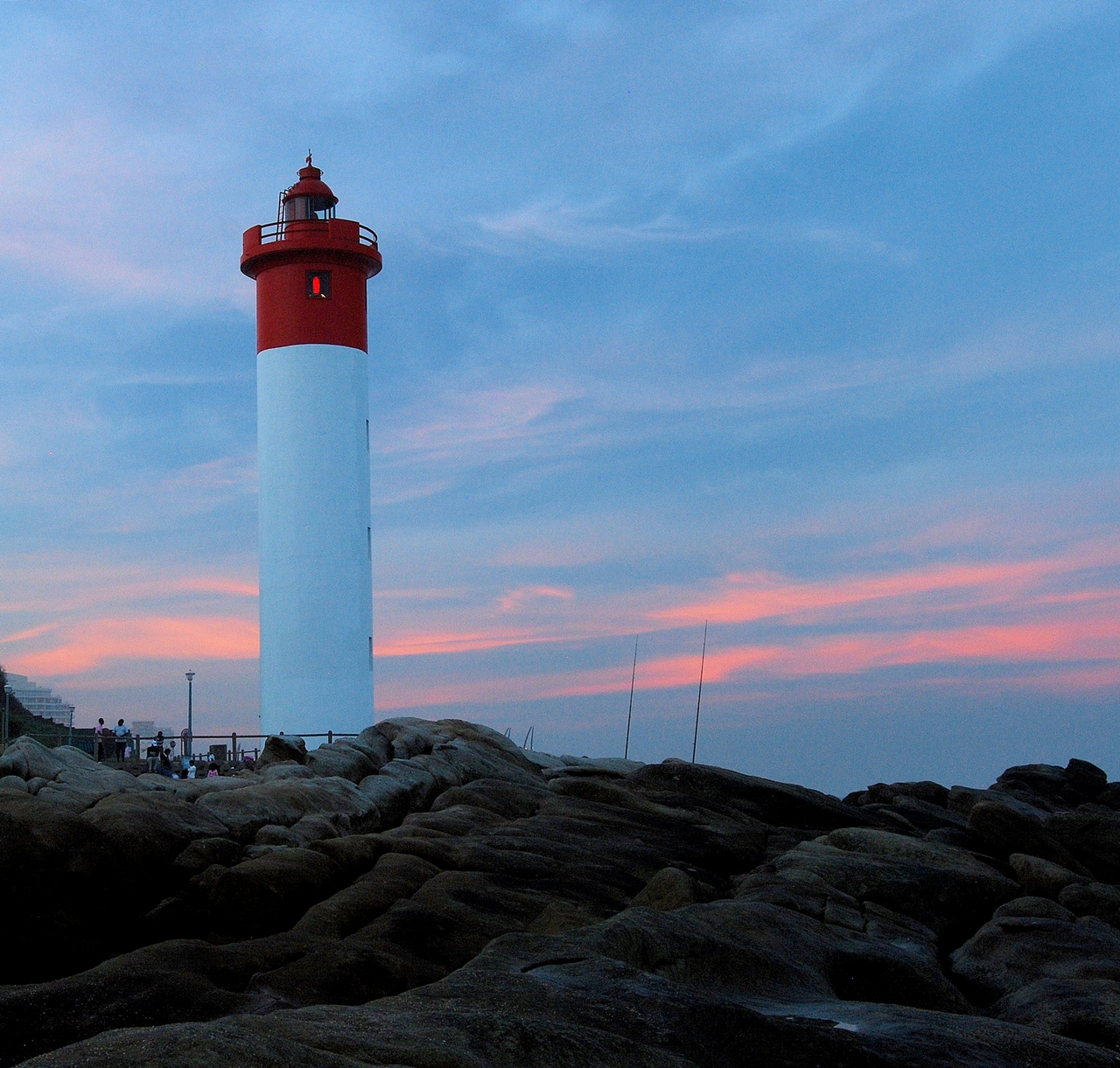

The uMhlanga Rocks Lighthouse was completed in 1954 and stands on the beach in uMhlanga, KwaZulu-Natal. It is unmanned and active. The round concrete tower is white below and red above. The lighthouse is 21 m high and has a focal plane of 25 m above the high water mark.

The tower has a 600,000 CD electric light, which is mounted on a rotating system and can be seen 24 nautical miles away, as well as a fixed red light. The red light enables ships outside Durban Harbor to monitor their position. If the red light can be seen, the ship is too close to shore.

== See also ==
- List of lighthouses in South Africa
