= First Car Rental =

South African car rental company

First Car Rental is the wholly owned car rental subsidiary of Combined Motor Holdings Limited (CMH), a JSE-listed investment holding company based in South Africa.

First Car Rental operates out of 60 branches in South Africa and employs over 500 people. First Car Rental’s fleet consists of several vehicle manufacturers including Ford, Nissan, Opel, Chevrolet, Toyota, Renault, Mercedes, BMW, Fiat, Honda and Volkswagen. First Car Rental was first listed as one of the Top 500 Best Managed Companies in South Africa in 2014. The company has over 9,000 rental vehicles in use in South Africa.

== History ==
CMH acquired the franchise for the international vehicle rental groups National and Alamo in 1999 and restructured the companies as National Alamo within CMH. In 2008, Europcar purchased the franchise rights to the National Alamo brand in Europe, Asia and Africa. This led to CMH restructuring its car rental business in South Africa and registering the subsidiary First Car Rental.

== Partners ==
In Europe, First Car Rental is partnered with Sixt rent a car, which services over 100 different countries.

In August 2014, FlySafair announced First Car Rental as their official car rental partner in South Africa.

== Corporate social responsibility ==
First Car Rental supports The Rhino Orphanage – the world’s first NPO engaged in care and rehabilitation of baby rhino orphaned by poaching.

In 2013, First Car Rental launched their transport service for students with disabilities at the University of the Free State. and sponsored two vehicles for WetNose Animal Shelter in Pretoria.

== See also ==
- Agency Rent-a-Car
