= Agency Rent-a-Car =

Former American rental car company

Agency Rent-a-Car was founded in Solon, Ohio (a suburb of Cleveland) as the nation's first "Insurance Replacement" car rental company by Sam J. Frankino in 1969.

== Specialty ==
Agency Rent-a-Car specialized in delivering cars to people whose personal vehicles had been in an accident and needed a temporary replacement, usually paid for by their insurance company. The company eventually grew to have offices nationwide and a fleet of 40,000 cars until being sold to Avis. The company also opened wholly owned subsidiaries known as Amerex Rent-a-Car and Altra Auto Rental.
