= SA Home Loans =

- Company type: Private
- Industry: Financial services
- Founded: February 1999
- Headquarters: uMhlanga, eThekwini Metropolitan Municipality, KwaZulu-Natal, South Africa
- Key people: Rob Kelso CEO
- Products: Mortgages, Credit Life Insurance, Home-owners Insurance, Personal Loans
- Website: Homepage

SA Home Loans is a South African mortgage finance company and mortgage insurance provider. Founded in February 1999, the company is headquartered in uMhlanga, KwaZulu-Natal. Its services cover origination and credit approval through to registration and ongoing loan servicing.

SA Home Loans is an independent, non-bank home loans provider that has played a pioneering role in creating a more diverse financial infrastructure in South Africa (SA).

SA Home Loans (Pty) Ltd (SAHL) began as a start-up operation in 1999, and has persisted in the midst of entrenched competition and global financial turmoil. It has become SA’s 5th-largest – and largest non-bank – home loan provider. It services a large mortgage portfolio – having originated in excess of R140 billion (approx. US$10 billion) – and has enabled home ownership for more than 300,000 clients.

As a non-bank home loan provider, SAHL pioneered new techniques for raising funding from the South African markets to fund its loan portfolios (securitisation).

As a specialist home loan provider, its operations cover the full spectrum of home financing: from its own sales force for origination, in-house credit structures, through to ongoing client and loan servicing and related insurance products.
