= Gateways (video game) =

2012 platform-adventure video game

- Developer: Smudged Cat Games
- Publisher: Smudged Cat Games
- Platforms: Microsoft Windows, OS X, Linux, iOS, Xbox 360
- Release: WW: September 13, 2012
- Genres: Platform-adventure, Metroidvania
- Mode: Single-player

Gateways is a 2012 action-adventure platform game created by British indie studio Smudged Cat Games. It is a mixture of gameplay concepts from the Portal and Metroid series.

== Plot ==
The player character is Ed, a scientist who must take back control of his laboratory from a band of robotic monkeys.

== Gameplay ==
Gateways is a side-scrolling game in which the player controls Ed as he makes his way through his maze-like laboratory. The player is equipped with a gateway gun that functions much like the portal gun in Portal, creating holes in walls, which the player can pass between. This mechanic is the basis of most of the game's puzzles. Throughout the adventure, the player will acquire additional gateway guns, featuring new abilities; by the end of the game, the player will be able to control time, gravity, and Ed's size.

== Reception ==
Gateways received mixed reviews, currently sitting at 72/100 on Metacritic. Eurogamer scored the game 7/10, calling it a "stellar, well thought out puzzle gem on paper, and a tiny tragedy in practice." However, it also acknowledged that "[t]he esoteric nature of the game won't be to everyone's taste". PC Gamer awarded it 79/100, but criticized the navigation of the world, focusing specifically on "annoying bottlenecks [that] force you to solve the same fiddly problem with every pass", and also wrote negatively of "[t]he platforming itself ... [which] doesn't feel deftly defined." However, despite calling the game "[f]ugly and frustrating", the magazine concluded that Gateways was "a game of rare and rarely compromised ingenuity, and that alone makes its challenge worth accepting." Edge gave the game 8/10, praising it as "an unusually warm and charming entry in an occasionally clinical genre, [which] escapes from the shadow of its obvious inspiration with no small amount of ingenuity."
