= UMhlanga Lagoon Nature Reserve =

Nature reserve in South Africa

uMhlanga Lagoon Nature Reserve
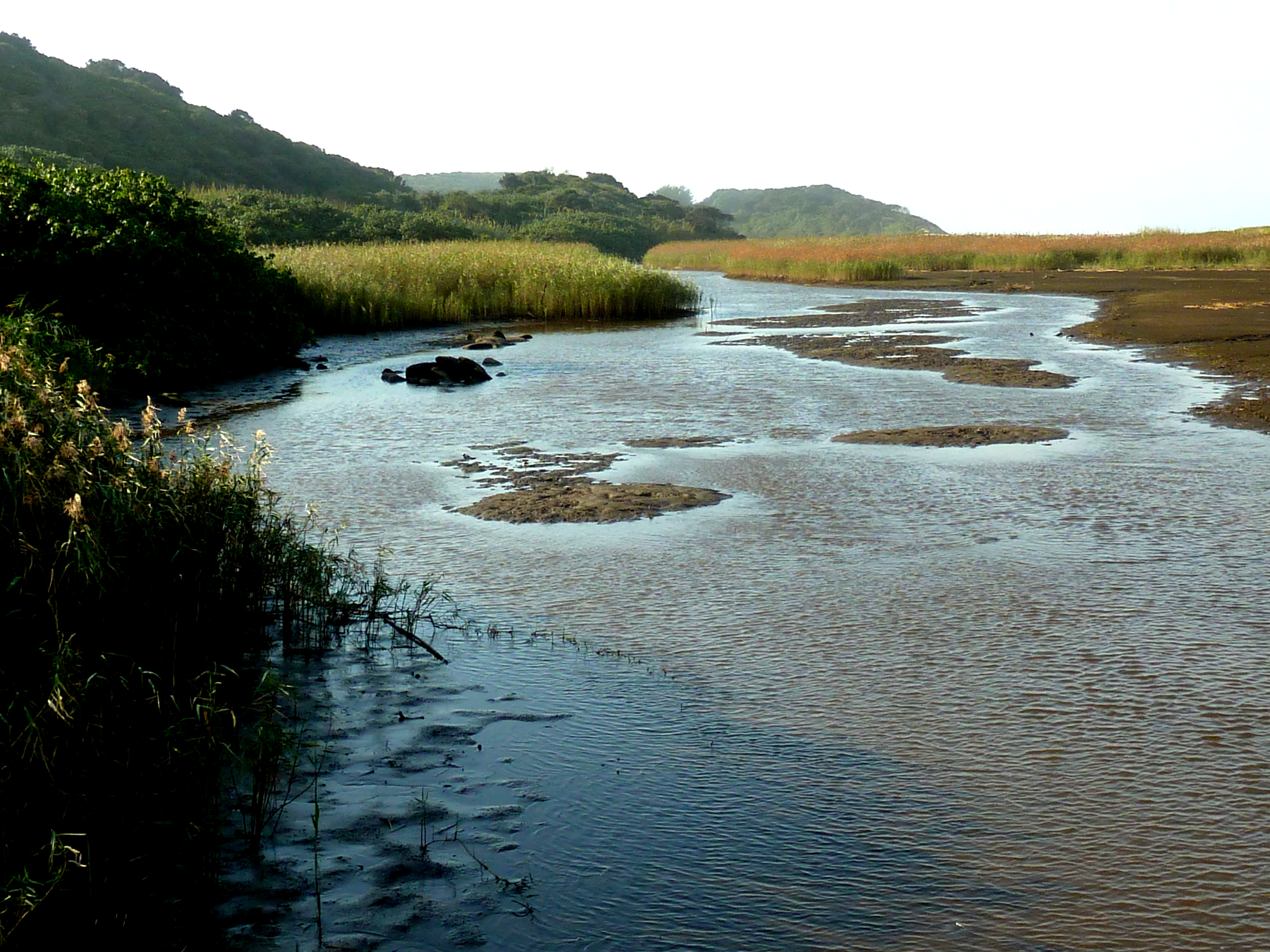
- Southern extension of the Ohlanga river lagoon

- Location within South Africa
- Coordinates: 29°42′33″S 31°05′51″E
- Area: 26 hectares (64 acres)

uMhlanga Lagoon is a 26 hectares (64 acres) nature reserve on the shore of the Indian Ocean at uMhlanga Rocks, South Africa. The reserve encloses the Ohlanga River's lagoon and mouth. The forest forms a natural extension of the less accessible Hawaan Forest, of which the greater part lies inland of the busy M4 road. The reserve trails start at a car park at the northern end of Lagoon Drive, uMhlanga.

The reserve has picnic sites, the remains of a prehistoric shell midden and walking trails, with a walkway and pedestrian bridge that span the lagoon.

At the mouth of the Ohlanga lagoon, there is a popular but unofficial nudist beach. Increased use of the area by non-nudist walkers and families resulted in complaints about nudism and antisocial behaviour. The area was at one time a ‘no-go’ area, due to a serious crime problem.

== Notes and references ==
- Bainbridge, James (2010). South Africa Lesotho and Swaziland. Lonely Planet. ISBN 978-1-74220-375-1.
- Ballard, Sebastian (1998). South Africa Handbook. Footprint Handbooks. ISBN 978-0-8442-4966-7.
- Beater, B. E.; Maud, R. R. (Apr 1963). "The Occurrence of a Coastal Midden near Umhlanga Rocks, Natal". The South African Archaeological Bulletin. 18 (69). South African Archaeological Society: 21–23. doi:10.2307/3887491. JSTOR 3887491.
- Steele, Robert (2012). Naked Magazine's Worldwide Guide to Naked Places. The Nazca Plains Corporation. ISBN 978-1-61098-305-1.

Media related to Umhlanga Lagoon Nature Reserve at Wikimedia Commons
