= Gateway Bridge (disambiguation) =

Gateway Bridge may refer to:

- Sir Leo Hielscher Bridges or Gateway Bridge, in Brisbane, Queensland, Australia
- Gateway International Bridge, a bridge between Brownsville, Texas, United States and Matamoros, Tamaulipas, Mexico
- Thames Gateway Bridge, a proposed new crossing of the River Thames, in east London, England
- Gateway Bridge (Illinois-Iowa), over the Mississippi River, in Clinton, Iowa, United States
- Gateway Bridge (Michigan), in Taylor, Michigan
- Korean War Veterans Memorial Bridge or Gateway Bridge, in Nashville, Tennessee, U.S.

== See also ==
- Gateway to the Americas International Bridge, a bridge over the Rio Grande (Río Bravo), between Laredo, Texas, United States and Nuevo Laredo, Tamaulipas, Mexico
