= Gateway Church =

Gateway Church may refer to:

- Gateway Church (Texas), a non-denominational Charismatic Christian megachurch in Southlake, Texas, United States
- Gateway Community Church, a diversified denomination church in Baguio City, Philippines
- Gateway Church, Leeds, an Evangelical church in Leeds, West Yorkshire, England
