= Ohlanga River =

Ohlanga River uMhlanga (in Zulu), Umhlanga, Mhlanga
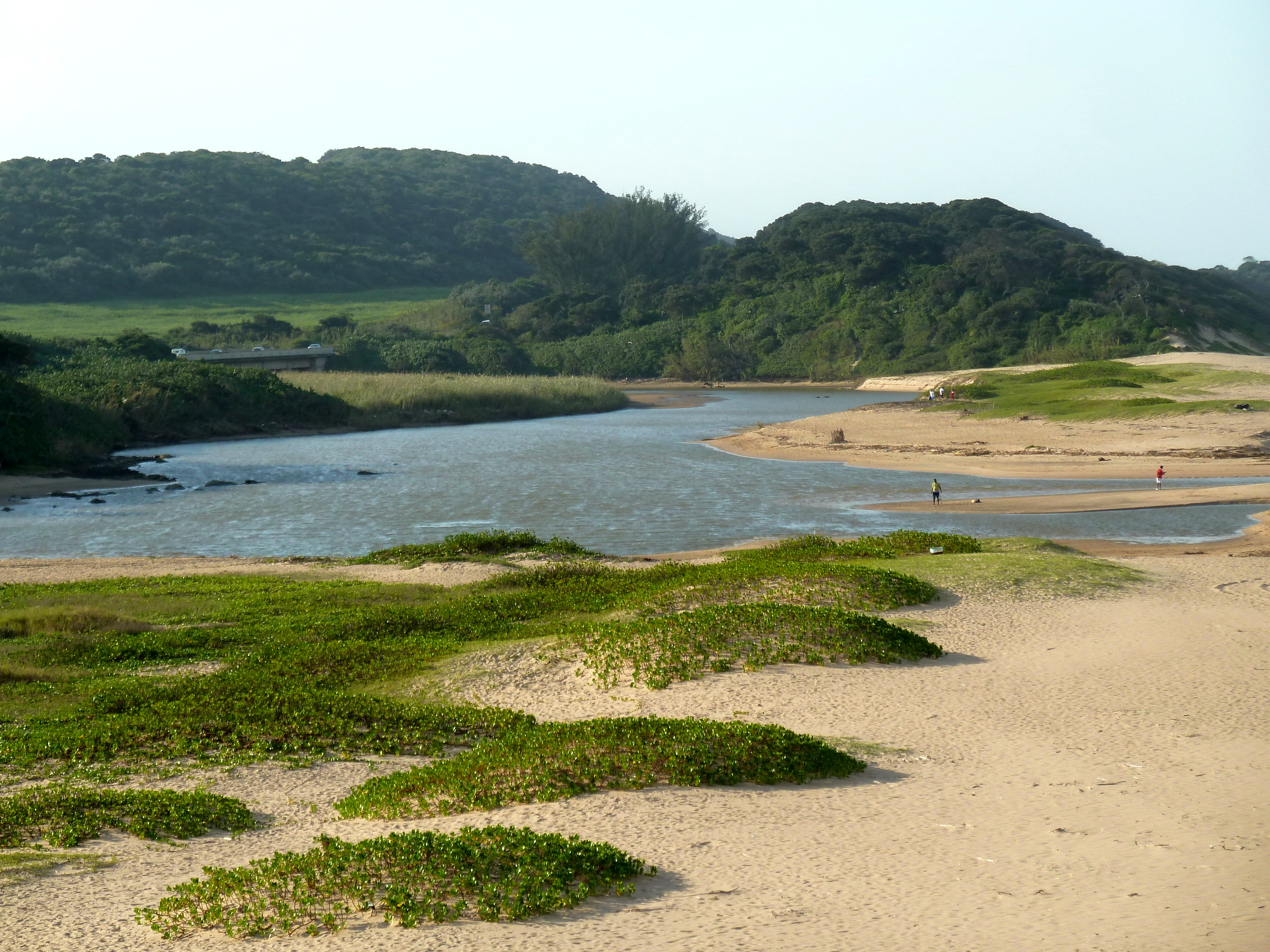

- Location of the Ohlanga River mouth
- Etymology: Named after the Zulu word for "reed"

Location
- Country: South Africa
- Region: KwaZulu-Natal

Physical characteristics
- Mouth: Indian Ocean
  - location: North of uMhlanga Rocks
  - coordinates: 29°42′9″S 31°6′0″E
  - elevation: 0 m (0 ft)
- Length: 28 km (17 mi)

The Ohlanga River is a river in KwaZulu-Natal, South Africa, which empties into the Indian Ocean just north of uMhlanga, north of Durban. The river has extensive reed beds in the estuary at its mouth, which is only 7 km southwest from the mouth of the uMdloti River. Presently, this river is part of the Mvoti to Umzimkulu Water Management Area.

== Umhlanga conservancy ==
At the river's mouth, a lagoon is surrounded by the Umhlanga Conservancy. This area includes a 26-hectare (64-acre) uMhlanga Lagoon Nature Reserve, and a waste treatment works which is publicly accessible. This area contains bushbuck, blue and grey duiker, and numerous birds, including the southernmost occurrence of crested guineafowl.

== See also ==
- List of rivers of South Africa
- List of estuaries of South Africa
