= Dis-Chem =

Pharmacy chain in South Africa

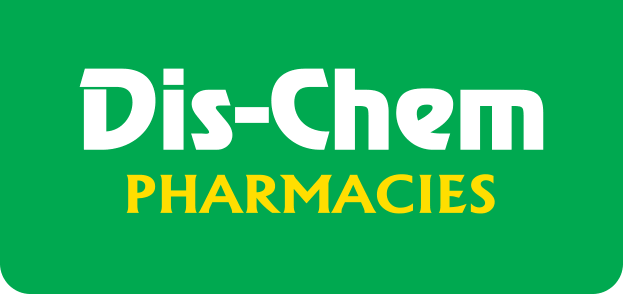
- Trade name: Dis-Chem Pharmacies
- Type: Public
- Traded as: JSE: DCP
- ISIN: ZAE000227831
- Industry: Retail
- Founded: 1978; 48 years ago
- Founder: Lynette Saltzman; Ivan Saltzman
- Headquarters: Midrand, Gauteng, South Africa
- Number of locations: 300+ (2025)
- Area served: South Africa; Namibia; Botswana
- Revenue: R 39.17 billion (2025)
- Operating income: R 2.1 billion (2025)
- Net income: R 1.22 billion (2025)
- Total assets: R 19.26 million (2025)
- Total equity: R 5.23 million (2025)
- Number of employees: 18,500 (2025)
- Website: www.dischem.co.za

Dis-Chem Pharmacies Limited, commonly known as Dis-Chem, is the second-largest retail pharmacy chain in South Africa, operating over 300 stores across Southern Africa. The company offers a wide range of products, including third-party and private label items, both in-store and online, and operates a wholesale division. The company's head office is based in Midrand, Gauteng and is listen on the JSE under the ticker symbol as DCP.

== History ==
Dis-Chem was founded in 1978 by pharmacists Ivan and Lynette Saltzman. The pharmacy opened its first retail pharmacy in Mondeor, a southern suburb of Johannesburg. The couple introduced the concept of a discount pharmacy, offering product categories that were previously unavailable in South African pharmacies due to restrictive legislation.

In 2014, Dis-Chem expanded internationally by opening its first store outside South Africa, in Windhoek, Namibia. In November 2016, the company listed 27.5% of its share capital on the Johannesburg Stock Exchange, raising approximately R 4.4 billion in what was then the second-largest initial public offering in the exchange's history. Following the IPO, Dis-Chem announced plans to double its number of outlets by 2021, with one-third of its stores being less than three years old at the time.

== Criticism ==
In July 2020, the Competition Commission of South Africa found Dis-Chem guilty of inflating prices of certain hygiene products, such as disposable face masks, during the COVID-19 pandemic. The Tribunal imposed an administrative penalty of R 1.2 million, significantly lower than the R 2 billion fine the Commission had initially sought. Dis-Chem chose not to appeal the decision, citing concerns over reputational harm.

== See also ==
- Clicks Group
- Health care in South Africa
- List of companies traded on the JSE
