= Sorbet (South Africa) =

South African beauty salon chain

- Type: Subsidiary
- Industry: Beauty
- Founded: 2005; 21 years ago
- Founder: Ian Fuhr
- Headquarters: Cape Town, South Africa
- Number of locations: 200+ (2025)
- Area served: South Africa
- Brands: Sorbet (salons); Sorbet Nailbar; Sorbet Hairbar; Sorbet MAN; Candi&Co
- Services: Beauty salon services
- Parent: Clicks
- Website: sorbet.co.za

Sorbet (officially Sorbet Group) is a South African chain of beauty salons, owned by major retail company Clicks. Founded in 2005, the chain is headquartered in Cape Town, and operates over 200 stores across South Africa.

== History ==
Sorbet was founded in 2005, by South African businessman Ian Fuhr. He bought and rebranded six existing beauty salons with the proceeds of selling his Super Mart store brand to Edcon Group.

In 2015, major South African retail chain Clicks bought a 25% shareholding in Sorbet Brands, which holds the Sorbet intellectual property.

In 2017, Sorbet was acquired by public company Long4Life. The latter was then acquired by Old Mutual Private Equity.

After 14 years, founder Ian Fuhr left Sorbet in February 2019, to found a new company (The Hatch Institute).

In November 2022, South African retail company Clicks announced that it would be buying Sorbet Holdings from Old Mutual Private Equity for R105 million. At the time, the chain had over 190 stores. Clicks said that the Sorbet brand had a natural strategic fit with its existing stores.

As part of the Clicks acquisition, customers would begin to be able to earn rewards points at Sorbet using Clicks ClubCard. Furthermore, a new range of Sorbet-branded products was launched in Clicks and Sorbet stores exclusively.

Clicks' purchase of Sorbet was approved by the South African Competition Commission with conditions, which included the advancement of black ownership across the Sorbet franchises, increasing local manufacturing of Sorbet-branded goods, and specific training of Sorbet staff. Clicks did not acquire Sorbet Independent Salons, which would operate independently from the franchise. Clicks also agreed to fund the startup costs for at least five Sorbet franchisees from historically disadvantaged groups.

== Operations ==
The company operates over 200 stores across South Africa, under a franchise model. Stores include Sorbet (salons), Sorbet Nailbar, Sorbet Hairbar, Sorbet MAN, and Candi&Co.

As of 2025, Sorbet performs 3.6 million beauty treatments per year, across all of its stores. The company supplies products from numerous international personal care brands.
