= Gateway Tower =

Gateway Tower or Gateway Towers may refer to the following:

- Gateway Towers, a mixed-use high-rise in Pittsburgh, Pennsylvania USA
- Gateway Tower (Cubao), an office building in the Quezon City, Philippines
- Gateway Towers Mumbai, a residential complex in India
- Gateway Tower (Chicago), a conceptual proposal for a mixed-use skyscraper in Chicago
- Gateway Mall (Araneta Center), a mall sometimes referred to as Gateway Tower Mall

== See also ==
- The Gateway (Singapore), adjacent buildings in Singapore
