= The Oyster Box (South Africa) =

Building in near Durban, South Africa

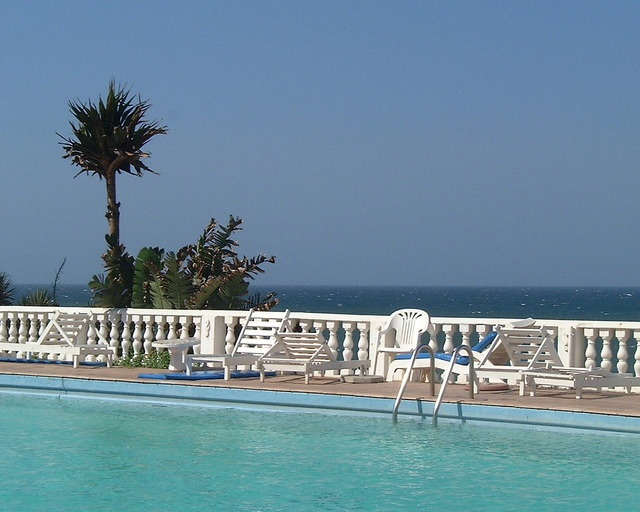

- Location within South Africa

General information
- Location: uMhlanga, near Durban, South Africa.
- Coordinates: 29°43′41″S 31°5′14″E

Website
- www.oysterboxhotel.com

The Oyster Box is a luxury five-star hotel in uMhlanga, just north of Durban, South Africa. It is known for its spa and the outdoor pools which have views on the Indian Ocean.

== History ==
The cottage, originally called Oyster Lodge, was built privately in 1863 with teak, corrugated iron and reinforced concrete. In 1952, the hotel was bought by Ken and Kay O’Connor (brother and sister) who turned it into a tea garden, then a restaurant, and finally a hotel in March 1954.

The Oyster hotel has been the official custodian of the Umhlanga lighthouse.

In 2006, the hotel, then owned by Wayne Reed, was bought by Stanley and Bea Tollman of Red Carnation Hotels. Renovation work lasted from 2007 to 2009.

In October 2016, the South African version of the Monopoly, Monopoly Mzansi, included the Oyster Box as one of the country's top 22 locations and the only hotel in the game.

== Special guests ==
In July 2011, Prince Albert II of Monaco and Princess Charlene of Monaco hosted their wedding reception at the Pearl Room and spent their honeymoon in its £4600 a night Presidential Suite.

The hotel has been visited by Princes Harry and William of the UK, and King Goodwill Zwelithini of the Zulus.

In November 2016, Tina Knowles, the mother of Beyoncé, had lunch at the Oyster Box.

== Awards ==
The Oyster Box was voted #1 top hotel in South Africa by Trip Advisor Travellers’ Choice Awards 2016.

== Controversies ==
In June 2016, the Democratic Alliance reported that SA's minister of social development Bathabile Dlamini stayed at the pricey hotel, thus questioning how the bill was paid.

== See also ==
- List of hotels in South Africa
