= The Royal Hotel (South Africa) =

Coordinates: 33.3830°S 18.8967°E

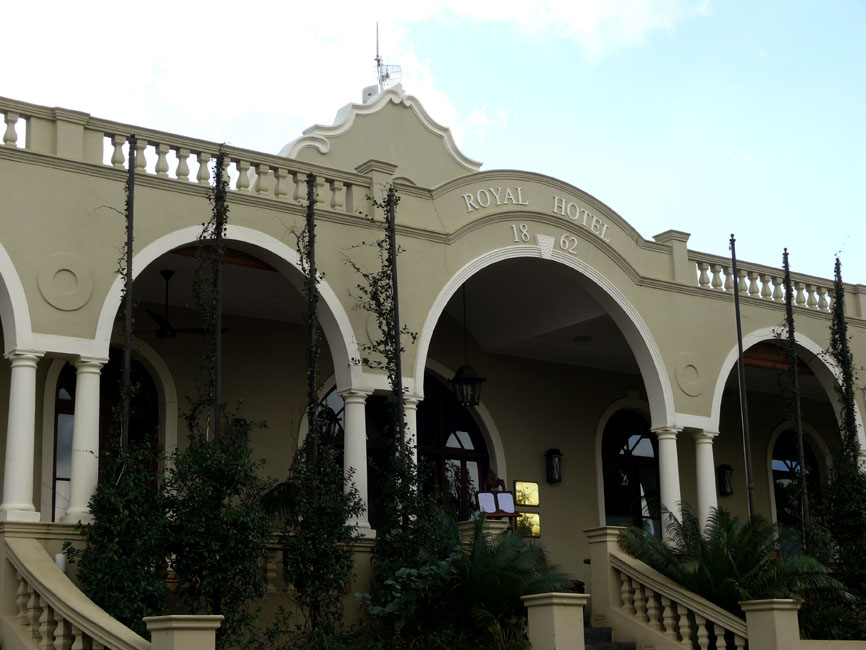
- Interactive map of the The Royal Hotel area

General information
- Type: Hotel
- Location: Riebeek Kasteel, Western Cape, South Africa
- Completed: 1862; 164 years ago

Website
- royalinriebeek.com

The Royal Hotel is a hotel located in Riebeek Kasteel, in the Western Cape province of South Africa. Built in 1862, it is the oldest licensed hotel in the province.

This now fully-restored heritage building is one of the few hotels left of that particular colonial era of South Africa. Famous visitors in history were Jan Smuts and Daniel Malan, both from the Riebeek Valley and both prime ministers of South Africa during troubled times.

In 2006, southafrica.org placed The Royal as only hotel on the list of "The 50 Most Fabulous Places to Visit in SA". According to the site, the hotel has the longest veranda south of the Limpopo.
