= Gateway, Camden =

Populated place in Camden County, New Jersey, US

Coordinates: 39.93606°N 75.10811°W

Gateway
- Neighborhood of Camden
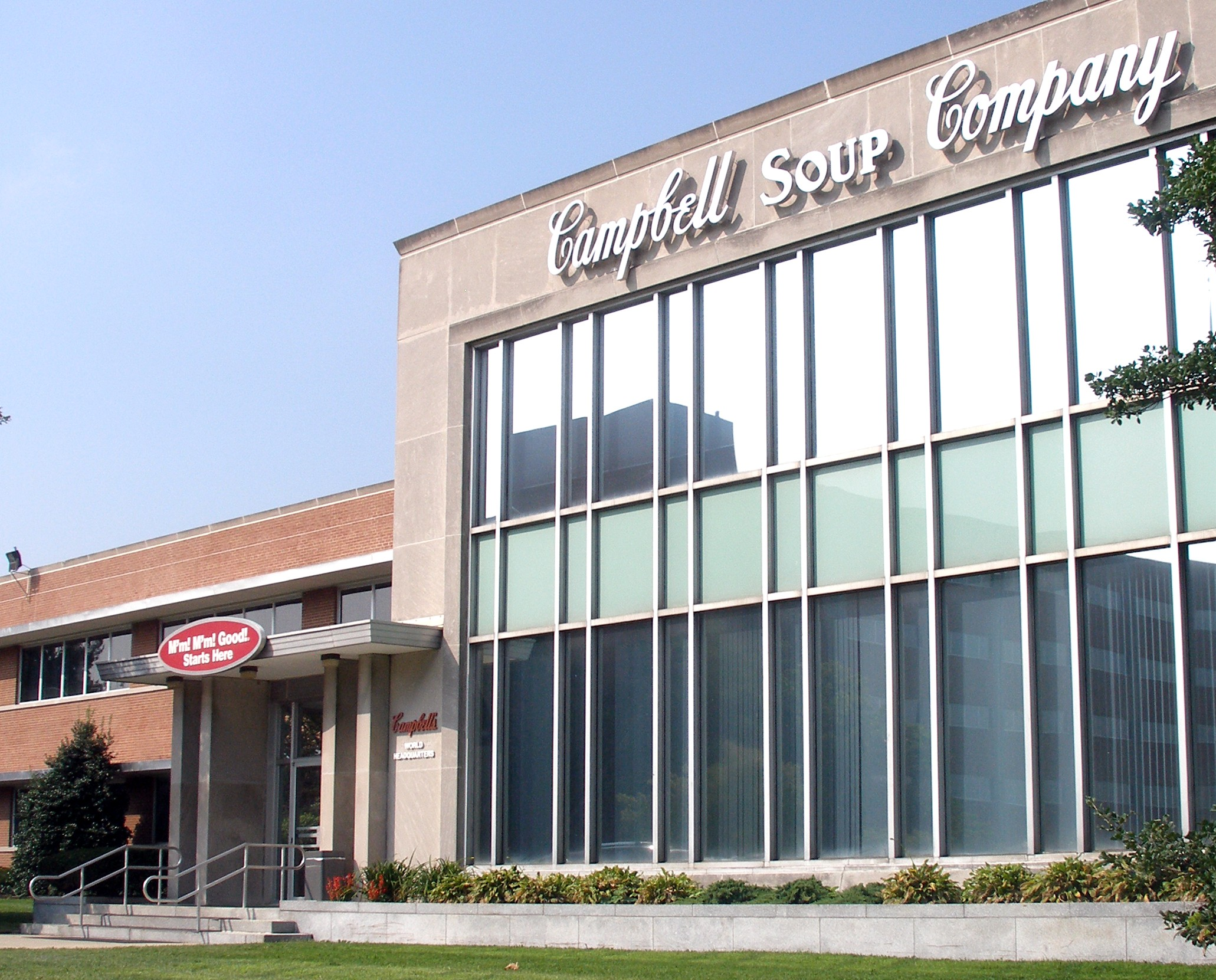
- Campbell Soup Company
- Interactive map of Gateway
- Country: United States
- State: New Jersey
- County: Camden
- City: Camden
- Area code: 856

Gateway is a neighborhood located in the central part of Camden, New Jersey. According to the 2000 United States census, Gateway has a population of 2,439.

Campbell's, Our Lady of Lourdes Medical Center and the Ferry Avenue station of the PATCO Speedline are located in Gateway.

Subaru of America moved into their new 250,000 square feet (23,000 m^{2}) headquarters in 2018.
