= Gateway Academy (Phoenix, Arizona) =

Location
- 3939 East Shea Blvd. Phoenix, Arizona 85028; United States; 33.58186°N 111.99697°W

Information
- Type: Private
- Motto: Seeking Balance
- Established: 2005
- Status: Active
- Executive director: O. Robin Sweet
- Grades: 6–12
- Age: 11 to 19
- Colors: Navy Blue, Gold
- Team name: Gateway Village Warriors
- Website: http://www.gatewayacademy.us

Gateway Academy is a private school in Phoenix, Arizona. It specializes in the education of students with autism spectrum disorders and other pervasive developmental disorders.

== Background ==
Gateway Academy was established in 2005 and offers a private education for students from 6th through 12th grade with a diagnosis on the Autism spectrum. Class size is normally 12-14.

The general curriculum includes English, Math, History, Science, Physical Education (Get Fit), and World Language Lab. Gateway Academy's first graduating class was in 2008, with one student.

== About ==
Gateway Academy states that it educates students in grades 6 through 12 who are twice exceptional with high functioning autism spectrum disorders, PDD not otherwise specified, social/behavioral issues, emotional and social difficulties and specific learning difficulties associated with spectrum disorders.

== Education ==
The school operates a year-round program from June–May of each year. Many students with autism spectrum disorders are academically very able. Every student has an individual program structured through their individual education plan (IEP), which is determined upon completing yearly assessments. This is monitored and reviewed quarterly to ensure that attainable goals are being set and measured; strengths are played to; and full potential is being met. Classes are grouped according to chronological age and ability with a maximum of ten students per class. Individualized teaching is necessary for some students in certain subjects and additional support is provided where required. Gateway Academy employs all learning modalities such as visual, auditory, kinesthetic and experiential situations as learning opportunities.
