= Gateway Academy (Laredo, Texas) =

Gateway Academy Charter High School - Sierra Vista
- 4620 South Lucy; Laredo, Webb, Texas 78046; United States

Information
- Type: Public Charter High School
- Principal: Gerardo Arambula
- Faculty: 9
- Grades: Freshman (9th) through Seniors (12th)
- Enrollment: 163 (2014–2015)
- Website: Official Website

Gateway Academy is a privately owned charter high school in Laredo, Texas, operated by the Student Alternatives Program, Inc. with two campus locations: Gateway Academy-Sierra Vista and Gateway Academy-Townlake. Gateway offers education from grades 9 through 12, offering a flexible schedule that allows students to study in either the morning or afternoon.
