= Gateway Theatre of Shopping =

Shopping centre in uMhlanga, South Africa

Coordinates: 29.725589°S 31.066547°E

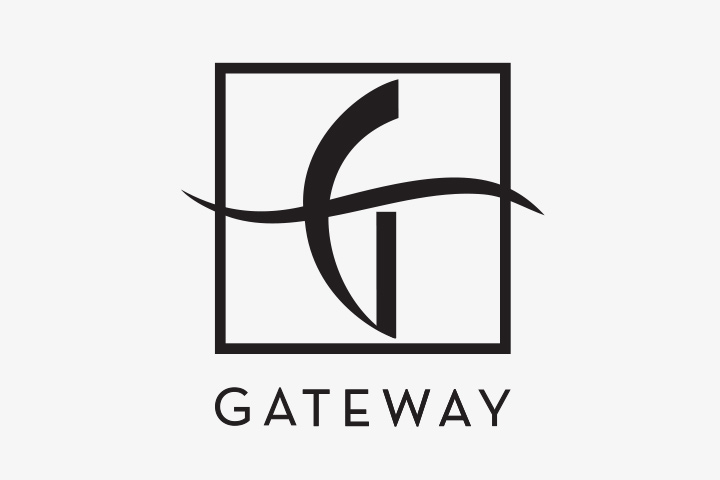

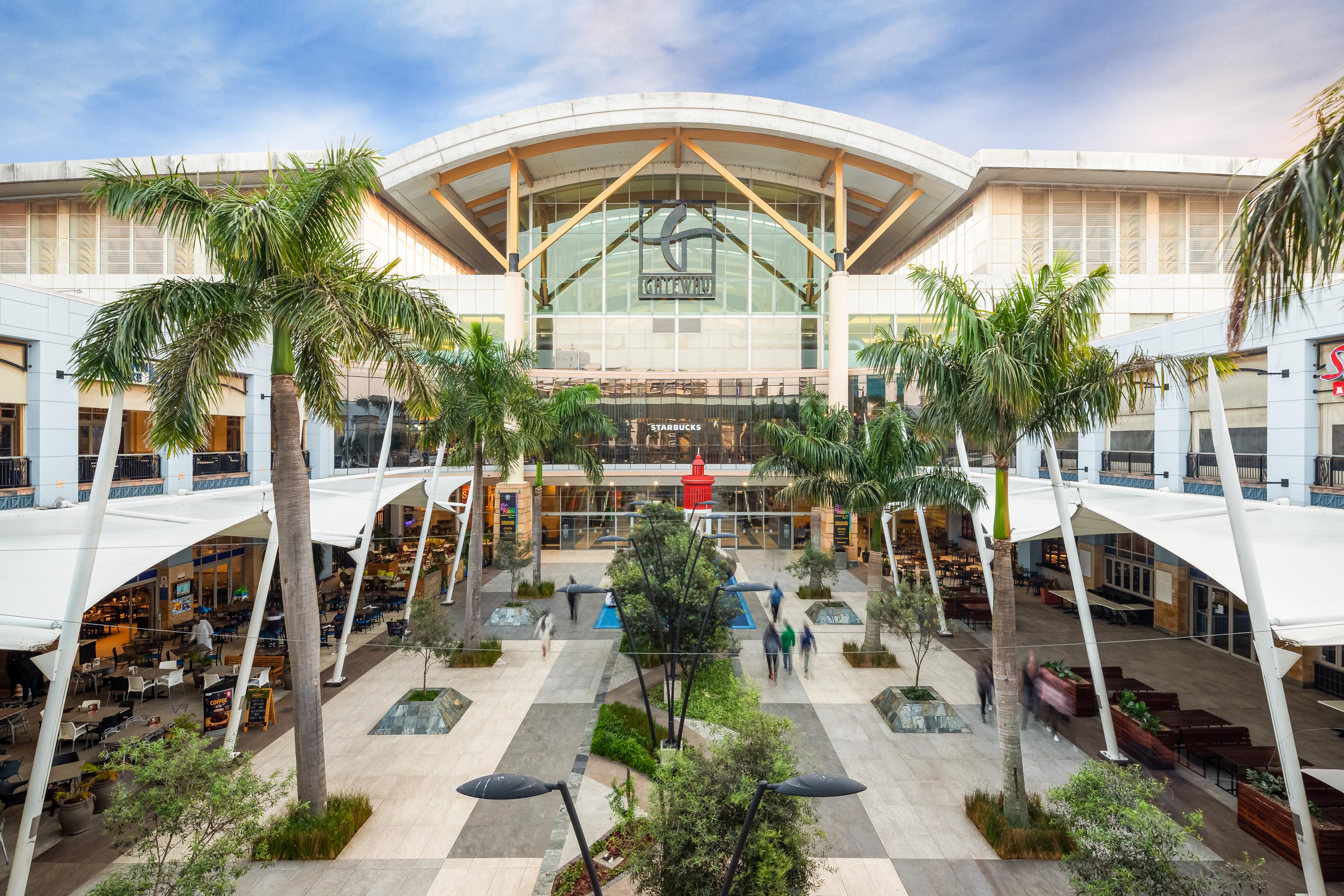
- The Palm Court at Gateway Theatre of Shopping
- Interactive map of the Gateway Theatre of Shopping area
- Alternative names: Gateway

General information
- Location: uMhlanga, KwaZulu-Natal, South Africa, 1 Palm Boulevard, uMhlanga
- Construction started: 3 March 1998
- Completed: September 2001
- Inaugurated: September 2001
- Owner: Old Mutual Property

Technical details
- Floor count: 4
- Floor area: 182,398 m^{2} (1,963,320 sq ft)

Design and construction
- Architecture firm: Johnson Murray Architects (original mall), Impendulo Design Architects (2017-2023)
- Structural engineer: Tobell Stretch
- Main contractor: Grinaker LTA (Original Mall), WBHO (Renovations)

Renovating team
- Architect: Grant Bezuidenhout
- Renovating firm: Impendulo Design Architects
- Awards: SACSC RDDA Award

Other information
- Number of stores: 450 stores
- Parking: 12,000 spaces

Website
- www.gatewayworld.co.za

Gateway Theatre of Shopping (also known simply as Gateway) is a large shopping mall located on uMhlanga Ridge in uMhlanga, KwaZulu-Natal, South Africa.

Gateway is one of the 100 largest malls in the world.

The mall sees more than two million visitors coming through its doors per month. The centre was modelled on the Mall of America and West Edmonton Mall centres and was developed by Old Mutual Properties.

The construction and opening of Gateway Theatre of Shopping has also been the driving force for many new developments in the area. Originally a sugar cane plantation, the establishment of Gateway on the site has led to the development of a new town centre and both commercial and residential developments within the region. There is also a hotel attached to the mall called the Gateway Hotel operated by AHA Hotels.

== Facilities ==
Gateway has an 18-screen Nu Metro cinema complex, as they took over the Ster-Kinekor space, and launched on October 3, 2025, with its first ScreenX in South Africa. Gateway also has 90 restaurants and more than 380 stores, an arcade and theme park, indoor fun fair, a gym, valet parking, and a vortex tunnel (the first of its kind in South Africa).
