= Clicks (South Africa) =

South African health and beauty retailer

Clicks Group Limited

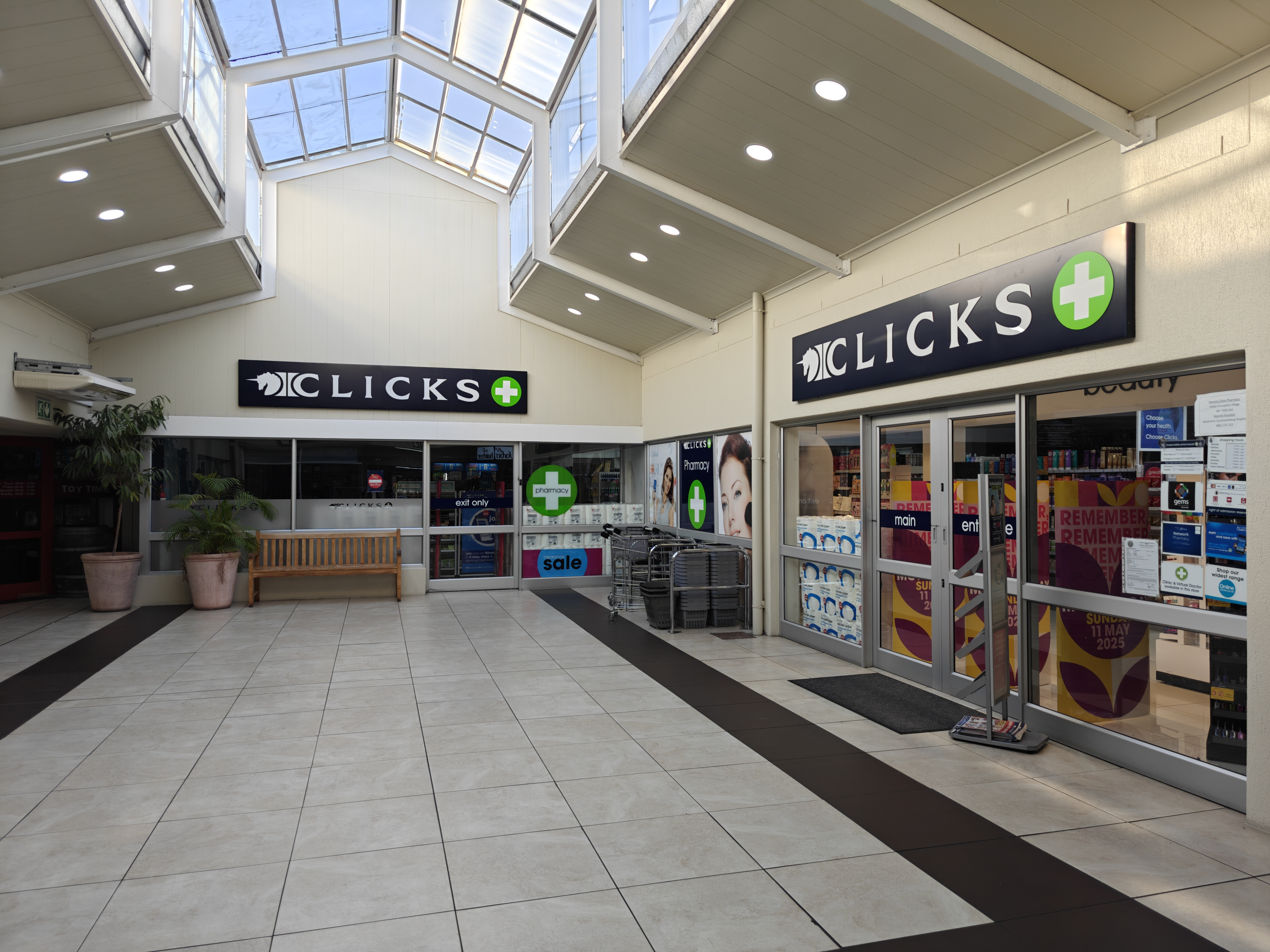
- A Clicks store in Cape Town
- Type: Public
- Traded as: JSE: CLS
- ISIN: ZAE000134854
- Industry: Retail; Healthcare
- Founded: 1968; 58 years ago
- Headquarters: Cape Town, South Africa
- Number of locations: 990+ (2025)
- Area served: Southern Africa
- Key people: Bertina Engelbrecht (CEO)
- Products: Personal care Beauty; Medication
- Revenue: ▲ R47.82 billion (2025)
- Operating income: ▲ R14.86 billion (2025)
- Net income: ▲ R4.67 billion (2025)
- Number of employees: ~ 19,700
- Divisions: Clicks; Clicks baby The Body Shop; Sorbet; UPD; M-Kem
- Subsidiaries: United Pharmaceutical Distributors (UPD)
- Website: clicks.co.za

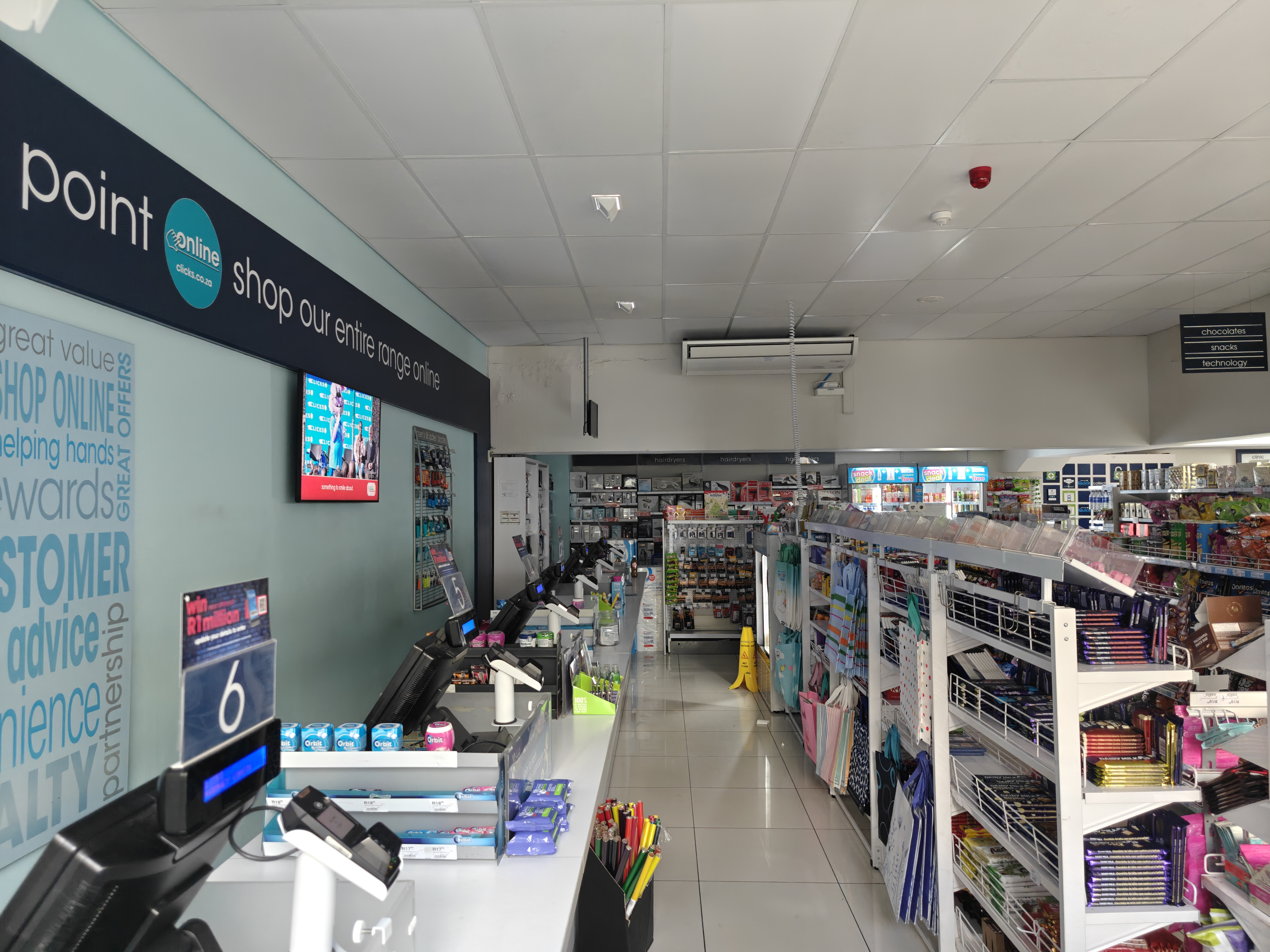
Checkout area of a Clicks store in Cape Town

Clicks (officially Clicks Group Limited) is a South African healthcare, personal care, and beauty retail chain. Headquartered in Cape Town, the company operates around 1,000 retail outlets, around 800 of which include pharmacies, across Southern Africa.

== History ==
Clicks was founded in St George's Street, Cape Town, on 6 August 1968, by retailer Jack Goldin.

The company expanded outside the Western Cape in 1971, when it opened a store in West Street, in Durban.

Clicks launched its ClubCard loyalty program (the first of its kind in Africa) in 1995.

In 2001, the company launched The Body Shop, a natural beauty product retailer that operates under a franchise agreement with The Body Shop International.

Following the 2003 changes to South African legislation which allowed for corporate pharmacy ownership, Clicks entered the retail pharmacy market with the opening of the first Clicks pharmacy in 2004, in Sea Point, Cape Town.

Also in 2003, the company was listed on the JSE Limited.

United Pharmaceutical Group (UPD) became part of the Clicks group in 2003.

Clicks acquired a courier company in 2008, to enable it to deliver medication directly to customers, across South Africa.

The group changed its name from New Clicks Holdings to Clicks Group Limited in 2009.

In 2013, Sorbet Group was established, with Clicks acquiring a 25% ownership. All of Sorbet Holdings Proprietary Limited's shares were acquired by Clicks in 2023.

American multinational health and nutrition company GNC launched in South Africa in 2014, via an exclusive partnership with Clicks.

In 2016, Clicks launched its online store, enabling customers to buy around 25,000 of its products online, as well as have them delivered to their homes, or collect in store via Click and Collect functionality The company also launched a mobile app that featured a virtual ClubCard for cash back.

In 2021, Clicks launched its Clicks baby stores.

In October 2025, Clicks announced it had plans to open 40 to 50 more stores and 40 to 50 more pharmacies in the 2026 financial year. The company said it remained committed to achieving its medium-term target of 1,200 stores. It also announced that its ClubCard rewards program had reached 12.6 million members at its 30 year anniversary, and had paid out R7.5 billion to customers over that period.

== Operations ==
Under its various divisions, Clicks operates over 1,000 retail outlets across South Africa, Namibia, Botswana, Lesotho, and Eswatini.

The distribution of its operations, as of April 2025, was as follows:

- 944 Clicks stores (890 in South Africa)
- 6 Clicks baby stores (all in South Africa)
- 55 The Body Shop stores (51 in South Africa)
- 11 Sorbet stores (all in South Africa)
- 3 retail distribution centers (all in South Africa)
- 5 UPD distribution hubs (all in South Africa).

780 of its Clicks stores - the vast majority - include a pharmacy.

The company has 24% of the South African retail pharmacy market share, and 22.7% of the country's personal care market share, as of 2025.

Some outlets include pharmacies alongside the company's personal care and beauty products. Certain Clicks pharmacies are "prescribing pharmacies", meaning they are able to issue medication that would ordinarily require someone to go to a general practitioner in person. At these pharmacies, the consumer is able to pay a fee to speak with a virtual GP, after which a pharmacist can issue medication, based on a received prescription.

Clicks has stores in Netcare hospitals and Medicross clinics - both private healthcare facility operators in South Africa.

In terms of its sales, 32.5% of revenue is derived from the beauty and personal care segment; 26.8% from pharmacies; 25.6% from front shop health and baby items; and 15.1% from general merchandise. In 2025, the front shop segment was increasing the most year-on-year.

=== Brands ===
Clicks brands include:

- Clicks (healthcare and pharmaceutical products)
- United Pharmaceutical Distributors (pharmaceutical wholesaler serving hospitals and clinics)
- The Body Shop (natural beauty products)
- Sorbet (beauty salon chain
- M-Kem (24-hour pharmacies)
- Clicks baby (baby-related products)

Over 26% of the company's sales comprise private label brands, with many of these products being made in South Africa.

=== ClubCard ===
Its loyalty program - Clicks ClubCard - is one of South Africa's largest, with 12.1 million members. Customers earn cash back on certain purchases, which they can spend on anything at Clicks Stores. Cash-back-earning products exclude prescription drugs. program has partnered with Engen gas stations to offer consumers extra cash back.

In 2024 alone, R780 million was paid to Clicks customers via its ClubCard program.

== See also ==
- Retailing in South Africa
