= UMhlanga, KwaZulu-Natal =

uMhlanga Oemsjlanga in Afrikaans orthography
- Town
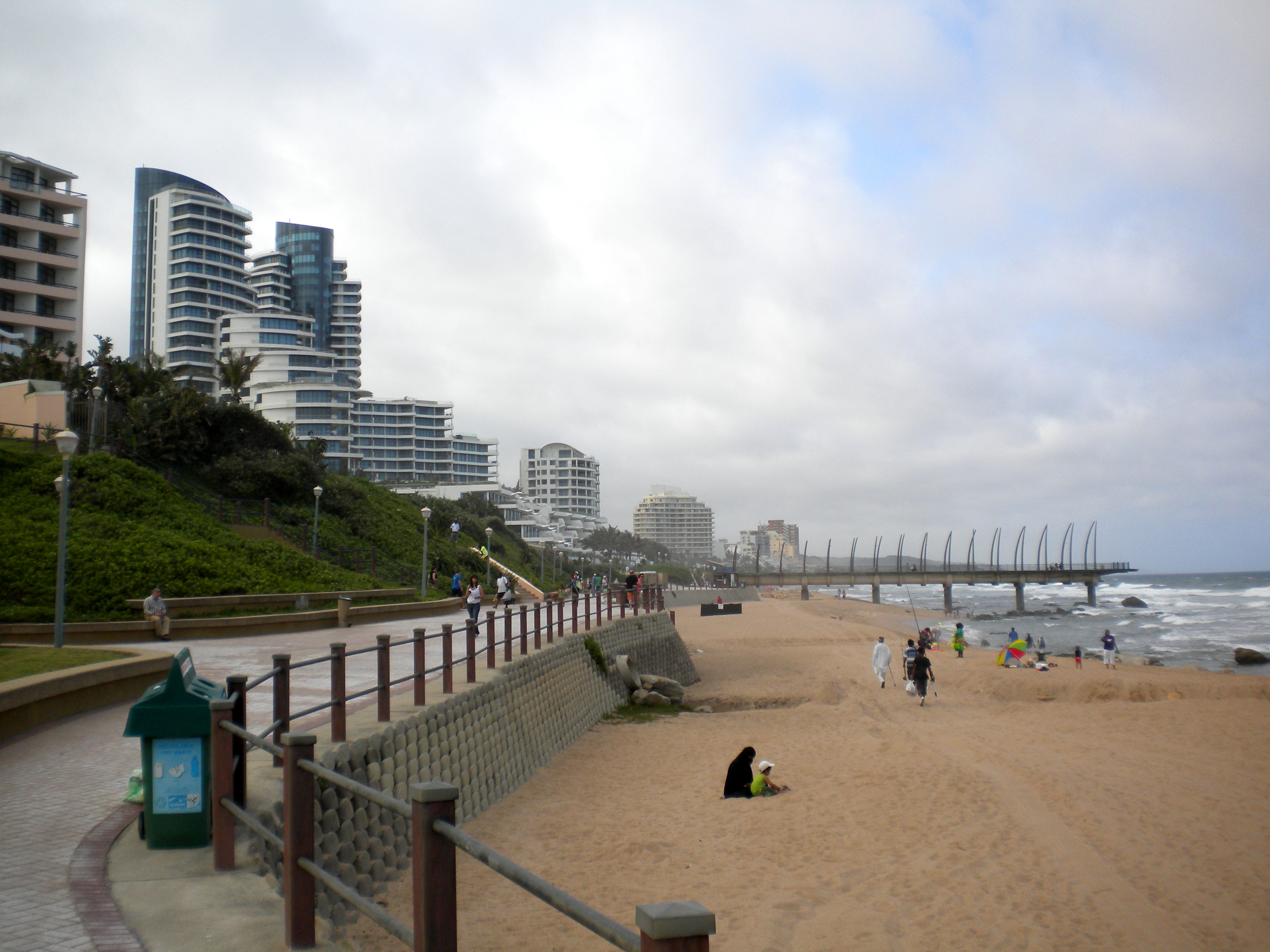
- View of the skyline and beach of uMhlanga Rocks in 2011

- Location within KwaZulu-Natal Location within South Africa
- Coordinates: 29°44′00″S 31°04′15″E
- Country: South Africa
- Province: KwaZulu-Natal
- Municipality: eThekwini

Government
  - Councillor: Bradley Singh (DA)

Area
  - Total: 16.75 km^{2} (6.47 sq mi)

Population (2011)
  - Total: 24,238
  - Density: 1,447/km^{2} (3,748/sq mi)

Racial makeup (2011)
  - Black African: 17.1%
  - Coloured: 2.1%
  - Indian/Asian: 29.2%
  - White: 53.3%
  - Other: 1.2%

First languages (2011)
  - English: 78.9%
  - Zulu: 9.0%
  - Afrikaans: 6.1%
  - Xhosa: 1.1%
  - Other: 4.9%
- Time zone: UTC+2 (SAST)
- Postal code (street): 4319
- PO box: 4320

uMhlanga, alternatively rendered Umhlanga, is a residential, commercial and resort town north of Durban on the coast of KwaZulu-Natal, South Africa. It is part of the eThekwini Metropolitan Municipality, which was created in 2000 and includes the greater Durban area. The name means "place of reeds" in the Zulu language, and the correct pronunciation of "hl" in uMhlanga is similar to the Welsh "ll".

uMhlanga is well known for the Gateway Theatre of Shopping, the largest shopping mall in the Southern Hemisphere. It also has the tallest skyscraper in South Africa outside Johannesburg, Pearl Dawn, at 152 m. uMhlanga is one of the fastest-growing towns in South Africa; its population increased 57.5% from 15,387 in the 2001 census to 24,238 in the 2011 census.

== History ==
uMhlanga derives its name from the Zulu language and means "place of reeds", referring to the beds of reeds growing along the Ohlanga River north of uMhlanga Rocks.

The Oyster Box, a luxury hotel since the 1950s, was built as a beach cottage in 1869, before the town had even been founded.

In 1895, Sir Marshall Campbell founded uMhlanga. The town's first hotel was established in 1920, followed by a shop, a lighthouse, the Natal Anti Shark Measures Board (today called the KwaZulu-Natal Sharks Board) and further hotel developments.

The Borough of uMhlanga was formed on 1 August 1972 through the amalgamation of uMhlanga Rocks, a seaside resort town, and the suburb of La Lucia. Mr Rodney Rindel, former chairman of the La Lucia town board, was elected to mayor of the newly formed Borough of uMhlanga. Mr Rindel said that the people of La Lucia had made no secret that they were opposed to the amalgamation and were not happy with the name, but now that this had come about they would make the best of it.

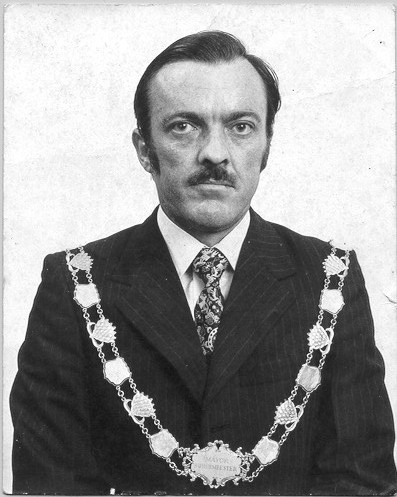
Rodney Rindel - Mayor of uMhlanga 1972

In the 1980s, development expanded inland growing from a small village east of the M4 highway to a large town occupying most of the area east of N2 highway and south of the Hawaan Forest.

The construction of the Gateway Theatre of Shopping by Old Mutual Properties (opened in 2001) marked a significant change for the uMhlanga area, creating rapid commercialisation and urban sprawl in the area and had a crucial role in the development of the then small town of Umhlanga, lying just outside Durban.

The Greater Durban metropolitan area is seeing expansion into areas near the Hawaan forest to the north which is the natural habitat of many creatures such as the vervet monkey. The monkeys often venture into the greater city in search of food from residents and unsuspecting tourists.

=== Spelling change ===
In November 2009, the eThekwini Metropolitan Municipality submitted a list of places in the municipality to the KwaZulu-Natal Provincial Geographic Names Committee to be changed from their anglicised names to the correct Zulu spelling. In the list, the town "Umhlanga Rocks" was to be changed to "uMhlanga Rocks" which meant the '"u" in the spelling would change from an uppercase to a lowercase. On 1 October 2010, the KwaZulu-Natal Department of Arts and Culture gazetted the list of approved name changes which included the town of Umhlanga Rocks.

Ever since the name change, the South African National Roads Agency Ltd. (SANRAL) has changed the road signs on the N2 leading to and at the Mount Edgecombe Interchange as well as some road signs on the M41 however there are still several road signs that still remain with the spelling "Umhlanga" and many Durbanites and residents and businesses still spell the town with its previous spelling.

== Law and government ==
In 1994, after the local government elections, The Borough of uMhlanga, which also included Glen Anil (now part of Durban North) and Umdloti Beach (renamed to eMdloti) was amalgamated with some surrounding areas, including Mount Edgecombe, Verulam and Tongaat (now oThongathi) to form the North Local Council, as part of the short-lived transitional Durban Metropolitan Council which included the former City of Durban Municipality and former surrounding independent municipalities. This arrangement ended in 2000, and today uMhlanga is part of the eThekwini Metropolitan Municipality and its Northern Municipal Planning Region (MRP).

== Geography ==
uMhlanga is situated on the northern urban outskirts of the Greater Durban metropolitan area and is often considered a suburb of Durban, just 16 km (10 mi) from the city centre. It shares borders with Durban North to the south and Mount Edgecombe to the west. Situated along the Indian Ocean coastline, uMhlanga lies on a prominent ridge overlooking the ocean, gently sloping from uMhlanga Rocks along the coastline towards uMhlanga Ridge at the crest of the ridge.

=== Suburbs ===
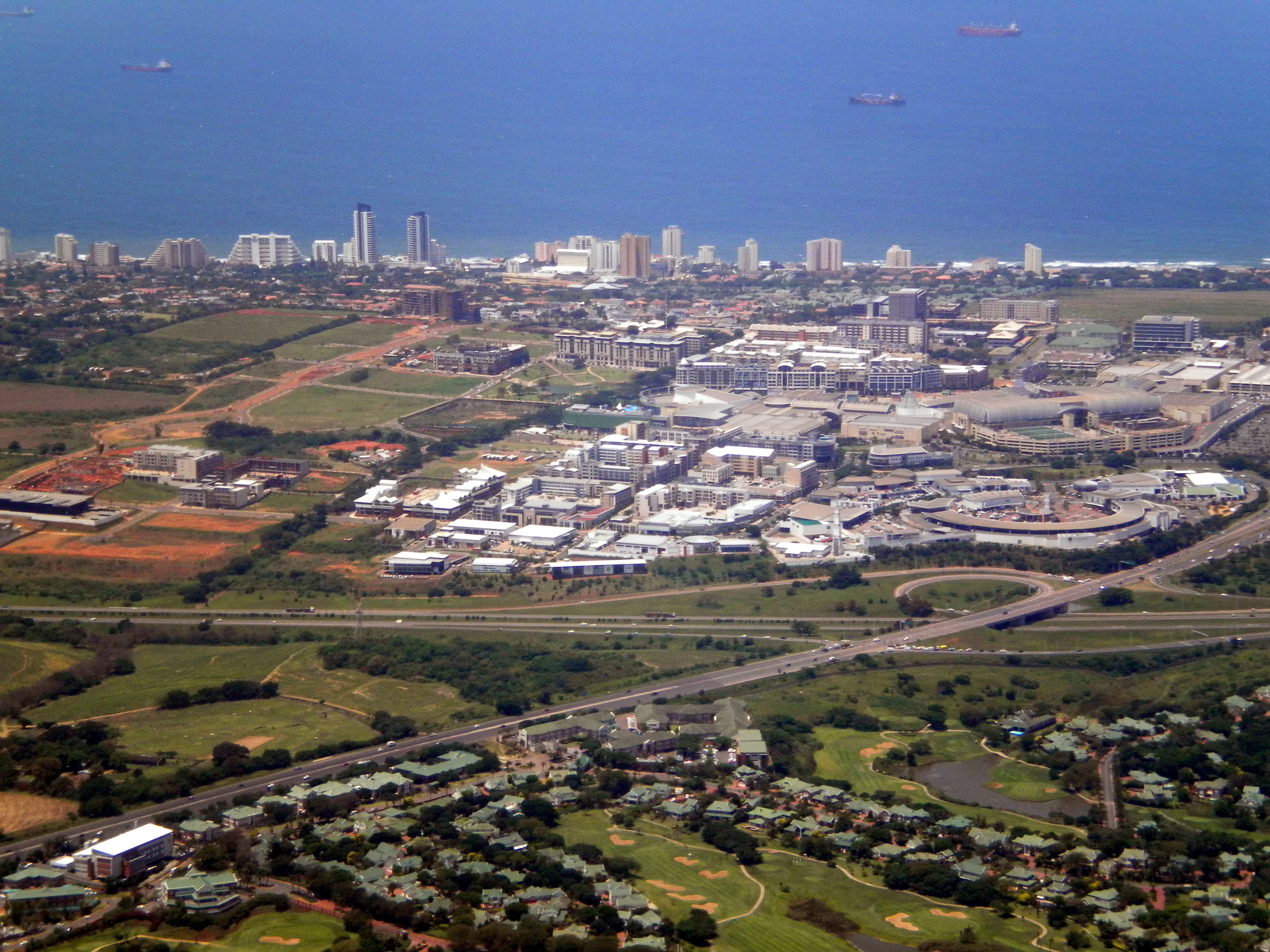
Aerial view of uMhlanga Ridge (foreground) and uMhlanga Rocks (on ocean beyond)

Along the coastline lies the suburb of uMhlanga Rocks, which contains the traditional commercial centre of uMhlanga. The ridge, which borders Mount Edgecombe to the west includes the suburbs of uMhlanga Ridge, Prestondale, Izinga Estate, Sunningdale and Somerset Park. The slope between the ridge and the coastline include the suburbs of La Lucia, Ridgeside and Herrwood Park.

==== La Lucia ====
A formerly independent suburb, La Lucia is located on the southern boundary of uMhlanga with Durban North and is located on the hillside overlooking the Indian Ocean. La Lucia is one of the most upmarket suburbs of Greater Durban. In 2017, according to property agency, Private Property, La Lucia was ranked as the 2nd most expensive suburb in Greater Durban after the neighbouring Mt Edgecombe Country Club Estate.

==== Ridgeside ====
Formerly sugarcane fields, Ridgeside is a new office node situated on the hillside overlooking the Indian Ocean. The area combines office estate, commercial, mixed-use, residential, leisure developments and managed open spaces. The node is home to business' regional offices in KwaZulu-Natal such as Investec, eNCA, Vodacom.

==== Somerset Park ====
Somerset Park is a residential suburb on the ridge above La Lucia and its residences are notably uniform with their design with similar green colonial-designed roofs to the adjacent Mt Edgecombe Country Club Estate.

==== uMhlanga Ridge ====
uMhlanga Ridge is a new retail, office and residential node situated on the ridge overlooking the Indian Ocean, making up the most recent expansion in uMhlanga. It was largely developed on sugarcane land by property development company, Moreland Estates, owned by the Tongaat Hulett sugar group. Located on the ridge are Gateway Theatre of Shopping and other shopping centres, motor dealerships, two private hospitals and many offices.

uMhlanga Ridge Town Centre is connected by a series of pedestrian-friendly roads, parks and public spaces. The Town Centre is easily accessed by a network of major roads, including the N2.

The new uMhlanga Ridge Town Centre has been under construction for almost a decade. Vela VKE consulted on the structural input for the design of the grade separation bridge and two parking court structures. Civil infrastructure costs amount to R200 million to date.

==== uMhlanga Rocks ====
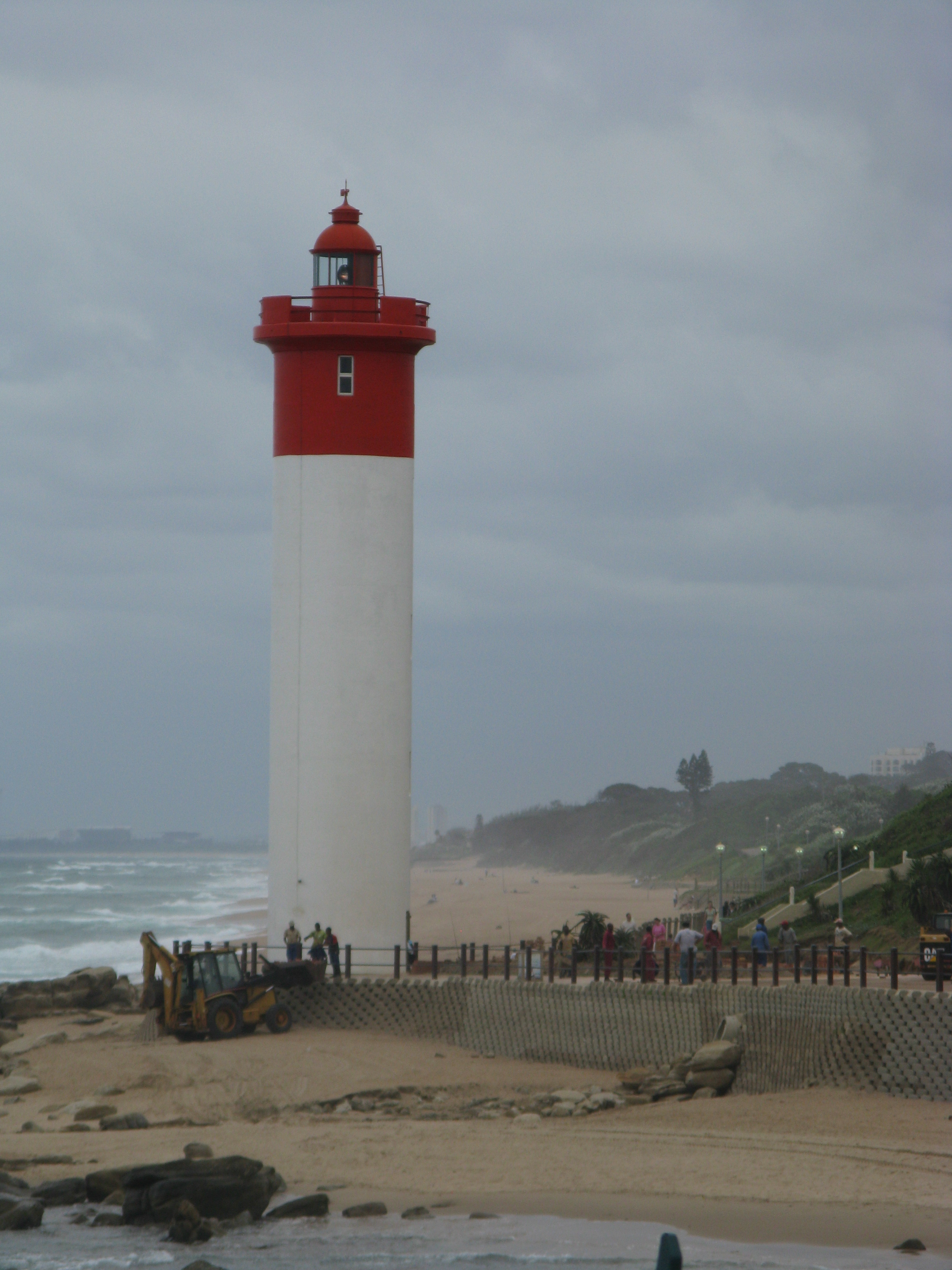
Lighthouse at uMhlanga Rocks

uMhlanga Rocks, also commonly known as uMhlanga Village, is the coastal strip east of the M4 and is the most established area of uMhlanga, established prior to the sprawling development of the suburbs on the ridge above. The “village” has many luxury hotels and apartments right on the beach, including the Cabana Beach Hotel, the Beverly Hills Hotel, The Oyster Box Hotel, the uMhlanga Sands Hotel and Pearls of uMhlanga apartments. Many of these have views of the uMhlanga Rocks Lighthouse. It has a large increase in population during the summer months.

== Economy ==
=== Economic development ===
uMhlanga, specifically the former sugarcane fields of uMhlanga Ridge, has become the focus of development in the Greater Durban metropolitan area developing into one of metro's economic hubs due to many businesses relocating offices from Durban CBD (similarly to Sandton forming the new centre of Johannesburg), a move that has been criticized for "fragmenting the urban fabric" and furthering "the new apartheid" in Greater Durban. The opening of the King Shaka International Airport in La Mercy, near uMhlanga in 2010, replacing the Durban International Airport, south of Durban was one of the main factors that triggered the fast growing development in uMhlanga.

Due to the economic boom in the uMhlanga area as well as the new airport located nearby, various developments are under way which will substantially increase the population over the next two decades. In just over twenty years, uMhlanga has grown from a small beachside holiday destination on the North Coast to Greater Durban's premier business, retail and tourism hub.

About 6 kilometres (3.7 mi) up the coast will be the luxury Aerotropolis known as the Sibaya Coastal City inland to eMdloti It is estimated that it will cost R25-50 billion to develop. It will include around 9000 houses as well as numerous social and public facilities.

The new uMhlanga Ridge Town Centre has seen major expansion with many apartment complexes and businesses being built. The estimated R25 billion Cornubia development is being built across the N2 from the new town centre and will include 24000 low and middle income houses. In late 2017 the R1.8 billion Cornubia Mall opened to the public.

In the uMhlanga Village, the final phase of the Pearls of Umhlanga, Pearl Sky was completed in 2017 which includes a shopping mall. Adjacent and inland of the Pearls of Umhlanga on Lagoon Drive, the Oceans uMhlanga development has already seen the opening of its 5-star Radisson Blu Hotel tower in June 2022 and its new luxury shopping centre, Oceans Mall in November 2022. At a price of R3.1 billion The Oceans uMhlanga development is the largest private sector investment in South African history narrowly beating the Pearls of Umhlanga at R3 billion.

=== Major companies ===
As the most prominent commercial node in the Greater Durban metropole, uMhlanga hosts the head offices of numerous major national and international corporations, including:

- Aspen Pharmacare
- Bidvest Insurance
- Combined Motor Holdings
- Hollywoodbets
- Illovo Sugar
- KZN Shark Board
- SA Home Loans
- The Spar Group Ltd
- Unilever South Africa
- Beiersdorf Consumer Products South Africa
- BET Software
- Consumer Relief
- Ignition Group
- National Independent Medical Aid Society

=== Retail ===
uMhlanga is known for the Gateway Theatre of Shopping, the largest mall in KwaZulu-Natal and the third largest in South Africa. The development of Gateway and other shopping centres such as Oceans Mall, Pearls Mall, Umhlanga Centre, The Crescent, and La Lucia Mall has transformed uMhlanga into a significant retail and entertainment node in the Greater Durban region.

=== Tourism ===
uMhlanga is part of the uMhlanga Coast, also known as the FunShine Coast, which includes Durban North, Mount Edgecombe, Verulam, oThongathi, eMdloti, La Mercy, and Westbrook. This region aligns with the boundaries of the Northern MRP within the eThekwini Municipality. uMhlanga Rocks Tourism serves as the official tourism board, promoting and marketing this vibrant stretch of coastline.

While uMhlanga has evolved into a major commercial node, it remains traditionally a resort town and continues to be one of South Africa's most popular tourist destinations. There were 1.2 million visitors in 2015 which generated a GDP of R20-billion. In 2016, the tourism chairman Peter Rose said “I can confidently say that within the next five years you will not recognise uMhlanga,” Residents of uMhlanga have mixed feelings about the changes such as that it is losing its village appeal while they appreciate the new infrastructure and increased property values.

==== Tourist attractions ====
The uMhlanga Rocks Promenade, officially named the Ken O'Connor Promenade after a former mayor, is a scenic beach walkway that extends along the coastline of uMhlanga Rocks. The promenade stretches north to south from the northern viewing deck near the uMhlanga Lagoon Nature Reserve to the Durban View Parks and includes key tourist attractions such as the uMhlanga Rocks Lighthouse and the Whalebone Pier.

uMhlanga Rocks also features two lifeguard-patrolled beaches: Bronze Beach to the north and uMhlanga Main Beach in the central area.

Additional attractions in uMhlanga and its surrounding areas include:

- WavePark: an aquatic park in Gateway
- Chris Saunders Park: park in the centre of uMhlanga Ridge with a small lake
- Durban View Park: a park at the southern end of the promenade, named after its view of Durban across the Natal Bay
- Mt Edgecombe Country Club: two championship golf courses situated west of uMhlanga
- Sibaya Casino and Entertainment Kingdom: an entertainment precinct situated north-east of uMhlanga
- uMhlanga Lagoon Nature Reserve and Hawaan Forest: an indigenous subtropical woodland located north of uMhlanga, along the southern banks of the Ohlanga River.

== Infrastructure ==
=== Healthcare ===
==== Private Hospitals ====
- Busamed Gateway Private Hospital
- La Lucia Healthcare Hospital
- Netcare uMhlanga Hospital

=== Transport ===
==== Roads ====
The N2 and M4 serve as key north–south freeways. The N2, to the west, links uMhlanga with Durban, King Shaka International Airport, and KwaDukuza while the M4, following the coastal route, connects uMhlanga with Durban and Ballito. The M41 provides a major east–west connection between uMhlanga, Mount Edgecombe, and Phoenix.

The M12, known as uMhlanga Rocks Drive, is the main arterial road through uMhlanga, extending southward toward Durban North. Additionally, the M47, called uMhlanga Ridge Boulevard, offers a direct connection between uMhlanga and Cornubia to the west.

==== Vehicle registration ====
Until December 2023, the greater uMhlanga area (including eMdloti and Mount Edgecombe) maintained a distinct vehicular identity through its "NUR” registration plate prefix, representing Natal uMhlanga Rocks.

== Crime ==
uMhlanga is one of the safest areas in the Greater Durban area. The Durban North precinct which includes a small slice along the coast of Durban North, all of uMhlanga and eMdloti maintained a murder rate of around 7 per 100,000 from 2016 to 2019, about 1/5 of the national average of 35.9 in 2017. Between March 2018 and March 2019, police recorded 3 murders, 136 robberies and 318 residential burglaries. The number of residential burglaries halved between 2014 and 2019 possibly linked to the proliferation of highly visible private security in the area. Certain areas in uMhlanga are very safe, one being Somerset Park, a short distance from the Gateway Theatre of Shopping.

== Demographics ==
During apartheid, uMhlanga was a predominately white town, however now it is very diverse with people from various racial backgrounds and ethnic groups. 78.9% speak English as their first language, 9.0% Zulu and 6.12% Afrikaans. There is also a sizable Portuguese population.

The number of people from each racial group increased between 2001 and 2011. The number of white people increased from 11,523 to 12,925 while the percentage dropped from 74.9% to 53.3%. The number of black people increased from 1,770 to 4,147. The number of "Indians or Asians" increased from 1,953 to 6,353. The number of coloureds increased from 141 to 297.

As of the 2011 census, the most black area is the new town centre area which is 24.1% black. The most white area is the northern coastal area of Greater Durban including the uMhlanga Village which is 66.9% white. The most Indian area is the woodlands which is 46.0% Indian. The expensive new developments tend to have higher Indian populations than the average for uMhlanga while the lower cost developments tend to have higher Indian and black populations than the average. The older parts of uMhlanga (such as uMhlanga Village) tend to have higher white populations than the average.

== Sewage crisis ==
In 2022, the eThekwini Metro faced a massive sewage problem due to failures in its water treatment plants which were further exacerbated by the April floods which destroyed several sewage infrastructures.

uMhlanga was one of the worst affected areas in the metropolis, with its beaches closed for a long period of time due to the high E. coli levels found in the ocean water. This had serious repercussions on Umhlanga Rocks' tourism economy.

The sewage crisis had been caused due to a pump station along the Ohlanga River that had been overflowing for several months, however on 23 November 2022, the eThekwini Metropolitan Municipality confirmed that the pump station was repaired in time for the festive season, which brings in a lot of income for uMhlanga's economy.

== See also ==
- uMhlanga Lagoon Nature Reserve
