= Mount Edgecombe Interchange =

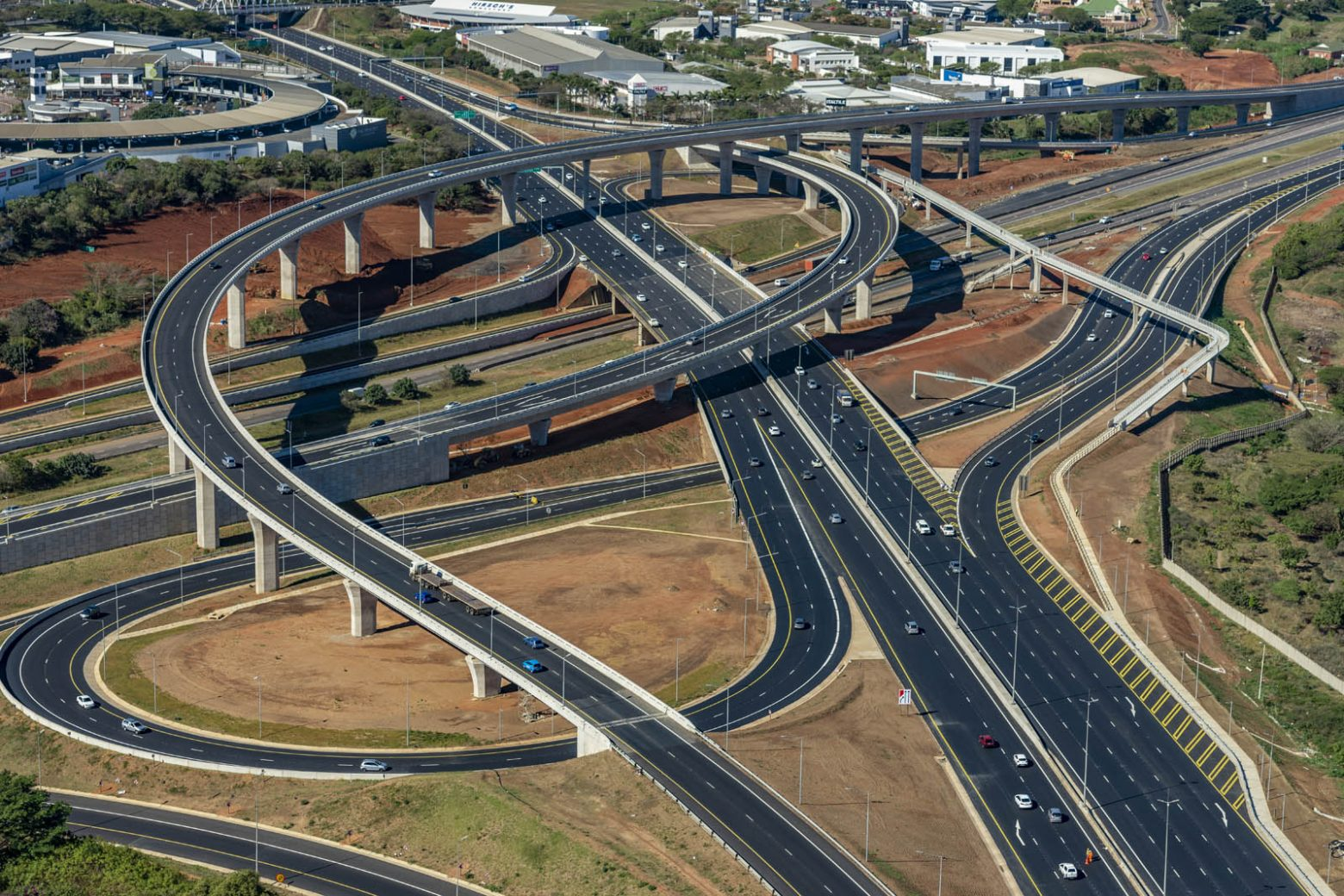

Location
- Mount Edgecombe/uMhlanga, South Africa
- Coordinates: 29°43′24.33″S 31°3′29.04″E
- Roads at junction: N2; M41

Construction
- Type: Four-level Interchange
- Spans: 2
- Lanes: 2-3
- Constructed: by CMC di Ravenna (renovation)
- Maintained by: South African National Roads Agency

The Mount Edgecombe Interchange, is a major freeway interchange located between Mount Edgecombe and uMhlanga in KwaZulu-Natal, South Africa. It is the junction between the N2 and M41 freeways and underwent a major upgrade to relieve the increasing traffic congestion in the area.

== Roads ==
The N2 is a national route running north–south from the King Shaka International Airport and KwaDukuza towards Durban and Port Shepstone. The M41 is a metropolitan route running east–west from the M4 in uMhlanga towards the R102 between Mount Edgecombe and Phoenix.

== Design ==
A key feature of the project is its two incrementally launched bridges: one, spanning 948 meters, connects the Mount Edgecombe side of the M41 to the N2 South and stands as the longest incrementally launched bridge in South Africa; the second, 440 meters long, links the uMhlanga side of the M41 to the N2 North.

== Upgrade ==
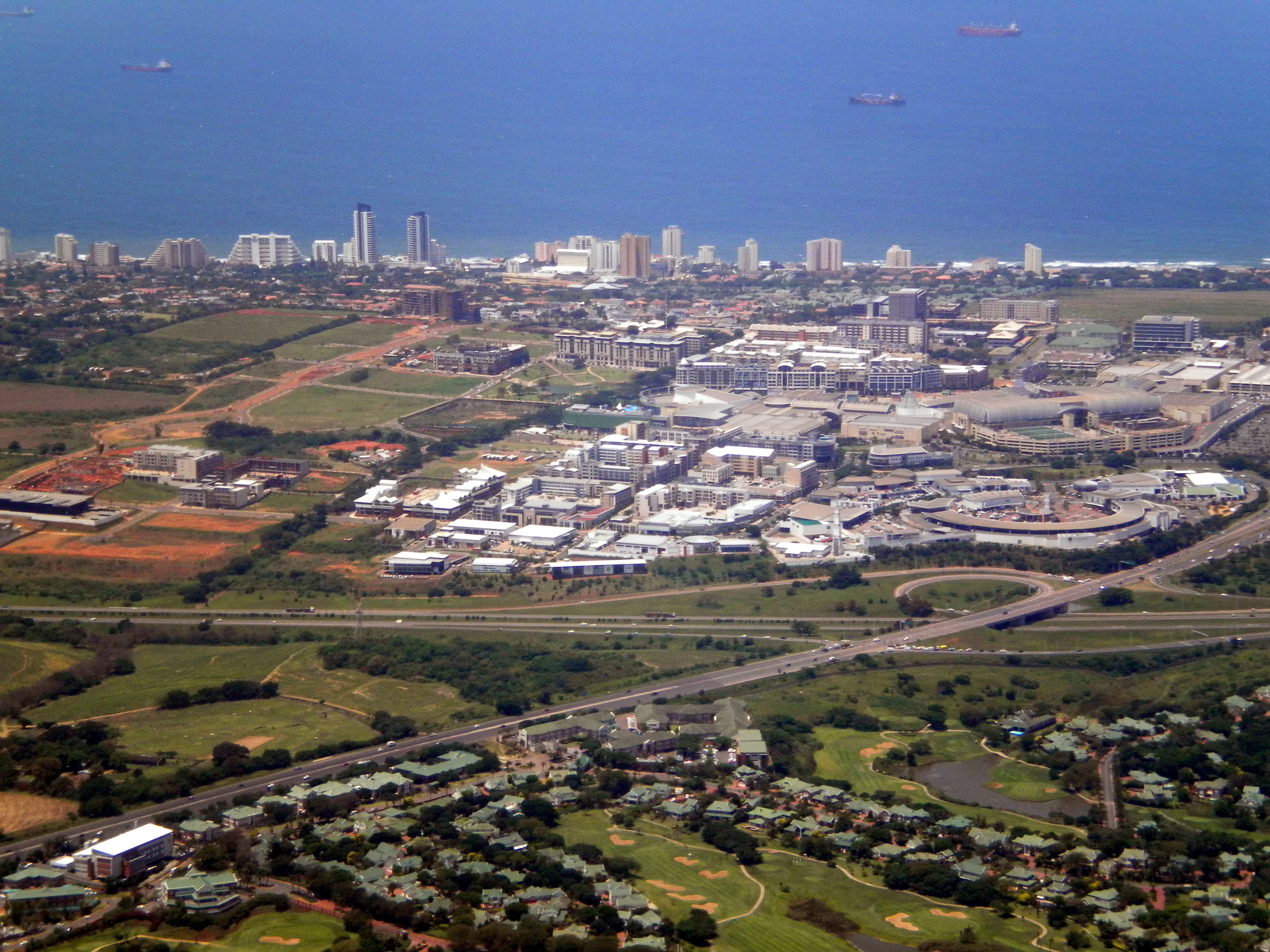
Aerial view of the old diamond interchange of the Mount Edgecombe Interchange

Prior to the upgrade of the Mount Edgecombe Interchange, the interchange was a diamond interchange with traffic lights, and included a loop ramp connecting the M41 eastbound carriageway with the N2 South. The growth of the uMhlanga Ridge and La Lucia Ridge areas had pushed the existing diamond interchange to its capacity, resulting in traffic backing up on the M41 and spilling onto the N2 during peak hours. With around 40,000 additional vehicles joining or exiting the N2 from the M41 each day, significant queuing occurred throughout the day. Anticipated future development in Cornubia (north of Mount Edgecombe and west of uMhlanga) further emphasised the need to upgrade the interchange to enhance traffic flow between the N2, M41, and surrounding roads.

To address the congestion issue at the interchange, the upgrade of the Mount Edgecombe Interchange began in April 2013 and involved converting the existing diamond interchange into a free-flow, four-level interchange.

The project was funded through a collaboration between SANRAL and the KwaZulu-Natal Department of Transport, with construction carried out by the South African branch of the Italian company CMC di Ravenna. On 30 October 2018, the upgraded interchange was officially opened by then Minister of Transport, Blade Nzimande.

With the conversion of the interchange to a completely free-flowing system with limited stops, it is expected that travel time between the areas the interchange connects will now be significantly reduced from 25 minutes to one minute on average.
