= FlySafair =

Low-cost airline of South Africa

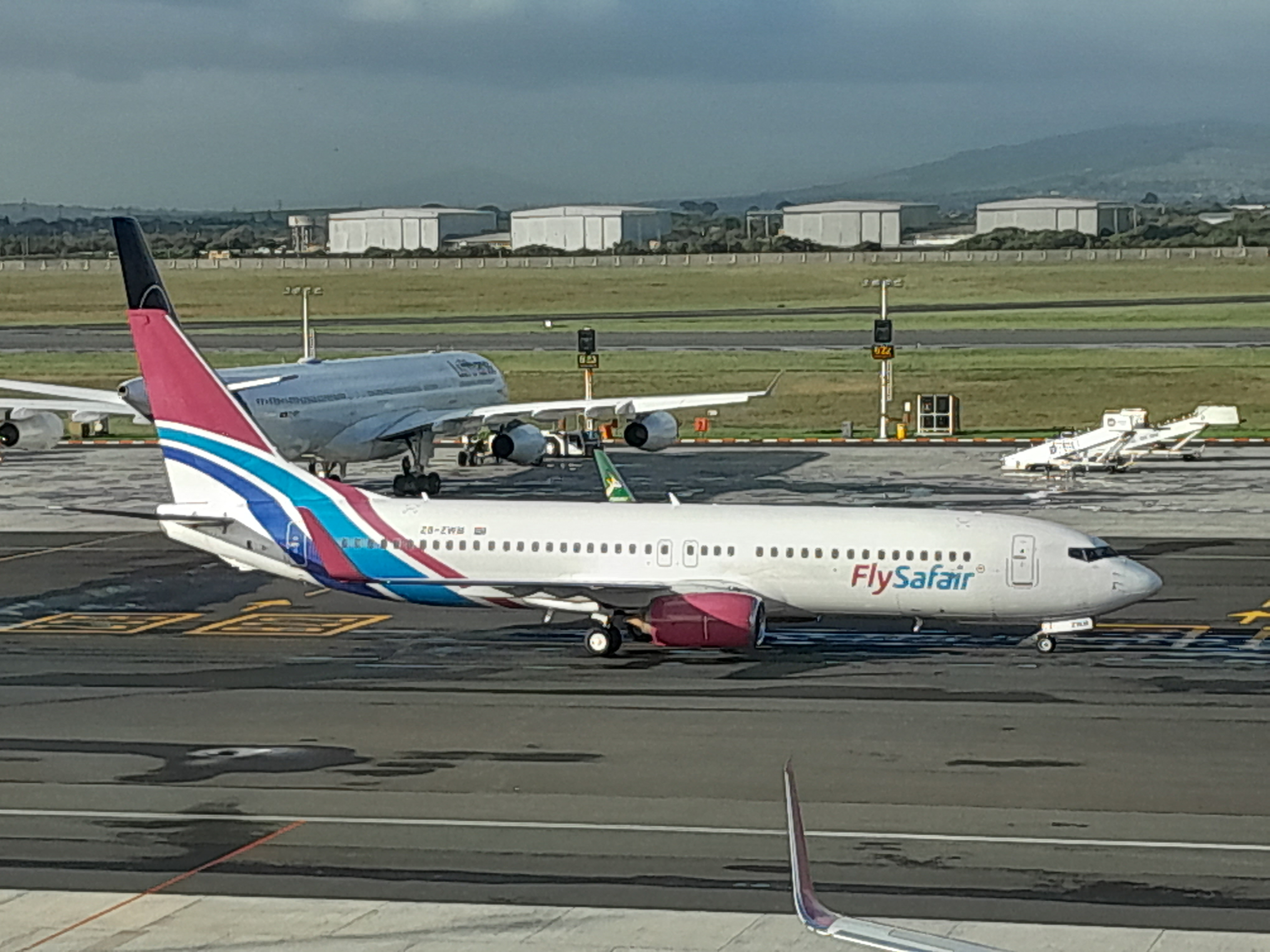
- A FlySafair Boeing 737-800 featuring the airline's newest livery
IATA	ICAO	Call sign
FA	SFR	SAFAIR
- Founded: August 2013; 13 years ago
- Commenced operations: 16 October 2014; 12 years ago
- Operating bases: Cape Town; Durban; Johannesburg-O. R. Tambo; Johannesburg-Lanseria
- Fleet size: 36 (2026)
- Destinations: 15 (2026)
- Parent company: Safair Operations
- Headquarters: Kempton Park, Gauteng, South Africa
- Key people: Elmar Conradie (CEO)
- Employees: ▲1,700 (2025)
- Website: flysafair.co.za

FlySafair (pronounced: "fly-saf-air") is a South African international low-cost airline, founded in 2013 and headquartered in Johannesburg. As of 2026, FlySafair services 15 destinations in Sub-Saharan Africa, operating a fleet of 36 aircraft.

The company is regarded as South Africa's first true low-cost carrier, and has been credited with reducing prices on certain domestic routes, as well as having the best on-time performance of any major South African airline.

FlySafair is owned by Safair Operations, whose shareholders include the Safair Investment Trust, B4I Safair, and Safair Holdings.

== History ==
The airline was established in August 2013 and was granted approval by the South African Air Service Licensing Council to launch operations with ten daily services between Johannesburg's O. R. Tambo International Airport and Cape Town International Airport.

The airline had plans to begin operations in October 2013. However, on 8 October 2013, the High Court of South Africa granted an interim court order preventing the airline from starting operations, following an application by rival carriers, on the basis that it did not meet the legal requirement of 75% local ownership.

Substantial restructuring of ownership took place and FlySafair's inaugural flight eventually took place on 16 October 2014.

In 2017, the airline announced a partnership with the South African Rugby Union (SARU), making it the official domestic carrier for the Springboks and SA Rugby. The deal was extended for four years in February 2020.

In September 2022, the airline went through a rebrand with redesigns to their logo and new livery. The International Air Services Council (IASC) of South Africa also approved 11 new international routes.

In May 2024, it was announced that South Africa's International Air Service Council (IASC) would assess complaints about FlySafair's ownership structure. Competing airlines Airlink and LIFT (via owner Global Airways) petitioned the Council to assess FlySafair's ownership, alleging that the airline had breached South Africa's foreign ownership rules.

The competitors alleged that FlySafair was predominantly owned by foreign investors and shareholders, in contravention of both the Air Services Licensing Act, which governs SA's domestic carriers, and the International Air Services Licensing Act, which governs SA's international carriers. The former requires a 75% local shareholding, while the latter requires a "substantial local shareholding", which the industry has taken to mean at least 51%. FlySafair's competitors said the airline's voting rights were not held by individuals in South Africa.

In November 2024, the International Air Service Council (IASC) found that FlySafair was 74.86% owned by Ireland-based ASL Aviation Holdings, via an investment holding company. The airline was therefore found to be in contravention of South Africa's Air Services Licensing Act. This raised the possibility of the South African government suspending FlySafair's operating license. For its part, FlySafair challenged its understanding of the law, and said it remained committed to compliance. In October 2025 the South African High Court granted FlySafair an urgent interdict that effectively removed the January 2026 deadline.

In November 2024, the airline announced that it had become the official domestic carrier of the Proteas.

=== 2025 strike and flight disruptions ===
In July 2025, more than 200 FlySafair pilots, representing almost two-thirds of the airline’s cockpit crew, embarked on industrial action through the Solidarity trade union after rejecting a wage offer. The pilots requested a base salary increase of 10.5% for 2025/26, followed by annual increases of CPI plus 4.5% and CPI plus 4% in subsequent years. They also raised concerns about changes to rosters that they said negatively impacted leave allocation and work-life balance.

FlySafair countered with a 5.7% increase to base pay, along with performance-based bonuses, which brought the overall cost-to-company increase to approximately 11.3%. The airline stated that this offer was both competitive and sustainable, given the broader economic environment.

The strike began on 21 July 2025, resulting in the cancellation of about 12 to 13% of scheduled flights. This included 26 cancelled services on 21 July, and two more on 22 July, affecting operations out of the airline’s main bases. FlySafair notified affected passengers, offered refunds, and implemented contingency plans to minimise disruption.

The airline noted that its pilots were among the top earners in the industry, with captains earning between R1.8 million and R2.3 million per year. Average flying hours stood at 63 per month, which FlySafair emphasised remained within regulatory limits.

Following the announcement of a one-day strike, FlySafair responded with a seven-day lockout of the affected pilots. Solidarity then extended the strike declaration to 14 days. Talks between the airline and union were mediated by the Commission for Conciliation, Mediation and Arbitration.

FlySafair defended its wage offer as being in line with market conditions, arguing that it struck a fair balance between pilot expectations, affordability for passengers, and the long-term financial health of the organisation.

=== Recent developments ===
In February 2026, South African private equity firm Harith General Partners agreed terms to purchase FlySafair, subject to regulatory approval. Harith Chairman Tshepo Mahloele said at the time that the deal would comprise around 15% of the equity firm's overall portfolio. Also at the time of the announcement, it was reported that FlySafair constituted over 60% of South African domestic airline seat capacity.

In July 2026, the South African Competition Commission recommended that the Competition Tribunal approve the acquisition of FlySafair by Harith General Partners, with conditions. The deal would help the airline meet South African ownership rules. However, in August rival airline CemAir asked South Africa's Competition Tribunal to prohibit Harith's purchase, arguing that the state pension fund sits on both sides of the transaction and would leave competitors unable to match the terms available to the merged group.

In October 2026, the Competition Tribunal gave its approval of the 100% FlySafair acquisition by Sandton-based Harith Aviation, clearing the way for final regulatory approvals before the deal would be finalized. It was expected to close before the end of 2026. Harith said at the time that the deal kept FlySafair ownership in SA. Harith also confirmed that the airline would continue to operate independently under its existing management team, and retain its low-cost operating model.

== Destinations ==
FlySafair serves the following 15 destinations:

Country	City	Airport	Notes
Mauritius	Port Louis	Sir Seewoosagur Ramgoolam International Airport	
Namibia	Windhoek	Hosea Kutako International Airport	
South Africa	Bloemfontein	Bram Fischer International Airport	
South Africa	Cape Town	Cape Town International Airport	Hub
South Africa	Durban	King Shaka International Airport	Hub
South Africa	East London	King Phalo Airport	
South Africa	George	George Airport	
South Africa	Gqeberha	Chief Dawid Stuurman International Airport	
South Africa	Hoedspruit	Air Force Base Hoedspruit	
South Africa	Mbombela	Kruger Mpumalanga International Airport	
South Africa	Johannesburg	O. R. Tambo International Airport	Hub
South Africa	Johannesburg	Lanseria International Airport	Hub
Tanzania	Zanzibar	Abeid Amani Karume International Airport	
Zimbabwe	Harare	Robert Gabriel Mugabe International Airport	
Zimbabwe	Victoria Falls	Victoria Falls Airport	

=== Interline agreements ===
FlySafair interlines with the following airlines:

- Air France
- Emirates
- Qatar Airways
- Ethiopian Airlines
- KLM
- Kenya Airways
- Norse Atlantic Airways
- Proflight Zambia

== Fleet ==
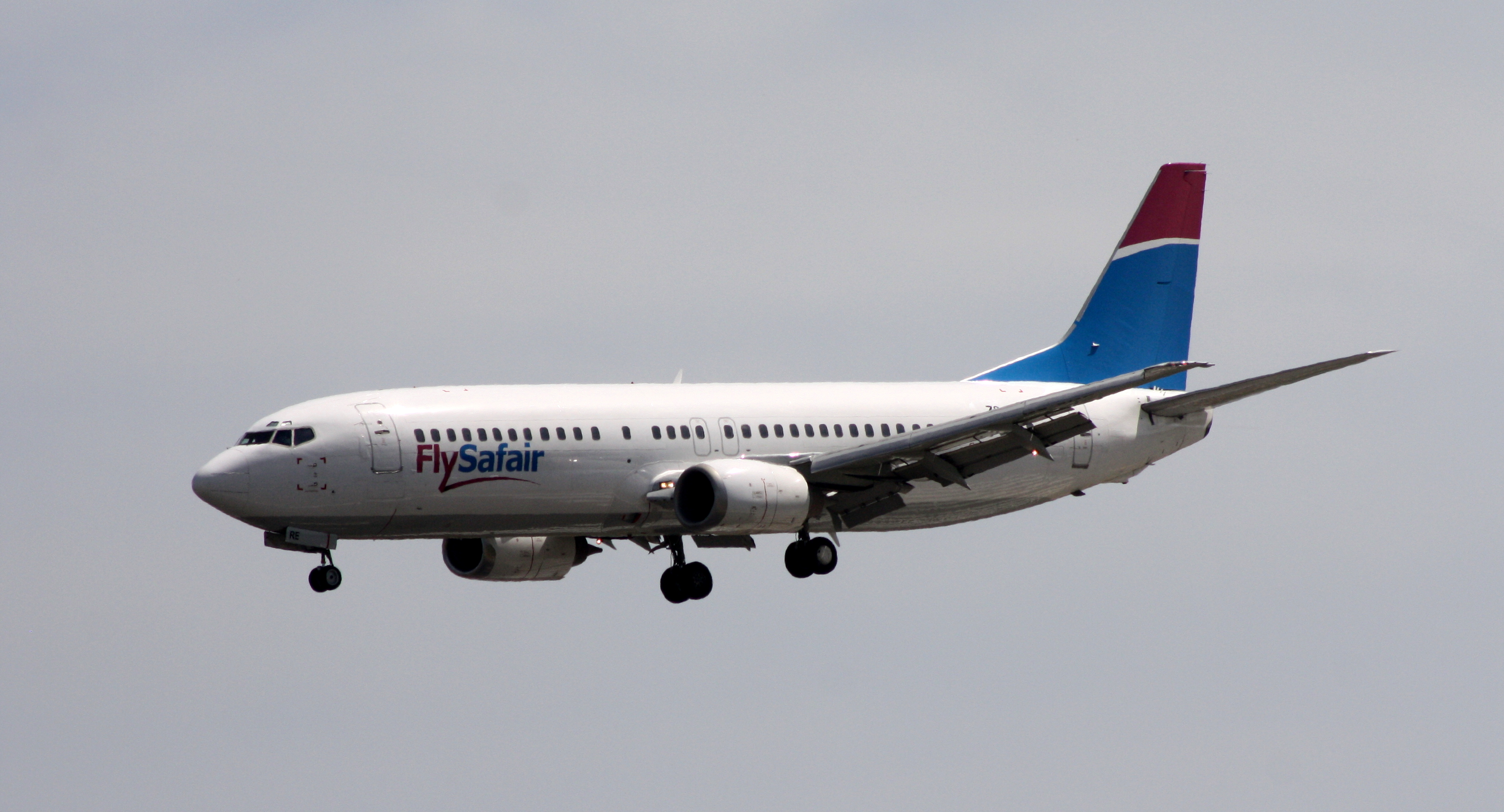
FlySafair Boeing 737-400 in the airline's 2013 livery

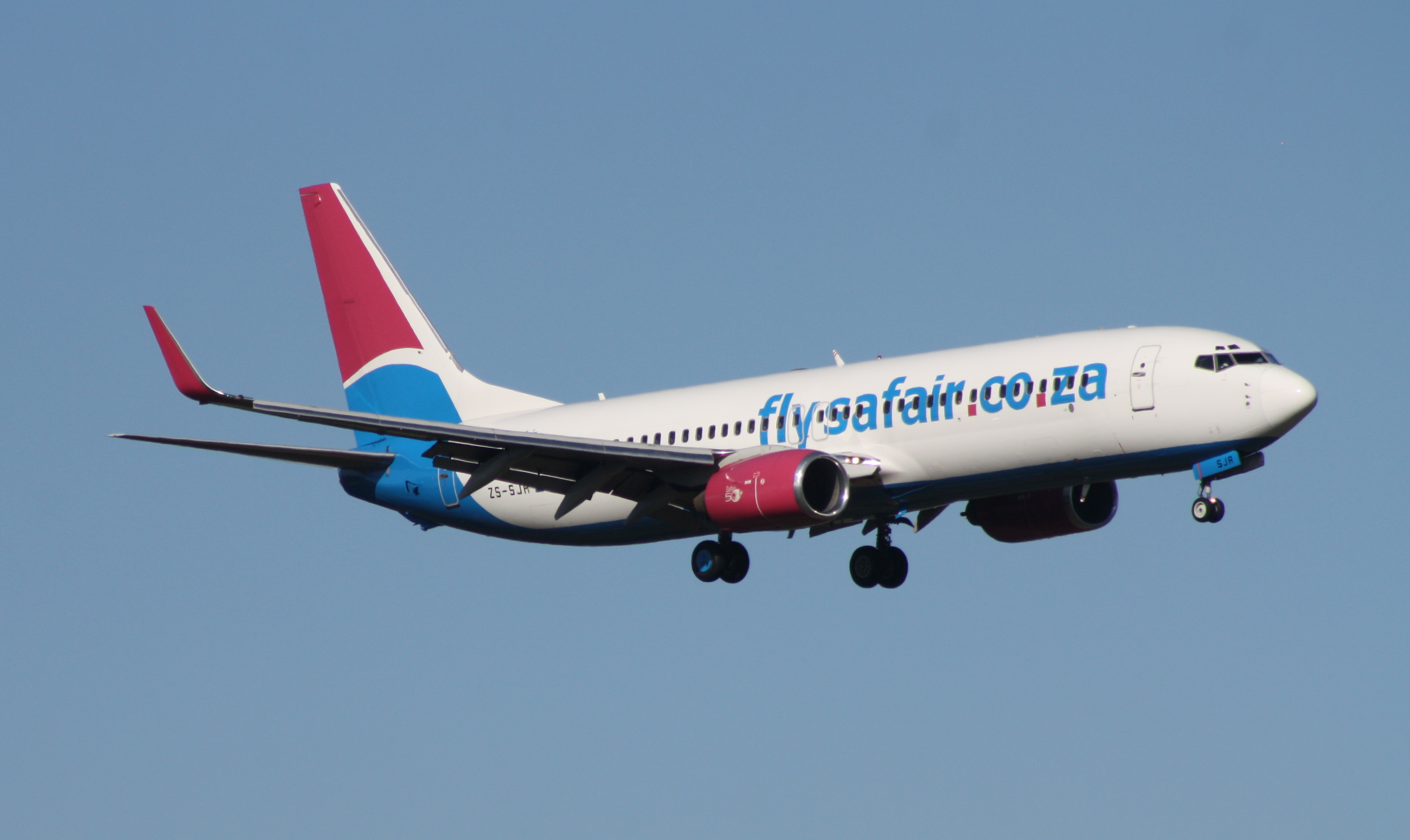
FlySafair Boeing 737-800 in the airline's 2015 livery

As of August 2025, FlySafair operates the following aircraft:

Aircraft	Active	Orders	Passengers	Notes
Aircraft	Active	Orders	Y	Notes
Boeing 737-800	36	1	189	
Total	36	1		

== Services ==
=== In-flight service ===
FlySafair offers food and drinks as a buy-on-board programme, partnering up with Tourvest. FlySafair also offers a monthly magazine on board named In Flight. It was also the first airline in South Africa to offer card payments aboard their flights.

On their international routes they offer a pre-packed meal at no charge, with other food and drink options for sale. For hygienic reasons, the In Flight magazine is currently only in digital format.

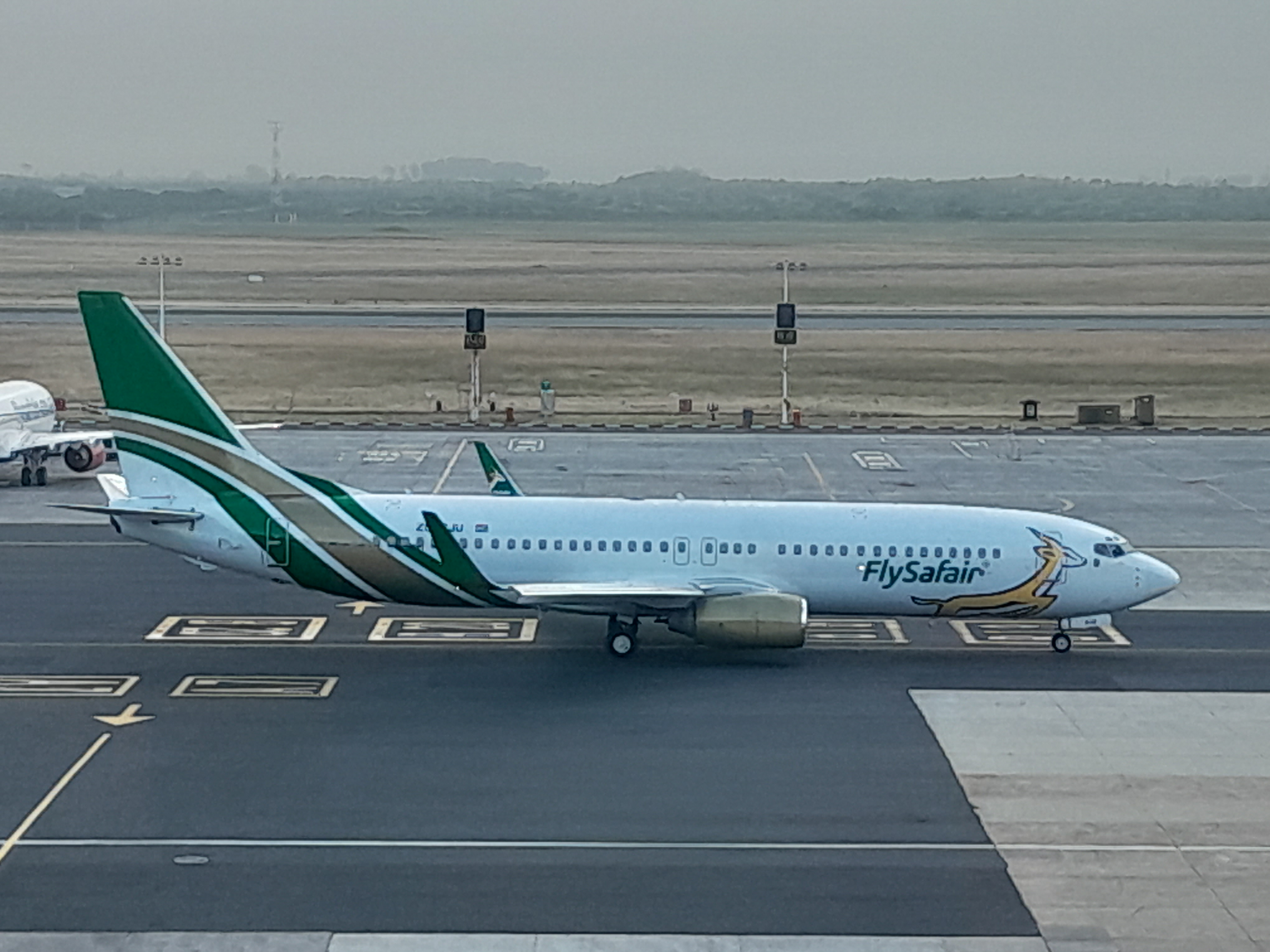
FlySafair Boeing 737-800 in a special livery commemorating the Springboks rugby team

== Recognition ==
In 2021, 2022, 2023, 2025, and 2026, FlySafair won the Best Low-Cost Airline in Africa award at the Skytrax World Airline Awards. The award is based on customer satisfaction voting.

In January 2026, FlySafair was ranked as the most on-time airline in the Middle East and Africa, in the Cirium 2025 On-Time Performance Review. The airline had 91.06% of its flights arrive on schedule. The on-time performance rating was actually the highest out of all airlines in the world, beating Aeromexico's 90.02%. However, the global ranking only considers the top 10% of airlines based on capacity and volume criteria, provided they serve at least three different regions. Being a largely domestic airline in a smaller regional market, FlySafair was not included in that category.

In September 2026, FlySafair was named the leading low-cost airline on the African continent at the 2026 World Travel Awards.

== Ownership ==
The legal entity trading as FlySafair is Safair Operations Pty Ltd. As of 2026, shareholders of Safair Operations are as follows:

Shareholder	Shareholding	Description	Ref
Safair Investment Trust	49.86%	Investment trust associated with the company's directors	
B4I Safair	25.14%	Employee ownership vehicle	
Safair Holdings	25.00%	Holding company ultimately owned by Irish company ASL Aviation Holdings	
Total	100.00%		

== Accidents and incidents ==
- On 12 November 2022, a South African Airways Airbus A320 (registered ZS-SZJ) was towed and collided with a parked FlySafair Boeing 737-800 (registered ZS-SJH) at O. R. Tambo International Airport. No passengers were onboard either aircraft at the time. The 737’s empennage section and A320's wingtip were damaged. Both aircraft were returned to service shortly after the incident.
- On 21 April 2024, a FlySafair Boeing 737-800 (registered ZS-FGE), operating flight FA212 from Johannesburg to Cape Town, lost one of its left main landing gear, #2 wheel on take-off. The aircraft burnt fuel after being made aware of the missing wheel, and made a low pass over O.R. Tambo International Airport for emergency services to assess damage. The wheel affected was one of the two attached to the left rear landing strut. Unfortunately, the landing resulted in further damage to the rim of the remaining wheel assembly. There were no injuries reported among the passengers or crew on board, but the incident did cause delays at the airport as crews worked to clear the runway.
- In July 2025, more than 200 FlySafair pilots, representing almost two-thirds of the airline’s cockpit crew, embarked on industrial action through the Solidarity trade union after rejecting a wage offer. The pilots requested a base salary increase of 10.5% for 2025/26, followed by annual increases of CPI plus 4.5% and CPI plus 4% in subsequent years. They also raised concerns about changes to rosters that they said negatively impacted leave allocation and work-life balance. FlySafair countered with a 5.7% increase to base pay, along with performance-based bonuses, which brought the overall cost-to-company increase to approximately 11.3%. The airline stated that this offer was both competitive and sustainable, given the broader economic environment. The strike began on 21 July 2025, resulting in the cancellation of about 12 to 13% of scheduled flights.

== See also ==
- List of airlines of South Africa
- Transport in South Africa
