= M65 (Durban) =

Metropolitan route in eThekwini, South Africa

Metropolitan route M65

Route information
- Maintained by the eThekwini Metropolitan Municipality
- Length: 4.3 km (2.7 mi)

Major junctions
- East end: N2 in La Mercy
- West end: R102 between Verulam and oThongathi

Location
- Country: South Africa
- Towns: La Mercy

Highway system
- Numbered routes of South Africa
← M59

The M65 also named Dube Boulevard is a short metropolitan route in the eThekwini Metropolitan Municipality, South Africa linking the N2 and R102 to King Shaka International Airport and Dube TradePort in La Mercy, north of Durban.

== Route ==
The M65 begins at the Exit 195 interchange with the N2 highway (to KwaDukuza and Durban) heading in a west-southwesterly direction. Motorists on the M65 exiting southwards to Durban pay toll at the King Shaka Ramp Plaza whilst motorists on the M65 exiting northwards to KwaDukuza pay toll at the oThongathi Mainline Toll Plaza, 7 km further on the N2.

It bypasses King Shaka International Airport's (KSIA) runway to the south before intersecting with the road to KSIA's car rental returns. The M65 proceeds to intersect with the road to KSIA's parking and terminal building and Dube City (Umsinsi Junction) and thereafter it intersects with International Trade Avenue (to Dube TradeZone and Dube Cargo Terminal).

The road proceeds to make a sharp right turn, intersecting with the road to Dube AgriHouse before ending at the intersection with the R102 to Verulam and oThongathi.
