= LIFT (airline) =

South African low-cost airline

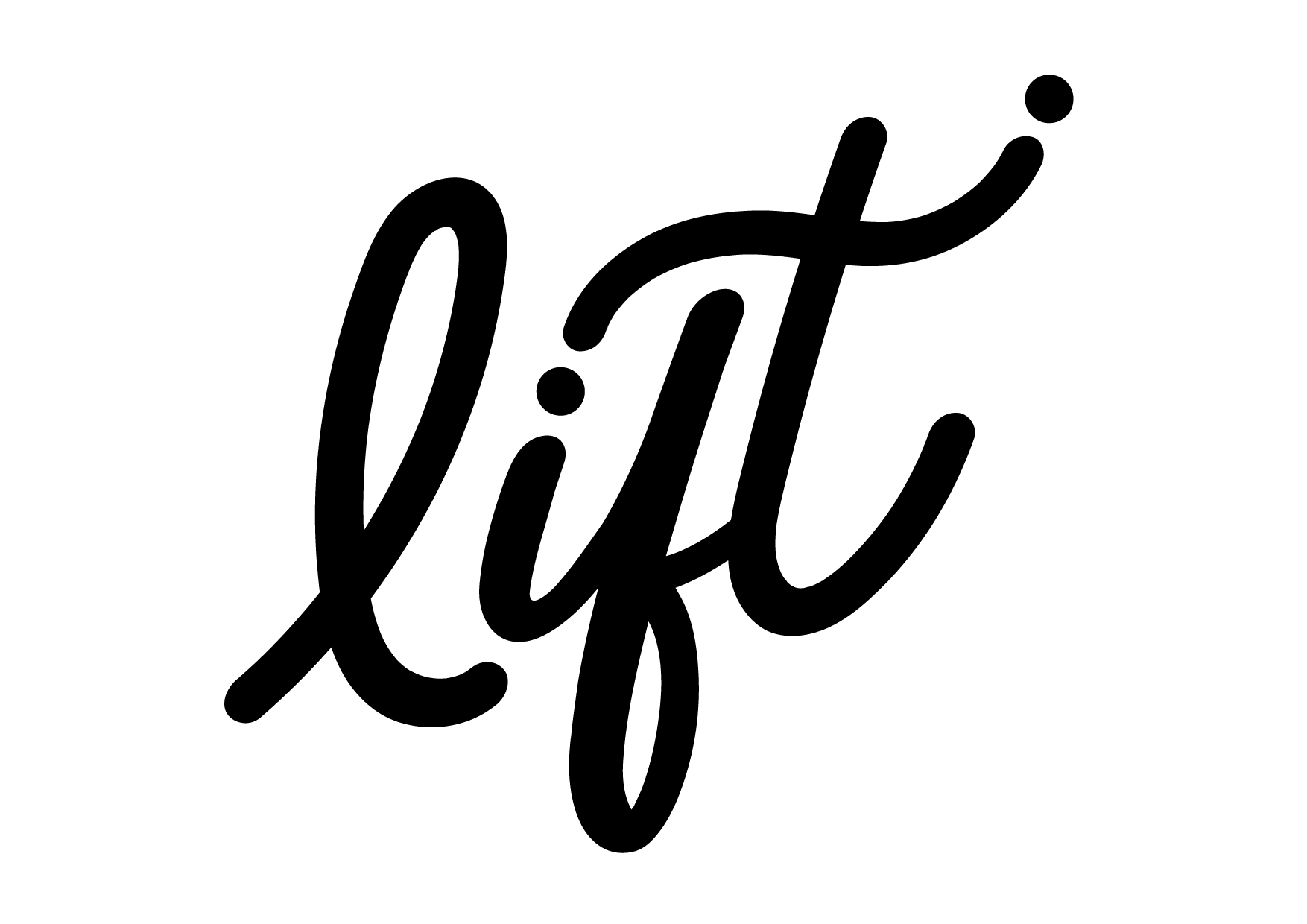

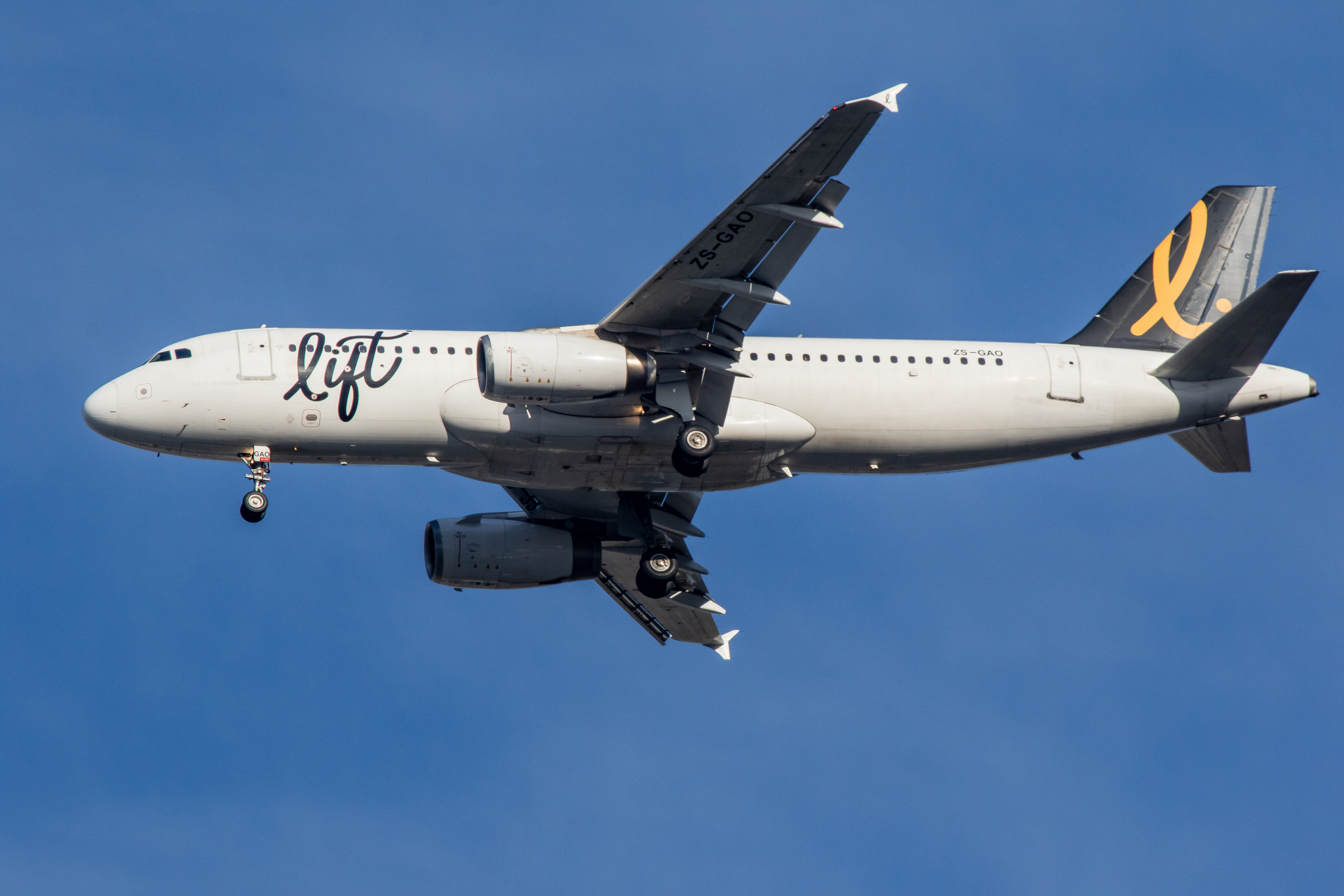
- LIFT Airbus A320-231
IATA	ICAO	Call sign
GE	GBB	GLOBE
- Founded: 2020
- Commenced operations: 10 December 2020; 5 years ago
- Hubs: O. R. Tambo International Airport
- Fleet size: 6
- Destinations: 3
- Parent company: Global Airways
- Headquarters: Cape Town, South Africa
- Key people: Cilliers Jordaan - Commercial Director
- Website: www.lift.co.za

LIFT (sometimes stylized in lowercase, and officially Global Aviation Operations), is a South African airline, based in Cape Town.

The company currently operates travel on domestic routes from a hub at O. R. Tambo International Airport, Johannesburg, using a fleet of Airbus A320 aircraft that are operated by Global Airways.

== History ==
LIFT was established in October 2020 and commenced operations on December 10, 2020 with three Airbus A320s. LIFT is a joint venture between former Comair CEO Gidon Novick, former Uber executive Jonathan Ayache, and Global Airways, a South African-based ACMI specialist that operates Airbus A320 & A340 aircraft. Other founder investors include entrepreneurs Rael Levitt and Alon Apteker.

The name LIFT was selected after the public were invited to name the airline in a social media campaign. LIFT Airline was selected after being submitted by eight contestants, who agreed to share the main prize of free flights for a year. Their names are inscribed on the body of the first three aircraft in the fleet. The airline's name was revealed on October 29, 2020.

== Destinations ==
As of December 2025, Lift serves the following scheduled destinations:

Country	City	Airport	Notes	Refs
South Africa	Cape Town	Cape Town International Airport		
South Africa	Durban	King Shaka International Airport		
South Africa	George	George Airport	Terminated	
South Africa	Johannesburg	O. R. Tambo International Airport	Hub	
Réunion	Saint-Pierre	Saint-Pierre de la Réunion		

== Fleet ==
As of August 2023, the LIFT fleet consists of six Airbus A320 aircraft, and has an additional four on order.

Aircraft	In service	Orders	Passengers			Notes	Refs
Aircraft	In service	Orders	C	Y	Total	Notes	Refs
Airbus A320-200	6	4	12	150	162	operated by Global Airways	
Total	6	4	—				

== See also ==
- Airlink, a South African regional airline.
- South African Airways, Flag national carrier of South Africa.
- FlySafair, a South African low-cost airline.
