= Cornubia City =

Cornubia City Development
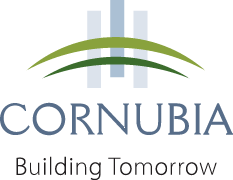
- Interactive map of the Cornubia City Development area
- Alternative names: Cornubia

General information
- Location: Cornubia City, KwaZulu-Natal, South Africa
- Coordinates: 29.713549°S 31.058222°E
- Construction started: 2012
- Completed: 2030
- Cost: US$1.9 Billion+ (R25 Billion+)
- Owner: eThekwini Metropolitan Municipality, Tongaat Hulett Developments and South African Sugar Association

Technical details
- Structural system: Mixed use

Design and construction
- Main contractor: eThekwini Metropolitan Municipality and Tongaat Hulett Developments

Website
- www.cornubia.co.za

Cornubia City is a mixed-use development situated north of Durban, South Africa between the towns of Phoenix, Verulam, Mount Edgecombe and uMhlanga.

Launched in 2012, the development project is a joint venture between the eThekwini Metropolitan Municipality and Tongaat Hulett. 482 homes were constructed in 2014 of the 24,000 residential units planned for the development; 15,000 of which will be low cost homes. A primary school opened 20 July 2015.

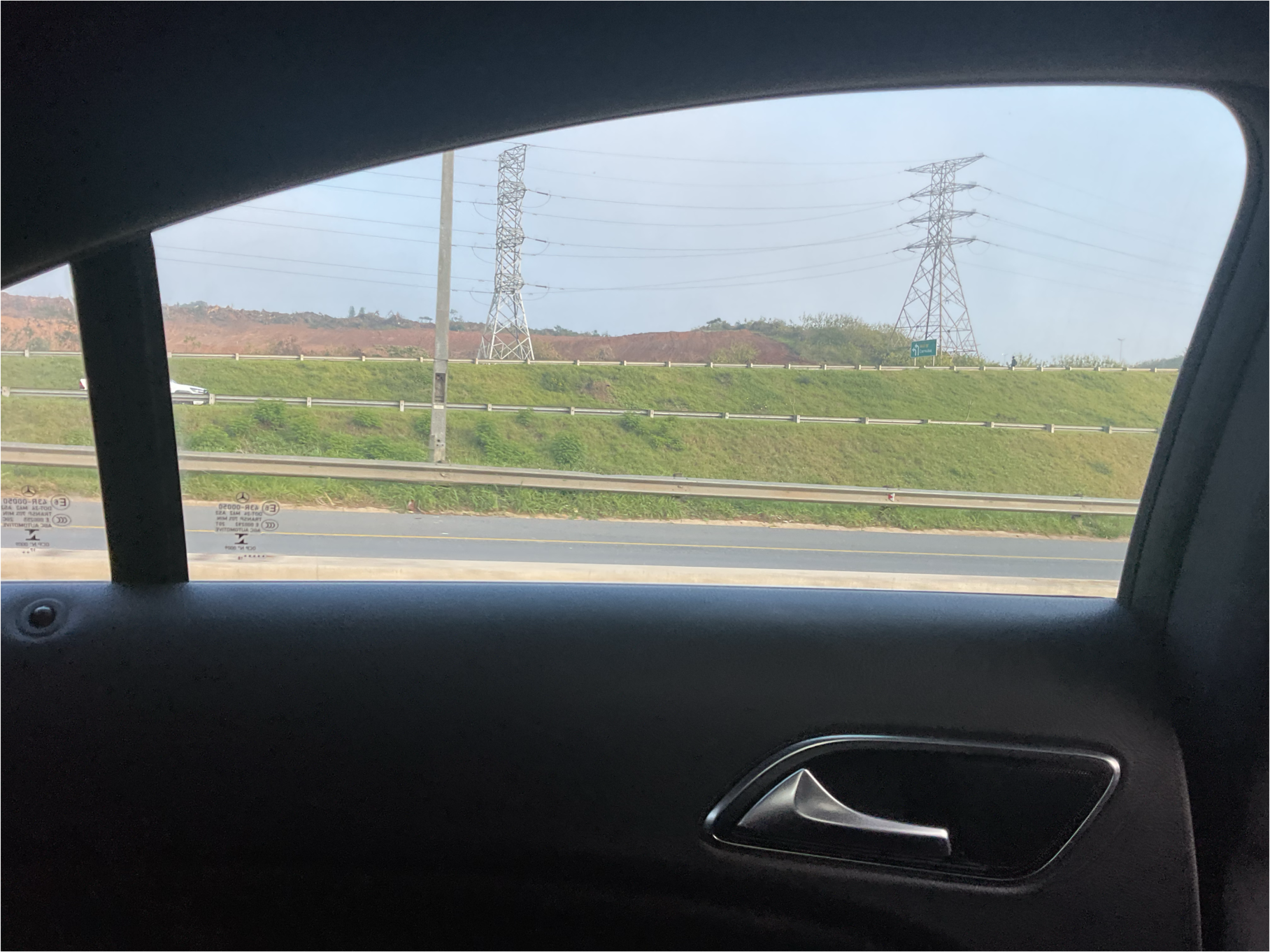
Cornubia City breaking ground in 2025

Cornubia is the first proposed sustainable and fully integrated human settlement in the region and has been declared a national priority project. It comprises 1,200 hectares (3,000 acres), with 80 hectares (200 acres) earmarked for industrial development and the remainder for commercial, housing and other social and public facilities including schools, clinics, police stations, post offices and multi-purpose halls. The projected completion date is 2030.

== Geography ==
Cornubia is situated approximately 20 kilometres (12.4 mi) north-west of Durban and 7 kilometres (4.3 mi) south of the King Shaka International Airport, neighboured by Verulam to the north, uMhlanga to the east, Mount Edgecombe to the south and Phoenix to the west.

== Industry ==
=== Cornubia Industrial and Business Estate ===
The Cornubia Industrial and Business Estate (CIBE) situated to the west near Ottawa (a suburb of Verulam), is the most established part of the Cornubia development, comprising 70 ha of platform land and 480 000m² of total permissible built floor area for light industrial uses, such as warehousing, distribution, service orientated business and offices.

In addition to Dube TradePort, approximately 7 kilometres to the north, Cornubia is the only development in KwaZulu-Natal where industrial purchasers and tenants can purchased fully serviced industrial land with development rights in the medium to long term.

The public spaces in the CIBE are collectively managed by the Cornubia Industrial and Business Estate Management Association, the public and private sector, the eThekwini Metropolitan Municipality, and surrounding local communities.

=== Cornubia Ridge Logistics Park ===
Cornubia Ridge Logistics Park is a light industrial complex developed by Fortress REIT Limited, situated east of Cornubia and adjacent to the N2. The 28-hectare logistics complex welcomed Makro as its first tenant in March 2019, marking Makro’s third outlet in the Greater Durban metropolitan region and its 22nd in South Africa. Officially launched in September 2019, Cornubia Ridge currently houses tenants such as Makro, Retailibility and Dromex.

== Retail ==
=== Cornubia Mall ===
Cornubia Mall, developed by Investec, was officially opened on 28 September 2017, at a development cost of R1.8 billion. It was developed as a regional shopping centre at a size of 65 0000m² GLA with approximately 110 tenants. Furthermore, the mall has space to further expand with plans to expand the centre by 20 000m².

Anchor tenants within Cornubia Mall include:

- Checkers
- Clicks
- Dis-Chem
- NuMetro
- Pick n Pay
- Truworths
- Virgin Active
- Woolworths

=== Food Lover’s Village ===
On 28 November 2024, Food Lover’s Market opened its very first retail village in Cornubia, adjacent to Cornubia Mall on the corner Allamanda Road and uMhlanga Ridge Boulevard. The R60 million development comprises a 2800 m² Food Lover’s Market as the anchor tenants supplemented by the Market Liquors, VetSmart, and Seattle Coffee Company.

=== Leroy Merlin ===
French home improvement retailer, Leroy Merlin recently announced in November 2025 that it would be constructing a new 10 000 m² outlet in Cornubia at a development cost of R220 million led by the Fundamentum Property Group. Expected to open in November 2026, the Cornubia outlet will become its first outlet in South Africa outside of Gauteng.

== Transport ==
=== Roads ===
Cornubia is bordered by major arterial routes, including the N2 to the east, M41 to the south and the R102 to the west:

- The N2 freeway connects Durban to the south with King Shaka International Airport and KwaDukuza to the north.
- The M41 freeway connects uMhlanga to the east with Phoenix to the west.
- The R102 (North Coast Road) connects Verulam to the north-west with Mount Edgecombe to the south.

Other roads of importance enhancing Cornubia’s road connectivity include:

- M47 (uMhlanga Ridge Boulevard) – connects Cornubia with uMhlanga to the east
- MR458 (JG Champion Drive) – connects the CIBE with Phoenix to the east
- Old North Coast Road – connects Ottawa to the north-west with Mount Edgecombe to the south

=== Road Developments ===
The R140 million double-carriageway and the double road-over-rail bridge on the MR458 (JG Champion Drive) was officially opened at the end of February 2016, significantly improving access directly into the Cornubia Industrial and Business Estate from the R102. Previously, access into the CIBE was limited to a single lane from the R102, which had to be upgraded to encompass the growing volumes of traffic.

To provide efficient traffic flow, the single lane road remained open, functioning as the main access point to Cornubia’s housing development, while JG Champion Drive became the main entrance into the CIBE.

== Zones ==
Currently Cornubia comprises:

- A general business zone to the south near the M41 (including Cornubia Mall and Food Lover’s Village)
- A general business zone to the east along the N2 (including Cornubia Ridge Logistics Park)
- A residential zone to the west near the R102
- Cornubia Industrial and Business Estate (CIBE) to the west

According to its master plan, Cornubia is expected comprise additional zones in the future such as a future high density residential zone, a future general business zone, a future residential zone and two future industrial zones.
