= Mount Edgecombe =

- Town
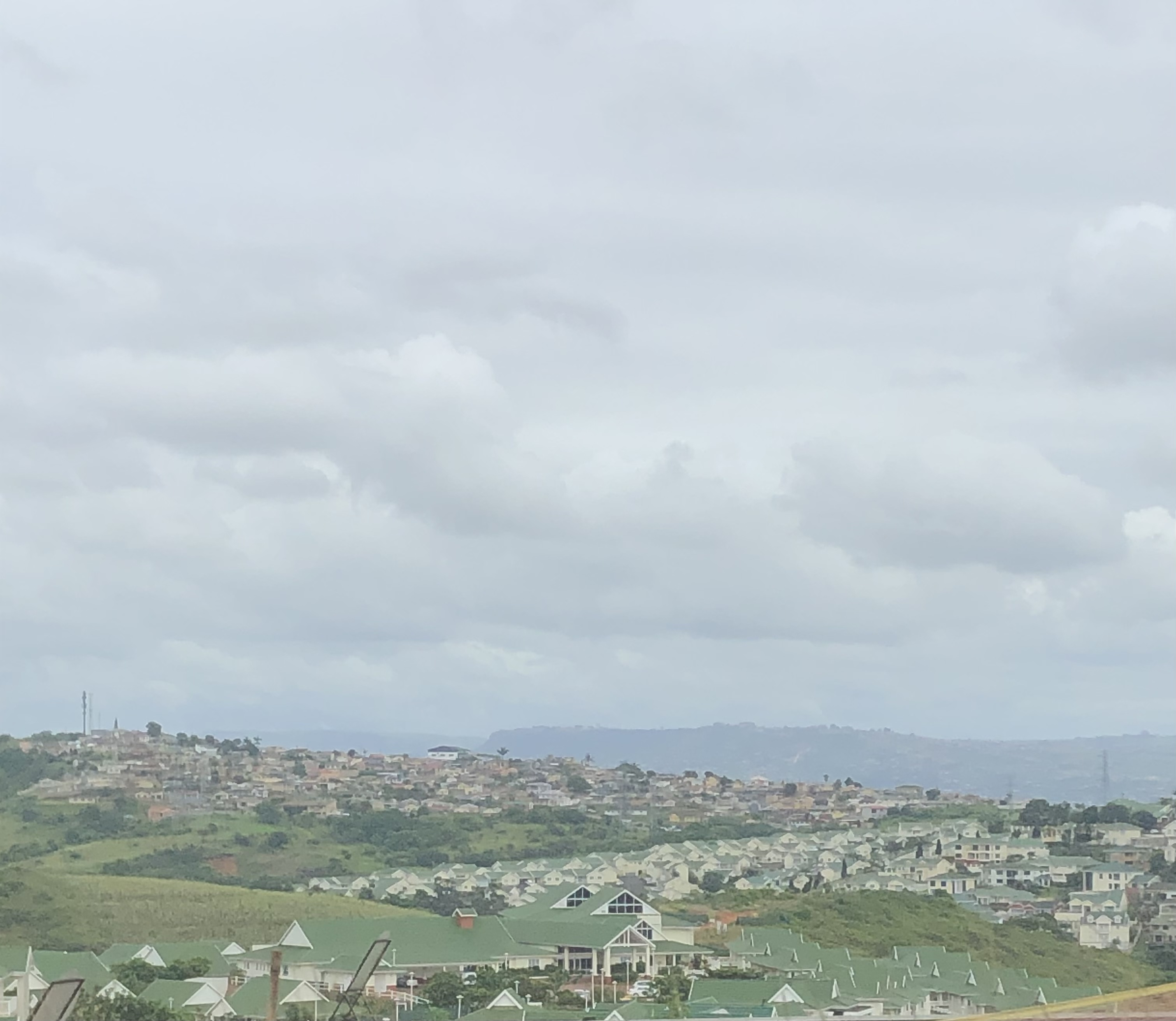
- View of the Mt Edgecombe Country Club Estate with Phoenix in the background

- Location within KwaZulu-Natal Location within South Africa
- Coordinates: 29.721°S 31.050°E
- Country: South Africa
- Province: KwaZulu-Natal
- Municipality: eThekwini

Area
  - Total: 8.34 km^{2} (3.22 sq mi)

Population (2011)
  - Total: 7,323
  - Density: 878/km^{2} (2,270/sq mi)

Racial makeup (2011)
  - Black African: 10.5%
  - Coloured: 1.5%
  - Indian/Asian: 36.5%
  - White: 50.0%
  - Other: 1.5%

First languages (2011)
  - English: 84.1%
  - Afrikaans: 4.8%
  - Zulu: 4.4%
  - Other: 6.7%
- Time zone: UTC+2 (SAST)
- Postal code (street): 4302
- PO box: 4300

Mount Edgecombe or Mt Edgecombe is a town in KwaZulu-Natal, South Africa, situated just north of Durban, which forms part of eThekwini, the Greater Durban Metropolitan area. Much of the suburb is cordoned off as a gated settlement comprising resorts, golf courses and a retirement home. It was previously a sugar growing area. The population increased by 89% between 2001 and 2011 from 3,874 to 7,323. Its name is derived from Mount Edgcumbe House in Cornwall, England, the family seat of the Earls of Mount Edgcumbe.

== Geography ==
Mount Edgecombe is situated in a hilly area just 4 kilometres (2.5 mi) inland from the coastal resort of uMhlanga Rocks and approximately 14 kilometres (8.7 mi) northeast of the Durban CBD. Bordered by the N2 to the east, the M41 to the north, and the R102 to the west, it neighbours uMhlanga to the east and Phoenix to the west. The area features three distinct areas: the Mount Edgecombe Country Club Estate, an industrial area to the west and a retail precinct to the north.

== Culture and contemporary lifestyle ==
Mount Edgecombe Country Club Estate has long held its reputation as the most expensive estate in the Greater Durban metropolitan area and comprises two smaller golf estates, numbered 1 and 2 which contain their respective championship golf courses.

== Economy ==
=== Sugar ===
Mount Edgecombe, historically a prominent sugarcane growing region, is now the centre of South Africa's sugar industry. It hosts the corporate headquarters of the South African Sugar Research Institute and the South African Sugar Association.

Though much of the surrounding farmland has been developed, Mount Edgecombe still borders expansive sugarcane plantations to the north, marking the change from suburban development to the rural countryside.

=== Industries ===
Mount Edgecombe is a smaller industrial centre in the Greater Durban metropolitan area, primarily hosting light industries like hardware and logistics, including the head office and distribution centre for Freedom Stationery and the regional distribution centre for Spar (perishables).

=== Retail ===
While primarily a residential area, Mount Edgecombe also boasts a retail precinct along Flanders Drive, featuring the Flanders Boutique Mall and a diverse range of automotive and technology businesses. A key landmark is the Cornubia Mall, a 65,000-square-metre (700,000 sq ft) shopping centre opened on 27 September 2017, part of Cornubia City, a planned smart city developed on former sugarcane land by Tongaat Hulett.

== Infrastructure ==
=== Healthcare ===
Mount Edgecombe is served by Life Mount Edgecombe Hospital, a private facility owned by the Life Healthcare Group. Situated in the suburb of Rockford, which falls under Phoenix, the hospital lies at the boundary between Phoenix and Mount Edgecombe.

=== Rail ===
Mount Edgecombe is served by the Mount Edgecombe Railway Station, located on the North Coast Line, which runs between Durban (via Phoenix) and KwaDukuza (via Verulam) and is operated by Metrorail.

=== Roads ===
The N2 Outer Ring Road is a north/south freeway, connecting Mount Edgecombe with Durban to the south and with King Shaka International Airport and KwaDukuza to the north, while the M41 is an east/west freeway, connecting Mount Edgecombe with uMhlanga to the east.

The R102 is a north/south regional route connecting Verulam with Durban that by-passes Mount Edgecombe to the west as North Coast Road. The M26 is an east/west metropolitan route connecting Mount Edgecombe with Phoenix as Phoenix Highway. Old North Coast Road is a north/south local route connecting Mount Edgecombe with Ottawa (a suburb of Verulam).

==== Developments ====
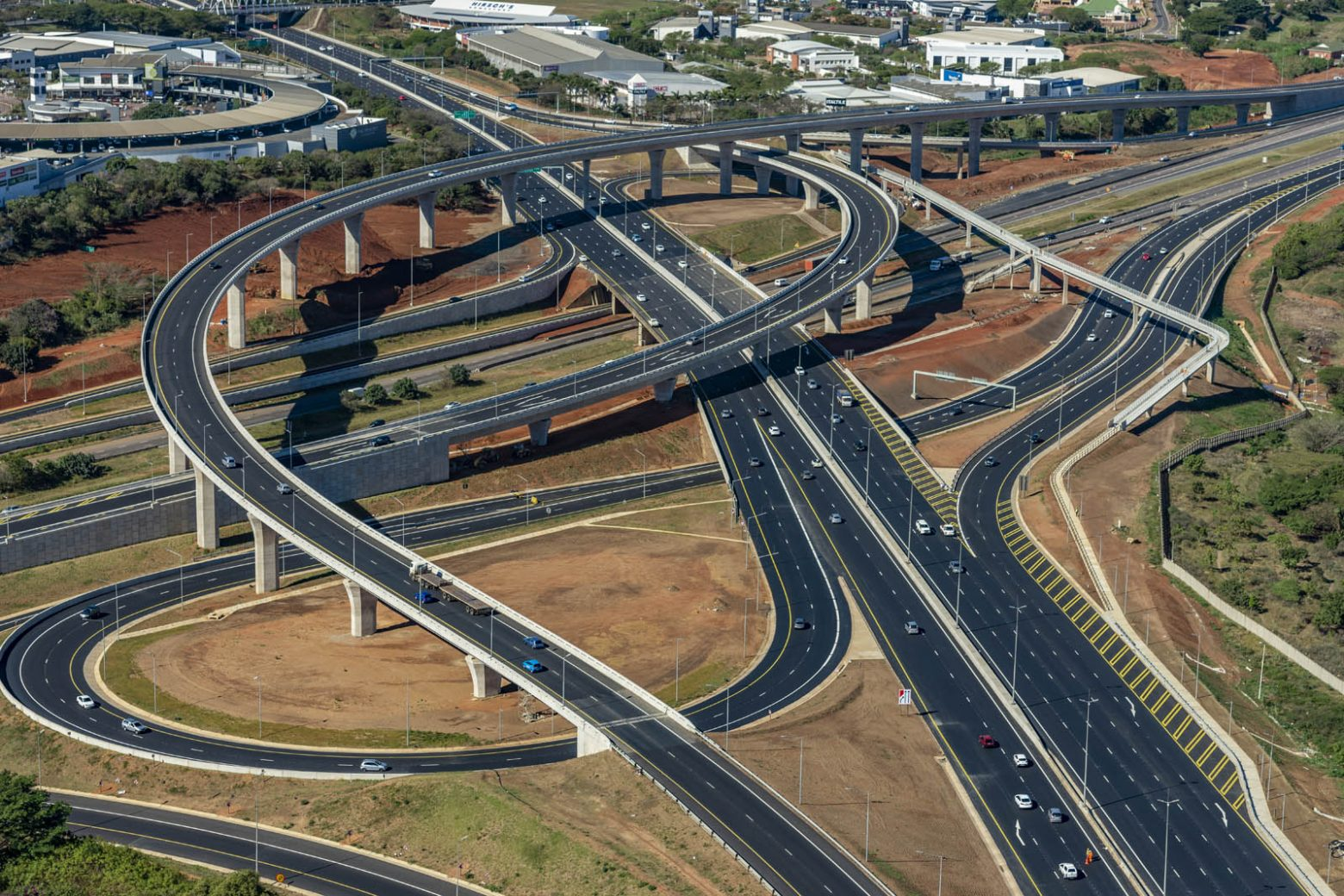
The newly upgraded Mount Edgecombe Interchange

The Mount Edgecombe Interchange, recently upgraded in October 2018, serves as the connection between the N2 and M41 freeways. It has become a prominent landmark in Mount Edgecombe, particularly due to one of its flyovers, which is the longest incrementally launched bridge in South Africa, spanning 948 meters.

== See also ==
- Illovo Sugar
