= Exercise Vigilant Eagle =

Military exercises

Countries participating in the exercise

Exercise Vigilant Eagle is a series of trilateral military exercises involving the armed forces of Canada, Russia, and the United States. The exercise is designed to prepare the Russian Air Force and the North American Aerospace Defense Command (NORAD) to undertake coordinated air intercept missions against hijacked civilian aircraft. Four such exercises have been held.

== Background ==
Billed by its Russian, American, and Canadian participants as a first-of-its-kind exercise for the former Cold War adversaries, Vigilant Eagle was described by Russian Air Force Col. Alexander Vasilyev as a means to "develop procedures and bring the relationship between our countries closer together to unite our countries in the fight against terrorism”. The groundwork for Vigilant Eagle was laid in a June 2003 meeting in St. Petersburg, Russia between President of the United States George W. Bush and President of the Russian Federation Vladimir Putin. Coming less than two years after the September 11 attacks, and in the aftermath of an increase in Russian-American tensions resulting from the 2003 invasion of Iraq, the meeting saw progress in developing informal comity for bilateral cooperation in areas of anti-terrorism.

== Exercises ==
=== Vigilant Eagle 2010 ===
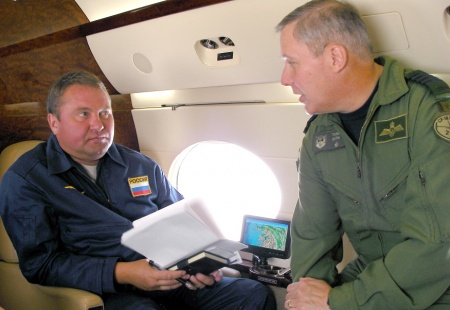
Russian and Canadian Air Force officers fly together aboard a simulated hijacked aircraft during Vigilant Eagle 2010.

The first Vigilant Eagle exercise was planned for 2008 but postponed until 2010 due to the Russo-Georgian War. According to the U.S. government, that exercise marked "the first live-flying event between Russia and the United States since the Second World War."

=== Vigilant Eagle 2011 ===
A second Exercise Vigilant Eagle was held in 2011. In the exercise scenario, a U.S. civilian airliner operating near the Russia–United States northern border was seized by terrorists and flown towards Russia. The scenario was then repeated in reverse, with an aircraft originating in Russian airspace violating NORAD's Alaskan Air Defense Sector where it was intercepted and "repelled from North American airspace."

The exercise tested the ability of the Federal Aviation Administration to contact both Russian Air Force and NORAD authorities and of NORAD and the Russian Air Force to effectively liaise with each other in tracking and intercepting the hijacked aircraft. The aircraft used to represent the U.S. airliner was a civilian-crewed passenger aircraft chartered from Global Aviation.

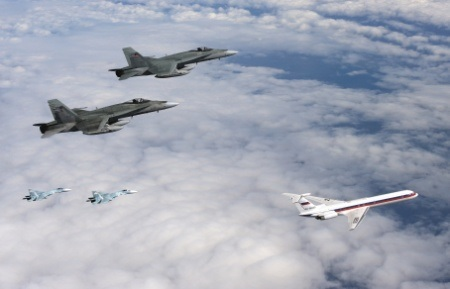
CF-18s of the Royal Canadian Air Force and Su-27s of the Russian Air Force escort a simulated hijacked aircraft during Vigilant Eagle 2013.

=== Vigilant Eagle 2012 ===
Vigilant Eagle 2012 was a command post exercise (CPX) held in 2012 that, for the first time, did not include live-flying aircraft, instead using computer simulations.

=== Vigilant Eagle 2013 ===
Exercise Vigilant Eagle 2013 was conducted in August 2013. The exercise again involved a live-flying element with CF-18s of the Royal Canadian Air Force intercepting a civilian airliner west of Denali after the aircraft reported a "hijacking" following take-off from Ted Stevens International Airport. The mission was then handed off to the Russian Air Force as the aircraft passed over the international boundary. After completion of the mission, the exercise was repeated in reverse with a Russia-originating aircraft reporting a "hijacking" on an approach toward the international boundary.

== Future exercises ==
A planned Vigilant Eagle 2014 was suspended due to tensions between the United States and Canada on one side, and the Russian Federation on the other, over the War in Donbass. The exercise would have involved, for the first time, the Japan Air Self Defense Force. According to American and Canadian officials, the exercises were canceled at their initiative.

== See also ==
- Canada–Russia relations
- Russia–United States relations
