= Air One Nine Company =

Airline of Libya

IATA	ICAO	Call sign
N6	ONR	EDER
- Founded: 2004
- Hubs: Tripoli International Airport
- Fleet size: 2
- Headquarters: Tripoli, Libya

Air One Nine Company (Arabic: واحد تسعة للطيران) was a charter airline based in Tripoli, Libya.

== Fleet ==
=== Current ===
The Air One Nine Company fleet included the following aircraft (at 30 May 2010):

- 2 Douglas DC-9-32 (which are operated by Global Aviation Operations)

=== Retired ===
- 1 Douglas DC-9-32 (operated by Global Aviation Operations)
- 1 Fokker F28 Mk4000 (operated by Montenegro Airlines)
