= M41 (Durban) =

Metropolitan route in eThekwini, South Africa

Metropolitan route M41

Route information
- Maintained by eThekwini Metropolitan Municipality
- Length: 6.5 km (4.0 mi)

Major junctions
- South-east end: M4 in uMhlanga Rocks
- M12 in uMhlanga; N2 in uMhlanga/Mount Edgecombe
- North-west end: R102 in Mount Edgecombe

Location
- Country: South Africa
- Towns: uMhlanga, Mount Edgecombe

Highway system
- Numbered routes of South Africa
← M39	→ M43

The M41 is a metropolitan route in the eThekwini Metropolitan Municipality, South Africa linking uMhlanga to Mount Edgecombe and Phoenix, north of the city of Durban.

== Route ==
The M41 begins at the M4 (Leo Boyd Highway) interchange in uMhlanga Rocks and runs as a double-carriageway freeway for its entire length. At this interchange, drivers on the M41 are restricted to exiting southbound onto the M4 towards Durban, while only those traveling northbound on the M4 can enter the M41. The road ascends the uMhlanga ridge, running northwards along the edge of La Lucia and separating the business districts of Ridgeside and La Lucia Ridge. It reaches the Ridgeside Drive off-ramp shortly after.

Once the M41 crests the ridge, it veers north-west, where it intersects the M12 uMhlanga Rocks Drive, dividing the suburbs of uMhlanga Ridge and La Lucia Ridge. As it proceeds further, it connects with the Millennium Way off-ramp before reaching the N2 highway at the Mount Edgecombe Interchange.

After crossing the N2, the M41 continues northwest, with Mount Edgecombe on its southern side and Cornubia to the north, eventually reaching the Flanders Drive off-ramp. Shortly after this, it ends at an interchange with the R102, positioned between Mount Edgecombe and Phoenix.
