= Rael Levitt =

South African auctioneer

- Born: May 10, 1971 (age 55); South Africa
- Education: University of Cape Town, UCLA Anderson School of Management and the National University of Singapore
- Occupations: Entrepreneur, author and business leader
- Known for: Developing real estate auctions and last-mile logistics parks in South Africa

Rael Levitt (born 10 May 1971) is a South African entrepreneur, author and business leader. Levitt founded multiple real estate, investment and technology companies. He is best known for developing both real estate auctions and last-mile logistics parks in South Africa.

== Early life and education ==
Levitt was born in South Africa in 1971 and obtained a double master's degree from the UCLA Anderson School of Management and the National University of Singapore.

== Career ==
=== Early career ===
While studying at the University of Cape Town, Levitt sold his first property in 1989. In August 1992, he conducted his first auction on behalf of Absa Bank Ltd and at the age of 21 founded his first auction company, Levco Auctions. Three years later Levitt sold Levco Auctions to Seeff Holdings Ltd and merged the two companies. Levitt was appointed CEO of the merged company that was renamed Seeff Auctions.

=== Auction Alliance ===
After the delisting of Seeff Holdings Ltd in 1998, Levitt completed a management buyout of Seeff Auctions, renamed the company Auction Alliance and became its CEO. In 2006, Auction Alliance sold a 25.1% stake to Amabubesi Investments and in 2010 a 31% stake to Transaction Capital. By 2011 Auction Alliance's turnover was over R300 million, with sales of over R6 billion. In 2011, after a well-publicized dispute arose at an auction, Levitt voluntarily closed Auction Alliance.

=== Inospace ===
In 2017, Levitt founded Inospace, an owner and manager of last-mile logistics parks. The company began with one site in Epping, Cape Town and grew rapidly through innovative asset management and strategic acquisitions. Under Levitt's leadership, Inospace grew its assets to over R3billion. In 2022, Inospace concluded a R1,25billion transaction with Fortress REIT Ltd. In 2023, Inospace began offering a range of logistics services including flexible warehousing and fulfilment services to e-commerce businesses

=== Lisa Proptech ===
In 2023, Dutch-based technology platform Lisa BV acquired the core leasing technology platform from Inospace, South Africa's largest last-mile logistics operator. Levitt was appointed as the CEO.

=== Lift Airline ===
Levitt was a founding shareholder of Lift Airline, which launched on 10 December 2020. Lift operated on major domestic routes from O. R. Tambo International Airport, Johannesburg using a fleet of Airbus A320 narrow body aircraft, operated by Global Aviation. In 2024, Levitt reduced his interests in Lift and remains as a non-executive director of the airline.

== Bibliography ==
It Takes a Tsunami (2022), published by Mercury.

== Community positions ==
In 2010 Levitt was appointed as the Chairman of YAD. He was appointed a trustee of the Rambam Trust, a board member of Glendale care services and the United Jewish Campaign. Levitt is the founding trustee of the Red Circle Trust, which focuses on entrepreneurial educational development.
