= Phoenix, KwaZulu-Natal =

Phoenix
- Location within KwaZulu-Natal Location within South Africa
- Coordinates: 29.701°S 31.004°E
- Country: South Africa
- Province: KwaZulu-Natal
- Municipality: eThekwini

Area
  - Total: 30.16 km^{2} (11.64 sq mi)

Population (2011)
  - Total: 176,989
  - Density: 5,868/km^{2} (15,200/sq mi)

Racial makeup (2011)
  - Black African: 12.1%
  - Coloured: 1.8%
  - Indian/Asian: 85.0%
  - White: 0.2%
  - Other: 0.9%

First languages (2011)
  - English: 87.4%
  - Zulu: 8.1%
  - Other: 4.5%
- Time zone: UTC+2 (SAST)
- Postal code (street): 4068
- PO box: 4080
- Area code: 031

Phoenix is a South African town about 25 kilometres (15 mi) northwest of Durban Central, in KwaZulu-Natal, South Africa. It was established as a town by the apartheid government in 1979, but it has a long history of Indian occupation. It is associated with the Phoenix Settlement, built by Mahatma Gandhi.

In 2021, riots broke out in KwaZulu-Natal after the imprisonment of former president Jacob Zuma. The riots also occurred in Phoenix and armed citizen militias were formed. There were violent clashes between the communities and rioters from nearby settlements like Inanda, which caused the deaths of 36 people and increased racial tensions between Indian and black communities in the area.

== History ==
The township was founded initially as a sugarcane estate. After the passing of the Group Areas Act, a law which designated specific regions for occupation by specific races, Phoenix became an Indian township. Sections were initially labelled as precincts or units, and then later renamed with proper street addresses.

=== 2021 KZN riots ===
Following the imprisonment of former president Jacob Zuma for contempt of court, riots broke out in KwaZulu-Natal on July 9, 2021. Phoenix was among the towns affected. Shops were looted and property was vandalised. Due to a lack of police response during the riots, citizen militias formed to patrol the town and set up roadblocks to prevent rioters from entering the area and looters from absconding with stolen goods. Physical altercations then occurred between the Phoenix community and interlopers from the nearby predominantly black community of Inanda. Police Minister Bheki Cele claimed that 20 deaths occurred in Phoenix as a result of such clashes.

The riots exacerbated racial tensions between the Indian and black communities in the area, and led to accusations of racism at the Indian community by the black community.

Fake reports of further violence and killings sprung up on social networks in the aftermath. Following the unrest, supporters of Zuma marched to protest the Phoenix killings.

== Places in Phoenix ==
Until the early 1990s, Phoenix was divided into 'units' by the local government. However, many local people still refer to areas by their unit numbers.

The Phoenix area in Durban, South Africa, has a number of religious establishments, including mosques, temples, and churches. Magmore Place and Corngrove Road are the main access routes to the following establishments & public facilities such as the Stanmore Library, Grove End Clinic, Stanmore Swimming Pool, and Mahatma Park. During the July 2021 riots, Magmore Place and Corngrove Road were illegally blocked off, preventing black people from accessing the area. This demonstration of segregation caused racial tension and division in the community, with residents of other roads also unable to access public facilities.

Streets in Phoenix
- Corngrove road (unit 17)
- Magmore pl (unit 17)
- Brookdale (Unit 12)
- Grove End (Unit 17)
- Stanmore
- Eastbury (Unit 7)
- Southgate
- Greenbury (Unit 2)
- Furnham
- Stonebridge (Unit 4)
- Centenary Park
- Campbellstown (Unit 6)
- Centenary Heights
- Rockford (Unit 6)
- Clayfield (Unit 5)
- Longcroft (Unit 8)
- Rydalvale (Unit 9)
- Terrance Manor
- Shastri Park
- Sunford Drive (Unit 15)
- Palmview
- Caneside (Unit 20)
- Foresthaven (Unit 21)
- Woodview
- Rainham (Unit 3)
- Redfern
- Whetstone (Unit 10)
- Rexham
- Westham (Unit 12)

== Media and communication ==
Local news is distributed via regional newspapers such as the Rising Sun, the Post and Phoenix Tabloid, Daily News & Mercury, and Sunday times In terms of telecommunications and Internet access, 99% of Phoenix is covered by either wireless internet connection such as fibre optics, 5G, 4G, LTE, UMTS, EDGE, and HSDPA, or has access to a landline/ADSL. The majority of ADSL users in Phoenix use Telkomsa as their Internet service provider.

There are also many local Facebook pages that are used to relay news and crime related incidents, such as the Grove End & Stanmore page.

== Health and education ==
Public education in the Phoenix area is provided by various primary and secondary schools, one technikon and various FET colleges. There is one major government hospital (Mahatma Gandhi Memorial Hospital), and one private hospital (Life Mount Edgecombe Hospital). Various clinics are also to be found, e. g. Grove End Clinic.

List of schools
- Allingham Primary School
- Am Moolla Spes Nova School
- Avonford Secondary School
- Brailsford Primary School
- Brookdale Primary School
- Brookdale Secondary School
- Clayhaven Primary School
- Clayheights Primary School
- Clayridge Primary School
- Crystal Point Secondary School
- Daleview Secondary School
- Earlington Secondary School
- Eastbury Secondary School
- Eastview Primary School
- Esselen Heights Primary School
- Ferndale Secondary (Combined) School
- Foresthaven Secondary School
- Grandmore Primary School
- Greenbury Primary School
- Greenbury Secondary School
- Greenheights Primary School
- Grove End Secondary School
- Havenpark Secondary School
- Highstone Primary School
- Hopeville Primary School
- Lenarea Secondary School
- Lenham Primary School
- Longcroft Primary School
- Mahatma Primary School
- Millview Primary School
- Mount Royal Combined School
- Natest Primary School
- Northlen Primary School
- Northmead Secondary School
- Northview Primary School
- Olympia Primary School
- Palmcroft Primary School
- Palmview Primary School
- Palmview Secondary School
- Phoenix Heights Primary School
- Phoenix Pioneer Primary School
- Phoenix Secondary School
- Phoenix Technical Secondary School
- Redfern Primary School
- Riverview Primary School
- Rockford Primary School
- Rustic Manor Primary School
- Rydal Park Secondary School
- Rydalvale Primary School
- S.Dass School
- Sastri Park Secondary School
- Siphosethu Primary School
- Skylark Primary School
- Solvista Secondary School
- Stanmore Primary School
- Stanmore Secondary School
- Sterngrove Primary School
- Stonebridge Primary School
- Sunford Primary School
- Swanvale Primary School
- Toc Educare Academy
- Trenance Manor Secondary School
- Wembley Primary School
- Westham Secondary School
- Whetstone Primary School
- Woodview Primary School
- Woodview Secondary School
- Phoenix Teachers Centre
- palmcroft primary school (unit 8)

== Shopping centres ==
Phoenix Plaza, Gem City, Starwood Mall, The Acropolis Mall and Top Hat Supermarket, Checksave, Check Mart and multiple spaza shops are some of the few shopping centres that can be found in Phoenix's CBD. These centres cater to various needs from top brand shops to local products.

=== Phoenix Plaza ===
The Phoenix Plaza is a large shopping mall in the Phoenix area of Durban, South Africa. It is the largest shopping mall in the north of Durban and serves a catchment area of over 1 million people. The mall was opened in 1993 and has since been expanded and renovated on several occasions.

The Phoenix Plaza has a wide range of stores, including major department stores, fashion retailers, restaurants, and entertainment options. There is also a large food court with a variety of cuisines to choose from.

In 2022, the Phoenix Plaza underwent a major refurbishment. This included the addition of new stores and restaurants, as well as the renovation of existing stores and common areas. The mall also received a new logo and branding.

== Transport ==
=== Public Transport ===
Three main means of public transport are available: privately owned buses, taxis (including Uber & Taxify), and the rail system. Phoenix has its own railway station which connects to many towns in the Greater Durban region such as Mount Edgecombe, Verulam, Tongaat (now oThongathi) and Stanger (now KwaDukuza). The King Shaka International Airport is a short drive away, which provides various outlets. Totaling 175 at its peak in the mid-90s, Phoenix had one of the largest numbers of privately owned buses in South Africa. The two bus services that contributed to the transport landscape of the area were Mayville Coach Lines and Springfield Safari Tours (SOS).

=== Routes ===
The M26 (Phoenix Highway) is the main route intersecting Phoenix, rounding through the township between the intersections with the R102 at Chris Hani Road/Old North Coast Road (to Ottawa) and Hillhead Drive (to Mount Edgecombe).

Bordering to the east, the R102 runs northwards from Durban to Verulam and provides access to the M41 freeway (to uMhlanga). Bordering to the south-west, the M25 Curnick Ndlovu Highway runs north-westwards from Durban to Inanda.

Other than the metropolitan and regional routes, Phoenix is also served by the MR458 (JG Champion Drive) connecting eastwards to the Cornubia Industrial and Business Estate.

Subsequent to December 1st 2023, vehicle registration plates in Phoenix started with "ZN" - "N" for Natal & "Z" for (Kwa)Zulu.

== Industrial sector ==
Phoenix also hosts a sizeable developing industrial area with big companies, such as the beverage producer SABMiller. Tradeport Distribution, which is the largest distribution company in KwaZulu-Natal, is also located in this industrial park.
