= Mount Moreland =

- Location within KwaZulu-Natal Location within South Africa
- Coordinates: 29°38′S 31°05′E
- Country: South Africa
- Province: KwaZulu-Natal
- Municipality: eThekwini

Area
  - Total: 0.85 km^{2} (0.33 sq mi)

Population (2011)
  - Total: 241
  - Density: 280/km^{2} (730/sq mi)

Racial makeup (2011)
  - Black African: 10.8%
  - Coloured: 0.4%
  - Indian/Asian: 10.4%
  - White: 76.7%
  - Other: 1.7%

First languages (2011)
  - English: 79.6%
  - Afrikaans: 12.9%
  - Xhosa: 2.5%
  - Zulu: 1.2%
  - Other: 3.8%
- Time zone: UTC+2 (SAST)
- Postal code (street): 4339
- PO box: 4345

Mount Moreland is a small community located in the eThekwini municipality in KwaZulu-Natal, South Africa. It is located slightly inland of Umdloti, just over 30 kilometres (19 mi) north of the city of Durban, and 2.6 kilometres (1.6 mi) to the south of Durban's King Shaka International Airport.

The community is known as being the location of an important roosting site for the European barn swallow and accordingly attracts visitors to the area mid October to mid April.
