= Ottawa, KwaZulu-Natal =

Ottawa
- Location within KwaZulu-Natal Location within South Africa
- Coordinates: 29°40′S 31°02′E
- Country: South Africa
- Province: KwaZulu-Natal
- Municipality: eThekwini
- Main Place: Verulam

Area
  - Total: 2.39 km^{2} (0.92 sq mi)

Population (2011)
  - Total: 4,706
  - Density: 1,970/km^{2} (5,100/sq mi)

Racial makeup (2011)
  - Black African: 17.4%
  - Coloured: 1.8%
  - Indian/Asian: 79.2%
  - White: 0.4%
  - Other: 1.1%

First languages (2011)
  - English: 82.3%
  - Zulu: 12.1%
  - Afrikaans: 1.4%
  - Southern Ndebele: 1.1%
  - Other: 3.2%
- Time zone: UTC+2 (SAST)
- Postal code (street): 4339
- PO box: 4345

Ottawa is a suburb of Verulam situated in the KwaZulu-Natal Province of South Africa, approximately 26 kilometres (16.2 mi) north of Durban.

== History ==
Ottawa was originally a sugarcane estate, founded in 1861 by Anthony Wilkinson. On the site was a cane spirits distillery and sugar mill on the oHlanga River, which runs through the area.

The name Ottawa, from the Canadian capital city, was chosen as an homage to Wilkinson's wife, who was Canadian.

== Geography ==
Ottawa is situated on the northern banks of the oHlanga River and sits as the southernmost suburb of Verulam, approximately 1 kilometre (0.6 mi) south of the CBD. It is bounded by Phoenix to the south, Cornubia to the east, Southridge to the north, Mzomuhle to the west and Mountview to the north-west.

== Transport ==
=== Roads ===
Ottawa is traversed by the R102 which connects oThongathi to the north with Mount Edgecombe to the south. Alternatively, Old Main Road is another main road in Ottawa connecting the M27 Jabu Ngcobo Drive (to Verulam CBD and eMdloti) to the north with Phoenix and Mount Edgecombe to the south.
