= YOFC =

Chinese optical fiber company

Yangtze Optical Fibre and Cable Joint Stock Limited Company
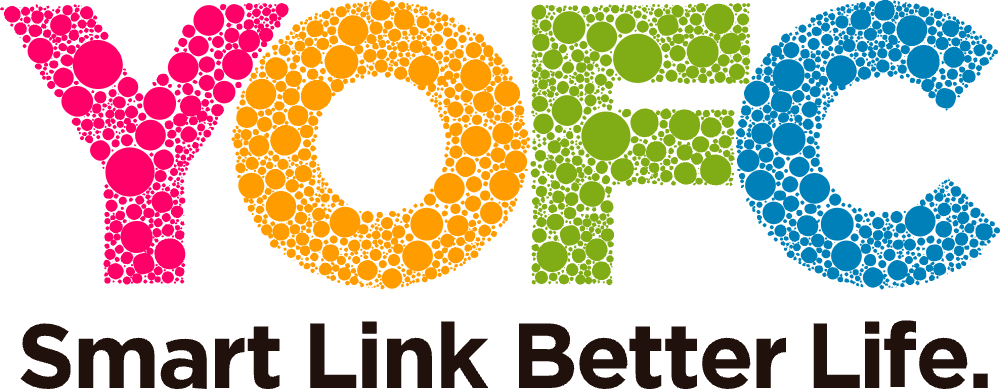
- Trade name: YOFC
- Native name: 长飞光纤光缆股份有限公司
- Type: Public
- Traded as: SEHK: 6869; SSE: 601869
- Industry: Optical fiber
- Founded: May 1988; 38 years ago
- Headquarters: Wuhan, Hubei, China
- Key people: Ma Jie (Chairman); Zhuang Dan (President)
- Revenue: ▼CN¥12.20 billion (2024)
- Net income: ▼CN¥581.25 million (2024)
- Total assets: ▲CN¥22.45 billion (2024)
- Total equity: ▲CN¥11.20 billion (2024)
- Number of employees: 9,616 (2024)
- Website: yofc.com

Yangtze Optical Fibre and Cable Joint Stock Limited Company. (YOFC; Chinese: 长飞光纤; pinyin: Zhǎngfēi Guāngxiān) is a publicly listed Chinese company that engages in the provision optical fiber products.

== History ==
YOFC was established in 1998 as a joint venture between the Ministry of Post and Telecommunications, the Wuhan municipal government, and Philips. In the beginning, all of the manufacturing techniques related to optical fiber were introduced from Philips, and YOFC just made products in accordance with foreign standards as they were unable to change the technical parameters and improve product performance.

In 2000, YOFC established a research and development department. In 2004, YOFC finally solved the technical problem in the optical fiber industry, namely using the Plasma-enhanced chemical vapor deposition process for producing low water peak fibers.

In December 2014, YOFC held its initial public offering becoming a listed company on the Hong Kong Stock Exchange.

In January 2017, YOFC commenced operations of its factory in South Africa. An additional $8.7 million was invested in the factory during 2025.

In July 2018, YOFC held a secondary offering become a listed company on the Shanghai Stock Exchange.

In 2021, YOFC acquired Belden Poliron, a Brazilian cable company that focuses on petrochemical, chemical, and oil industries.

In June 2024, YOFC commenced operations of its $19 million factory in Jalisco, Mexico.
