= Cost to company =

Total salary package of an employee

Cost to company (CTC) is a term for the total salary package of an employee, used in countries such as India and South Africa. It indicates the total amount of expenses a company (organisation) spends on an employee during one year. It is calculated by adding salary to the cost of all additional benefits an employee receives during the service period. If an employee's salary is £50,000 and the company pays an additional £5,000 for their health insurance, the CTC is £55,000. Employees may not directly receive the CTC amount.

== Difference between CTC and pay slips ==
CTC can include many elements in addition to salary/wages, such as healthcare, pension, and allowances for housing, travel and entertainment. Tax is also withheld from the cash amount the employee receives directly. The term CTC is used by companies to more accurately reflect the incremental spend per employee (the concept of direct costs) from the perspective of an organisation. Another way to look at CTC is as all the money that would not need to be spent if the number of employees were reduced by one. Indirect costs such as facilities, support services, and utilities would still be incurred regardless of a headcount reduction of one; thus, CTC does not include any component that cannot be attributed directly to the employee specifically.

A hypothetical breakdown of CTC is given below:

Component of salary	Amount (£)	Taxable amount
Basic salary	240,000	240,000
House rent allowance	60,000	36,000
Conveyance allowance	8,000	0
Entertainment allowance	6,000	6,000
Overtime allowance	6,000	6,000
Medical reimbursements	10,000	0
Gross salary	330,000	288,000
Medical insurance	3,000	
Provident fund (12% of basic salary)	55440	
Total benefit	58440	
CTC = gross salary + benefit	446,880	

Break up of take home salary:

Deductions/take home salary	Amount
Tax (10% of taxable amount)	28,800
Employee provident fund (12% of basic salary)	28,800
Professional tax	2,500
Total deduction	60,100
Gross salary	330,000
Net salary (gross - deduction)	269,900
Monthly take home salary	22,491

If a company provides an annual performance-based variable payout (also known as a bonus or commission), this will also be included in the CTC. The variable payout is usually a certain percentage of the gross salary and typically varies from 5% to 30%. Since it is performance-based, the employee may be eligible for anywhere from 50% to 150% of their variable payout, depending on their performance for the year.

In India, the CTC is usually expressed as LPA (lakhs per annum). Other terms in common use are CCTC (current CTC) and ECTC (expected CTC). A common ratio used by many recruiters is the CTC to total experience. For example, a person with 4 years of experience earning 6 LPA has a ratio of 6:4 = 1.5

== See also ==
- Employment
