= La Mercy =

- Suburb
- Location within KwaZulu-Natal Location within South Africa
- Coordinates: 29°38′S 31°08′E
- Country: South Africa
- Province: KwaZulu-Natal
- Municipality: eThekwini

Government

Area
  - Total: 27.73 km^{2} (10.71 sq mi)

Population (2011)
  - Total: 2,779
  - Density: 100.2/km^{2} (259.6/sq mi)

Racial makeup (2011)
  - Black African: 41.6%
  - Coloured: 1.8%
  - Indian/Asian: 48.2%
  - White: 7.4%
  - Other: 0.9%

First languages (2011)
  - English: 57.0%
  - Zulu: 23.2%
  - Xhosa: 12.8%
  - Afrikaans: 2.4%
  - Other: 4.5%
- Time zone: UTC+2 (SAST)
- Postal code (street): 4399
- PO box: 4405

La Mercy is a coastal suburb of the eThekwini Metropolitan Municipality, approximately 27 km (17 mi) north of Durban, South Africa. It is the location of Durban's King Shaka International Airport. It has four distinct areas - The airport precinct, the main residential area, a shanty town, and a beach-front strip of apartments along South Beach Road.
