= Dube TradePort =

Dube TradePort Corporation
- Trade name: Dube TradePort
- Founded: 2003
- Headquarters: Dube City, La Mercy, KwaZulu Natal, South Africa
- Key people: Bridgette Gasa-Toboti (Chairperson); Mr Hamish Erskine (CEO)
- Services: Logistics
- Revenue: R 588.294 Million (2023)
- Operating income: R 138.168 Million (2023)
- Net income: R 137.427 Million (2023)
- Total assets: R 5.388 Billion (2023)
- Total equity: R 188 Million (2023)
- Number of employees: 206 (2023)
- Parent: KwaZulu-Natal Provincial Government
- Website: DubeTradePort

Dube Tradeport Corporation is a business entity of the KwaZulu-Natal Provincial government in South Africa that manages a 3,000ha infrastructure project called the Dube Tradeport Special Economic Zone set up to promote local and international trade. Located at the King Shaka International Airport, it is situated 30 minutes from Durban Harbour, 90 minutes from the Richards Bay Harbour, and has an international airport, a cargo terminal, warehousing, offices and an agricultural zone.

== History ==
The Dube Tradeport Corporation is named after John Langalibalele Dube, who was an educator, clergyman, writer, newspaper editor and the founding president of the then South African Native National Congress, later the ANC. In 2002, the South African government decided to invest in a new international airport outside Durban. The following year saw the creation of the Dube Tradeport Company by the KwaZulu-Natal Provincial Government to develop a world-class aviation export facility. 2005 saw the beginnings of a development master plan for the Dube Tradeport at the proposed airport. In 2007, the iLembe Consortium were appointed to construct Dube Tradeport and the King Shaka International Airport. In 2010, the Dube Cargo Terminal and King Shaka International Airport opened on schedule with the Dube Trade House opening later in the year. The air-bridge from the cargo terminal opened in 2011 with the first produce at the AgriZone harvested and the corporation moved into its new headquarters onsite.

== Governance ==
The Dube Tradeport Corporation is managed by the Board Chairperson Bridgette Gasa-Toboti and its daily operations are managed by Chief Executive Officer Hamish Erskine. Erskine had been in the acting role from February 2015 and was officially appointed as CEO in September 2016. The previous CEO, Saxen van Coller, had been fired in June 2015 when she failed to disclose previous criminal offences.

== Organisation ==
The Dube TradePort Corporation's business is divided amongst a number of entities:

- King Shaka International Airport
- Dube Cargo Terminal
- Dube Tradezone 1 And 2
- Dube City
- Dube Agrizone
- Dube Iconnect

=== Dube Cargo Terminal ===
The cargo terminal currently has a capacity to handle 100,000 tons of cargo a year and has the capacity to increase to two million tons in the future. Located next to King Shaka International Airport there is direct airside access to the cargo terminal. It is open 24 hours as is the on-site regulatory services such as customs. The cargo terminal connects Dube Trade Zones via overhead conveyor air-bridge allowing freight-forwarding community, logistics service providers, assemblers, distributors and manufacturers to based in that zone. The facility also boasts 1 500 m2 of open cold storage area and specialised temperature controlled storage. The cargo terminal has five main operators, Emirates Sky Cargo, SAA Cargo, Bid Air Cargo, SA Airlink and Africa Charter Airline. It also operates Dube AiRoad, that operates air-to-road and road-to-air cargo to clients in South and Southern Africa.

=== Dube TradeZone 1 And 2 ===
The located inside the zone is the Dube TradeHouse housing freight forwarders and shippers connected by an overhead conveyor air-bridge via the Dube Cargo Terminal. Dube TradeZone 1 consists of 26ha and when TradeZone 2 opened in 2015 the area will increase by 51ha. Some of the tenants include Samsung Electronics, Rossi SA, Pilosio SA, Tufbag, Yangtze Optical Fibre and Cable and Amsted Reelin. Dube TradeZone 3 is set aside for future development with 135ha available for development. TradeZone 4 and TradeZone 5 are also being considered for future developments. Some of the types of industry the trade port wishes to attract are one that use air cargo and includes light manufacturing, assembling, high-tech industries, automotive industries, clothing and textiles, cold storage, pharmaceutical and electronic manufacturing.

The establishment of R150 million condom manufacturing facility was announced at the Dube Tradeport on 19 July 2016. In a partnership between US-based HBM Group and SA Health, the new facility would have the capacity to produce 700 000 condoms per day for the local and export markets with 145 jobs created. October 2016 saw the announcement of the construction of a biopharmaceutical plant costing R1.3 billion at the Dube Tradeport. Signed in Goa, India between Cipla BioTec and the South African government, it will see a manufacturing plant producing biosimilars of affordable medicines for cancer and autoimmune diseases, to be sold in Africa and the world. It will be fully operational in 2018 with between 300 and 480 jobs created.

=== Dube City ===
This area of 12ha, with a future capacity of 24ha, contains office, retail and hospitality space for the zone. It is also home to the Dube Tradeport Corporation's headquarters called 29°South. The city comprises eight blocks and consists of forty five individual serviced stands.

=== Dube AgriZone ===
The facilities here provide for technical support for propagating, growing, packing and distributing perishables and horticultural products for export and also has the Dube AgriLab, a micro-propagation facility of high quality disease-free plants through sterile tissue culture. It has the capacity to produce three million small plants in its 5,300 m2 plant.

=== Dube iConnect ===
This entity supplies a dedicated IT and telecommunication network to the Tradeport and the external companies operating in the zone and offers a cloud service, regional data storage and disaster recovery.
