= Global Airways (GBL) =

South African airline

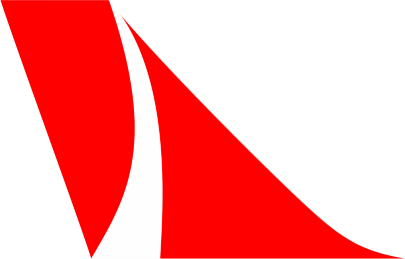
IATA	ICAO	Call sign
GE	GBB; GBL	GLOBE; LITGLOBE
- Founded: 2001; 25 years ago
- Hubs: O. R. Tambo International Airport
- Subsidiaries: LIFT
- Fleet size: 9
- Headquarters: Johannesburg, South Africa
- Key people: Quentin Tomaselli (CEO)
- Website: www.g-airways.com

Global Aviation Operations (Pty) Ltd is a South African airline headquartered in Johannesburg and based at OR Tambo International Airport.

== History ==
Established in 2001 as Global Aviation Operations, the company created a "trading as" entity, Global Airways, to more properly reflect the nature of the business. The main business of Global Airways is the wet leasing (ACMI) of and operating of aircraft. Global Airways' main strategy is to offer fully crewed, maintained and insured aircraft (ACMI) to established airlines.

Global Airways’ aircraft are available for ACMI Leases, Ad hoc, and Charter. The prime focus being on wet lease ACMI contracts and retaining Operational Control thus maintaining Global Airway's high operational standards in the most cost-effective manner. The aircraft are also available on damp lease options subject to Global Airways’ operational and safety standards being met.

The Group's Aviation support services can provide an airline or client with aircraft, flight crew, cabin crew, base support staff, qualified flight dispatchers, aircraft maintenance and operational control. Additionally, Global Airways can train the foreign cabin crew of the client to the level of their crew. Global Airways believes in making partnerships with their clients to benefit both businesses to the fullest.

Historically Global Airways was a McDonnell Douglas fleet operator, which included narrow-body DC-9 and MD-82, and wide-body DC-10 types. These aircraft were phased out between 2010 and 2017, as the company's fleet renewal strategy was to introduce Airbus A320 and A340 aircraft into the operation.

The company has held EASA TCO approval (EASA Third Country Operator – ZAF-0013) since 2016 and continues to operate and maintain aircraft in full compliance with EASA standards, allowing them to operate freely within all EU territories.

Challenges experienced in the aviation industry caused by COVID-19 presented an opportunity for Global Airways to re-think the way airlines are structured and to gain access to infrastructure and talented‚ specialized people. The industry underwent a fundamental change and new business models emerged in the industry where stronger customer orientation and more competition evolved. With this in mind, Global Airways, trading under the name of LIFT, began domestic operations between Johannesburg and Cape Town and George in early December 2020 for the Southern Hemisphere summer season.

== Fleet ==
=== Current fleet ===
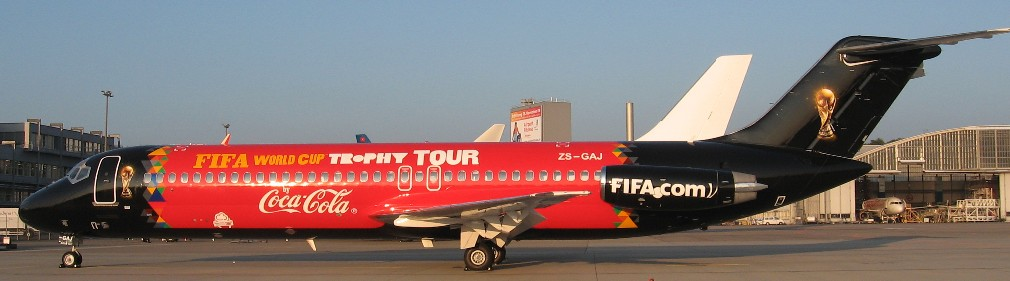
Global Aviation McDonnell Douglas DC-9-32 in special FIFA World Cup livery in 2009

As of August 2025, Global Aviation operates the following aircraft:

Aircraft	In service	Orders	Passengers			Notes	Refs
Aircraft	In service	Orders	C	Y	Total	Notes	Refs
Airbus A320-200	6		12	150	162		
Airbus A320-200	2			180	180		
Airbus A340-500	1	—		356	356	Stored	
Total	9						

=== Former fleet ===
The airline previously operated the following aircraft:

Aircraft	Total	Introduced	Retired	Notes
Airbus A340-500	2			
Douglas DC-9-30	15	2003	2018	
McDonnell Douglas DC-10-10	3	2006	2008	
McDonnell Douglas DC-10-30F	1	2012	2013	
McDonnell Douglas MD-82	2	2009	2017	
