= Global Aviation =

Mauritanian airline

IATA	ICAO	Call sign
—	MSS	Globe Master
- Founded: 2015; 11 years ago
- Fleet size: 7
- Headquarters: Nouakchott, Mauritania
- Key people: Yacoub Sidya (CEO)
- Website: flyglobalaviation.com

Global Aviation is a Mauritanian private airline founded in 2015. It operates charter flights, air ambulance services, cargo transport (including precious metals and hazardous materials), aircraft maintenance, and technical training.

Based in Nouakchott, the company operates throughout West Africa and is involved in flight operations, maintenance, crew provision, and certain aspects of operational engineering. Its activities span segments ranging from passenger charters to cargo and air ambulance services.

== History ==
The company was founded in 2015 by Yacoub Sidya, a Mauritanian businessman previously active in the fields of security, logistics, and natural resources. His entry into the aviation sector was prompted by an accident that occurred in 2012 during a mining-related transport operation, which Sidya has cited as the reason he decided to build an integrated aviation structure.

The first Global Aviation flights began in 2019, initially focusing on medical evacuations between Africa and Europe. The COVID-19 pandemic coincided with an increase in the company's medical evacuation operations.

In December 2019, the company obtained its first authorization to operate in Burkina Faso.

In October 2024, the company obtained the Basic Aviation Risk Standard (BARS) certification.

In 2026, the airline entered the Senegalese market. On January 30, 2026, it launched its first flight between Dakar and Kédougou. By mid-March 2026, it had already completed about ten regular flights with a local team of pilots, mechanics, and administrative staff. The Dakar office is headed by Contant Vitous.

== Services ==
Its operations focus on charter flights, personnel transport for the mining and oil sectors, medical evacuations, the transport of precious metals and hazardous materials, and certain logistics operations in remote areas.

Global Aviation has offices in the subregion and holds air operator certificates and operating permits in several West African countries: Burkina Faso, Mauritania, Mali, Guinea, Niger, Cape Verde and Senegal. The company is authorized to operate in Europe.

== Business model ==
Global Aviation operates under an integrated operator model, focusing on contracts with industrial, institutional, or public-sector clients rather than on ticket sales. The company brings together flight operations, maintenance, training, and part of its operational support under a single structure.

The company sometimes operates on behalf of African national airlines. In this arrangement, the national operator retains its commercial identity, flag, and traffic rights, while Global Aviation provides the fleet, crews, maintenance, and operational engineering.

== Fleet ==
=== Current fleet ===
As of July 2026, Global Aviation (Mauritania) operates the following aircraft:

Aircraft	In service	Orders	Notes
ATR 72-500	1	—	
Beechcraft 1900C	1	—	
Beechcraft 1900D	5	—	
Total	7	—	

=== Former fleet ===
The airline previously operated the following aircraft:

- ATR 72-500s for regional passenger and cargo operations
- Beechcraft 1900C and 1900D for regional transport
- AgustaWestland 109E and 139 for helicopter operations
- Learjet 45 for medical evacuations and long-distance missions

== Company organization ==
=== Human resources ===
Global Aviation is developing a policy to train and build local skills in technical and operational aviation roles. The company funds training programs for pilots and technicians, including programs conducted abroad, particularly in South Africa. This strategy aims to increase the proportion of Mauritanian and West African staff in a sector historically reliant on expatriates.

The company has a policy of internal training and gradual access to highly technical roles. Some Mauritanian employees who joined the company in cleaning crews completed internal training programs and were promoted to assistant mechanic positions.

=== Leadership ===
Born in Nouakchott in 1978, Sidya studied business administration at Northern Kentucky University and subsequently founded companies operating in security, logistics and natural resources before establishing Global Aviation in 2015.

In 2025, Sidya received the African Business Leadership Excellence Award at the ALM AfricaSummit in London. He has also been included in a Financial Afrik ranking of African business leaders.
