= King Shaka International Airport =

Airport serving Durban, South Africa

King Shaka International Airport Koning Shaka Internasionale Lughawe (Afrikaans)

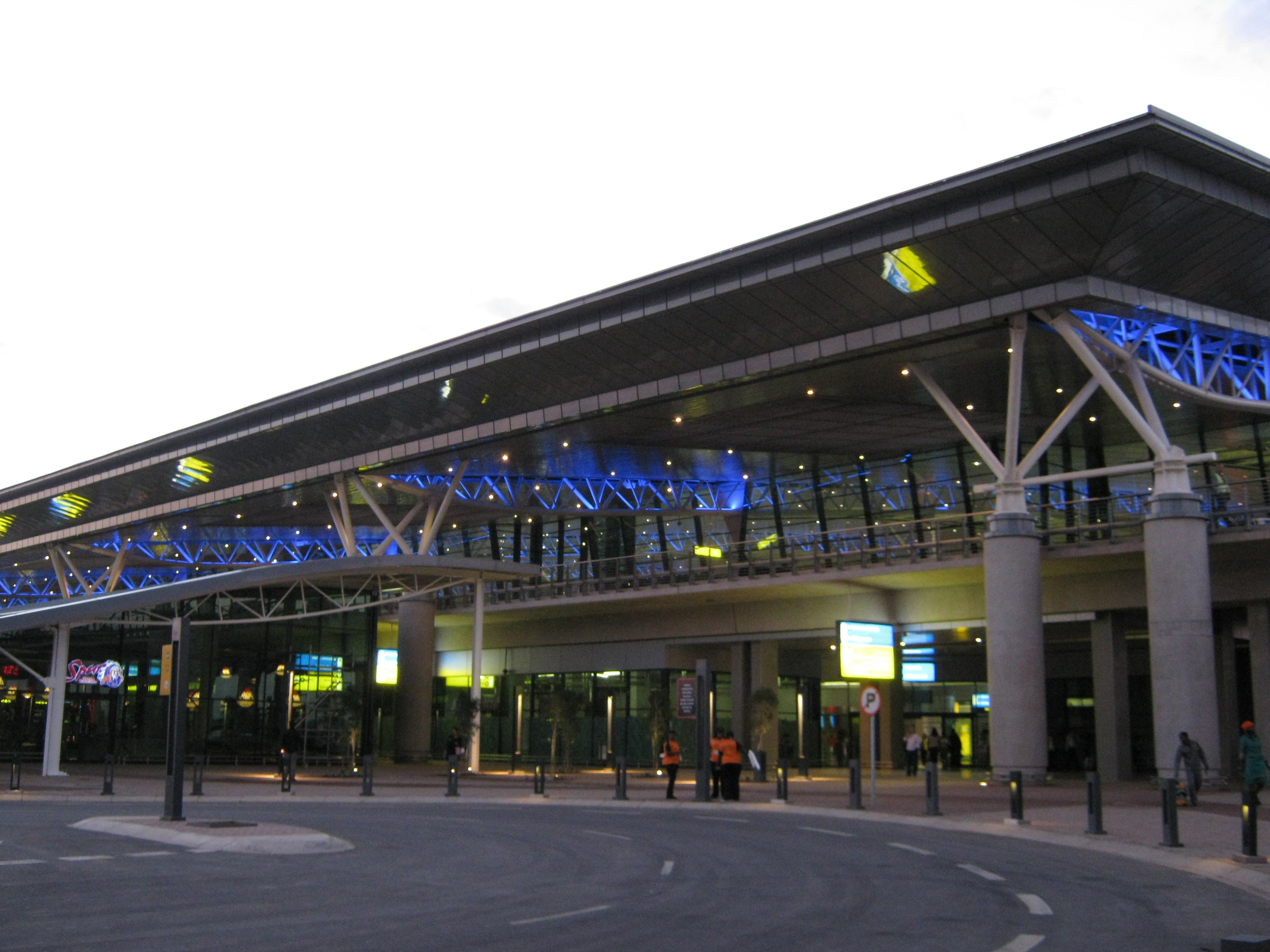
- King Shaka International Airport in 2010
- IATA: DUR; ICAO: FALE

Summary
- Airport type: Public
- Owner/Operator: Dube Tradeport Corporation (cargo terminal); Airports Company South Africa (passenger terminal)
- Serves: Durban, South Africa
- Location: La Mercy, KwaZulu-Natal, South Africa
- Opened: 1 May 2010; 16 years ago
- Hub for: Airlink
- Focus city for: FlySafair
- Elevation AMSL: 93 m (305 ft)
- Coordinates: 29°37.0′S 031°6.5′E
- Website: www.airports.co.za/airports/king-shaka-international-airport

Maps
- Interactive Map
- Location in the Durban metropolitan area DUR (KwaZulu-Natal) DUR (South Africa) DUR (Africa)

Runways
Direction	Length		Surface
Direction	m	ft	Surface
06/24	3,700	12,139	Asphalt

Statistics (FY 2025–26)
- Passenger traffic: 5,616,199
- Aircraft movements: 45,144
- Source: Airports Company South Africa

King Shaka International Airport (IATA: DUR, ICAO: FALE), abbreviated KSIA, is the primary international airport serving Durban, South Africa. It is located in La Mercy, KwaZulu-Natal, approximately 35 km (22 mi) north of the city centre of Durban. The airport opened its doors to passengers on 1 May 2010, 41 days before the start of the 2010 FIFA World Cup. It replaced Durban International Airport (ICAO: FADN) and uses the same IATA airport code. The airport was designed by Osmond Lange Architects and Planners and cost R 6,800,000,000 (about US$900 million).

Although the larger airport was built to grow the area's international services, it is also a key airport for domestic services throughout South Africa, serving the "Golden Triangle" between Cape Town International Airport, O. R. Tambo International Airport in Johannesburg, and KSIA itself with seven passenger and two cargo airlines offering domestic air services.

The airport forms part of the Dube TradePort, which will additionally consist of a trade zone linked to the airport's cargo terminal, facilities to support the airport such as nearby offices and transit accommodations for tourists, an integrated agricultural export zone, and an IT platform.

The largest aircraft KSIA currently has scheduled services for is the Boeing 777-300ER, with Emirates, soon to be replaced by the Airbus A350-900 starting 1 March 2027, operating Dubai–Durban, although KSIA's runway length and terminal can handle the world's largest passenger aircraft, the Airbus A380, and smaller Boeing 747. In September 2015, during the World Routes Conference, which was held in Durban (the first time on African soil), Turkish Airlines announced a new international service to Istanbul and Qatar Airways announced the commencement of service to Doha in December of that year.

On 27 January 2014, an Airbus A380-841 of British Airways landed at KSIA becoming the first A380 to do so. The aircraft was being used for training and operated many flights in and out of the airport until 4 February 2014. The aircraft also returned for further pilot training between 29 August and 1 September of the same year.

== History ==
=== Project conception and initial construction ===
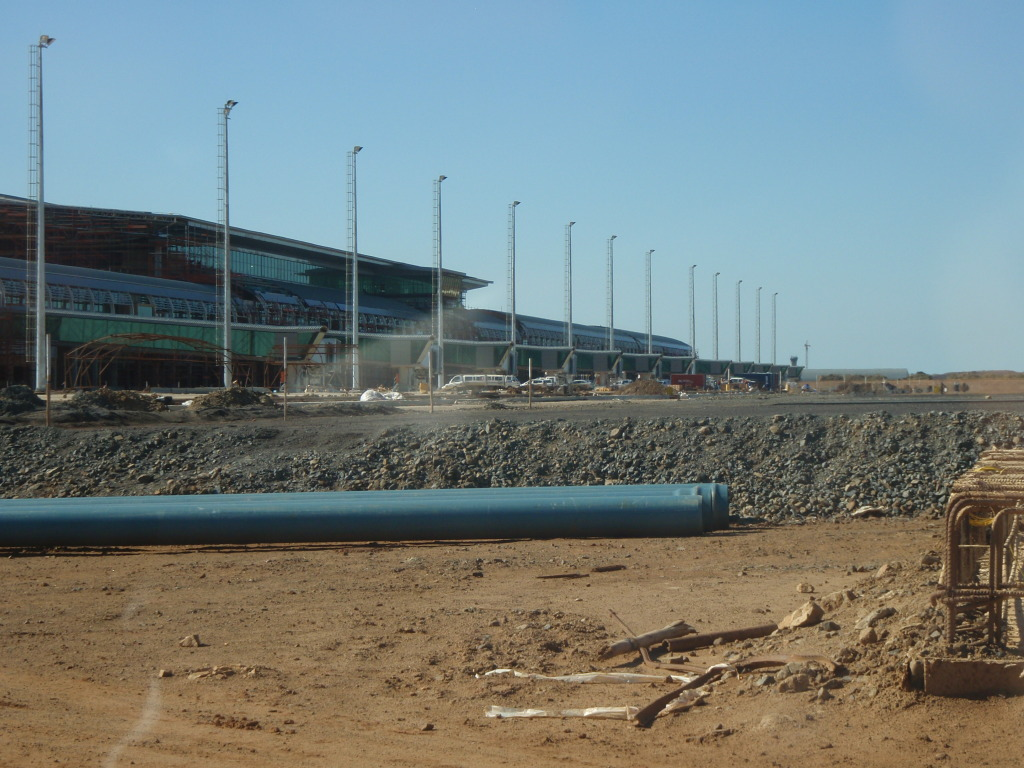
The passenger terminal under construction on 28 August 2009, taken from the air side and showing the domestic airbridges

King Shaka International Airport was conceptualized when the limitations of Durban International Airport became apparent. The airport's 2,400 m (7,874 ft) runway was too short to allow large aircraft such as the Boeing 747 to operate intercontinental routes out of Durban, and the resulting decrease in international air traffic caused Durban to become marginalized compared to Johannesburg and Cape Town. Upgrading Durban International Airport was considered, but a study published in 2007 found that the existing airport would still have serious constraints and would reach its maximum potential by 2025, after which there would be no choice but to develop KSIA. It was also found that it would be 95% more expensive to operate Durban International Airport to its full potential and only then develop KSIA, than it would be to develop KSIA immediately. However, disputes between Airports Company South Africa (ACSA) and the Dube Trade port firm (which is backed by the KwaZulu-Natal (KZN) provincial government) stalled the project until national transport minister Jeff Radebe intervened to jump-start the project in 2004.

The project was then hit by a tender war between the Illembe consortium (led by Group Five and Wilson Bayly Holmes-Ovcon) and the Indiza consortium (led by Grinaker-LTA). Both consortiums pre-qualified for the tender in April 2006; however, the tender was awarded to the Illembe consortium, with the Indiza consortium not being considered for failing to meet certain tender requirements. The Indiza group appealed the decision, claiming that the correct tender process had not been followed and that their bid had been unfairly excluded; However, their legal challenge was dismissed by the Pietermaritzburg High Court in February 2007.

The final obstacle was a delay in the approval of the project's environmental impact assessment (EIA) by the South African Department of Environmental Affairs and Tourism. The EIA was eventually approved in August 2007; conditions attached were the appointment of an environmental control officer, issues of access from the nearby N2 motorway, and fauna and flora issues; in particular, the impact of construction and airport operations on a nearby colony of barn swallows.

Construction of the airport commenced on 24 August 2007, immediately after the approval of the EIA. Construction progressed steadily throughout the next two years, with operational testing of the airport beginning in December 2009. The airport handled its first commercial flights on 1 May 2010. Despite the high construction costs, the airport was designed without a viewing deck or travellators.

It was unclear what the fate of the existing Durban International Airport would be now that the KSIA was complete. It was originally expected that the airport would be decommissioned and the site (in a prime industrial area) would be redeveloped, possibly as a dug-out port serving nearby automotive assembly and component factories; however, such plans have been put on hold. The Durban International Airport eventually became defunct.

British Airways inaugurated a direct link to London's Heathrow Airport in October 2018. It said in December 2020 that it had suspended the service because of the COVID-19 pandemic.

==== Naming process ====
Despite wide expectations that the airport would be named "King Shaka International Airport" (Shaka was the leader of the Zulu nation in the early 19th century), it emerged in October 2009 that the airport needed to undergo a formal naming process. The former premier of KZN, S'bu Ndebele, described the naming process as urgent, stating that "pilots cannot fly to a place with no name". Public hearings on the naming of the airport began at the beginning of November 2009, with most attendees favoring "King Shaka International Airport" as the new airport's name.

On 8 December 2009, it was reported that "King Shaka International Airport" was indeed the most popular name for the new airport. The airport name was approved by the South African Geographical Names Council on 14 January 2010, and became official on 2 February 2010 when the Minister of Arts and Culture gave final approval to the name.

== Future ==
KSIA is currently building two new heavy-class remote gates, which will be named Foxtrot Aprons. Taxiway Bravo is also being extended and will connect to the runway north of the Taxiway Hotel.

As of March 2010, information on future development at KSIA is scarce and conflicting. Long-term master plans published on the Dube Trade Port website show projected phases of development in the future. However, images of future development posted on an internet forum indicate five phases of development, with each phase to be developed based on annual passenger volumes reaching certain levels. Both sources of information agree that the airport would have two parallel runways, with the passenger terminal building having an estimated capacity of 45 million passengers per year in the future.

== Location ==
The airport is located in La Mercy, KwaZulu-Natal, approximately 35 km (22 mi) north of Durban. The airport precinct is bordered by the M43 road to the north, the Mdloti River to the south, the R102 road to the west, and the N2 freeway to the east.

Neighboring communities are Cotton lands and the LIV village at Hazelmere Dam Wall to the west, oThongathi to the northwest, Verulam to the southwest, and eMdloti to the southeast. Notable communities further away are uMhlanga to the south and Ballito to the north. These communities are generally opposed to the airport because of noise concerns, recommendations for mitigation of which were made in the project's Environmental Impact Report.

=== Mount Moreland barn swallows ===
Mount Moreland, a small community located 2.6 km (1.6 mi) south of the airport, is an important roosting site for the European barn swallow. The roughly 250 m^{2} (299 sq yd) reed bed where the birds roost is directly underneath the approach path to runway 06. When the construction of the airport was announced, there were fears that the reed bed would have to be destroyed due to the perceived threat of bird strikes, creating concern amongst environmentalists.

As a result, a study into the risks of bird strikes at KSIA was commissioned, with special attention being paid to the barn swallows at Mount Moreland. The study showed that the early morning dispersals of swallows generally happen before any scheduled arrivals or departures (earlier than 06:00), and the late afternoon swarms take place below the airport approach path, with only 5% of the birds protruding up into the path for a very short time (around 10 minutes). It was also noted that larger bird species, flying at higher altitudes, would pose more of a risk to aircraft than swallows, such species already being a risk at Durban International Airport. The study concluded that it would be possible for the airport and swallows to coexist. Proposed risk mitigation measures included curtailing flight movements during the afternoon swarm, setting the glide slope approach to Runway 06 to 3.2 or 3.5 degrees rather than the standard 3 degrees (to stay above the birds), and the installation of a radar system that would monitor bird movements and be integrated into the operational plan of the airport.

In response to the study, ACSA contracted De-Tect Inc. to install a radar system that would monitor all bird activity around KSIA, notifying air traffic controllers of any dangers to aircraft. The radar system arrived in January 2009 and started collecting data to be used when the airport became operational.

== Terminals ==
=== Passenger terminal ===
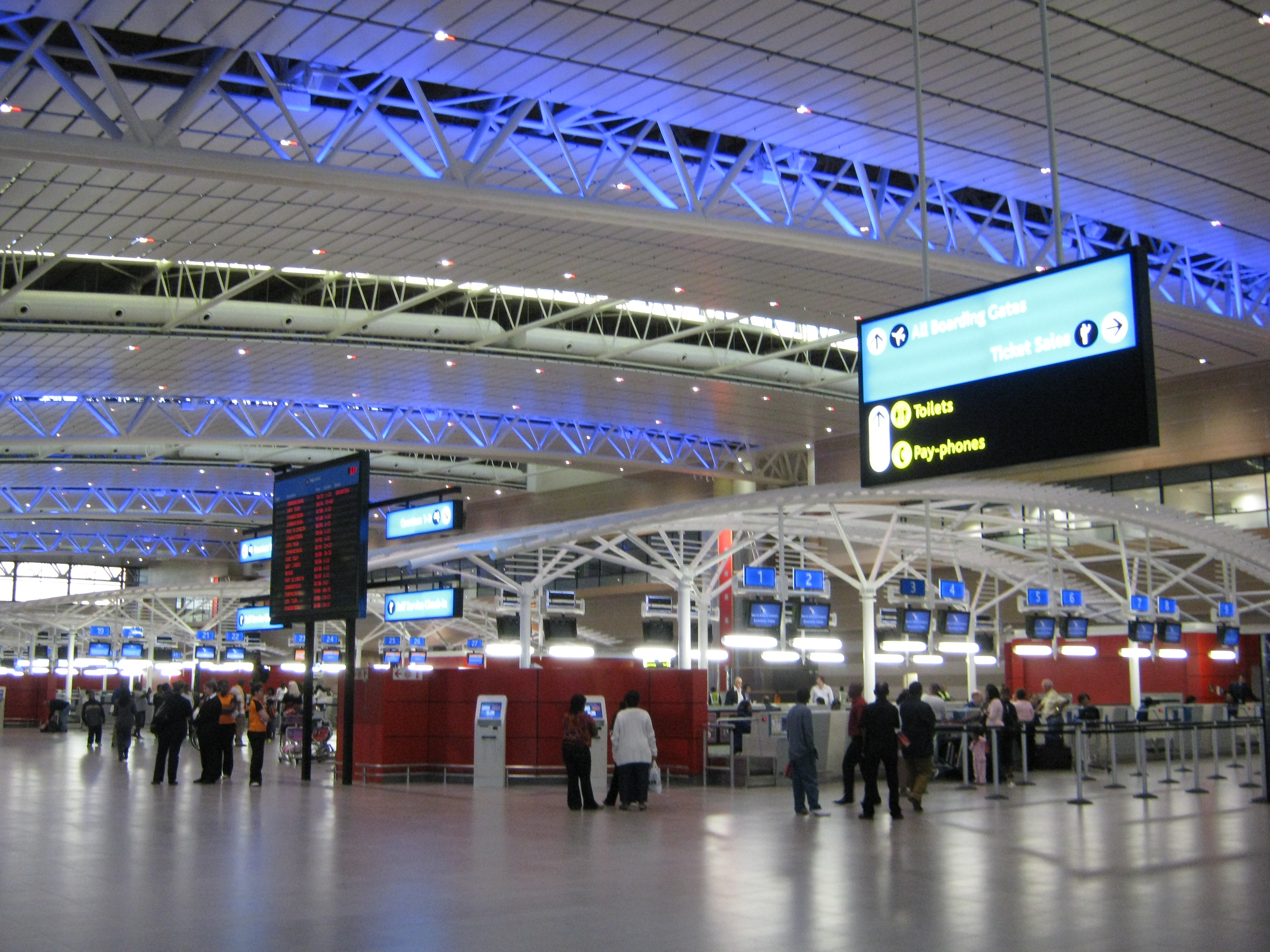
The departures concourse, showing the check-in islands and passengers checking in for their flights. Information is displayed on LED and LCD screens.

The passenger terminal is located at the southern end of the airport and is split into two levels: arrivals are handled on the lower floor and departures on the upper floor. With a total floor area of 102,000 m^{2} (1,100,000 sq ft), the terminal is capable of handling 7.5 million passengers per year.

The check-in concourse, located on the upper floor, contains 72 check-in counters and 18 self-service kiosks, as well as ticket offices for the various airlines operating out of the airport. Passengers pass through separate domestic and international security checkpoints before proceeding to the departure lounges and boarding gates. The airport has 34 aircraft parking bays and 16 jet bridges. Four of the jet bridges (gates A20-A23) can be combined into groups of two to handle Code F aircraft (e.g., an Airbus A380) or can be used separately to handle four Code C aircraft (e.g., an Airbus A320 or Boeing 737). The remainder are capable of handling one Code C aircraft each.

The arrivals area is located on the lower floor, with a baggage reclaim hall containing five conveyors that can be allocated for domestic and international use. Most of the airport's retail shops are also located on the lower floor, as is a piazza area immediately outside the terminal building. Including shops in the departure lounges, the airport has 52 retail outlets and 6,500 m^{2} (70,000 sq ft) of retail space.

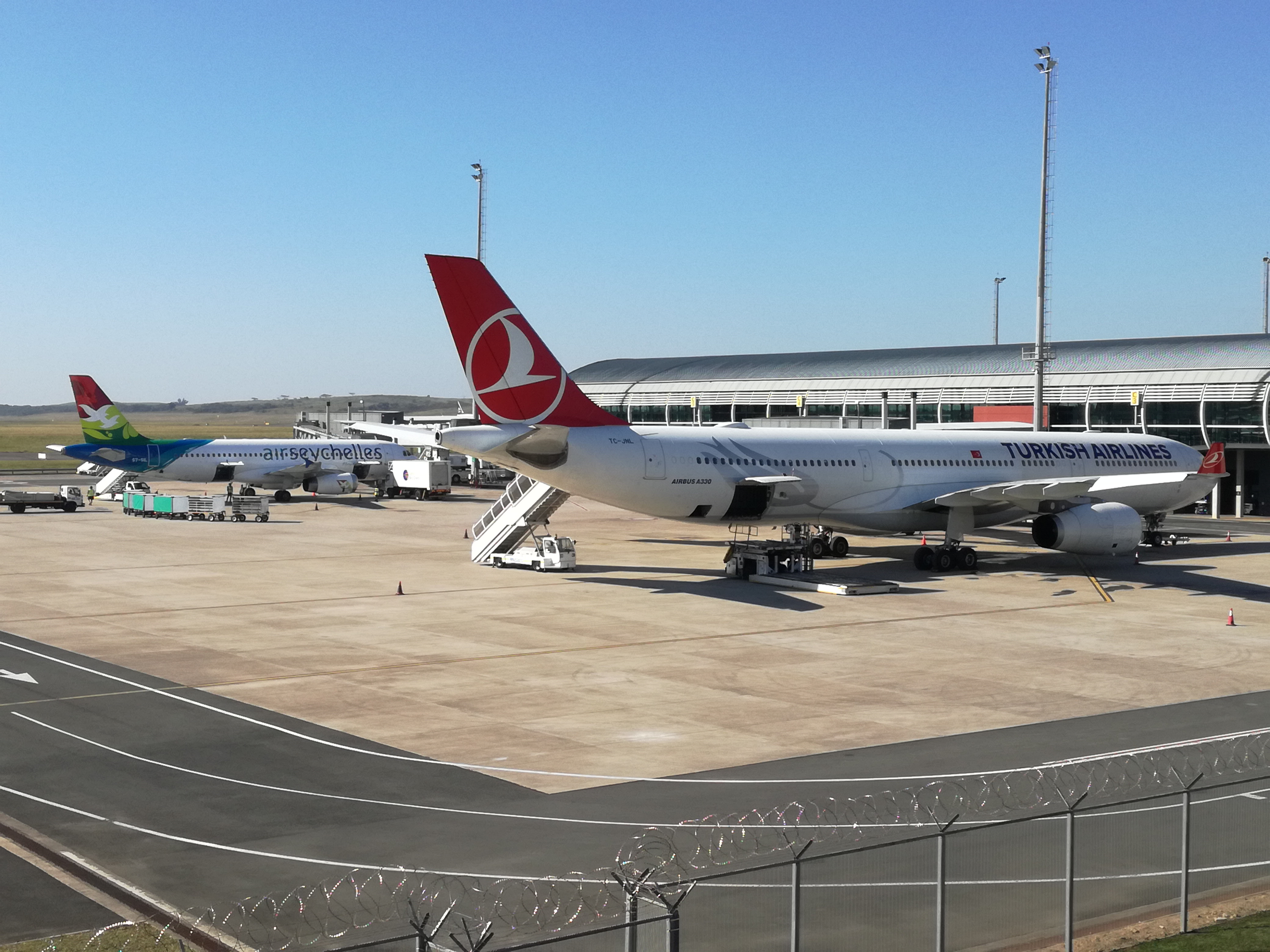
Air Seychelles A320-200 & Turkish Airlines A330-300 at DUR, June 2017

The terminal does not have a public viewing deck, which has attracted public criticism. There are, however, vantage points on the elevated departures drop-off-road, as well as elsewhere in the airport precinct. The International Terminal is located to the left of the airport and has two A380-800 docking bays in which four A320 family aircraft can be parked.

=== Cargo terminal ===
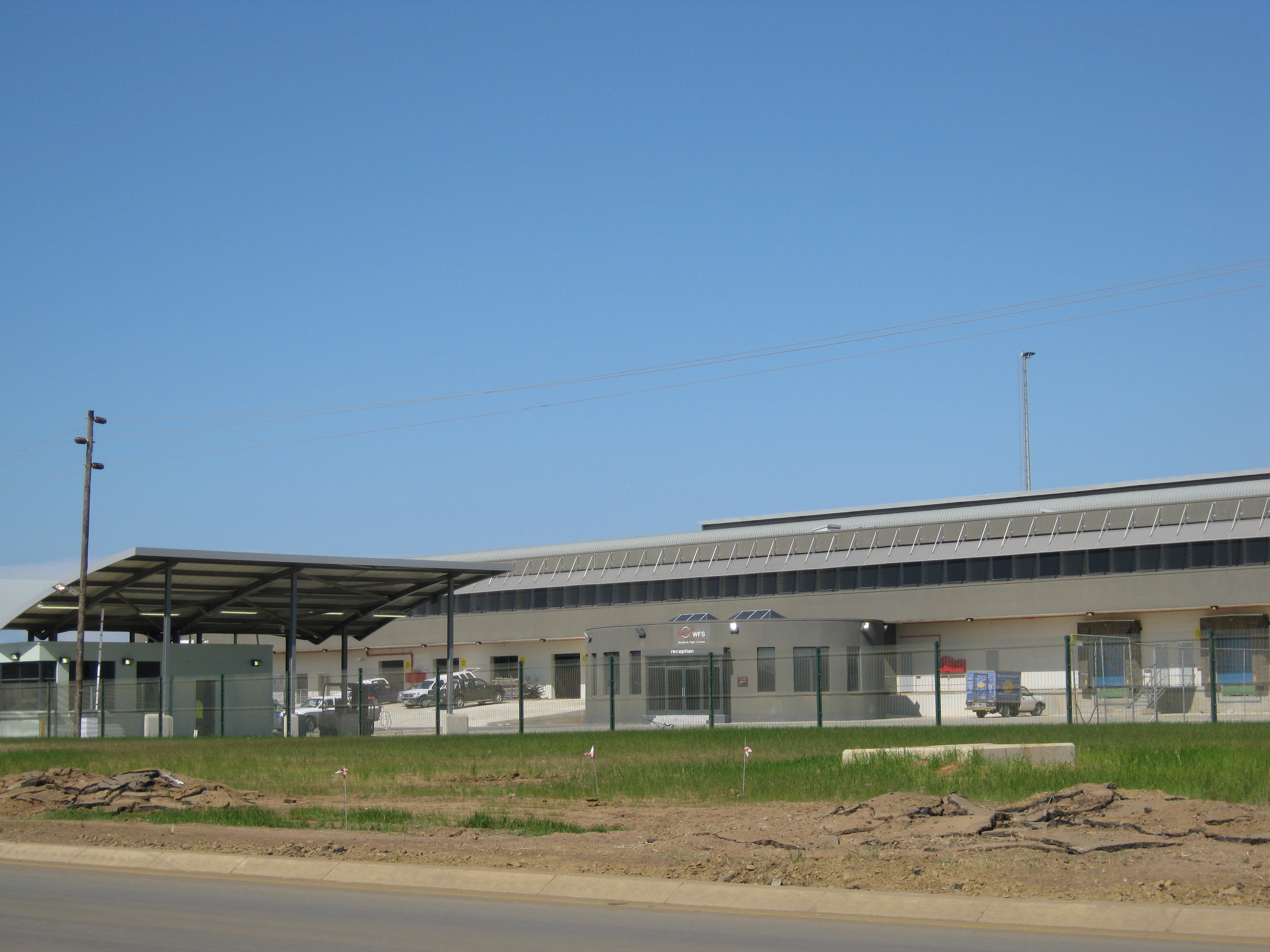
A view of the cargo terminal from the main access road leading to it, showing bays for goods vehicles and the reception area.

The cargo terminal is located to the north of the passenger terminal and is in the approximate centre of the airport precinct. The cargo terminal has an initial size of 15,000 m^{2} (160,000 sq ft) and an initial capacity of 150,000 metric tons (165,000 short tons) of cargo per year. A long-term expansion could see the cargo terminal expand to a size of 100,000 m^{2} (1,100,000 sq ft) and a capacity of 1,000,000 metric tons (1,100,000 short tons) of cargo per year. In August 2009, Worldwide Flight Services was given a five-year contract to operate the cargo terminal.

The cargo terminal forms one component of the Dube Trade Port's Trade Zone Precinct, which is, additionally, home to trade and logistics warehousing as well as cargo and light industry activities that require quick access to air cargo services, and covers an area of 36 hectares (89 acres). In February 2013, Shree Property Holdings agreed to build a 60,000 m^{2} (650,000 ft^{2}) facility in the Dube Trade Zone and an additional 15,000 m^{2} (160,000 ft^{2}) facility. Samsung is to build a TV Production Plant at The Dube Trade Port by the end of 2014; the estimated cost over three years will be $20 million, thus increasing the production from 500 000 flat screens to 1 million.

One of the objectives of the cargo terminal is to recapture local air freight traffic from JNB. It is estimated that KwaZulu-Natal produces approximately 25,000 metric tons (27,600 short tons) of air cargo a year, which is currently transported by road to Johannesburg. The airport also has the advantage of sea level operation as opposed to Johannesburg's high altitude and is also near the Port of Durban, the busiest seaport in the Southern Hemisphere. The cargo terminal will initially have two Code F stands (capable of accommodating large aircraft, like the freighter variants of the Boeing 747-8), which can be expanded to ten stands in the long term.

== Airlines and destinations ==
=== Passenger ===
Airlines	Destinations
Airlink	Gqeberha, Harare, Johannesburg–O. R. Tambo, Mbombela,
CemAir	Bloemfontein, Cape Town, George, Gqeberha, Johannesburg–O. R. Tambo,
Emirates	Dubai–International
Eswatini Air	Manzini
Ethiopian Airlines	Addis Ababa (resumes 11 December 2026)
FlySafair	Cape Town, East London, Gqeberha, Johannesburg–Lanseria, Johannesburg–O. R. Tambo
LIFT	Cape Town, Johannesburg–O. R. Tambo
Qatar Airways	Doha^{1}
South African Airways	Johannesburg–O. R. Tambo
Turkish Airlines	Istanbul^{2}

- ^{1}This flight operates via Maputo. However, this carrier does not have rights to transport passengers solely between Durban and Maputo.
- ^{2}This flight operates via Johannesburg. However, this carrier does not have rights to transport passengers solely between Durban and Johannesburg.
King Shaka International Airport (Earth)
Destinations from DUR.

=== Cargo ===
Airlines	Destinations
BidAir Cargo	Johannesburg-Lanseria, Johannesburg–O. R. Tambo

== Statistics ==
King Shaka International Airport is the third busiest airport in South Africa, behind both OR Tambo International Airport in Johannesburg and Cape Town International Airport.

Annual passenger and aircraft statistics
Fiscal year (Apr–Mar)	Aircraft movements	Passenger traffic
2010–11^{1}	54,718(▲3.6%)	4,873,571(▲10.7%)
2011–12	55,194(▲0.9%)	5,040,094(▲3.4%)
2012–13	49,673(▼10.0%)	4,668,467(▼7.0%)
2013–14	49,559(▼0.2%)	4,465,088(▼4.4%)
2014–15	49,355(▼0.4%)	4,524,894(▲1.3%)
2015–16	52,316(▲6.0%)	4,930,155(▲9.0%)
2016–17	55,030(▲5.2%)	5,220,002(▲5.9%)
2017–18	54,066(▼1.8%)	5,624,170(▲7.7%)
2018–19	51,131(▼5.7%)	5,993,161(▲6.6%)
2019–20	50,753(▼0.7%)	6,099,628(▲1.8%)
2020–21	14,650(▼71.1%)	1,502,286(▼75.4%)
2021–22	29,856(▲103.8%)	3,215,925(▲114.1%)
2022–23	37,349(▲25.1%)	4,307,419(▲33.9%)
2023–24	41,116(▲10.0%)	4,994,178(▲15.9%)
2024–25	40,935(▼0.4%)	5,042,922(▲1.0%)
2025–26	45,144(▲10.3%)	5,616,199(▲11.4%)
Source: ACSA

Notes:

- ^{1}Statistics for 2010–2011 include operations at Durban International Airport up to and including 30 April 2010. Comparisons are made with the previous reporting period's statistics at Durban International Airport.

== Ground transport ==
=== Road ===
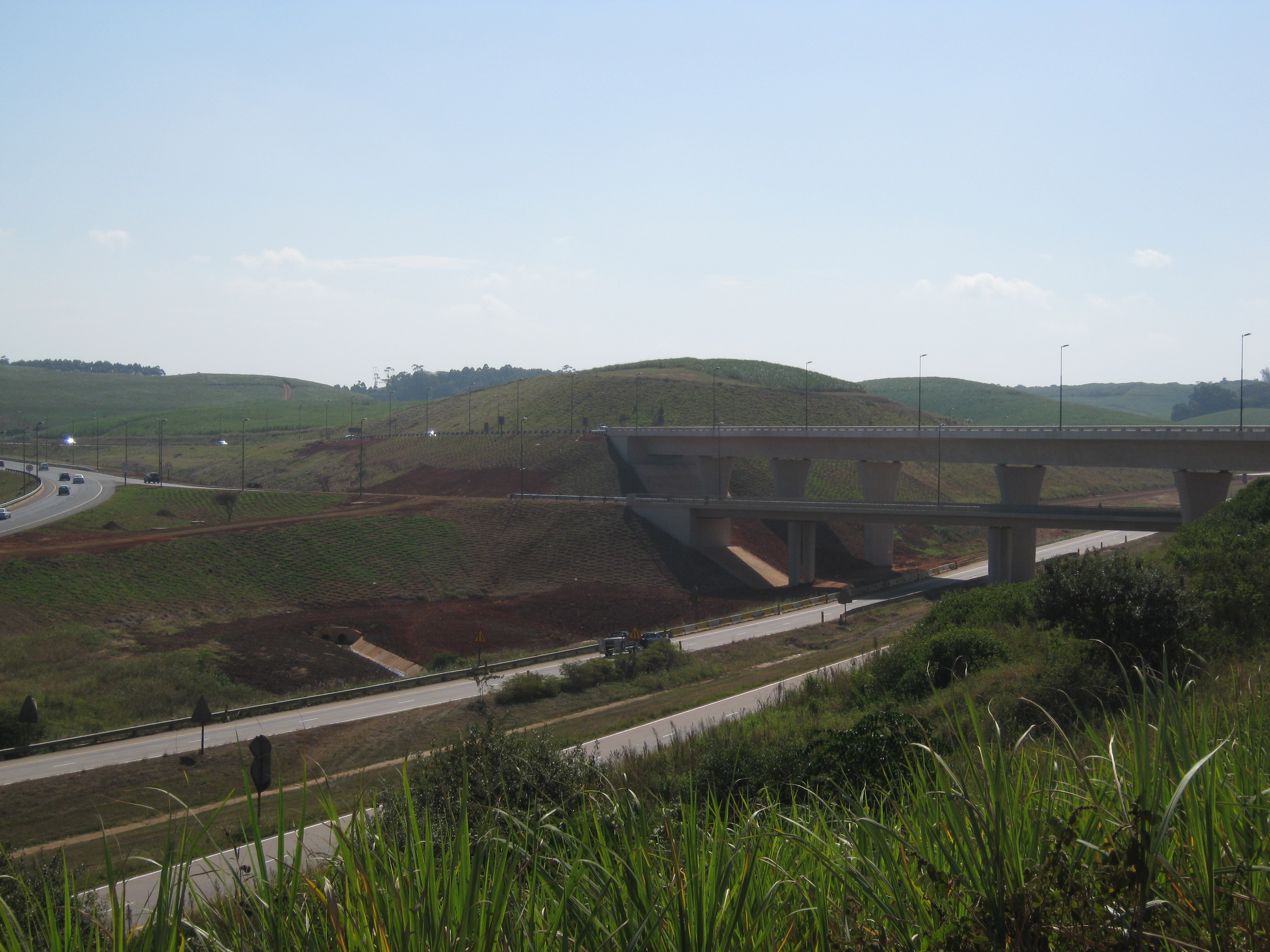
The interchange of the N2 and M65

The airport is accessible from both the N2 freeway and the alternative R102 road, with the M65 linking the N2 at exit 195 and the R102 between Verulam and oThongathi (Tongaat) with the airport. The M65 does not continue from the N2 interchange to the coastal M4 highway, necessitating M4 traffic to divert to the N2 using either the M27 if approaching from the south, or the M43 (Ushukela Drive) if approaching from the north; however, the airport's Environmental Impact Assessment recommended that the M65 should be extended to the M4 in the future should traffic volumes rise to the point where this would become necessary. Another notable road in the vicinity of the airport is the R614 from the Albert Falls and Wartburg areas, which terminates at the R102 in the northern outskirts of oThongathi; users of the R614 access the airport via the R102.

The majority of routes to and from the airport via the N2 involve payment of a toll: traffic leaving the airport to the south (the direction of Durban) must pass through the La Mercy Ramp Plaza located at the interchange of the N2 and M65, while traffic arriving at and leaving the airport from the north (the direction of Ballito/KwaDukuza) must pass through the mainline of oThongathi Toll Plaza located at the interchange of the N2 and M43. Motorists arriving from the south along the N2 are not tolled, and the R102 acts as an untolled alternative route. The N2 S from the airport can lead to the M4 S in uMhlanga, which leads directly into the city.

The airport contains 6,500 public parking bays, both in a short-term parkade and in a shaded medium-term parking area. Public road transport is provided by airport shuttle buses and metered taxis, which have been allocated their own pick-up and drop-off area adjacent to the terminal entrance to the international arrivals area.

=== Rail link ===
The main railway line heading north from Durban along the North Coast runs close to the R102. Direct rail access was provided for in the master plans, and is expected to be constructed after 2010 as part of the second phase of construction. In 2014, talks of a new high-speed monorail between the city and the airport were put forward, with an expected start to construction set for 2017.

In late 2024, it was announced that the eThekwini Metropolitan Municipality was planning a feasibility study for a tram-light rail system between the Durban city centre and the airport, while an exclusive rail link was still under consideration. The tram-light rail system feasibility study was cancelled in June 2025 by the municipality due to no acceptable tenders being received.

== Accidents and incidents ==
- On 13 August 2009, a privately owned Yakovlev Yak-18T (registration ZU-BHR) performed an emergency landing on the then unfinished runway due to a fuel contamination issue, becoming the first aircraft to land at KSIA.
- On 5 August 2012, a 1time Airline McDonnell Douglas MD-83 (registration ZS-OPZ) operating flight T6-653 from Durban to Cape Town International Airport suffered an engine failure to the right-hand engine on the initial climb out of Durban. The crew successfully returned to Durban on the remaining engine with no injuries reported. Debris from the failed engine caused the runway to be closed for 3 hours, resulting in numerous flight delays.
- On 29 August 2016, A Qatar Airways Boeing 787-8, registration A7-BDB performing flight QR-1367 from Doha to Durban via Johannesburg, was on approach to Durban's runway 06 when a bird impacted the nose of the aircraft. The aircraft continued to make a safe landing on the runway. The aircraft remained on the ground for 31 hours.

== Accolades ==
- 2011 – 3rd Best Airport in Africa of the Airport Service Quality Awards by Airports Council International
- 2012 – 2nd Best Airport in Africa of the Airport Service Quality Awards by Airports Council International
- 2013 – 1st Best Airport in World Handling under 5 Million Passengers of the Skytrax World Airports Awards by Skytrax
- 2014 – 1st Best Regional Airport in Africa of the Skytrax World Airports Awards by Skytrax
- 2014 – 2nd Best Airport in World Handling under 5 Million Passengers of the Skytrax World Airports Awards by Skytrax
- 2014 – 3rd Best Domestic Airport in World of the Skytrax World Airports Awards by Skytrax
- 2015 – 1st Best Airport in World Handling under 5 Million Passengers of the Skytrax World Airports Awards by Skytrax
- 2015 – 1st Best Regional Airport in Africa of the Skytrax World Airports Awards
- 2015 – 3rd Best Domestic Airport in World of the Skytrax World Airports Awards
- 2015 – 4th Best Regional Airport in World of the Skytrax World Airports Awards
- 2015 – 2nd Best Airport in Africa of the Airport Service Quality Awards by Airports Council International
- 2016 – 1st Best Regional Airport in Africa of the Skytrax World Airports Awards
- 2016 – 1st Best Airport in World Handling under 5 Million Passengers of the Skytrax World Airports Awards
- 2016 – 2nd Best Airport in Africa of the Airport Service Quality Awards by Airports Council International
- 2017 – 1st Best Regional Airport in Africa of the Skytrax World Airports Awards
- 2017 – 2nd Best Airport in World Handling between 5 & 10 Million Passengers of the Skytrax World Airports Awards
- 2017 – 1st Best Airport Staff in Africa of the Skytrax World Airports Awards
- 2018 – 1st Best Regional Airport in Africa of the Skytrax World Airports Awards
- 2018 – 1st Best Airport in World Handling between 5 & 10 Million Passengers of the Skytrax World Airports Awards
- 2019 – 2nd Best Airport in Africa of the Skytrax World Airports Awards
- 2019 – 1st Best Airport in World Handling between 5 & 10 Million Passengers of the Skytrax World Airports Award
- 2019 – 1st Best Regional Airport in Africa of the Skytrax World Airports Awards
- 2019 – 1st Best Airport Staff in Africa of the Skytrax World Airports Awards
- 2025 – 1st Best Regional Airport in Africa of the Skytrax World Airports Awards
