= Construction industry in South Africa =

Construction by WBHO at the mixed-use Riverlands development in Cape Town, in 2026

The construction industry in South Africa consists of organizations and professionals involved in the construction, alteration, repair, and maintenance of buildings and infrastructure. It includes residential and commercial building construction, civil engineering, industrial construction, site preparation, building installation and completion, and the construction of roads, railways, utilities, and other public infrastructure.

As of 2026, the construction industry is a significant but decreasing component of the South African economy. Construction accounted for 2.3% of national value added in 2025, with an industry value of R99 billion, down from R156 billion in 2016. The industry's total income was R605 billion in 2024, while over 539,000 people were employed in the industry in June 2024.

== History ==
=== Establishment ===
The modern South African construction industry developed alongside the country's urbanisation, industrialisation, mining, and expansion of transport infrastructure. By the 20th century, construction had become an established industry encompassing both building and civil engineering. The sector played a major role in developing roads, railways, ports, public buildings, housing, and other infrastructure required for economic development.

=== Developments ===
Construction activity expanded substantially during the second half of the 20th century, as the government invested in infrastructure, industrial development, housing, and large public works. However, from the early 1980s, apartheid resulted economic issues, and by extension, a significant decline in construction investment.

Following the end of apartheid in 1994, investment in civil engineering and non-residential building increased, as the new democratic government pursued infrastructure development and sought to address substantial infrastructure backlogs.

In 1997, the national government published a white paper on creating an enabling environment for reconstruction, growth, and development in the construction industry. It sought to develop a coherent national strategy for the industry, and recognized construction as an important contributor to infrastructure development, employment, and economic growth.

=== Recent years ===
The industry experienced a period of strong activity during the 2000s, but subsequently entered a prolonged period of decline. Construction's contribution to national value added fell from 4.2% in 2008 to 2.3% in 2025. Factors contributing to the decline include weak economic growth, low investment, electricity shortages, and labor shortages. Some of these issues have since been resolved.

Since the mid-2020s, the government has sought to revive the industry through increased infrastructure investment, improved project preparation, and reforms to public sector construction procurement. In 2025, government and industry stakeholders adopted the National Construction Summit Declaration, which called for measures to improve project delivery, contractor performance, skills development, and digitalization.

In August 2026, the government reported that 82 strategic infrastructure projects worth R502.7 billion were under construction.

== Economic importance ==
The construction industry is an important component of the South African economy, as it provides buildings and infrastructure for households, businesses, industry, and government. Construction activity also supports employment and demand for materials, equipment, professional services, and other industries. In 2024, construction industry income totaled R605 billion and the industry employed just over 539,000 people.

Construction's contribution to South Africa's economy has decreased in recent years. Its share of national value added went from a peak of 4.2% in 2008 to 2.3% in 2025, while the industry's real value declined from R156 billion in 2016 to R99 billion in 2025.

The industry is also closely linked to infrastructure investment. Government infrastructure spending supports construction activity and employment, while construction investment contributes to the development of transport, energy, water, housing, and other infrastructure needed for economic growth.

== Types of construction ==
=== Residential ===
Residential construction includes the development of new houses, apartments, townhouses, and other dwellings, as well as additions, alterations, and maintenance of existing properties. The sector serves both the private housing market and government-supported housing programs, including the construction of subsidized housing and other forms of affordable housing.

A report in 2022 showed that South Africa had a total of 6.7 million residential properties, collectively worth R5.96 trillion. The most valuable area for housing stock is Cape Town. Around 70% of South African residents own the home they live in.

Demand for residential construction is influenced by population growth, household formation, housing affordability, and government housing programs. Census 2022 recorded approximately 17.8 million households nationally, with about 12% to 13% living in informal dwellings. In 2026, approximately 3.4 million households were registered on the National Housing Needs Register for government housing assistance.

In 2025, the value of residential buildings reported as completed increased by 9.0%. Residential property prices vary significantly between cities, and have historically been strongest in Cape Town, especially in the city's Southern Suburbs and Atlantic Seaboard, which have some of the country's most expensive residential real estate.

=== Commercial ===
Commercial construction covers buildings used for business and service activities, including offices, shopping centers, retail premises, hotels, restaurants, and other commercial properties. Construction activity in this segment is closely linked to private investment, business formation, and demand for commercial and retail space.

In 2025, the value of building plans passed for non-residential buildings by larger municipalities declined by 11.6% year-over-year.

Large commercial developments can nevertheless generate substantial construction activity in particular metropolitan and growth areas. Mixed-use developments combine retail, offices, residential buildings, hospitality, and associated infrastructure, while shopping centers, hotels, and business parks remain important components of the commercial construction market.

Commercial property investment and value shifts vary greatly between metropolitan areas in SA. Certain commercial real estate markets are more robust than others. An example is Cape Town, where property prices have increased significantly and consistently in recent years, in contrast to some other major metro areas. This is due to the city being recognized as broadly better maintained and more cohesive politically. Cape Town CBD, a major commercial node, has had numerous large companies relocate their headquarters to it, from other cities. Property development just within the single CBD suburb increased to over R7 billion in 2023.

=== Industrial ===
Industrial construction includes factories, warehouses, processing facilities, logistics centers, mines, and other specialized industrial structures. Major projects can involve substantial civil engineering, mechanical, electrical, and infrastructure works in addition to the construction of buildings.

Industrial and logistics construction is closely associated with manufacturing, mining, trade, and the movement of goods through South Africa's transport network. Special economic zones and industrial development zones have been important locations for new industrial facilities, with projects including factories, warehouses, logistics facilities, and supporting infrastructure. One example is the Atlantis Industrial Area SEZ in the City of Cape Town, which has become a hub for green tech. Another example is the Dube TradePort near Durban, which invested R109.7 million in fixed capital projects during the 2025/26 financial year, including infrastructure works and large-scale industrial warehousing, and has planned two additional industrial warehouses for medium-sized manufacturers.

Industrial construction can also form part of large private-sector investment projects. Recent developments have included manufacturing facilities, distribution centers, cold-storage facilities, and logistics parks, reflecting demand for additional industrial and warehousing capacity along major transport corridors and around ports and airports.

=== Public infrastructure ===
Public infrastructure construction includes roads, bridges, railways, airports, ports, water and sanitation systems, electricity infrastructure, schools, hospitals, and other public facilities. Government infrastructure investment is a major source of construction activity, with projects undertaken by national, provincial, and municipal authorities as well as state-owned entities.

The government's Strategic Integrated Projects (SIPs) form an important part of the national infrastructure pipeline. and cover transport, energy, water, logistics, and other infrastructure. In August 2026, South Africa had 81 SIPs comprising 263 individual projects with an estimated combined value of approximately R1.99 trillion. Of these, 82 projects worth approximately R502.7 billion were under construction, while a further 54 projects worth R206 billion were in documentation and procurement.

Infrastructure construction includes not only the construction of new facilities, but also the maintenance of existing public assets. Roads, railways, water systems, electricity networks, and other municipal infrastructure require ongoing investment to maintain and expand service capacity. The government has increasingly emphasized project preparation and the development of bankable projects to improve the implementation of infrastructure investment.

Different metro areas put varying amounts of effort into maintaining and developing public infrastructure. For example, in recent years, the City of Johannesburg and eThekwini Metropolitan Municipality have received significant negative publicity over a lack of infrastructure spending and projects not completed. Meanwhile, the City of Cape Town had a total infrastructure budget in the 2025/26 financial year of R12.6 billion. Of that, it allocated R12.24 billion – the highest single year city infrastructure investment in South Africa's history.

== Major companies ==
The South African construction industry includes several large listed construction groups as well as major privately-owned contractors. Many of the largest companies operate across multiple construction sectors, including building construction, civil engineering, roads, infrastructure, mining, and other related services. Major local construction companies, in descending order of total annual revenue, include:

Company	HQ	Type	Established	Revenue	Ref.
WBHO	Johannesburg, Gauteng	Public	1970; 56 years ago	▼ R28.3 billion (2026)	
Aveng	Boksburg, Gauteng	Public	1944; 82 years ago	▼ R26.4 billion (2026)	
Raubex	Bloemfontein, Free State	Public	1974; 52 years ago	▲ R22.1 billion (2026)	
Stefanutti Stocks	Johannesburg, Gauteng	Public	1971; 55 years ago	▲ R7.84 billion (2026)	
Concor	Johannesburg, Gauteng	Private	1948; 78 years ago	–	
Power Group	Cape Town, Western Cape	Private	1983; 43 years ago	–	

== Industry associations ==
The South African construction industry is represented by several industry associations covering different parts of the sector. The Master Builders South Africa (MBSA) represents employers and contractors in the building industry and supports its members on matters including labor relations, training, and industry policy. The South African Forum of Civil Engineering Contractors (SAFCEC) represents civil engineering contractors and acts as an employers' organization, providing members with support on labor relations, training, transformation, contractual matters, and economic affairs.

Professional associations also represent specific occupations within the construction and built environment sectors. The Association of South African Quantity Surveyors (ASAQS) represents quantity surveyors and advocates for the profession in industry and government forums, while other professional bodies represent architects, engineers, project managers, and other construction-related professions.

== Regulation ==
The construction industry is regulated through legislation covering matters including building standards, public procurement, contractor registration. The National Building Regulations and Building Standards Act, 1977 establishes national building regulations and standards, and provides for their enforcement by local authorities.

The Construction Industry Development Board (CIDB), established under the Construction Industry Development Board Act, 2000, regulates aspects of the construction industry and maintains the Register of Contractors for public sector construction procurement. Public sector clients are required to use the register when procuring construction work, with contractors graded according to their financial and construction capability.

=== Environmental impact ===
The construction sector is also subject to South Africa's robust environmental legislation, including the following:

- National Environmental Management Act, 1998 (NEMA)
- National Environmental Management: Biodiversity Act, 2004
- National Environmental Management: Protected Areas Act, 2003
- National Heritage Resources Act, 1999

The government has promoted sustainable construction and green building practices to reduce resource consumption and the environmental impacts of the built environment.
