= Nu Metro =

South African cinema company

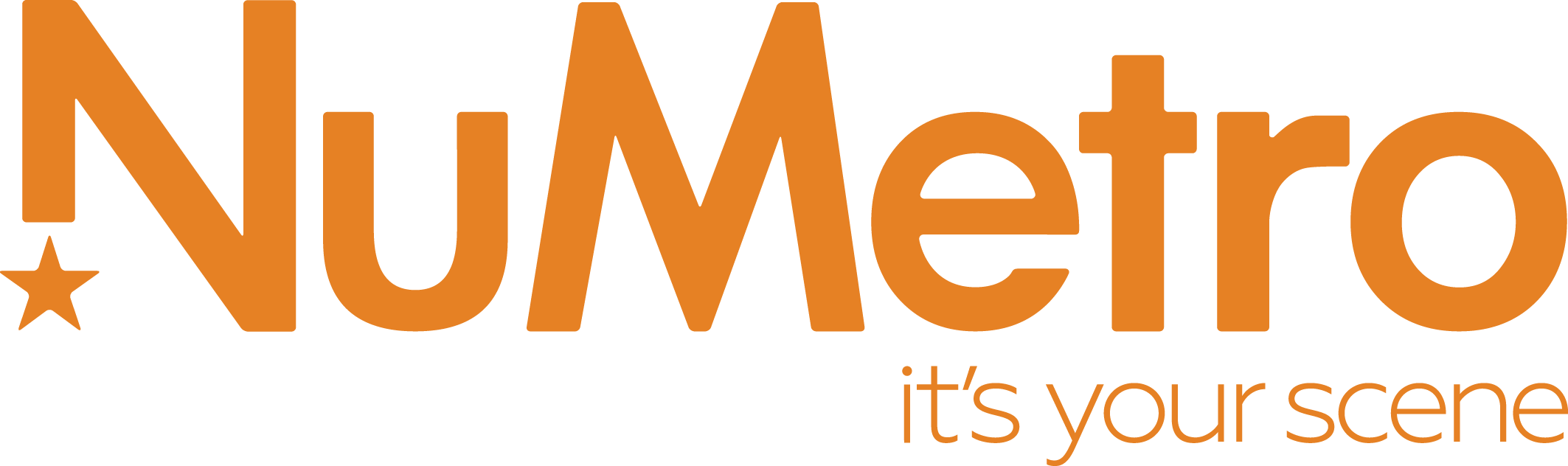
- Type: Private
- Industry: Entertainment
- Founded: 1988
- Headquarters: South Africa, Johannesburg, South Africa
- Number of locations: 18
- Website: numetro.co.za

Nu Metro Cinemas is a South African cinema company. Its head office is in Dunkeld West, Gauteng.

Nu Metro's history dates to when the first Metro Theatre opened in Johannesburg in 1932. The oldest still-operating Nu Metro cineplex is Bedford, which opened in 1972. The company changed its name from Metro Theatres to Nu Metro Theatres in February, 1988, and then to Nu Metro Cinemas in 2008. Ownership of the company has changed hands multiple times over its 80-plus-year history. Most recently, it was owned by the Times Media Group until 31 December 2013, when it, together with wholly owned subsidiary Popcorn Digital Cinema Advertising, were sold to an independent consortium for R75 million.

The first film to feature digital audio at Nu Metro was Jurassic Park, in 1993, which played at Bedford Cinema 2 in DTS. Nu Metro's first DCP-compliant digital screen was Montecasino Cinema 11, which went live in December, 2006, with the animated movie Happy Feet. Night at the Museum was its first live action DCP-compliant digital movie. In 2009, Nu Metro Cinemas opened Africa's first all-digital cinema complex at Emperors Palace in Johannesburg. By 2013, 35 mm film had become obsolete on the circuit, with all cineplexes having been converted to DCP-compliant digital screens.

Late in 2014, Nu Metro opened Scene Xtreme cinemas at The Glen and Menlyn Park. The Scene Xtreme offering is similar to the large screen format offered by IMAX. The concept features 4K digital projection, immersive 11.1-channel sound, and reclining seats.

The company reopened its theatres in August 2020, following their closure as a result of the Covid-19 pandemic.

== Locations ==
Nu Metro has 18 cinemas across South Africa.

These include:

Bedford
Clearwater
The Glen
Hyde Park
Loch Logan
Menlyn Park
The Pavilion
Canal Walk
Mountain Mill
Boardwalk (Gqeberha)
Galleria
Emperors Palace
Woodlands
Ballito Junction
Cornubia
Westgate
Gateway
Cavendish Square

== Experiences ==
Nu Metro currently offers standard 2D/3D screenings, but select locations feature other special experiences:

Scene Xtreme cinemas feature large-format screens which stretch from floor to ceiling along with 3D Dolby audio, leather seating and 4K laser projection.

Scene VIP cinemas feature a VIP lounge, which sports its own snack bar where foods, popcorn, slushies, and alcoholic beverages can be purchased. The experience offers a A Lá Carte menu, where food and drinks can be brought to you while in the cinema. The cinema itself has reclining leather seats, which have an in-built cupholder and stow-able tray table, as well as extra legroom between rows.

4DX cinemas feature moving seats and special effects such as fog, scents, sprays and lighting effects.

Kidz cinemas feature a kids play area, and colourful child-sized seating within the cinema itself. Low-level lighting is kept on during screenings.
