= Ballito Junction Regional Mall =

Regional shopping centre in Ballito, South Africa

- Alternative names: Ballito Junction

General information
- Location: Ballito, KwaZulu-Natal, South Africa, 44 Leonora Drive, Ballito, 4399
- Coordinates: 29.525003°S 31.203172°E
- Opening: 2005
- Renovated: 23 March 2017
- Renovation cost: R1,600,000
- Owner: Flanagan & Gerard Property Group and Menlyn Maine Investment Holdings

Technical details
- Floor count: 3
- Floor area: 80,000 m^{2} (860,000 sq ft)

Renovating team
- Architect: MDS Architecture
- Renovating firm: WBHO

Other information
- Number of stores: 200+ stores

Website
- ballitojunction.co.za

Ballito Junction Regional Mall, commonly known as Ballito Junction, is a regional shopping centre in Ballito on the North Coast of KwaZulu-Natal, South Coast. It is the largest shopping centre in the Dolphin Coast region, which includes Ballito, Salt Rock, KwaDukuza and surrounds. The mall is owned and owner-managed by an investment consortium comprising Flanagan & Gerard Property Group and Menlyn Maine Investment Holdings.

== History ==
Ballito Junction officially opened its doors in 2005 as a 10,000m^{2} neighbourhood convenience centre developed by Ballito Junction Development (Pty) Ltd, a property holding company controlled by ABSA (50%) and Robfair Investments No. 139 CC (50%).

2014 became a major changing point for Ballito Junction as the shopping cente alongside the surrounding 10ha undeveloped prime property was acquired by its current owners, Flanagan & Gerard Property Group and Menlyn Maine Investment Holdings, who planned to transform the neighbourhood shopping centre into a regional shopping centre serving the booming population of the North Coast. On 4 March 2015, the KwaDukuza Local Municipality officially approved the Site Development Plan (SDP) for the 65,000 m^{2} expanded shopping centre (although it launched at 80,000 m^{2}), extending the existing shopping centre by over 55,000 m^{2}.

WBHO, the main contractors, commenced with the construction of the expansion project, which was concluded in the beginning of 2017 and officially opened on 23 March 2017 as an 80,000 m^{2} regional shopping centre. Shortly after its opening in 2017, the mall received the "Retail Design and Development Awards, Category Winner, New Development" award from the South African Council of Shopping Centres (SACSC). The following year in 2018, it received an additional award from the "Award for Innovative Excellence in Property Development, Best Retail Development" from the South African Property Owners Association (SAPOA).

In 2023, Ballito Junction undertook a refurbishment which involved the incorporation of Workshop17's first flexible co-working space in KwaZulu-Natal, adding a "work and play" element to the mall. Another component of the refurbishment was the redevelopment of the older restaurant area into a redesigned and modern restaurant piazza node and the addition of two new international fast-food chains, Starbucks and Krispy Kreme. The refurbishment was completed and unveiled on 30 November 2023, and Workshop17 officially debuted with their new co-working space branch in May 2024.

== Location and accessibility ==
Ballito Junction is situated on the M4 (Ballito Drive), the main road through Ballito, in the new Ballito Commercial Centre and lies less than 500 m from the N2 interchange with Ballito Drive. The mall is mainly accessed from Ballito Drive via the northern entrance at Moffat Drive and the southern entrance at the traffic circle with Leonara Drive.

== Tenants ==
Ballito Junction has over 200 stores, in which eight are considered to be anchor tenants including:

- Checkers
- Clicks
- Dis-Chem
- Edgars
- Game
- Nu Metro
- Pick n Pay
- Woolworths
