= Concor =

South African construction company

Concor Holdings
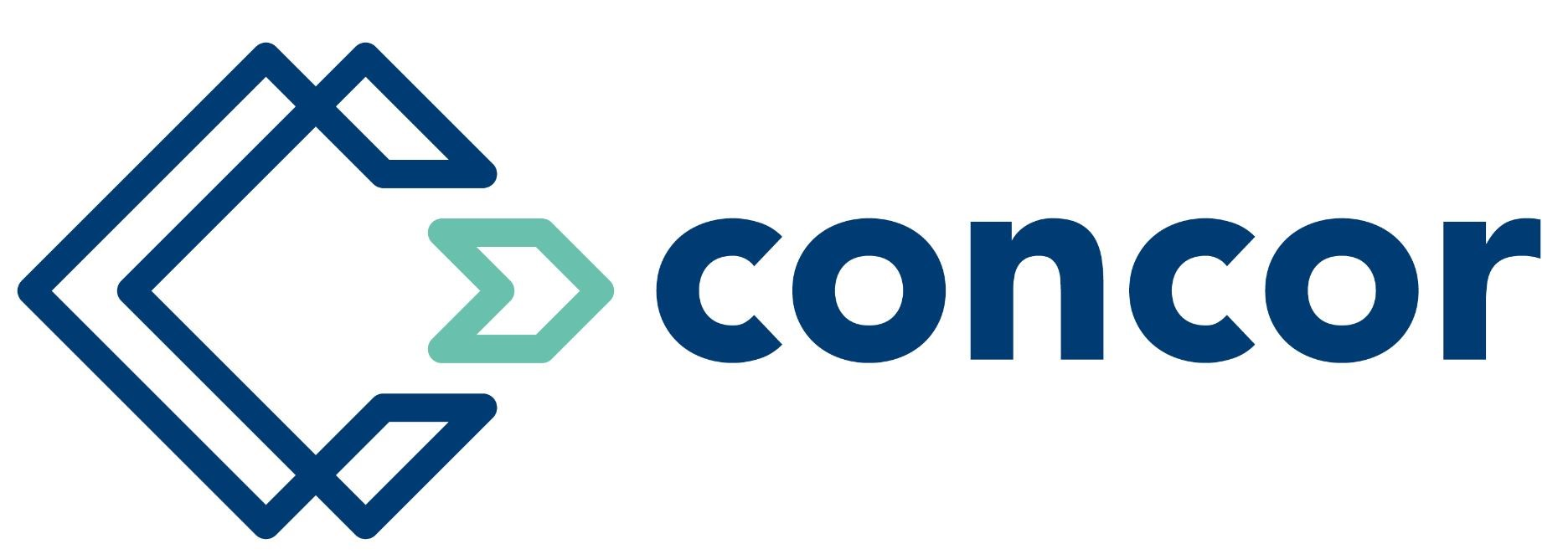
- Formerly: Concor and Murray and Roberts (merger)
- Type: Private
- Industry: Construction
- Founded: 1948; 78 years ago
- Headquarters: Johannesburg, Gauteng, South Africa
- Area served: Southern Africa; United Arab Emirates
- Key people: Marius Koen (CEO)
- Number of employees: 3,400+
- Website: concor.co.za

Concor, officially Concor Holdings Pty Limited, is a South African construction and mining services company. Concor was founded in 1948, is headquartered in Johannesburg, and has civil engineering and mining projects throughout Southern Africa and the UAE.

== History ==
Engineer Fernando Piccinini, the original founder of Construction Corporation, registered the company in Johannesburg on 28 April 1948. The other four founding members were M. Barnabo, B. Chiozzi, U. Mantelli and V. Cini.

The original name Construction Corporation was finally shortened to CONCOR. Eng. Piccinini was originally a chairman of Ferrocemento, an Italian construction giant and the emerging Concor received its technical support initially from there.

The company's first major project was the construction of the Rand Sports Stadium in Johannesburg followed by contracts for the Pretoria and Johannesburg power stations. Another initial project was the Storms River bridge which was designed by Dr. Riccardo Morandi of Rome, this bridge was for many years the highest and longest single span bridge in South Africa.

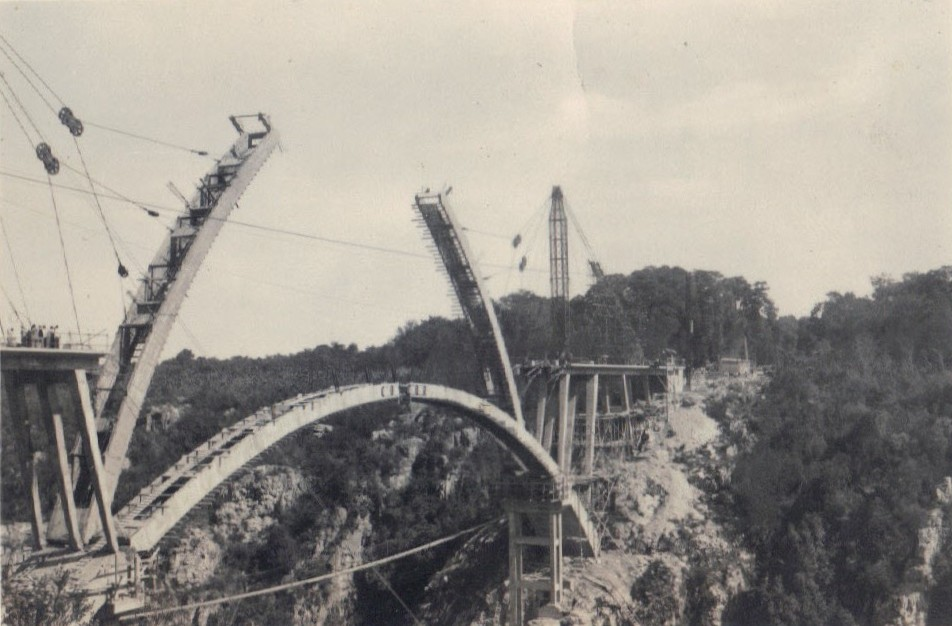
Second pair of concrete semi-arches being lowered into position at the Storms River Bridge constructed between 1953 and 1956

By the early 2000s, Concor consisted of the following divisions; Concor Buildings, Concor Civils, Concor Mining, Concor Engineering, Concor Technicrete, Concor Facility Management, Concor Property Development, and Concor Roads.

By the early 2000s, the German international construction group Hochtief owned just under 50% of Concors shares providing the company with the benefits of technology transfer.

For the year ended June 2005, its last year as a publicly listed company, Concor's annual revenue totaled R1.6 billion. Concor was delisted on 30 June 2006 when 100% of its share capital was purchased by major South African construction company Murray & Roberts. It changed its name when it merged with Murray and Roberts Construction (Pty) Ltd. Whilst under the control of Murray & Roberts, Concor Facility Management and Concor Property Development was closed whilst Concor Roads was merged with Concor Civils. Concor Technicrete was sold as a going concern.

The Concor and Murray and Roberts construction surface mining divisions were sold to a consortium consisting of the PIC and SPG in late 2016 and renamed Concor in May 2017. Concor is now certified a Level 1 BEE Company.

Concor entered voluntary business rescue in October 2026 due to cash flow strain. This was triggered when it lost a High Court bid to block a performance guarantee for a project. Concor absorbed the full liability after a joint venture partner, Murray & Roberts' OptiPower, defaulted. Despite these pressures, the BRPs believe it is fully recoverable and are executing a restructuring plan.

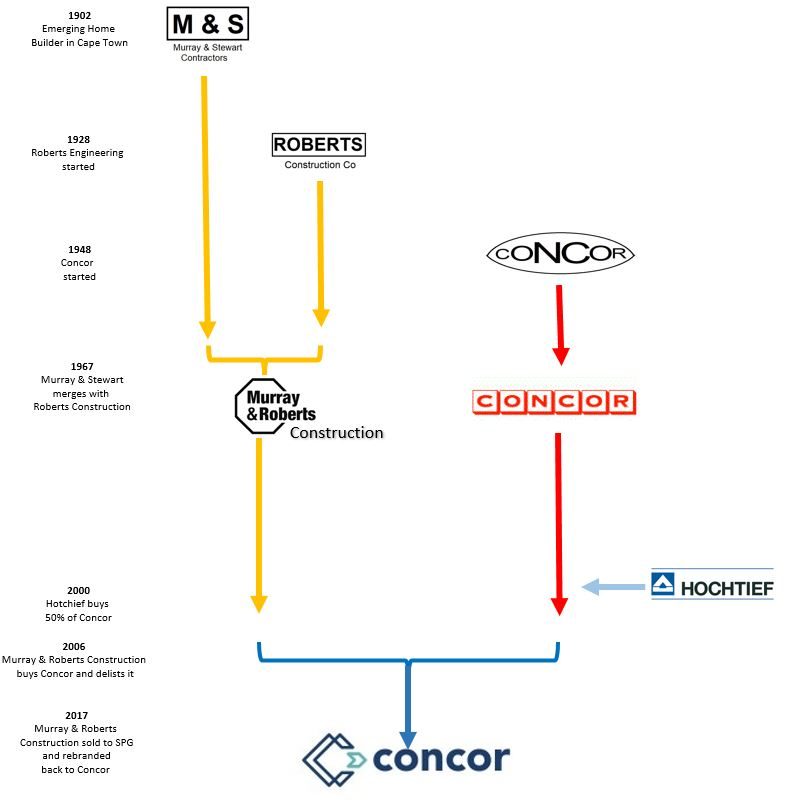
Founder companies of Concor

== Group divisions ==
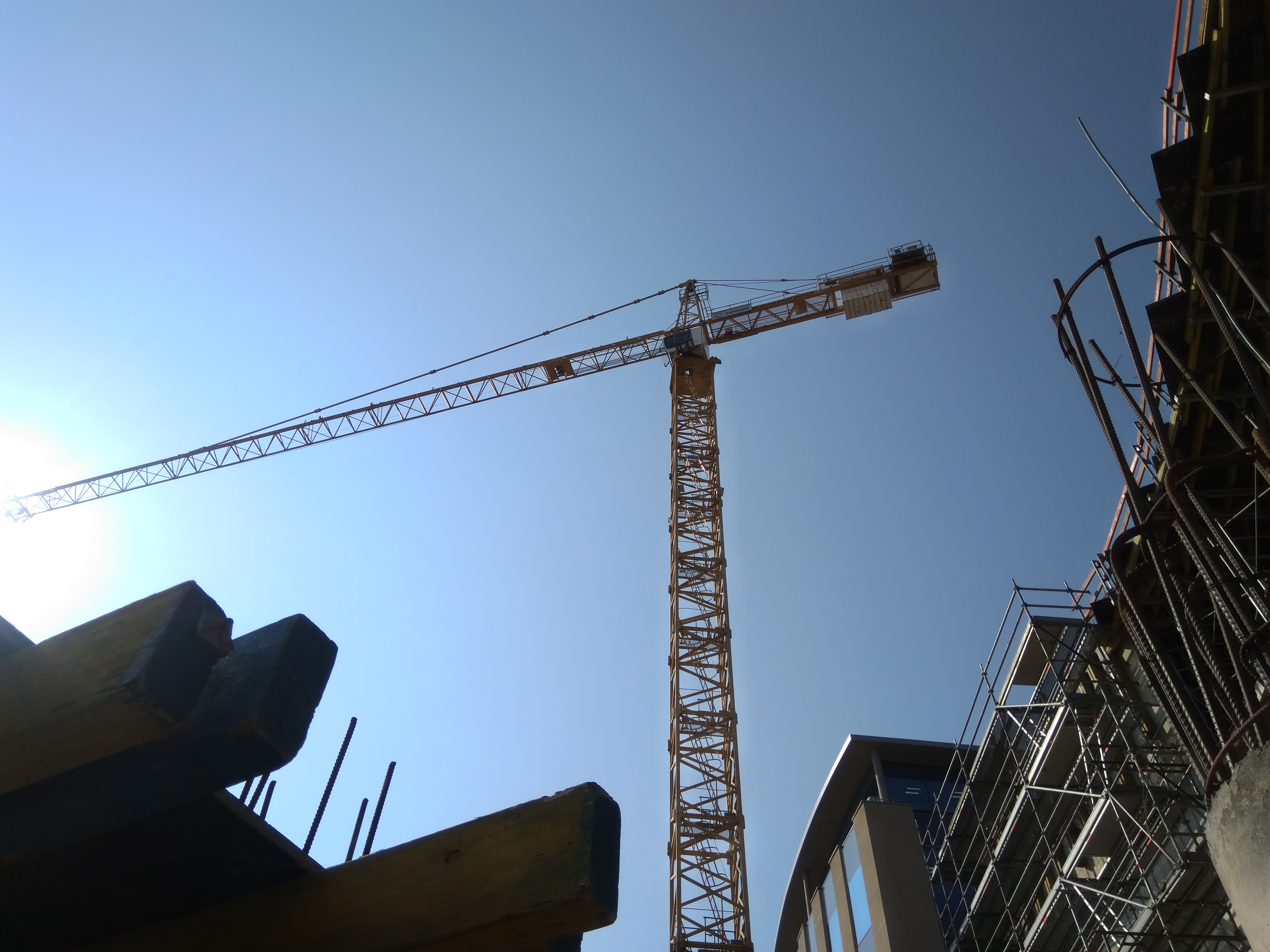
Self erecting tower crane on site

- Concor Infrastructure (Roads, bridges, waste water systems, dams, harbours, pipelines, power stations)
- Concor Buildings (Industrial, commercial, residential and office buildings)
- Concor Western Cape (Industrial, commercial, residential and office buildings)
- Concor Botswana (Industrial, commercial and office buildings)
- Concor Opencast (Contract mining)
- Concor Plant (Heavy plant maintenance and hire)
- Concor Developments
- Dynamic Concrete Namibia

== Innovation ==
Concor has several patents registered for its activities:

- ZA8405461B Shuttering improvements
- ZA8108855B Min support sub uniting
- ZA8007094B Dumper vehicles and bodies
- GB2013823A Apparatus for burying pipelines, cables etc
- ZA7403626B Structural element
- ZA7307135B Flexible lining
- ZA7004129B Improvements in or relating to paving blocks
- ZA7004128B Improvements in paving blocks

== Construction projects ==
Some of Concor's projects include:

=== 1950s ===
- 1952: High Level Reservoir, VanderbiljPark, South Africa.
- 1952: Vals River Bridge, Bothaville, South Africa.
- 1953: Sand River Bridge, Virginia, South Africa.
- 1953–1956: Storms River bridge, Eastern Cape, South Africa.

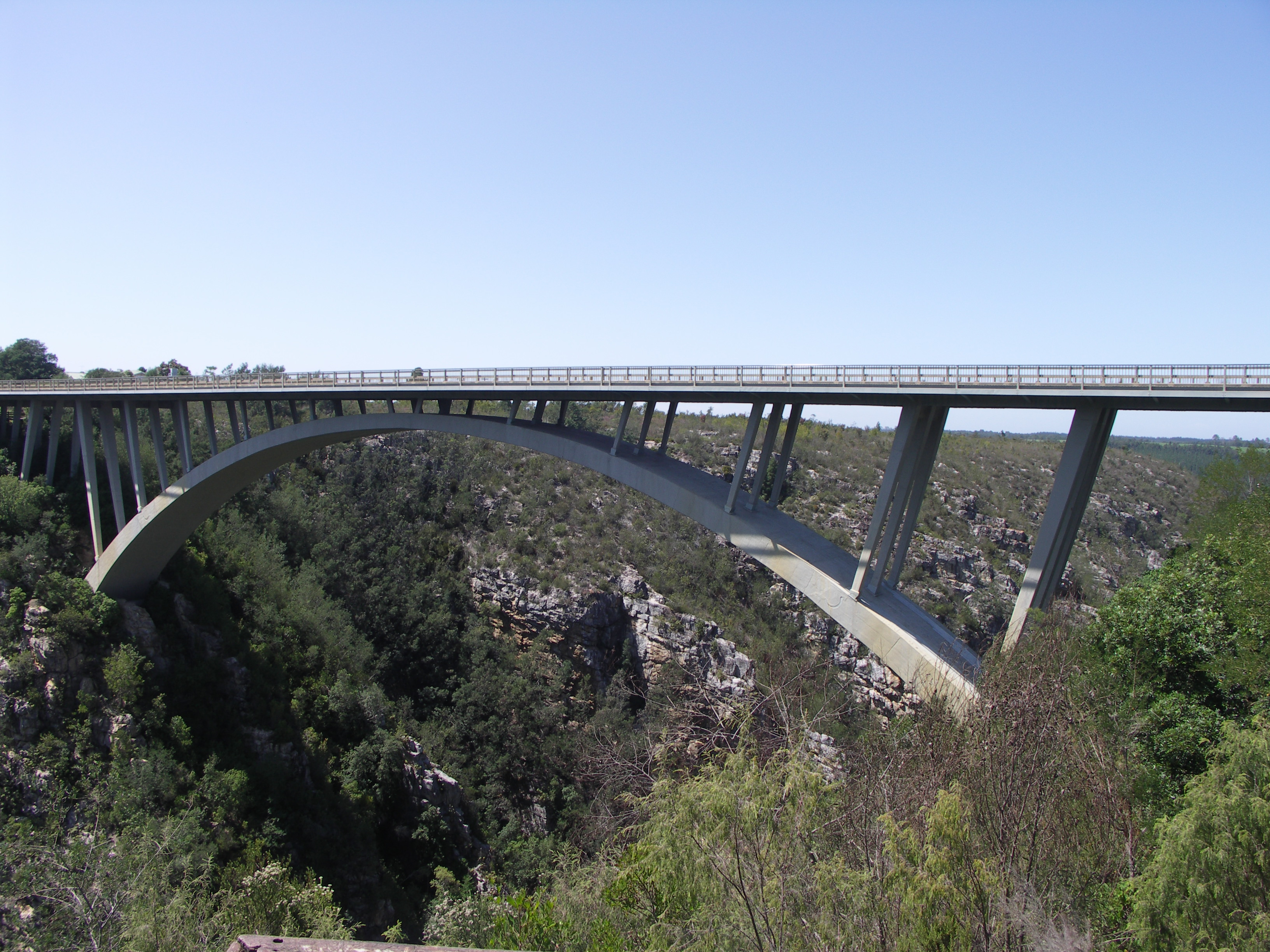
Storms River Bridge, erected 1956

- 1954: Orlando Power Station, Johannesburg, South Africa.
- 1954: Salt River Bridge, Cape Town, South Africa.
- 1954: Railway Bridge over Sand River, Virginia, South Africa.
- 1955: Taaiboshspruit Bridge, South Africa.
- 1955: Natalspruit Bridge, South Africa.
- 1955: Railway Bridge over Great Fish River, South Africa.
- 1956: Vetrivier Bridge, South Africa.
- 1957: Pipeline and Jetty, Lourenco Marques, Mozambique.
- 1958: Umsindusi River Bridge, Pietermaritzburg, South Africa.
- 1958: Railway Bridge, Congella, Durban, South Africa.
- 1958: Arch Bridge over Vaal River, Standerton, South Africa.

=== 1960s ===
- 1960: Hertzog Boulevard, Cape Town, South Africa.
- 1961–1963: Kyle/Lake Mutirikwe and Bangala Dams, Masvingo, Zimbabwe.
- 1963: SASOL 1 Chimney, Sasolburg, South Africa.
- 1963: Braamfontein Bridge, Johannesburg, South Africa.
- 1966: Amatikulu River Bridge, Natal, South Africa.
- 1966: Broadway Flyover, Durban, South Africa.
- 1967: Sabie Bypass, Mpumalanga, South Africa.
- 1967: Reduction Plant, East Driefontein, South Africa.
- 1967: Bridle Drift Dam, East London, South Africa.
- 1968: Umfolozi River Rail Bridge, KZN, South Africa.
- 1968: Arnot Power Station, Cooling Towers, Mpumalanga, South Africa.
- 1966–1969: Fox Street Hanging Building, Standard Bank Center, Johannesburg, South Africa. LCB Concortium. o

=== 1970s ===
- 1970s: Phalaborwa Copper Mine development, Limpopo, South Africa.
- 1970s–1990s: Multiple Concrete Headgears for various mining clients, Botswana, Zambia and South Africa.
- 1970–1973: Naute Dam, ǁKaras Region, Namibia.
- 1971 Ovamboland Canal, Namibia.
- 1971 Soweto Motorway, Johannesburg, South Africa.
- 1972 Paved aprons, Durban International Airport, South Africa.
- 1972 Meyershill reservoir, Johannesburg, South Africa.
- 1973 Crown Interchange, Johannesburg, South Africa.
- 1976: Matla Power Station, Concrete slides of ACC and Boiler house lift shafts, Mpumalanga, South Africa.
- 1978: Gouritz River Bridge, 270 m, 4 span structure with diagonal reinforced struts, Eastern Cape, South Africa.

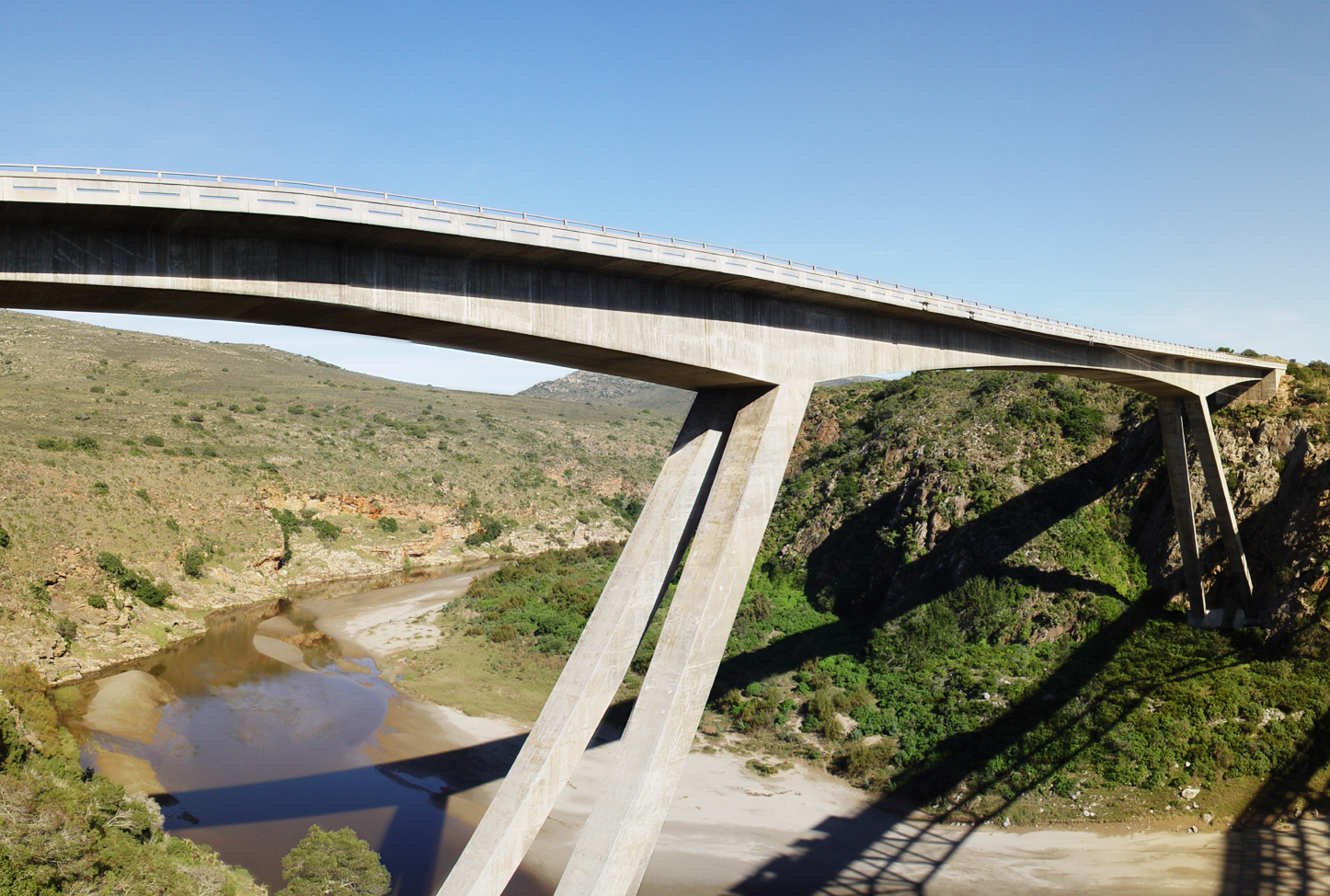
Gouritz River Bridge, erected 1978

- 1978 Tailings Dams, Anglo American, Welkom, South Africa.
- 1979 Sulphur Recovery Plant, SASOL 2, Linde, South Africa.
- 1979–1981: Sasol 3 steam plant with 300-metre high chimney, South Africa. Chimney and first boiler were commissioned in 1981.

=== 1980s ===
- 1980–1983: Bloukrans River arch-bridge, Eastern Cape, South Africa.
- 1980–1984: Steam Plants for Sasol 2 and 3, Secunda, Mpumalanga, South Africa.
- 1982: Majes Irrigation Project, Peru,
- 1983: Majuba Power Station, Boiler House and ACC concrete slides, main civils, Mpumalanga, South Africa.
- 1983: Bobbejaans River Bridge, Eastern Cape, South Africa.
- 1984: Hawane Dam, Swaziland.
- 1984: Thabina Dam, Limpopo, South Africa.
- 1984: Contract No. RT 5742E, for the construction of in-situ concrete walls and associated works in the Northern Transvaal.
- 1984–1988: 4 Kilometre long road Huguenot Tunnel, Western Cape, South Africa.
- 1984–1988: Hugos Valley Viaduct, Western Cape, South Africa.

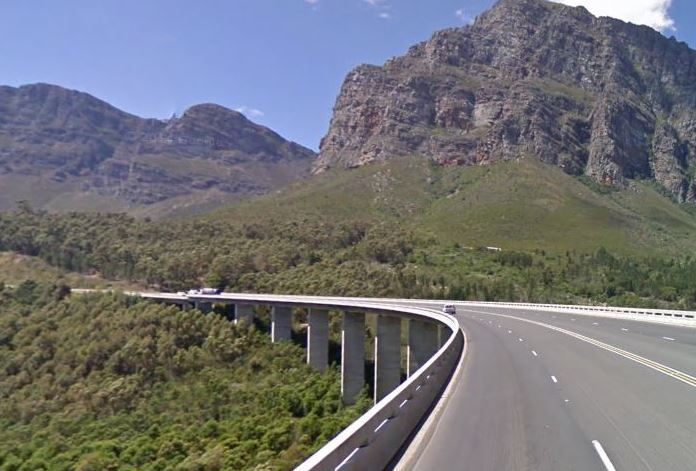
Hugos River Viaduct, erected 1988

- 1985–1988: Johannesburg Academic Hospital, South Africa.
- 1986: Usutu Pulp Mill, Swaziland.
- 1989-1990: American Embassy, Pretoria, South Africa.

=== 1990s ===
- 1993: Pavilion Mall, Durban, South Africa.
- 1994: Sanlam Forum Building, C/o Church and Queen Streets, Pretoria, South Africa.
- 1998: Injaka Bridge, collapsed during construction, but eventually completed.
- 1988 - 1989: Reserve Bank, 37 story skyscraper, first flushed-glazed building in the southern hemisphere, Pretoria, South Africa.
- 1991 - 1992: Wanderers Cricket Stadium rebuild, Johannesburg, South Africa.
- 1988 - 1993: Matimba Power Station, main civils, Lephalale, Limpopo, South Africa.

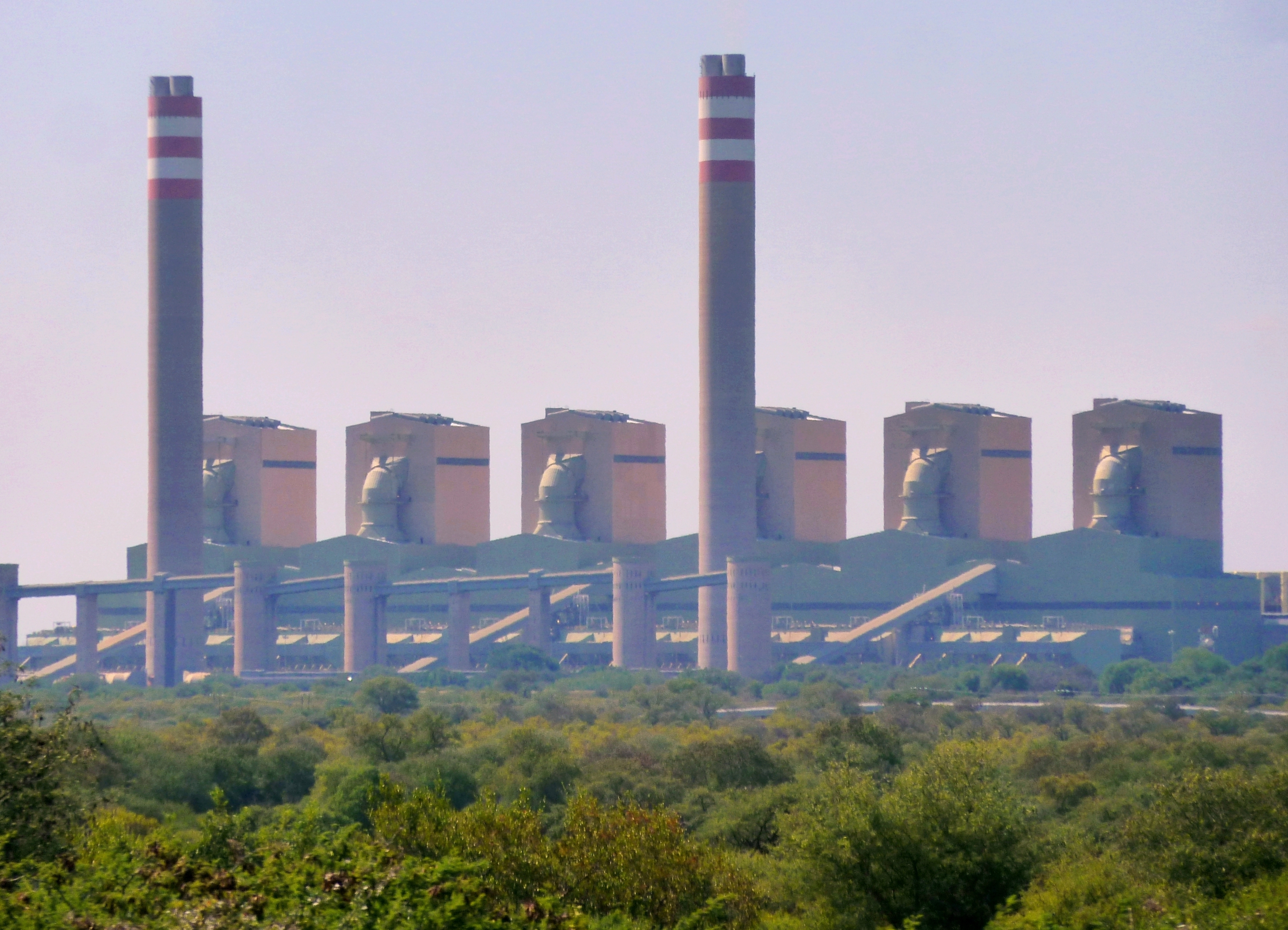
Matimba Power Station, erected 1992

- 1993 - 1996: Katse Dam, Lesotho, JV with Hochtief

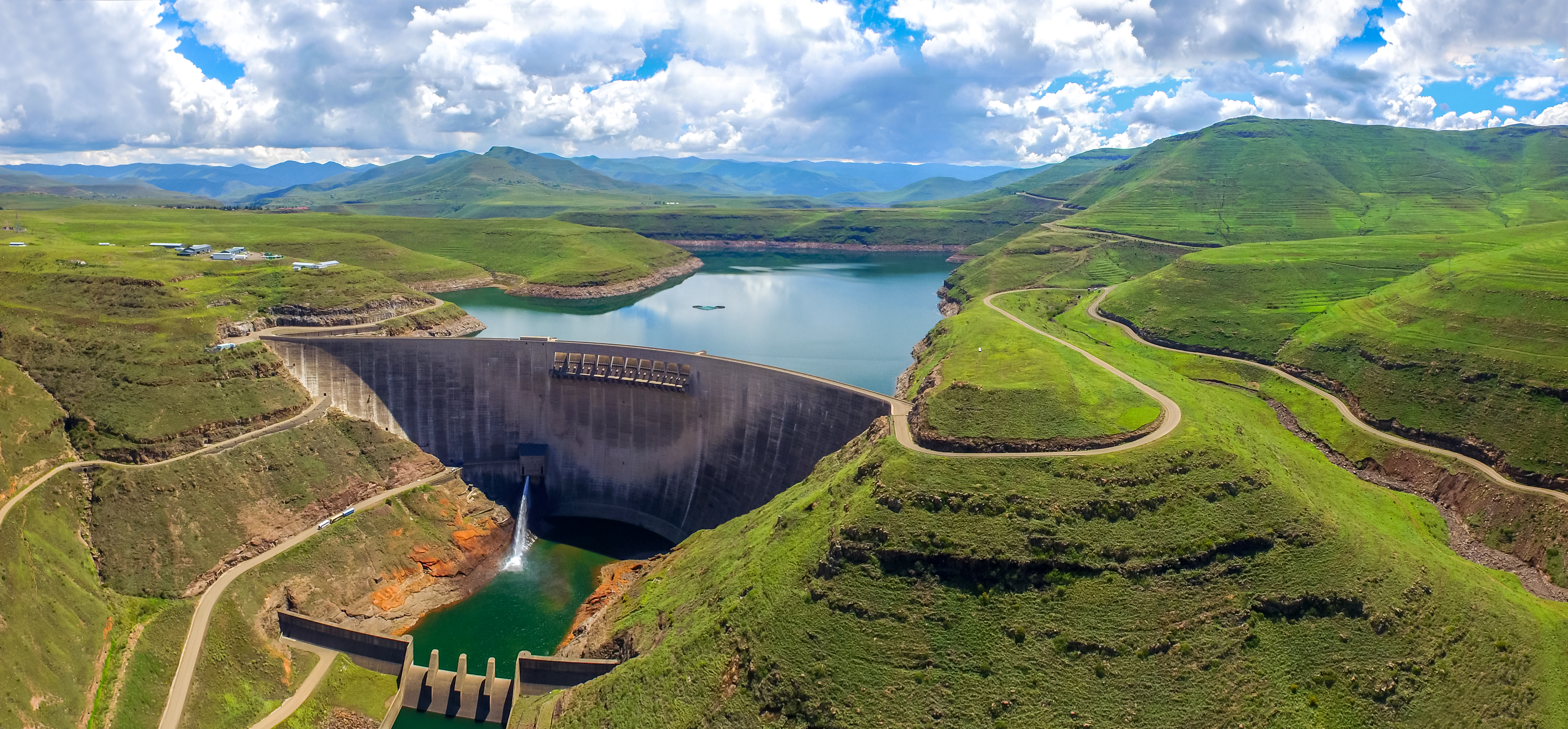
Katse Dam, erected 1996

- 1998: Mozal Aluminium Smelter, Maputo, Mozambique.
- 1999: Debswana Orapa Mine Expansion, Francistown, Botswana.

=== 2000s ===
- 2000: Impala Platinum Shaft 14 development, multi-blast ventilation facilities, overland rock conveyor, upgrading of hoisting facilities, surface ore transfer silos, Rustenburg, South Africa.
- 2000 - 2002: National Bank of Dubai, UAE.
- 2000: Kutama Sinthumule Correctional Centre, Makhado, South Africa.
- 2000: Cape Town and Johannesburg International Airports radar towers. (31 and 54 m each)
- 2001: OR Tambo International Airport, Charlie Taxiway, Johannesburg, South Africa.
- 2001: Bakwena Platinum Highway, 380 kilometer upgrade of N1 and N4 highways.
- 2002-2001: Gold Reef City, main complex, Johannesburg, South Africa.
- 2002: Airports Company South Africa (ACSA) Johannesburg International Domestic Terminal, (AC Consortium).
- 2002–2004: Katima Mulilo Bridge, between Namibia and Zambia

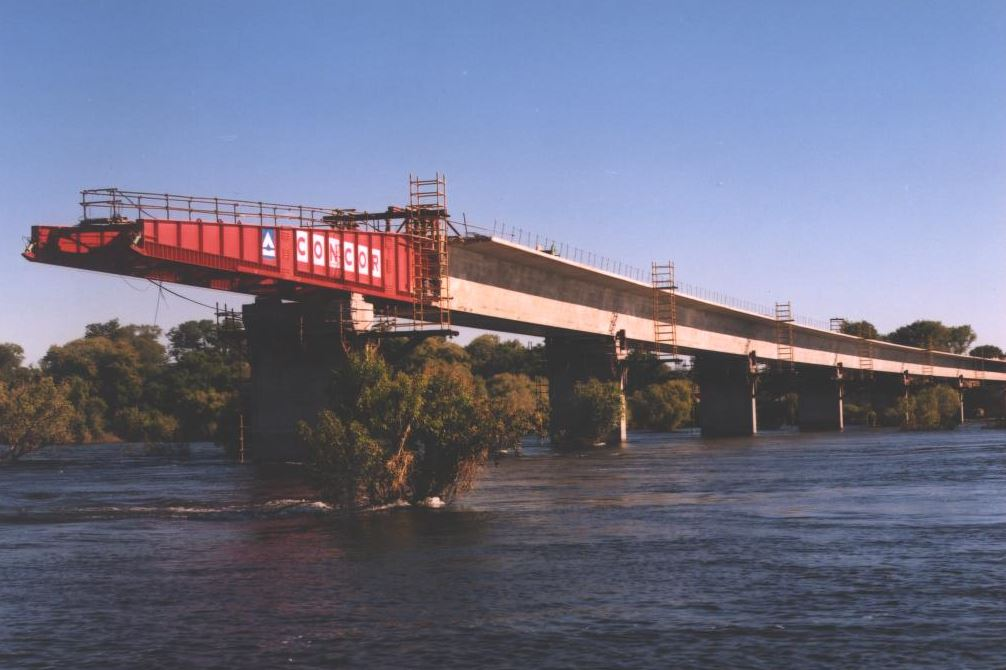
Katima Mulilo Incremental Bridge launch, 2003

- 2002–2009: Port of Ngqura, Coega, new port construction consisting of: eastern breakwater, 2.7 km in length extending into Algoa Bay to a maximum water depth of 18 metres. A secondary western breakwater 1.125 km in length to a water depth of 15m. Five berths, 1,800m of quay wall – two for containers, two for dry bulk and breakbulk cargo and one for liquid bulk cargo. JV with Hochtief, Port Elizabeth, South Africa.
- 2007—2012: Port of Ngqura, Container Terminal, civil works phase 2, Coega, extension of container terminal and quay walls to make provision for two more ship berths. JV with Hochtief, Port Elizabeth, South Africa.
- 2004: World Trade Centre, Manama, Bahrain.
- 2005: Lusip Dam, Swaziland.
- 2005: Debswana Diamond Sorting Centre, Gaborone, Botswana.
- 2005–2007: Durban Harbour Tunnel, 515m service tunnel underneath Durban Harbour entrance. JV with Hochtief, Durban, South Africa.
- 2006-2008: Sandton Holiday Inn, Johannesburg, South Africa.
- 2007-2009: PPC Hercules: Bulk cement and clinker silos.
- 2007: Oprah Winfrey Leadership Academy for Girls, Henley on Klip, Gauteng, South Africa.
- 2007–2014: Ingula Power Station, bulk earthworks and civils of Bedford and Braamhoek storage dams, South Africa.
- 2008: P.G. Bison Particleboard facility, Uigie, South Africa.
- 2008: Sishen Iron Ore Mine Expansion Project, Northern Cape, South Africa.
- 2008–2014: Medupi Power Station Chimneys contract. Two way joint venture with Kareena Africa, Limpopo, South Africa.

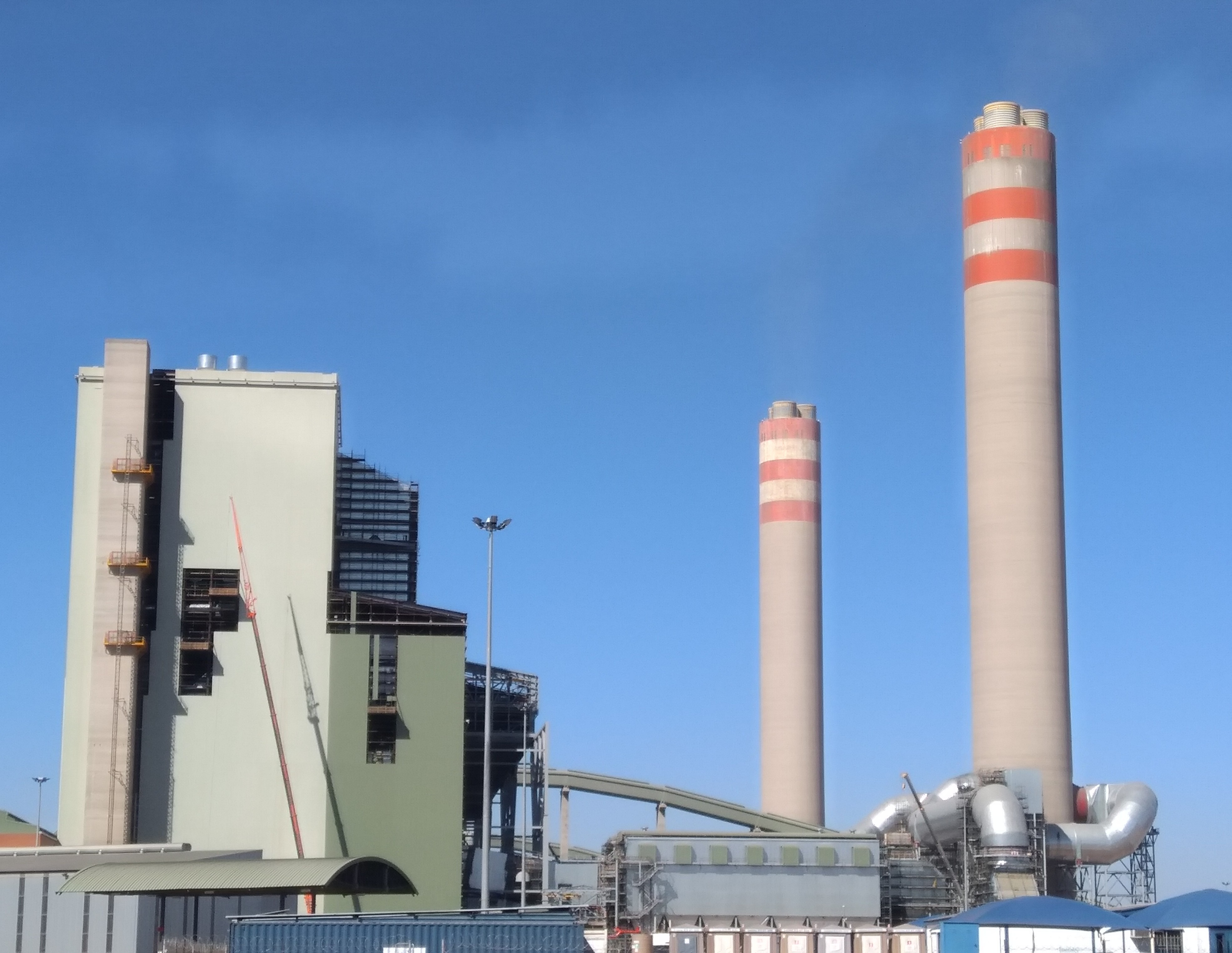
Main civils of Medupi Power Station 2008

- 2008–2015: Kusile Power Station Chimneys contract. Two way joint venture with Kareena Africa, Mpumalanga, South Africa.
- 2008:Mpumalanga Tourism and Parks Agency Head Office, Halls Gateway, Mbombela, Mpumalanga, South Africa.
- 2009:Gathemann/Mutual Tower, 20 story green building, Windhoek, Namibia.
- 2009: Vaal River Eastern Subsystem Augmentation Project (Vresap), 121 kilometre water catchment transfer pipeline, Free State to Gauteng, South Africa.

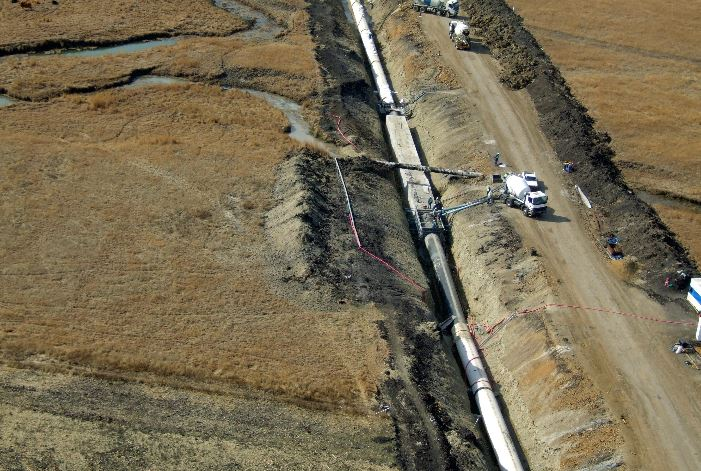
Vresap Pipeline, 2009

- 2009: Bulk Diamond Clearing Centre, Gaborone, Botswana.
- 2009: Gateway Mall, Athlone, Cape Town, South Africa.
- 2008-2009: Department of Foreign Affairs, new ministry head office, Pretoria, South Africa.
- 2008: British Consulate, Harare, Zimbabwe.
- 2008–present: Medupi Power Station Main civils contract. Three way joint venture with Aveng and Murray and Roberts, Limpopo, South Africa.

=== 2010s ===
- 2010: Assmang Ore Heavy Rail Loop, Northern Cape, South Africa.
- 2011: Kolomela Mine Expansion Project: 36 km Sishen-Saldanha rail connection.
- 2012 Ruacana Power Station, 4th turbine main civils, Namibia.
- 2012: City Deep Container Terminal, Johannesburg, South Africa.
- 2012: Lanseria Bulk-water Reservoir, Johannesburg, South Africa.

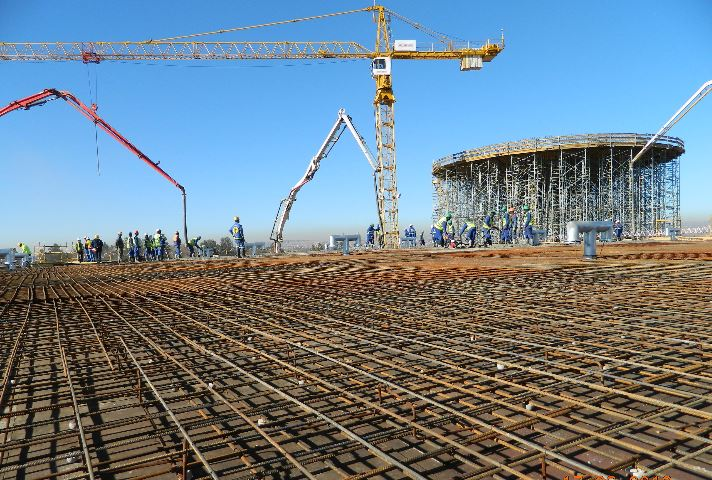
Lanseria Reservoir, 2012

- 2012–2014: Portside Building. 5 Star Green Building, Cape Town, South Africa.
- 2012: Lanseria Reservoir, Johannesburg, South Africa.
- 2013: Driefontein Waste Water Treatment Works, Johannesburg, South Africa.
- 2013 - 2014: The Grove Mall, Windhoek, Namibia.
- 2014: 102 Rivonia. 4 Star Green Building, Sandton, South Africa.
- 2014: Al Raha beach luxury apartments, Abu Dhabi, UAE.
- 2014: Lesedi Solar Power Station, Bulk earthworks and civils, South Africa.
- 2014: GCIS Tshedimosetso House, 4 Star Green Building, Pretoria, South Africa.
- 2014: Venetia Diamond Mine, underground development, Limpopo, South Africa.
- 2014–2015: Jeffreys Bay Wind Farm, Eastern Cape, South Africa.

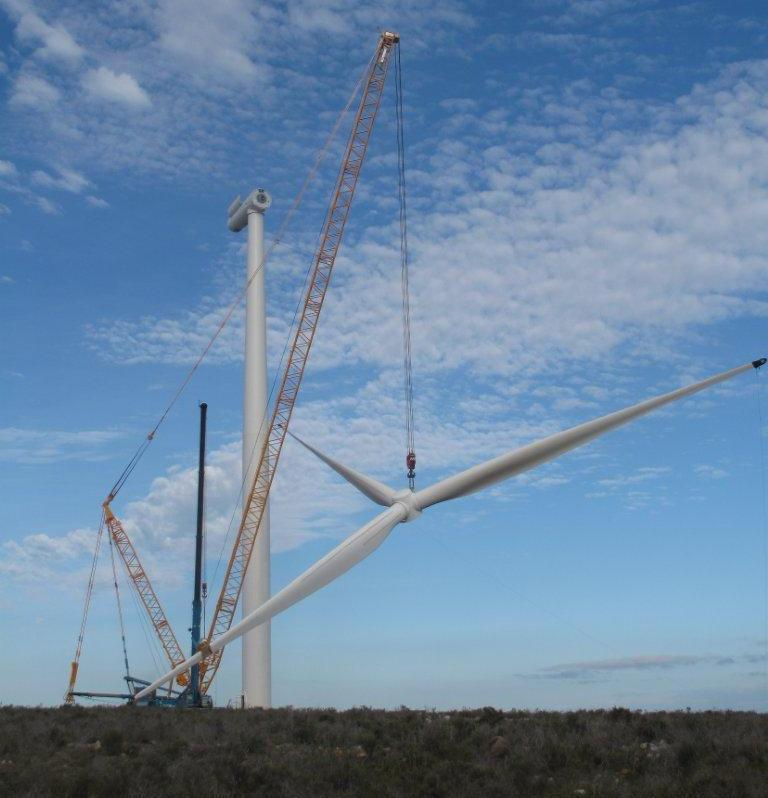
Jeffreys Bay Wind Farm, 2015

- 2014: N4 Middleburg Highway upgrade, Mpumalanga, South Africa.
- 2014: Baywest Mall, Port Elizabeth, South Africa.
- 2015–2017: Grayston Pedestrian and Cycle Bridge
- 2015–present: Mogalakwena Tailings Facility, Northern Limpopo, South Africa.
- 2015–2016: De Aar Wind Farm, Northern Cape, South Africa.
- 2016: Tsogo Sun Hotel, Western Cape, South Africa.
- 2016–2017: Menlyn Park Mall Rebuild. 4 Star Green Building, biggest mall by lettable floor space in South Africa,
- 2016–2017: R72 Highway between Port Alfred and Fish River, Eastern Cape, South Africa.

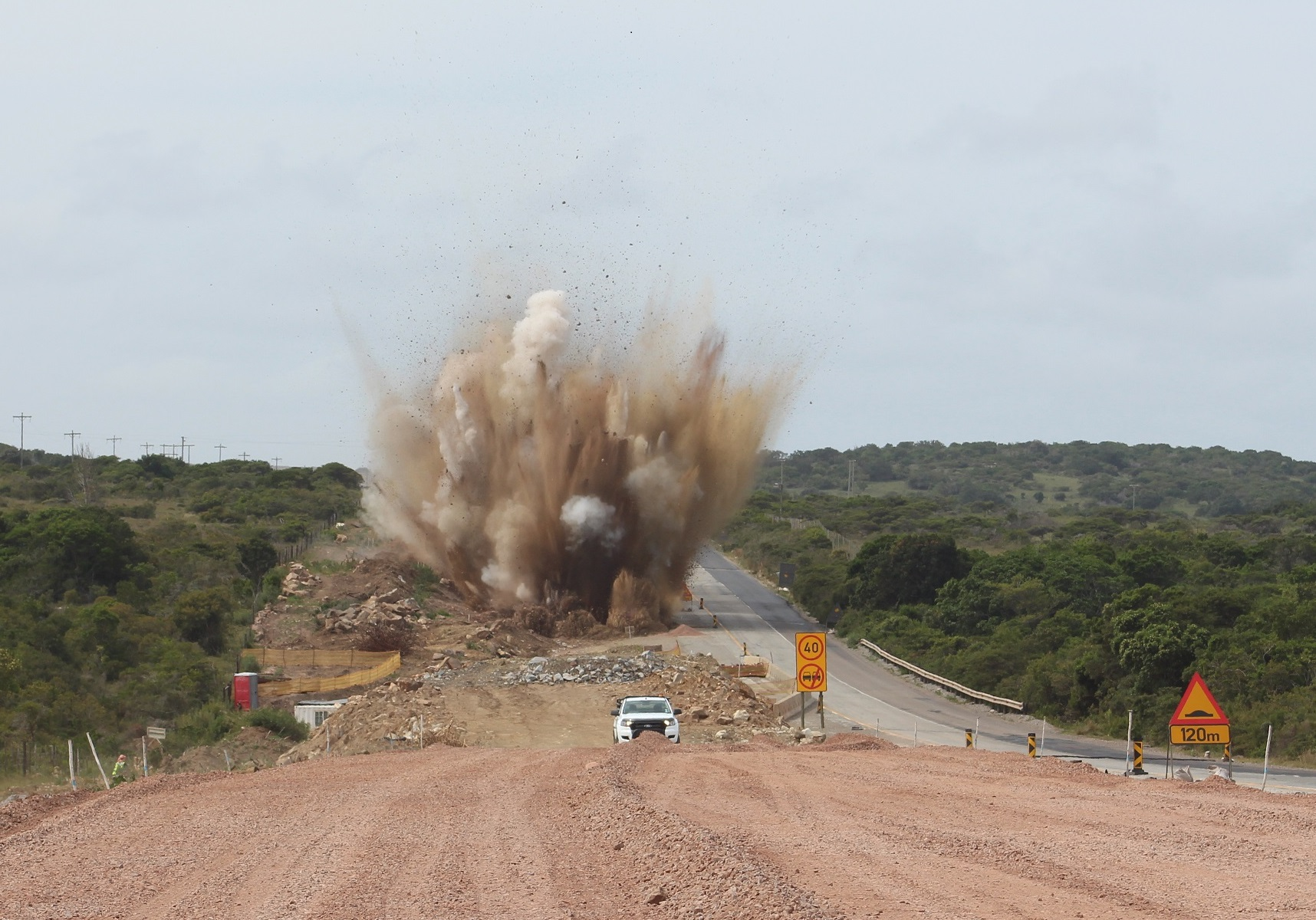
Port Alfred Highway widening

- 2016–2017: BCX Centurion. Green Building, Pretoria, South Africa.
- 2016–2017: Century City Urban Square, 4 Star Green Building, Cape Town, South Africa.
- 2016–2017: Embassy Towers, Sandton, South Africa.
- 2017-2018: Skukuza Safari Lodge, Kruger National Park, South Africa.
- 2017: Radisson Blu Hotel Cape Town, South Africa.
- 2017–2019: Khobab Wind Farm, Northern Cape, South Africa.
- 2017–present: Belfast Coal Mine, Middelbug, South Africa. Construction of 4 major dams, 26 concrete platforms and terraces, 37 internal roads, and upgrade of adjacent provincial roads
- 2017–present: Mtunzini National Road Upgrade, Kwa-Zulu Natal, South Africa.
- 2017–present: Load and Haul, Zwartfontein Pit, Mogalakwena Platinum Mine, Limpopo, South Africa.
- 2018–2020: 16 on Bree, Tallest residential building in Cape Town, South Africa.
- 2018–present: Kangans Wind Farm, 140 MW situated 52 km east of Springbok, Northern Cape, South Africa.
- 2018–2019: Perdekraal Wind Farm, 110 MW 80 km northeast of Ceres, Western Cape, South Africa.
- 2018–2020: Golden Valley Wind Farm, 120 MW, near the town of Bedford, Eastern Cape, South Africa.
- 2019–present: Msikaba Bridge, 580m cable-stay main span bridge, near Lusikisiki, Eastern Cape, South Africa.
- 2019–2021: Roggeveld Wind Farm, 147 MW near Laingsburg, Northern Cape, South Africa.

=== 2020s ===
- 2020: Excelsior Wind Farm, Western Cape, South Africa.
- 2020-2021: MeerKAT Extension Project, Carnavon, Northern Cape, South Africa.
- 2020-2022: Oxford Parks Multi 5 and 6 star Green Building precinct, Dunkeld, South Africa.
- 2022: Ikusasa, 6 Star Green Building, Rosebank, South Africa.
- 2023: Phezokumoya Wind Farm, Eastern Cape, South Africa.
- 2023: Sankraal Wind Farm, Eastern Cape, South Africa.
- 2023: Wolf Wind Farm, Eastern Cape, South Africa.
- 2024: Eastgate Mall Solar Deck, Gauteng, South Africa.
- 2024: Venetia Diamond Mine, Pollution Control Dams, Limpopo, South Africa.
- 2026: Khubelu and Mabiyaneng river bridges, Lesotho.

== Gallery ==
Hartebeetspoort satellite tracking station, South Africa, 1961.

Umfolozi Rail River Bridge, South Africa, 1971.

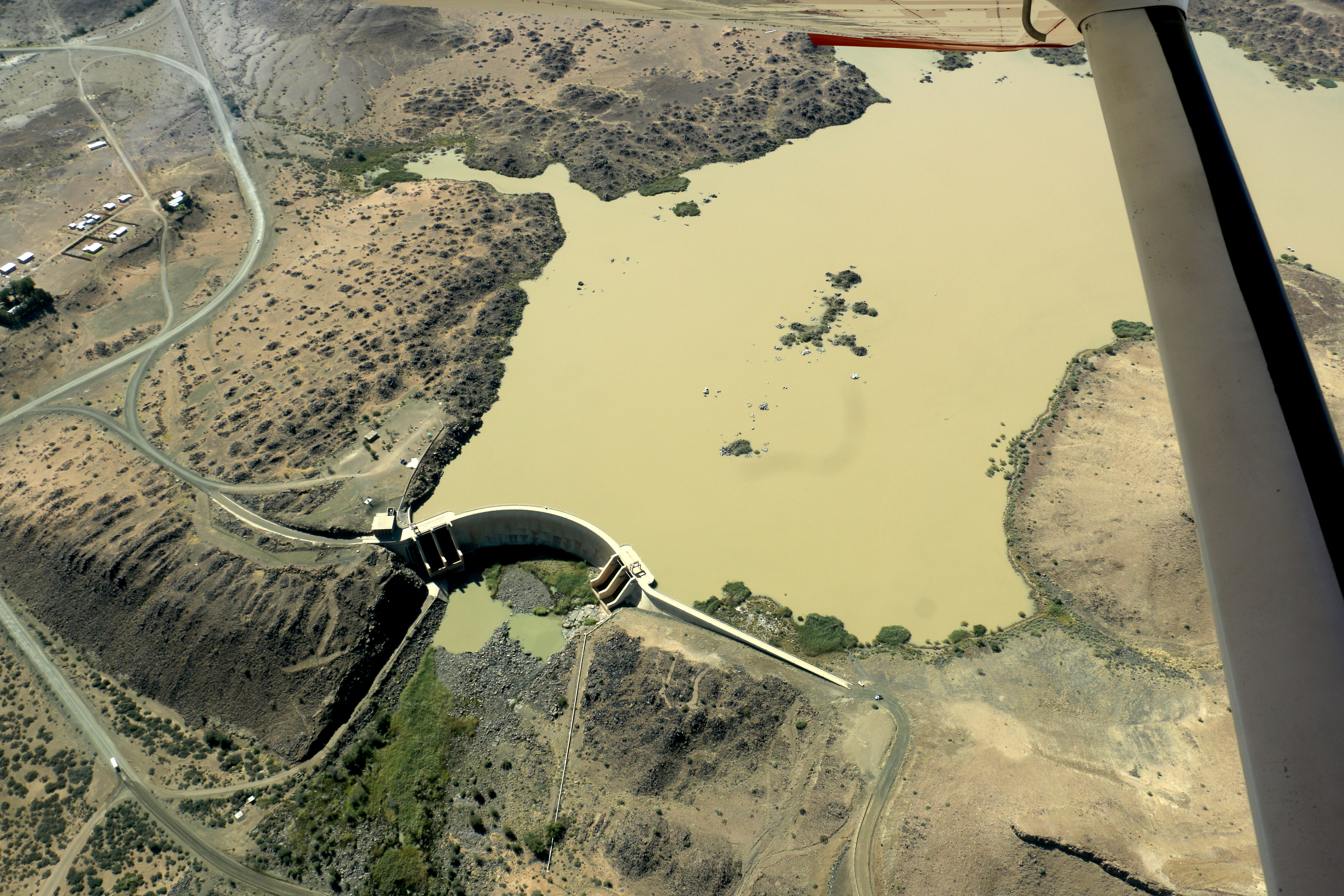
Naute Dam Karas, Namibia, 1973.

East Driefontein Slipformed 77m headgear, South Africa, 1982.

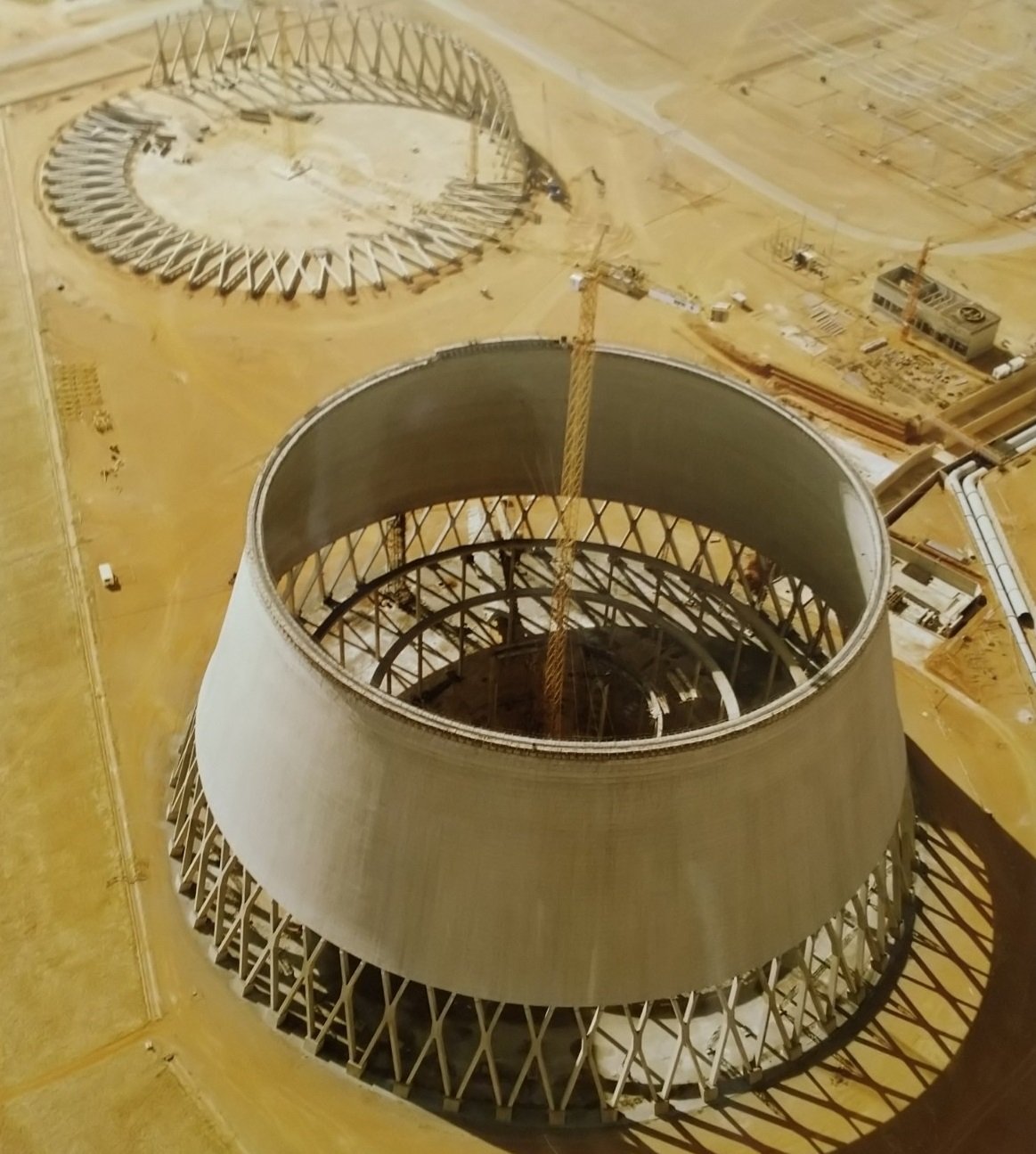
Kendal Power Station Dry Cooling Towers, South Africa, 1983.

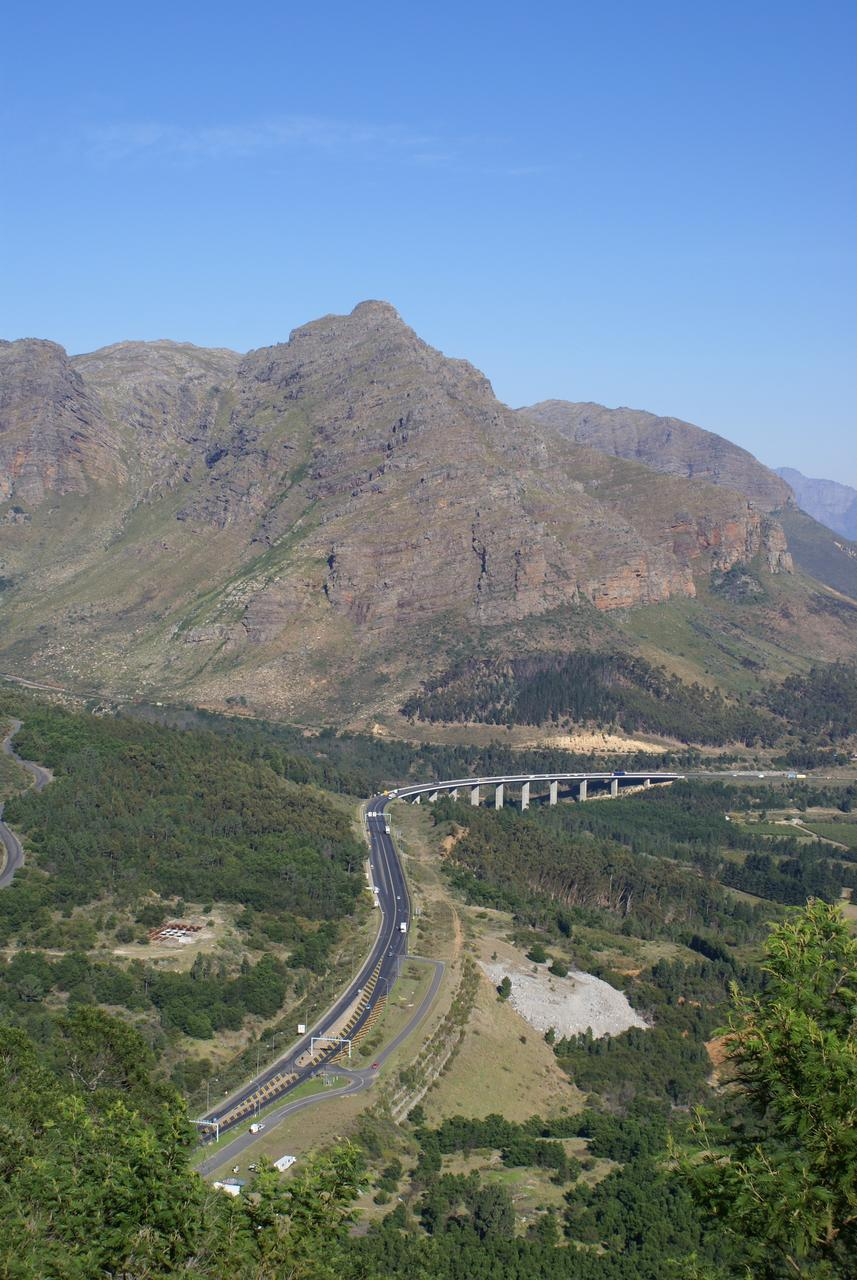
Highway leading into Huguenot Tunnel, Western Cape, South Africa, 1988.

218 km Trans Kalahari Highway Botswana, 1988.

Mozal Smelter Mozambique, 1988.

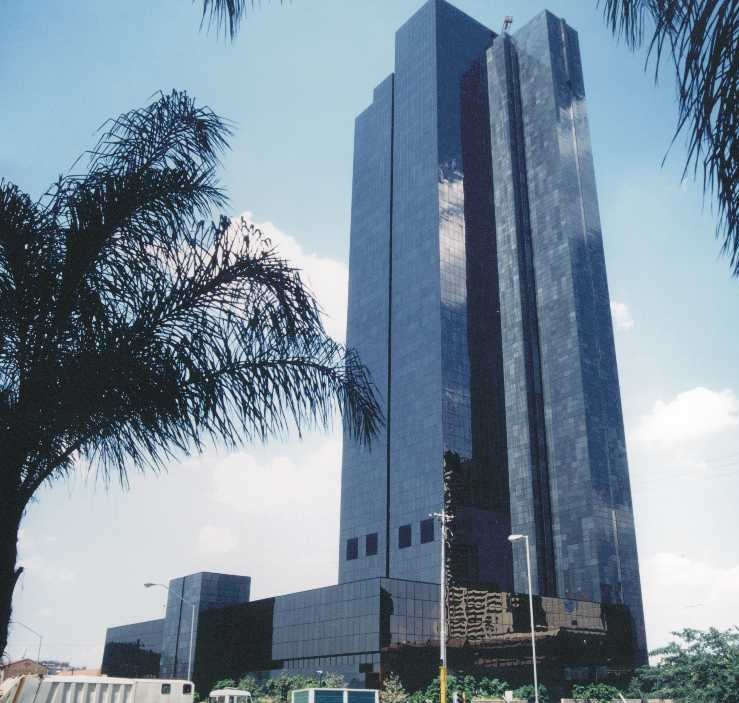
South African Reserve Bank,37 story flush glazed skyscraper, Pretoria, South Africa, 1989.

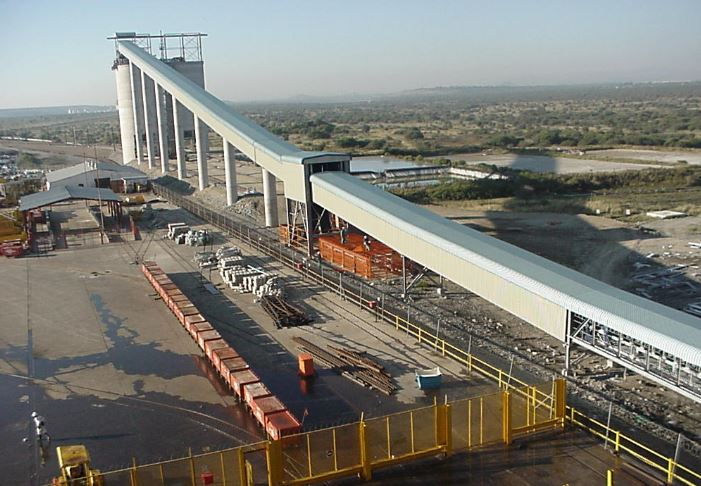
Impala Platinum No 14 shaft, Limpopo, South Africa, 2000.

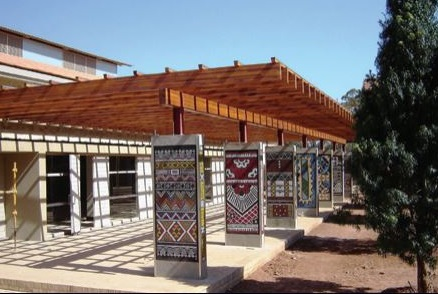
Oprah Winfrey Leadership Academy for Girls, Gauteng, South Africa, 2007.

Freedom Park Memorial Pretoria, South Africa, 2007.

Coega Port Rail Link, South Africa, 2007.

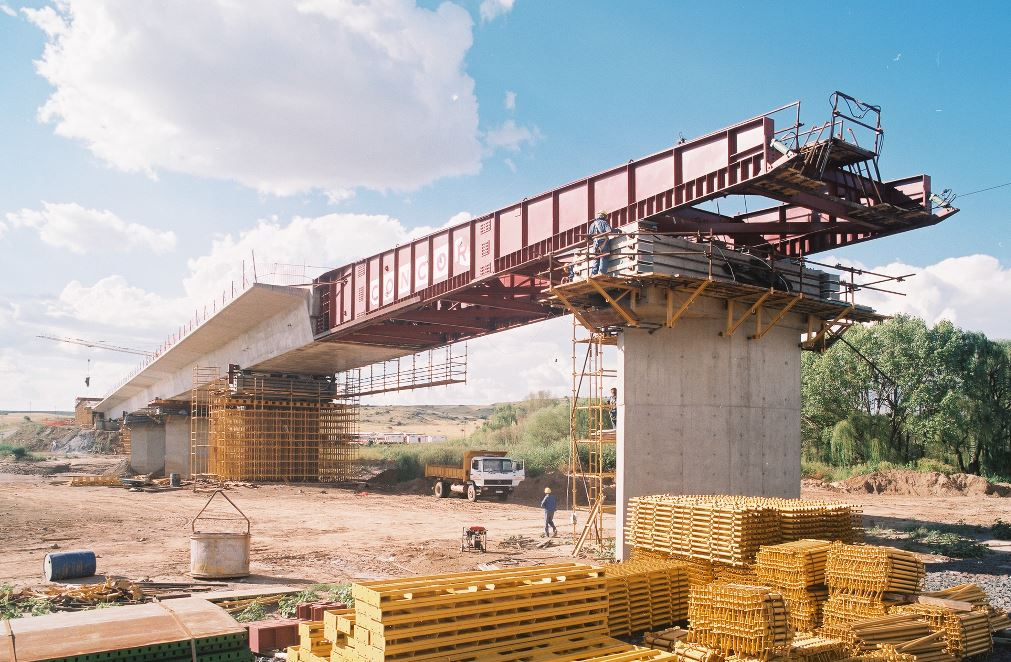
Caledon River Incremental Bridge launch South Africa to Lesotho, 2008.

Midrand Highway Interchange, South Africa, 2009.

Ruacana Hydroelectric Power Station turbine installation, Namibia, 2011.

Driefontein Waste Water Treatment Plant, South Africa, 2011.

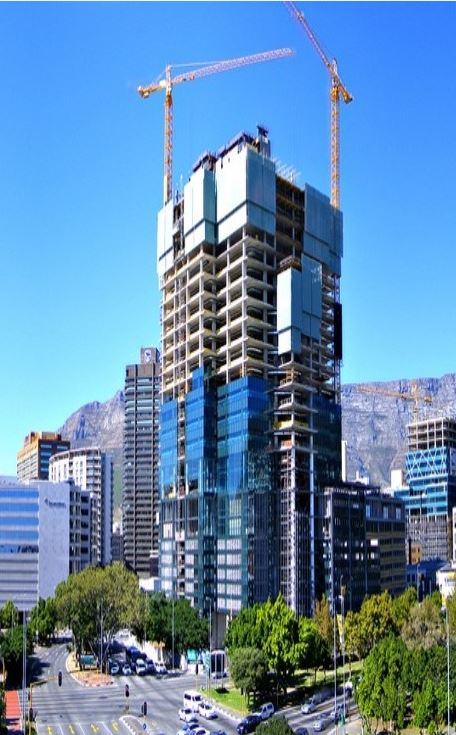
Portside Building, Cape Town, Western Cape, South Africa, 2013.

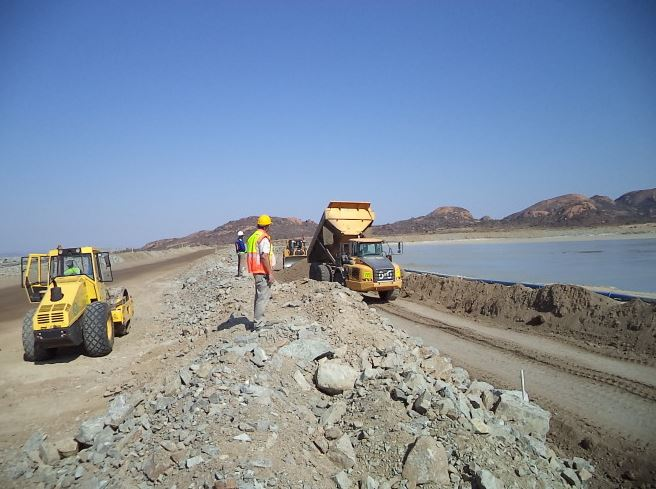
Mogalakwena Mine tailings dam, Limpopo South Africa, 2015.

National Stadium Gaberone, Botswana, 2016.

== Logos ==
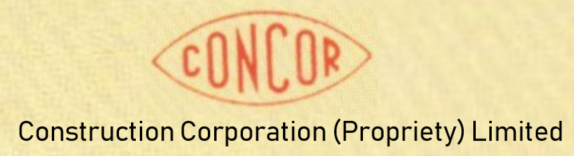
Original Concor Logo 1948

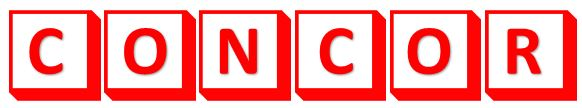
Concor Logo up to 2006

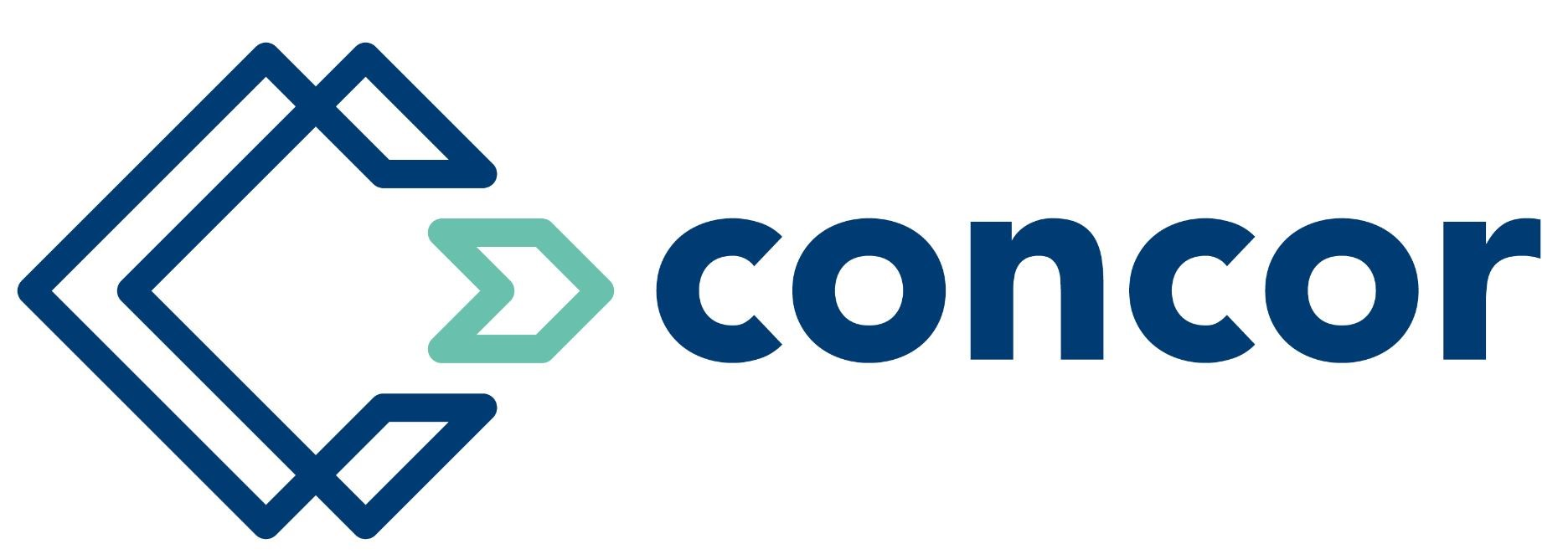
Concor Logo 2017 to current

== See also ==
- Construction industry in South Africa
