= Riverlands (Cape Town) =

Mixed-use development in Cape Town

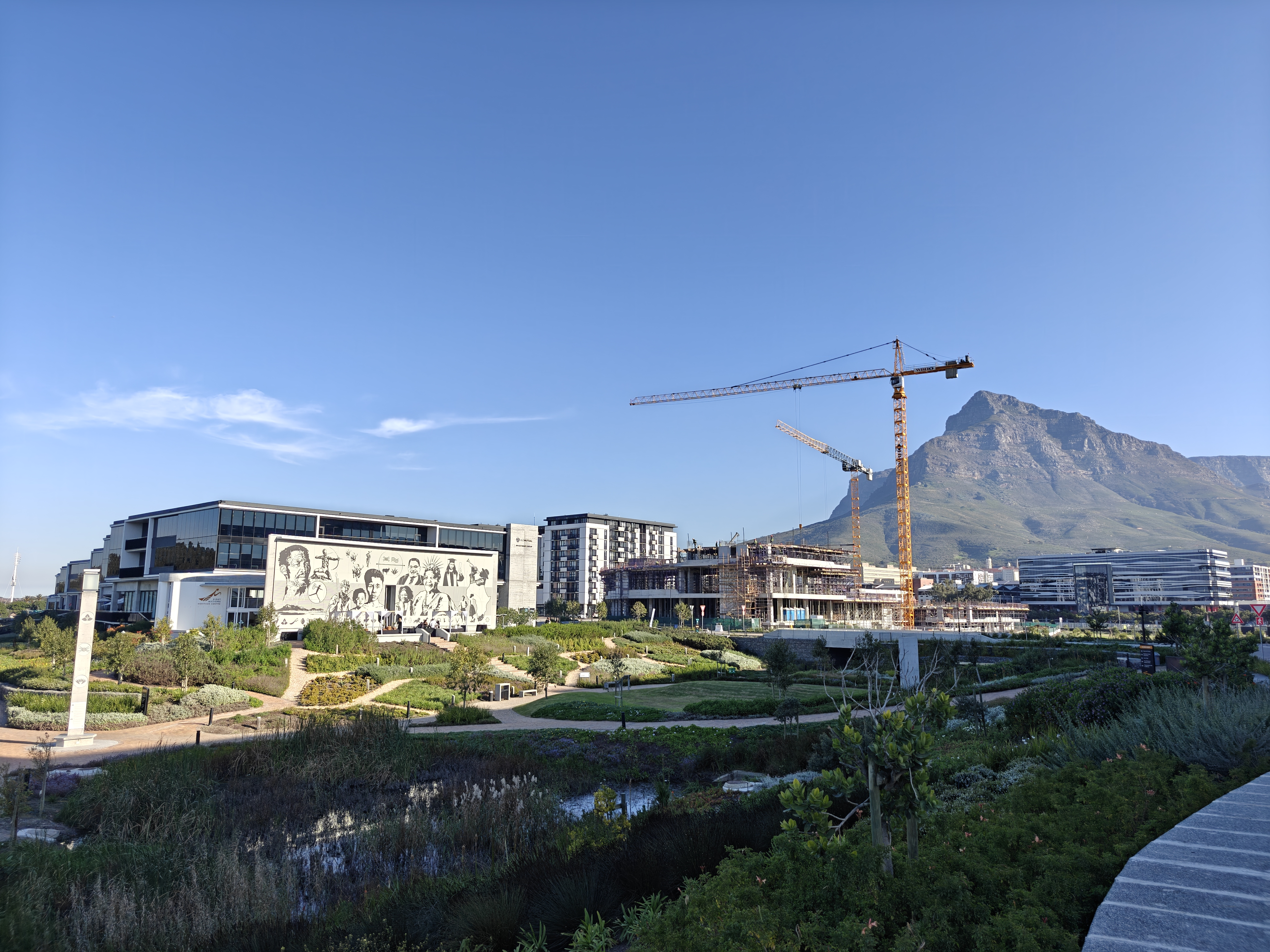
- View southwest, across part of the Eco Park, towards various Riverlands buildings, with Table Mountain in the background
- Interactive map of the Riverlands area

General information
- Status: Under construction (partially open)
- Type: Mixed-use development
- Architectural style: Contemporary
- Location: Gogosoa Street, Observatory, Cape Town, South Africa
- Coordinates: 33°56′1.9″S 18°28′23.7″E
- Current tenants: Amazon
- Construction started: 2021; 5 years ago
- Estimated completion: 2027; 1 year's time
- Opened: 2024; 2 years ago
- Cost: R4.5 billion
- Owner: Liesbeek Leisure Properties Trust
- Landlord: Zenprop

Technical details
- Grounds: 14 acres, including a 2-acre public park

Design and construction
- Architecture firm: Vivid Architects
- Developer: Zenprop (commercial and retail) and Signatura (residential)
- Services engineer: Zutari and Selkirk & Selkirk
- Other designers: Paragon Architects; Noero Architects; Planning Partners; MLS Urban Design; Red Landscape Architects; Peninsula Landscaping
- Quantity surveyor: MLC
- Awards: 5-Star Sustainable Precinct (Green Building Council South Africa)
- Known for: Ecological restoration of the Liesbeek River, and the site of Amazon's Africa HQ

Website
- riverlands.capetown

Riverlands is a mixed-use development in the suburb of Observatory, in Cape Town, South Africa. Situated beside the Liesbeek River, the development comprises multiple distinct buildings situated on a 14 hectare plot, and includes the Riverlands Mall, three luxury condo buildings with around 700 units combined, commercial office space, public green space, and the headquarters of Amazon Africa.

== History ==
Riverlands is built on a plot of land formerly owned by South African national rail operator Transnet. It was sold to Liesbeek Leisure Properties Trust in 2015, for a total of R12 million.

Development for Riverlands began in 2021.

E-commerce company Amazon began occupying its new Africa HQ at Riverlands in December 2023.

In October 2024, it was reported that Riverlands would soon hand over developments in the area surrounding its land, to the City of Cape Town and the Western Cape Provincial Government. These included a new roadway and bridge linking Observatory with Ndabeni, an upgrade to Berkley Road, external bulk works surrounding the development, and the Liesbeek riverine rehabilitation.

The combined cost of the projects was R120 million, and was part of developer Zenprop's commitment to upgrade public infrastructure in the area surrounding Riverlands. Cape Town Mayor Geordin Hill-Lewis welcomed the development on behalf of the City of Cape Town, saying it would be of great economic benefit to the city.

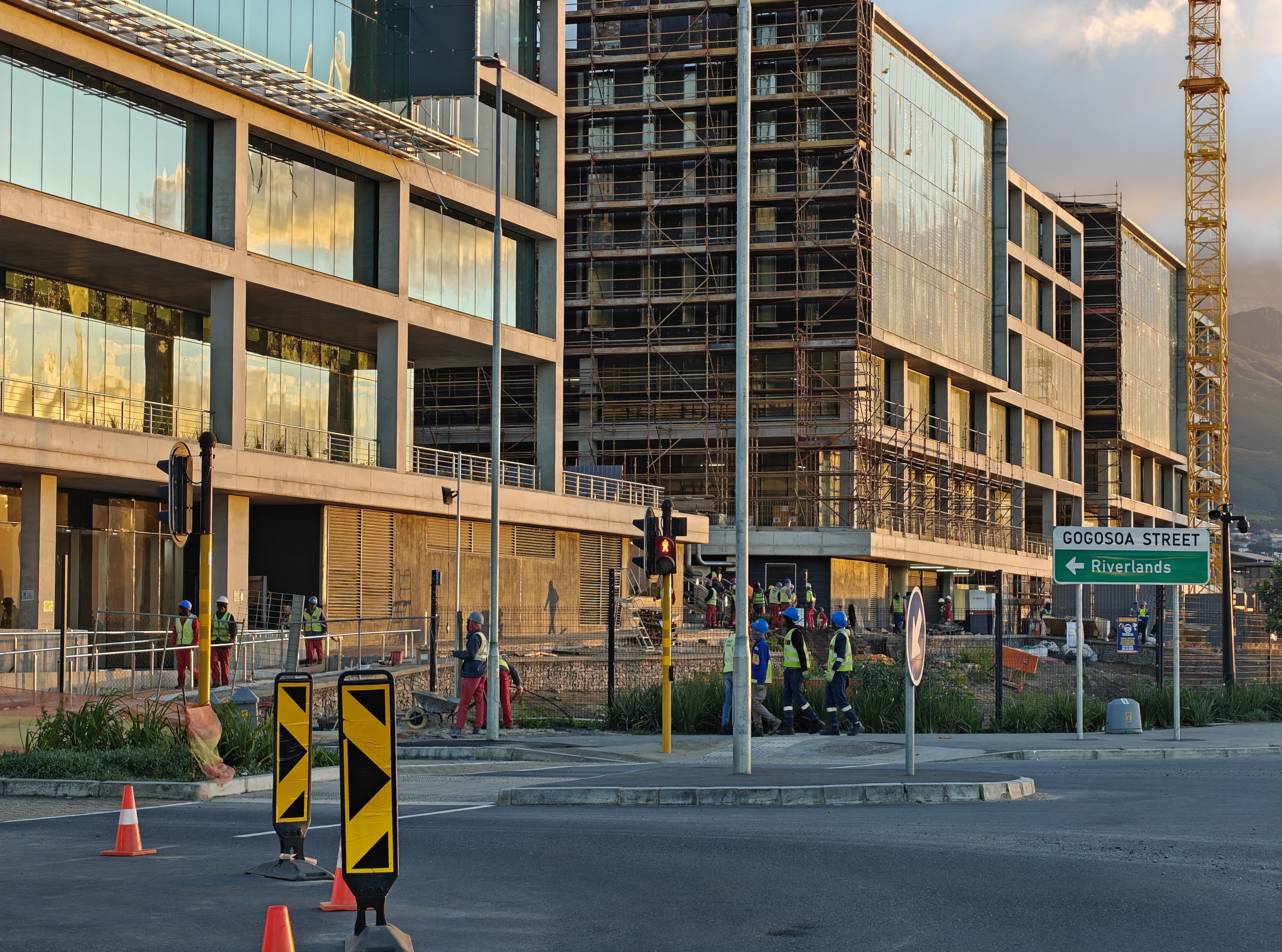
WBHO construction crew working on the Berkley Road side of Riverlands, in August 2026

Riverlands opened to the public in late 2024.

In January 2025, at its Riverlands Africa HQ, Amazon opened a walk-in center to assist prospective sellers with getting set up on its platform within a day. A world first for Amazon, the facility enables sellers to activate their e-commerce store profiles and list their products. The opening of the facility followed the launch of Amazon.co.za in May 2024.

In February 2025, coworking company Venture Workspace opened a 2,000 sqm facility in Riverlands - its largest across its entire portfolio.

In March 2025, Riverlands officially attained a 5-star sustainability rating from the Green Building Council of South Africa (GBCSA). The development was people-centric and socially inclusive in its design; included a 2-acre Eco Park and 6 km of trails; restored the riverine ecosystem along the Liesbeek River; all buildings on the site were designed to exceed energy efficiency standards; and over 30% of the precinct's energy demand is met through on-site solar PV installations.

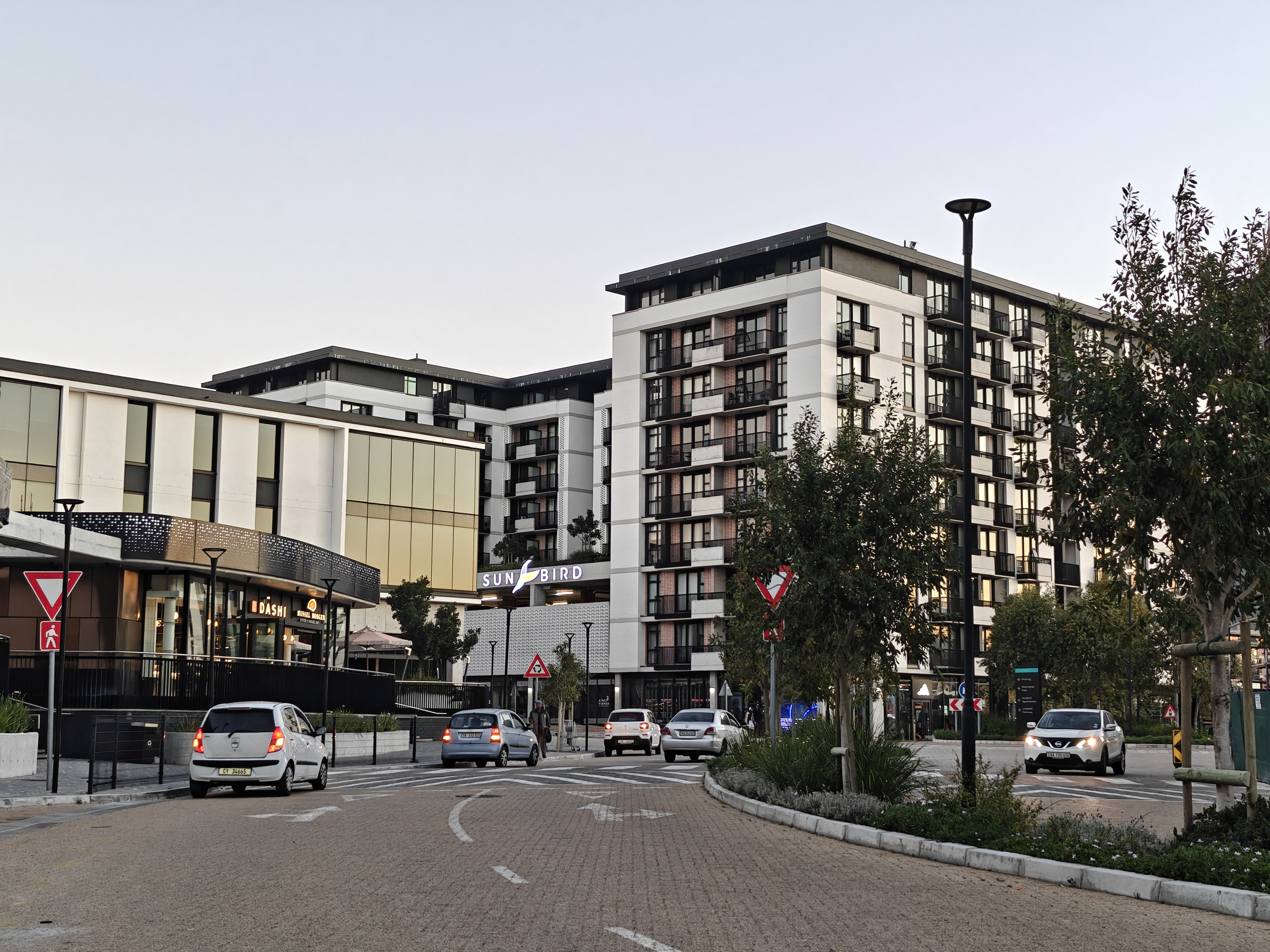
Sunbird condo building

In July 2026, all Sunbird (phase 1) condos had sold out, and sales were taking place for Kingfisher condos. Pricing for the latter ranged from R4 million to R6 million for 58m² to 65m² 2-bedroom units, and from R7.5 million to R8 million for 115m² to 116m² 3-bedroom units. Based on average home prices at the time, the pricing placed the condos solidly within the luxury real estate market in Cape Town.

== Location ==
The development is situated beside the Liesbeek River in the Cape Town suburb of Observatory. It is located close to the M5 highway.

Riverlands is located approximately 8 km from Century City, 8 km from Cape Town CBD, and 4 km from Pinelands.

The Riverlands precinct is served by the Malta and Gogosoa MyCiTi BRT system bus stops.

== Features ==
The Riverlands development comprises the following:

- Public green space, including a 2-hectare Eco Park
- A San and Khoi peoples heritage museum
- Sunbird condo buildings (North and South Towers)
- Kingfisher condo building
- Riverlands Mall
- Commercial office space (100,000 sqm), across five buildings
- Amazon Africa HQ

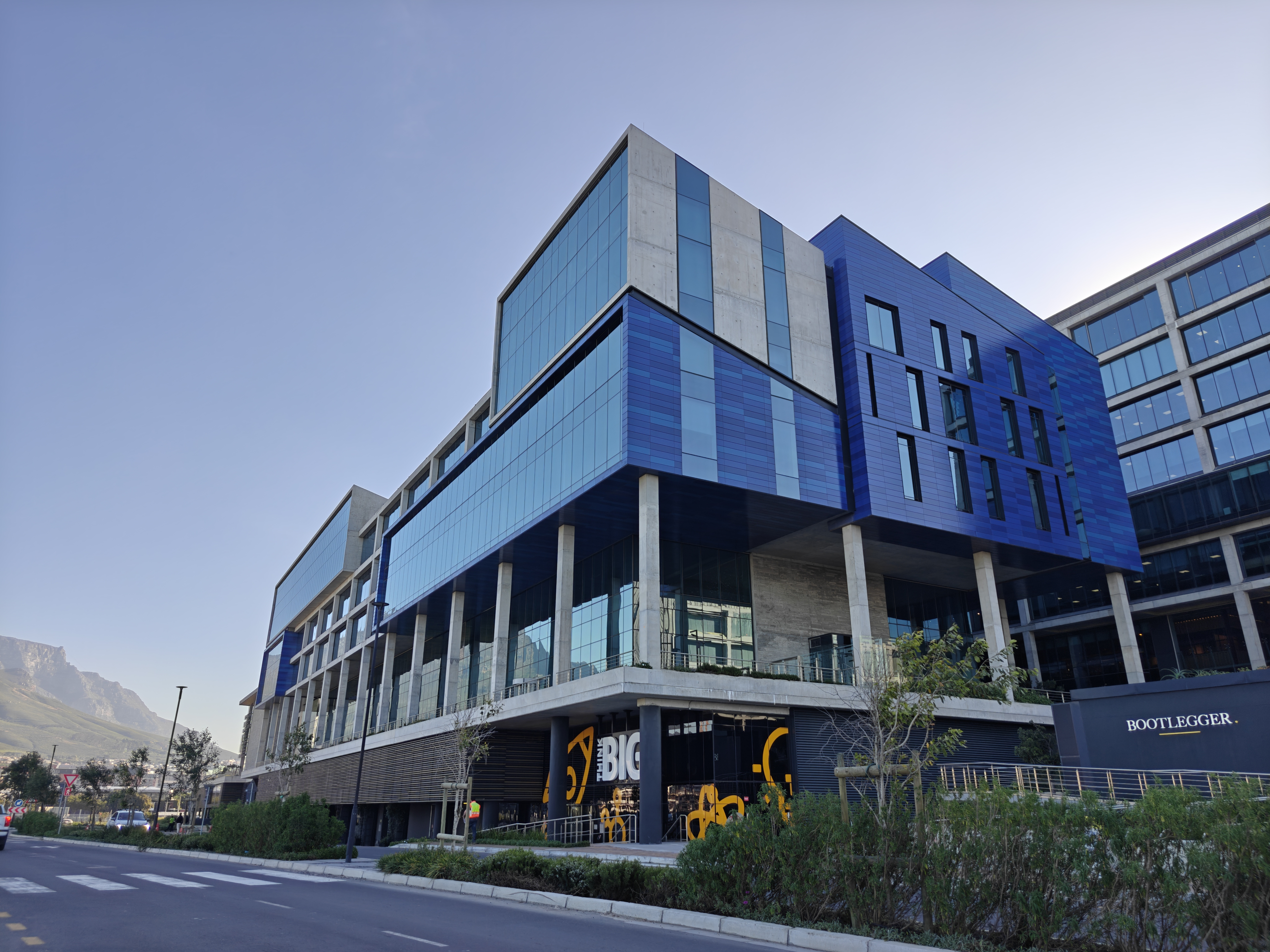
Amazon's Africa HQ

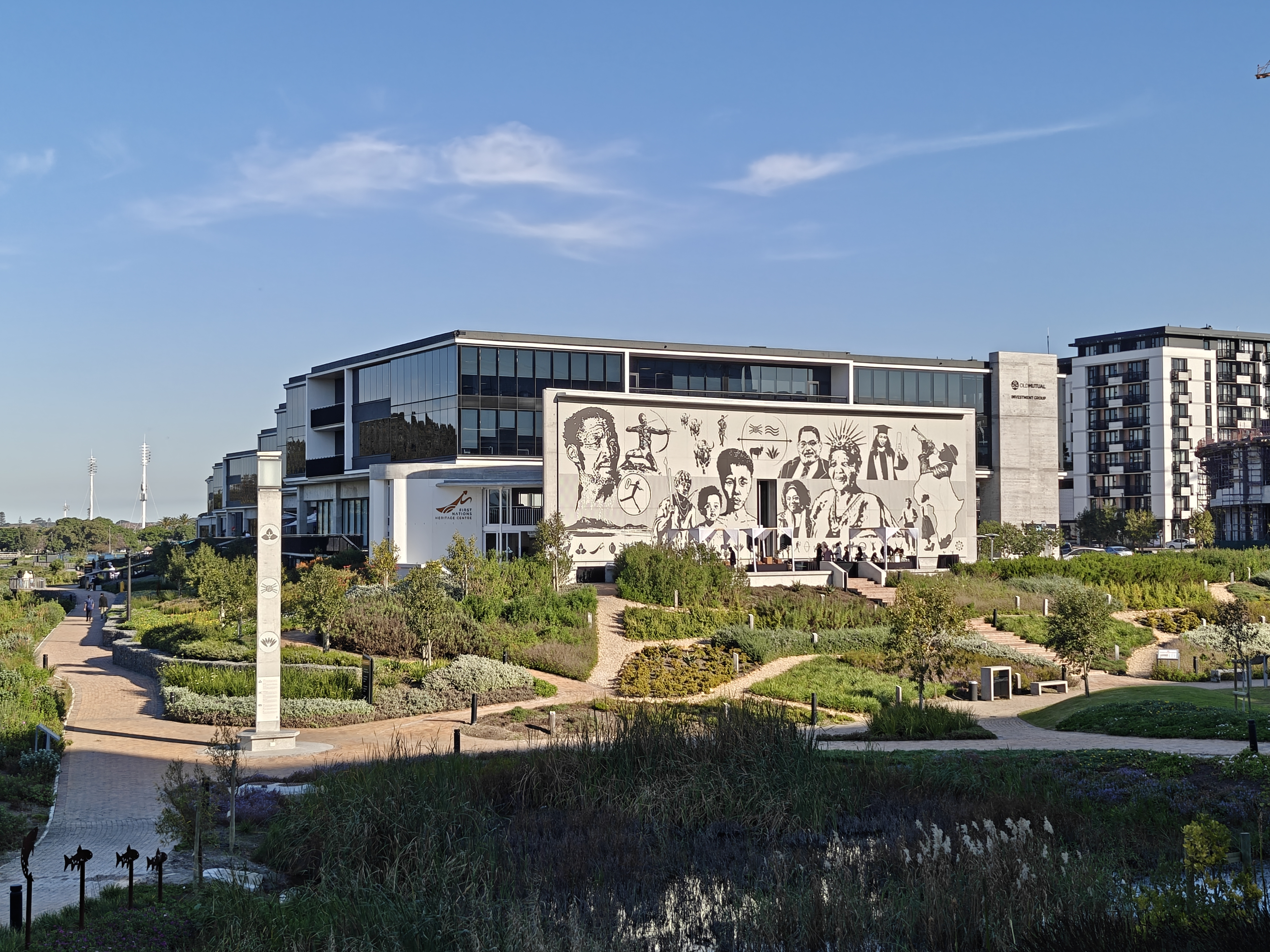
Heritage Center

=== Tenants ===
The African headquarters of American e-commerce company Amazon, including space for Amazon Web Services, is located inside the Riverlands development. The company employs 6,000 locals at the site.

Other tenants in the 5-building commercial office space portion of Riverlands, as of mid-2026, include Old Mutual, Venture Workspace, Yoyo, Syntax, Morton & Partners, Electrum, and Zenprop.

The Kingfisher condo building also includes a 3,500 m^{2} Virgin Active gym, across the two lowest floors.

== Biodiversity ==
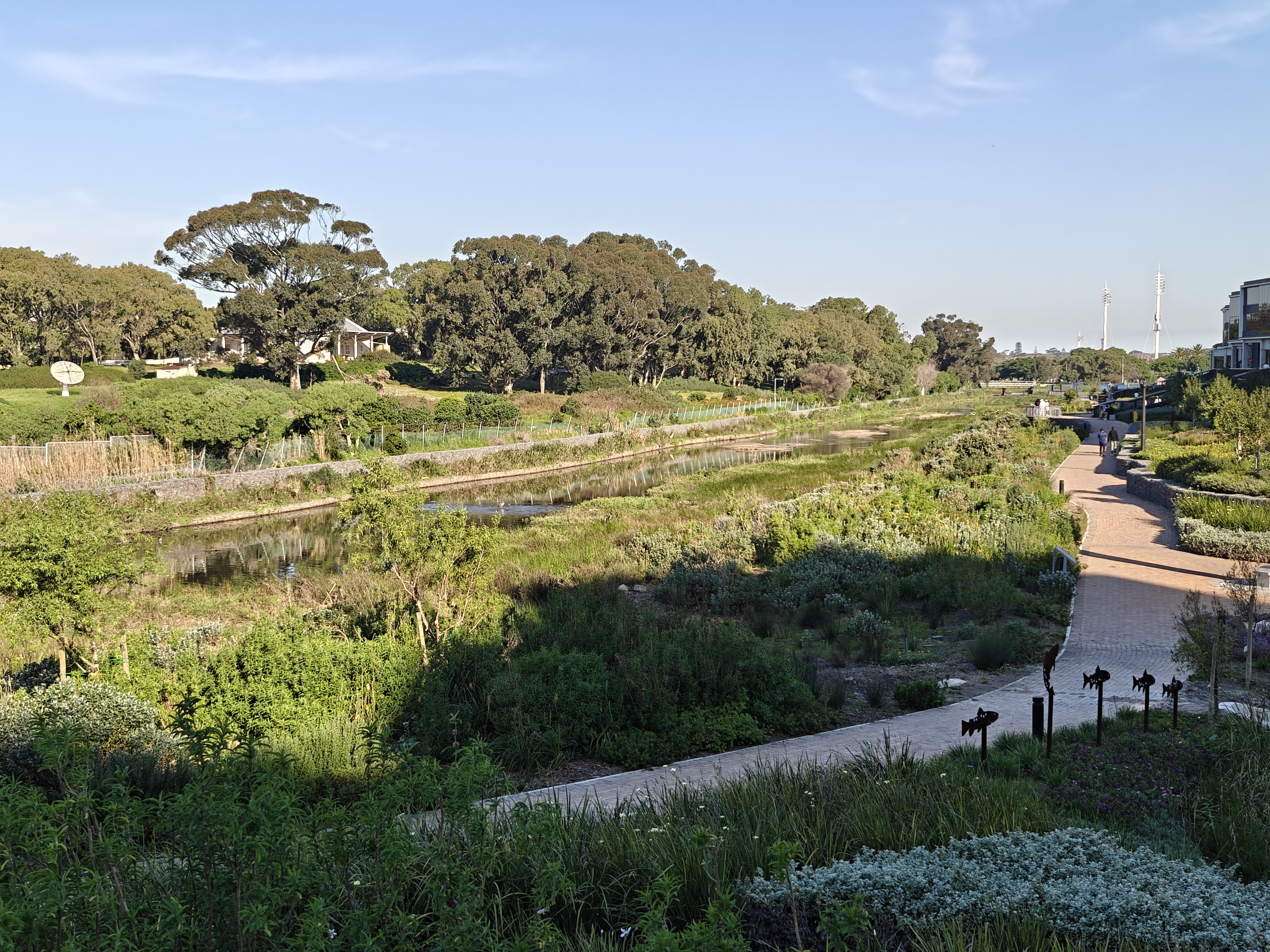
Part of Riverlands Eco Park

Riverlands includes a 2-hectare Eco Park and six kilometers of heritage walks, eco-trails, and running tracks. As part of its development, the Liesbeek River concrete canal was removed, and the area was restored to its natural riverine ecosystem.

Indigenous landscaping was part of the Riverlands development project, creating a habitat for endemic fauna, including the Western leopard toad, sunbird, grey heron, and malachite kingfisher.

Approximately 65% of the Riverlands precinct consists of open green space. Trails inside Riverlands connect to the nearby Liesbeek Trail, Raapenberg Wetlands, and other parts of the Two Rivers Urban Park.

Other wildlife found in the Eco Park include the Cape Clawless Otter, Cape Dwarf Chameleon, South African Helmeted Terrapin, African Spoonbill, Cape Shoveler, Common Sandpiper, Pied Kingfisher, and Yellow-Billed Duck.
