= WBHO =

South African construction company

- Type: Public
- Traded as: JSE: WBO
- ISIN: ZAE000009932
- Industry: Construction
- Founded: 1970; 56 years ago
- Founder: John Wilson; Brian Holmes
- Headquarters: Sandton, South Africa
- Area served: Africa; United Kingdom
- Key people: Louwtjie Nel (Chairman); Wolfgang Neff (CEO); Charles Henwood (CFO)
- Services: Building construction Civil engineering Roadworks; Earthworks
- Revenue: ▲ R27.52 billion (2024)
- Operating income: ▲ R1.24 billion (2024)
- Net income: ▲ R1.04 billion (2024)
- Total assets: ▲ R15.36 billion (2024)
- Total equity: ▲ R4.67 billion (2024)
- Number of employees: 9,498 (2024)
- Divisions: Building and Civil Engineering; Roads and Earthworks; Projects; Construction Materials
- Subsidiaries: The Byrne Group; Russell-WBHO
- Website: www.wbho.co.za

The Berg River Dam in Franschhoek

Cape Town Stadium from Lion's Head, Cape Town

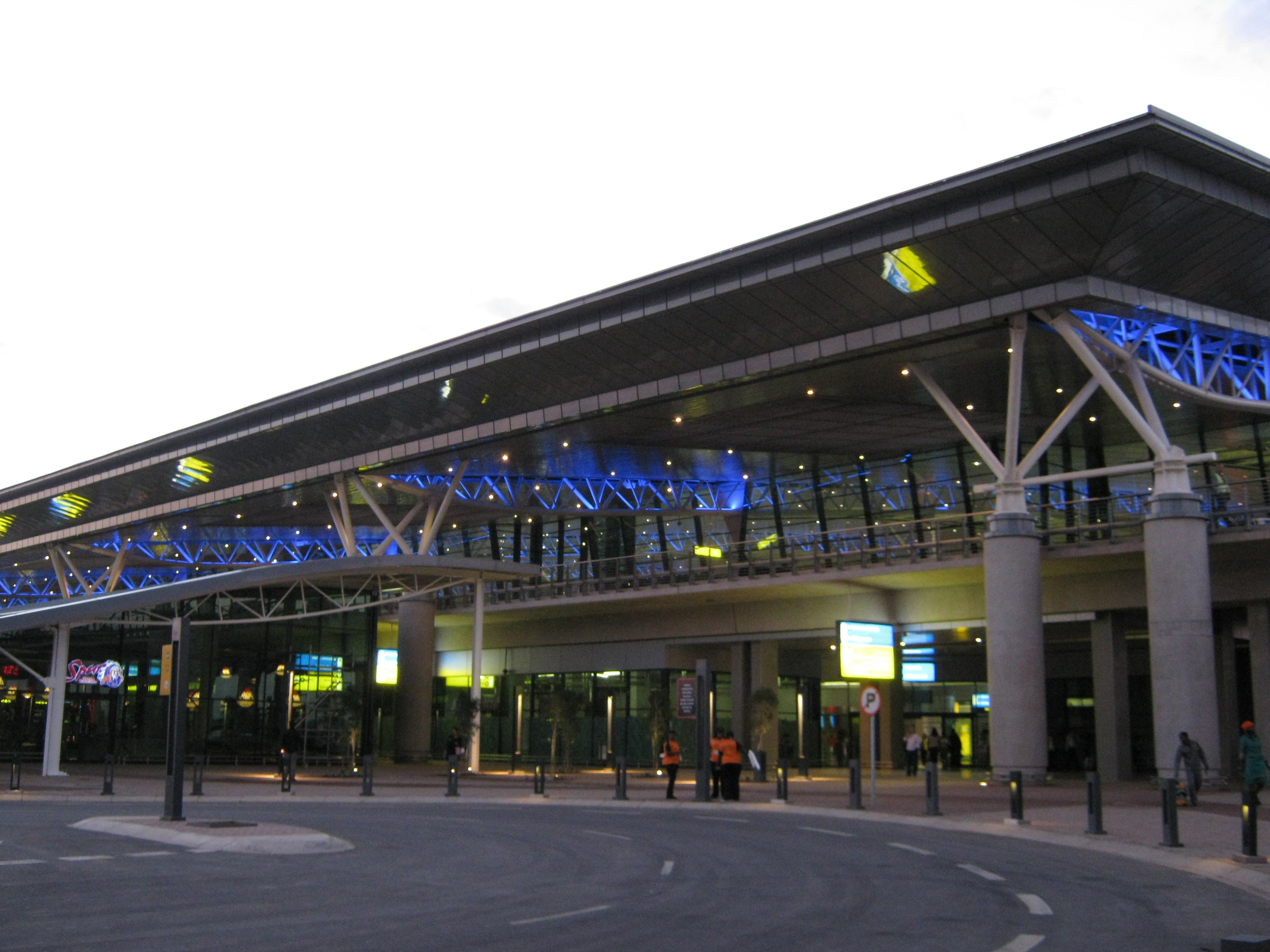
King Shaka International Airport passenger terminal in Durban

WBHO (officially Wilson Bayly Holmes - Ovcon Limited) is the largest construction company in South Africa, one of the largest in Southern Africa, and one of South Africa's largest companies by annual revenue.

The company focuses mainly on building construction, civil engineering, roads, and earthworks.

Founded in 1970, WBHO is headquartered in Sandton, and listed on the JSE Limited. It has operations in 12 countries, throughout Africa and in the United Kingdom, and employs around 10,000 people. WBHO is a Level 1 BBBEE contributor.

== History ==
WBHO was founded in 1970, by John Wilson and Brian Holmes, as Wilson-Holmes (Pty) Ltd. A number of mergers resulted in the name changing first to Wilson Bayly Holmes (Pty) Ltd, and then in 1996 to WBHO Construction.

In 2017, the company entered the UK market after it acquired a stake in the Byrne Group from the Byrne family. WBHO subsequently increased this to a majority shareholding in 2018.

Also in 2018, WBHO expanded into northern UK, through the acquisition of a majority shareholding in Russell Construction. Russell-WBHO, as the business is now known, is a Manchester-based building contractor that continues to be managed by the founding brothers; Gareth and Andrew Russell.

In October 2024, it was announced that WBHO's Chairman, Louwtjie Nel, would resign. He had been at the company since 1987. Charles Henwood, who served as WBHO's CFO, will become its new Chair.

In March 2025, WBHO stated that it was completing around R2.5 billion worth of work per month.

== Operations ==
WBHO operates across numerous construction and infrastructure maintenance sectors, under a number of brands, including:

- WBHO (construction in South Africa)
- Byrne Bros. (UK concrete frame contractor)
- Ellmer Construction (construction)
- O’Keefe (civil engineering)
- Russell WBHO (construction)
- Roadspan (roads surfacing in South Africa)
- Kalcon (construction, roads, and civil engineering in Botswana)
- Reinforcing & Mesh Solutions (reinforced steel and welded mesh supplier in Southern Africa)
- VSL Construction Solutions (post-tensioning, retained earth, and heavy lifting works)
- iKusasa Rail (rail track construction, electrification, and maintenance across Africa)
- The Gigajoule Group (investment in, development of, and operation of clean energy projects)

The company has offices in Cape Town, Durban, Gqeberha, Johannesburg, Gaborone, Accra, and Maputo. The majority of its revenue comes from Africa.

Its subsidiary, the Byrne Group, has its offices in London, and Russell-WBHO has offices in Manchester.

== Major projects ==
WBHO's flagship projects include:

- Mall of Africa
- Cape Town Stadium
- Port of Cape Town container berth deepening and quay refurbishment
- Moses Mabhida Stadium
- King Shaka International Airport
- Berg River Dam
- Kathu Solar Park
- Merak 2 and 3 Solar Projects
- Karusa and Soetwater Wind Farms
- Alice Lane Precinct
- Sasol Fine Ash Dam 6
- Gauteng Freeway Improvement Project
- Discovery headquarters in Sandton
- PwC headquarters (PwC Tower) in Midrand
- Ressano Garcia Gas Power Station
- Mbabane Bypass in eSwatini
- OR Tambo International Airport Central Terminal Building

Other WBHO projects include:

- Oceans Residential North Tower in uMhlanga
- Upgrading and realignment of the N3 freeway at the Key Ridge interchange in KwaZulu-Natal, for SANRAL
- Trilogy Apartments (Lizcobiz) in Tshwane
- 19 on Loop (Rubik) residential development in Cape Town
- JNB 11 Data Center
- Steyn City Center
- Pick n Pay Inland Distribution Center
- Menlyn Maine Central Square in Pretoria
- Oceans Mall in uMhlanga
- Ballito Junction Regional Mall in Ballito
- Cape Winelands Airport upgrade in the City of Cape Town

== Corporate social responsibility ==
In support of employee safety, WBHO has established a hierarchy of risk control and a set of actions to support health and safety interventions. High Risk Activity (HRA) champions monitor high risk construction sites. Separate to this, an observation system produces data for WBHO to improve safety procedures in future. All employees and subcontractors sign a WBHO Construction Safety Pledge.

The company is a member of the Green Building Council of South Africa. It has stated in annual reports that it is committed to sustainable business practices, and tracks these via an Environmental Management System (EMS).

The company supported 72 bursaries in 2023, and 50 bursaries in 2024, for a combined investment of R16.2 million.

WBHO reported in 2024 that it had maintained a Level 1 BBBEE rating for 8 consecutive years, and that around 82% of its South African workforce, and 32% of its board of directors, was black. The same report stated that 22% of its workforce, and 25% of its board, was female.

All WBHO timber is reportedly obtained from certified sources. Furthermore, WBHO has installed solar energy systems at numerous of its construction sites, for environmentally-friendly power generation. It has a net zero goal for 2038. The group is also a founding member and signatory of ConcreteZero, a joint initiative in the market for net zero concrete that is led by Climate Group, in partnership with World GBC.

The group tracks environmental data, to ensure it manages the control of substances hazardous to health (COSHH), applies sustainable sourcing and procurement practices, and develops Site Environmental Management Plans that address project-specific risks before commencement. WBHO also tracks construction impact on soil health, land degradation, cultural and historical heritage sites, and conservation areas.

WBHO's Akani Broad Based Incentive Share Scheme has a fund that actively supports qualifying employees in the areas of education, health, and housing.

== Awards ==
WBHO has been awarded the PMR Africa Diamond Arrow award for excellence numerous times. The award recognizes the promotion of economic growth and development.

In 2015, WBHO came first in the Diamond Arrow Construction Industry category. In the same year, WBHO Eastern Cape received the Provincial Survey Business Excellence Diamond Arrow award. WBHO received another Diamond Arrow award in 2017, in the Large Construction Firms category. In 2022, WBHO KwaZulu Natal received a Diamond Arrow award.

In 2023 and 2024, WBHO was awarded the PMR Africa Diamond Arrow award for excellence, placing first in the Construction Company category both times.

The company has also won numerous Master Builders Association (MBA) Regional Safety Awards.

== See also ==
- Construction industry in South Africa
