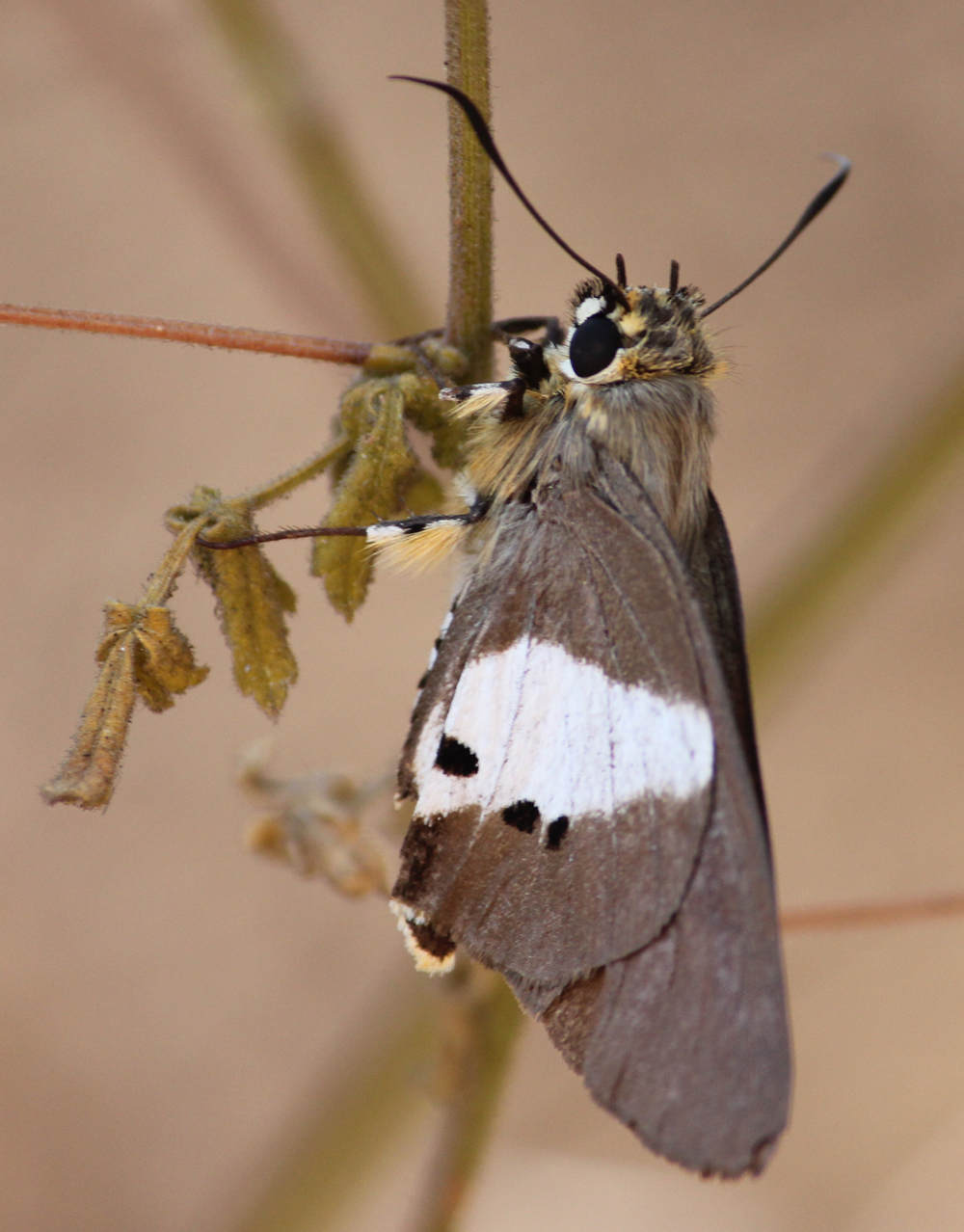
- Male C. pisistratus in the Soutpansberg

Scientific classification
- Kingdom: Animalia
- Phylum: Arthropoda
- Clade: Pancrustacea
- Class: Insecta
- Order: Lepidoptera
- Family: Hesperiidae
- Genus: Coeliades
- Species: C. pisistratus

Binomial name
- Coeliades pisistratus (Fabricius, 1793)

Synonyms
- Hesperia pisistratus Fabricius, 1793; Rhopalocampta valmaran Wallengren, 1857

= Coeliades pisistratus =

Two-pip policeman

Species of butterfly

Coeliades pisistratus, the two-pip policeman, is a butterfly of the family Hesperiidae that occurs commonly in much of sub-Saharan Africa.

== Habitat ==
It occurs in savanna, forest edge and in coastal bush. It is found from sea level in the south, up to 2,000 meters altitude in the tropics. It generally occupies mesic environments, being less tolerant of very dry or moist situations than C. forestan. Males are territorial.

== Range ==
It is found in Guinea-Bissau, Guinea, Sierra Leone, Liberia, Ivory Coast, Burkina Faso, Ghana, Togo, Benin, Nigeria, Cameroon, Equatorial Guinea, Gabon, Congo, CAR, Angola, DRC, South Sudan, Uganda, Rwanda, Burundi, Ethiopia, Somalia, Kenya, Tanzania, Malawi, Zambia, northern Namibia, Botswana, Zimbabwe, Mozambique, Eswatini and Lesotho, and the KwaZulu-Natal, Mpumalanga, Limpopo, Gauteng, Free State, Northern Cape and North West provinces of South Africa.

== Description and habits ==
The sexes are very similar. The female has a larger abdomen and more rounded wings. The wingspan is 55–65 mm for males and 63–70 mm for females. Adults are on the wing year-round in warmer areas with peaks September to April. During the larval stage of some 40 days, the larva will increasingly modify the leaf of its food plant for protection. It hatches from an egg laid on the tip of a new leaf, which soon after eclosion is folded into a shelter. Later instars combine two and later several leaves to form the shelter, which ultimately protects the month-long pupal stage.

Torben Larsen developed a species numbering system for his 2005 publication Butterflies of West Africa. This species is #1208. The 'Larsen' numbers have since been used with permission in A Sharp Eye on Butterflies of Ghana.

== Food plants ==
The larvae feed on a wide range of plants, including Sphedamnocarpus pruriens, Triaspis macropteron, Stephanotis (syn. Dregea), Indigofera, Marsdenia, Acridocarpus and Combretum species.
