= Hawaan Forest =

Forest in KwaZulu-Natal, South Africa

Coordinates: 29°42′28″S 31°05′33″E

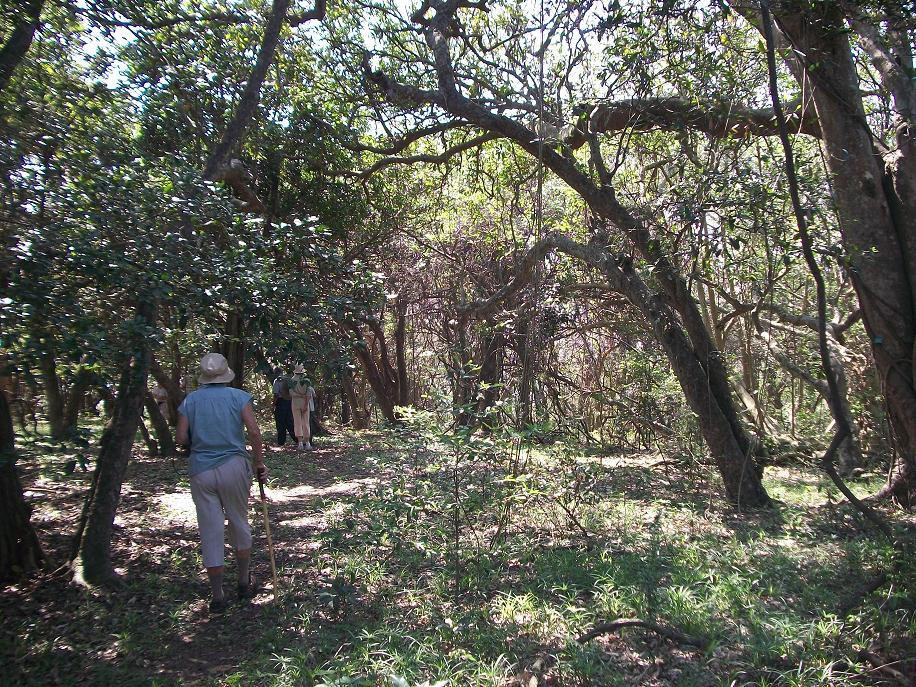
A view of Hawaan Forest

The Hawaan Forest is situated in Umhlanga, KwaZulu-Natal, South Africa. It is a large remnant of a climax dry coastal dune forest and the last of its kind. This forest grows on a dune that dates back 18,000 years. The Hawaan forest is currently under the guardianship of the Wildlife and Environment Society of Southern Africa (WESSA), but is owned by the Tongaat Hulett Group. The property was originally owned by the Campbell family who first settled there in 1859 and the Hawaan Forest has been protected since 1860. The Hawaan Forest Estate is known for being one of the most exclusive estates in the country.

== Etymology ==
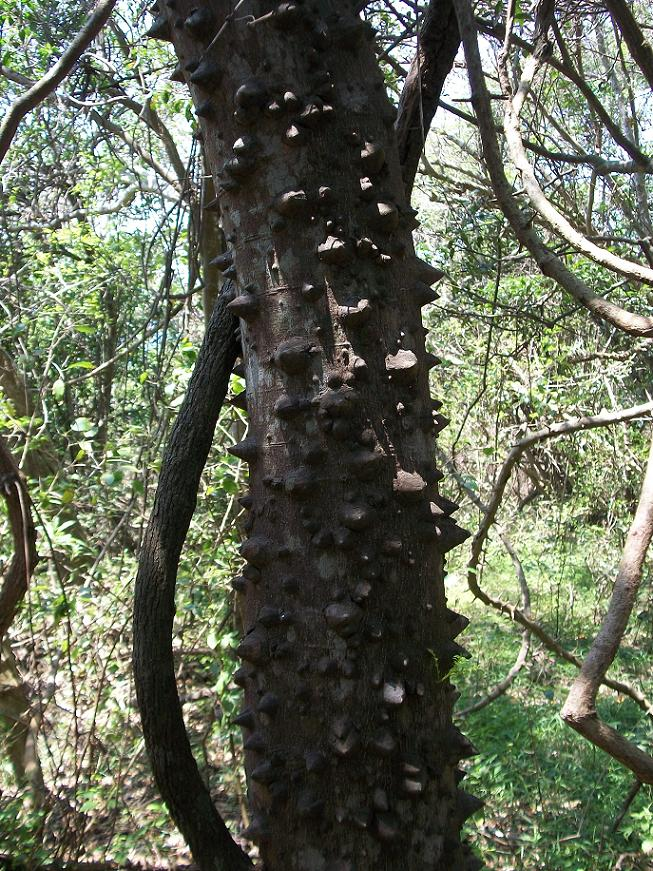
Stem of Xanthoxylum capense at Hawaan Forest

The origin of the name Hawaan is obscure. This is not an isiZulu word, and the closest words in isiZulu are hawe usually used as hawe ma and used as an exclamation of surprise or disappointment, and ihawu meaning "small shield". Neither of these words seem appropriate as an origin for the name Hawaan. It has been suggested that the name stems from indentured Indian labourers who were brought to South Africa to work on sugar-cane plantations. Much of the area surrounding Hawaan Forest was sugar-cane plantations, and it is thought that the Indian labourers who practiced Hinduism used the forest for religious ceremonies, particularly those associated with Havan. A Havan is a sacred purifying ritual in Hinduism that involves a fire ceremony and is a ritual of sacrifice made to the Fire god, Agni. The vessel used to perform the havan is called the Ôhavan kund. After the fire is lit in the Ôhavan kund, things such as fruits, honey and wooden goods are placed in the sacred fire. It is thought that the forest now known as the Hawaan Forest was a source of fruits, honey and wood to be used in the Havan ceremonies and that the forest was thus called Havan or Hawan, now Hawaan.

== Wildlife ==
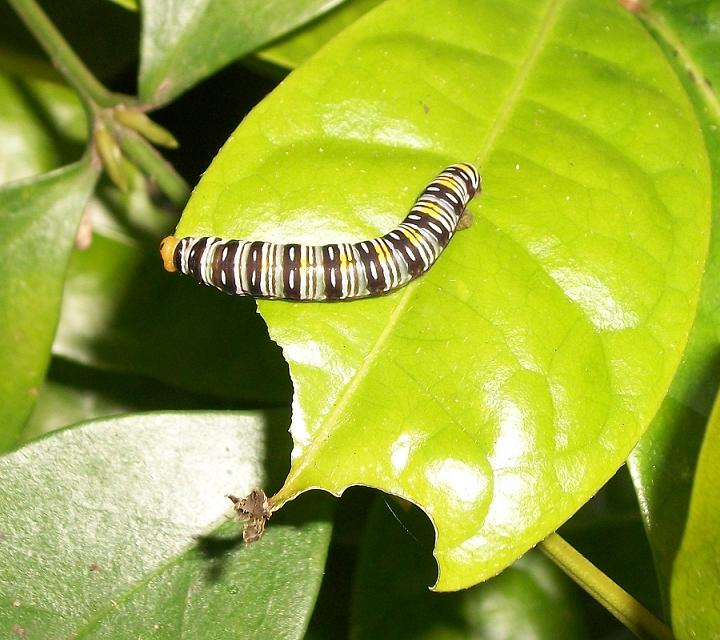
Larva of a Red-tab Policeman butterfly feeding on Acridocarpus natalitius at Hawaan Forest

The Hawaan Forest is home to various wildlife, the largest of which include; bushbuck, red duiker, blue duiker, bushpig, African rock python and crowned eagle. Other smaller species found here include the KwaZulu dwarf chameleon, coast purple tip butterfly, and the forest dwelling millipedes: Ulodesmus spiralipes, Centrolobus anulatus, Spinotarsus lobatus and Doratogonus cristulatus. Birds include the crested guineafowl and endangered spotted ground-thrush.

== Hawaan Forest Estate ==
The Hawaan Forest Estate covers 157 acres (64 ha) and has been meticulously planned and designed with the help of architect Stefan Antoni and indigenous gardener, Geoff Nichols, who has complemented this with his horticultural expertise and understanding of the neighbouring forest.

All properties are strategically placed, affording them corridor views towards forest and ocean, while gardening is strictly indigenous and homeowners have a list of 600 plants from which to choose when planting on each property. No pets are allowed on the estate, a necessary sacrifice to protect the birds and wildlife.

== See also ==
- Forests of KwaZulu-Natal
- Umhlanga Lagoon Nature Reserve
