= Coeliades lorenzo =

Lorenzo red-tab policeman

Scientific classification
- Domain: Eukaryota
- Kingdom: Animalia
- Phylum: Arthropoda
- Class: Insecta
- Order: Lepidoptera
- Family: Hesperiidae
- Genus: Coeliades
- Species: C. lorenzo

Binomial name
- Coeliades lorenzo Evans, 1947

Synonyms
- Coeliades keithloa r. lorenzo Evans, 1946

Species of butterfly

Coeliades lorenzo, the Lorenzo red-tab policeman, is a butterfly of the family Hesperiidae. It is found in South Africa in the Maputaland forests of northern KwaZulu-Natal, and northwards into Mozambique.

The wingspan is 58–64 mm for males and 61–66 mm for females. Adults are on the wing year-round in warmer areas with peaks in late summer and autumn.

The larvae feed on Acridocarpus natalitius.
