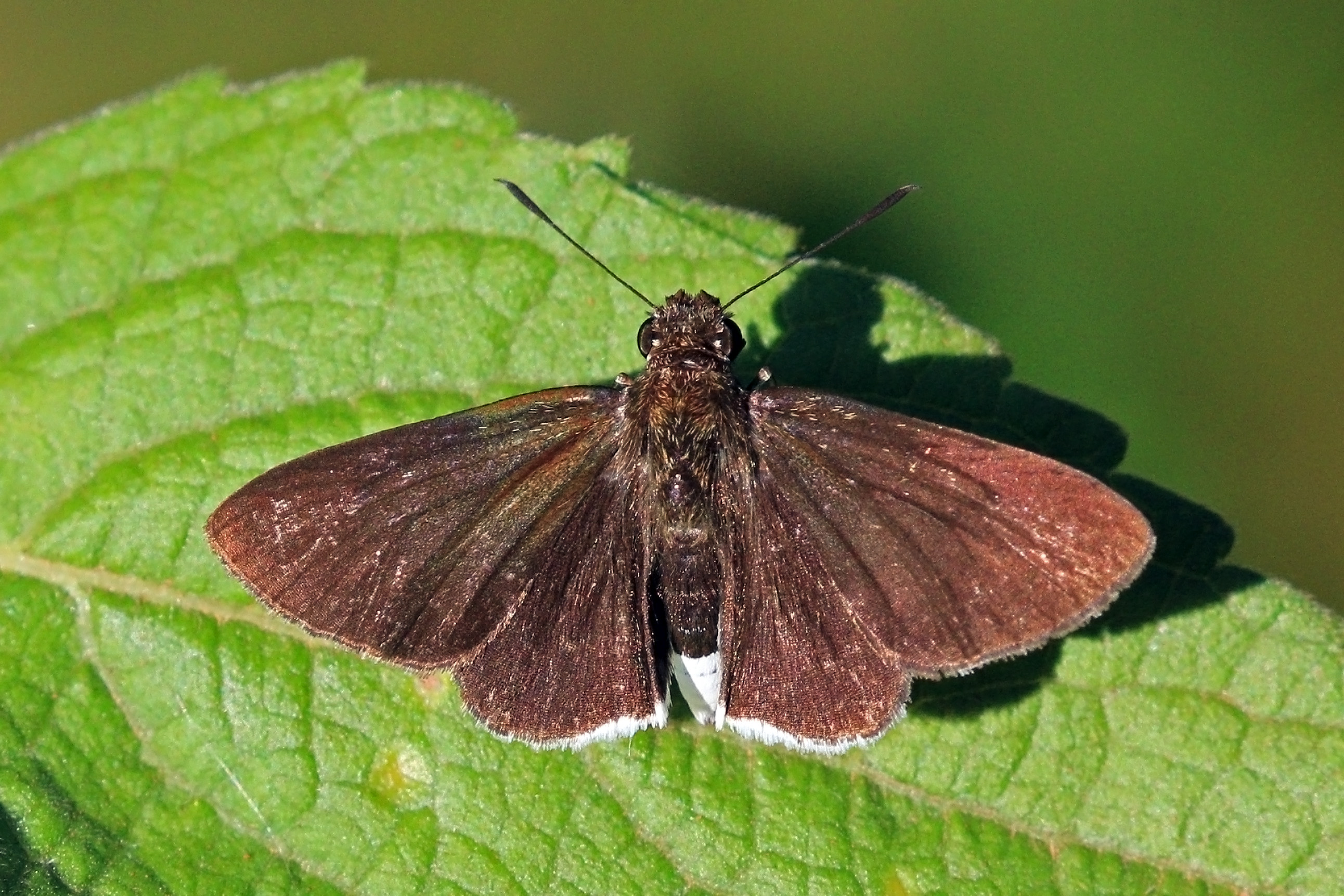
- A. m. instabilis Kakamega Forest, Kenya
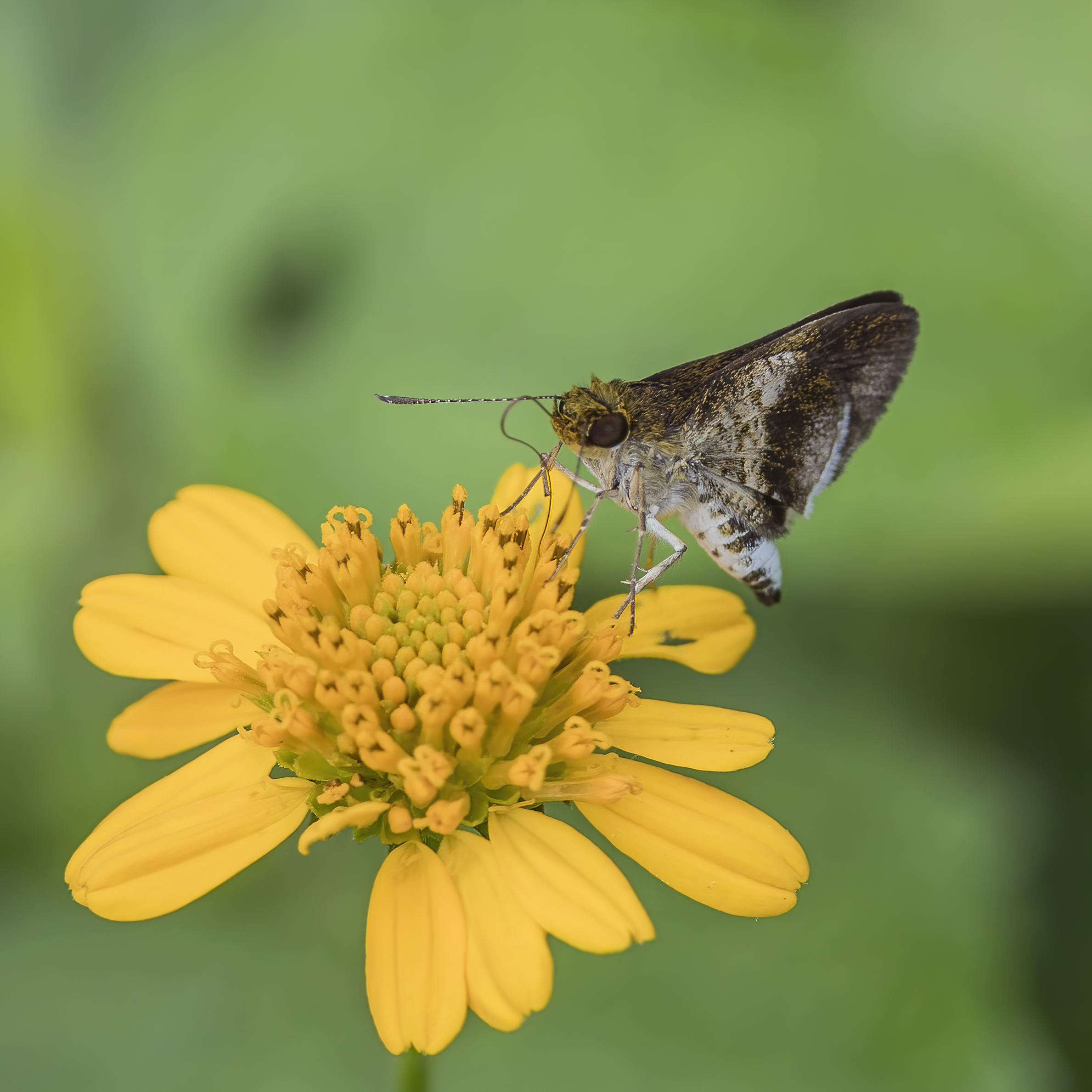
- male A. m. olaus Aburi Botanical Gardens, Ghana

Scientific classification
- Kingdom: Animalia
- Phylum: Arthropoda
- Clade: Pancrustacea
- Class: Insecta
- Order: Lepidoptera
- Family: Hesperiidae
- Genus: Acleros
- Species: A. mackenii

Binomial name
- Acleros mackenii (Trimen, 1868)

Synonyms
- Pamphila mackenii Trimen, 1868; Acleros nyassicola Strand, 1921; Acleros mackenii f. denia Evans, 1937; Apaustus olaus Plötz, 1884; Acleros instabilis Mabille, 1890

= Acleros mackenii =

Species of butterfly

Acleros mackenii, the Macken's skipper or Macken's dart, is a butterfly of the family Hesperiidae. It is found in Western, Eastern and Southern Africa.

The wingspan is 27–32 mm for males and 29–33 mm for females. Adults are on wing year-round but are more common in late summer, autumn and winter than in the hotter midsummer months.

The larvae feed on Rhus species (including Rhus corarius) and Acridocarpus species (including Acridocarpus smeathmanni).

== Subspecies ==
- Acleros mackenii mackenii (possibly Malawi, Zambia, Mozambique, Zimbabwe, Eswatini, South Africa: Limpopo Province, Mpumalanga, KwaZulu-Natal and the Eastern Cape Province)
- Acleros mackenii olaus (Plötz, 1884) (Guinea, Senegal, Sierra Leone, Liberia, Ivory Coast, Burkina Faso, Ghana, Togo, Nigeria, Cameroon, Central African Republic, Democratic Republic Congo, southern Sudan, Rwanda, Burundi)
- Acleros mackenii instabilis Mabille, 1890 (Democratic Republic of the Congo, Uganda, Kenya, Tanzania, Ethiopia)

Torben Larsen developed a species numbering system for his 2005 publication Butterflies of West Africa. The subspecies olaus is #1342. The 'Larsen' numbers have since been used with permission in A Sharp Eye on Butterflies of Ghana.

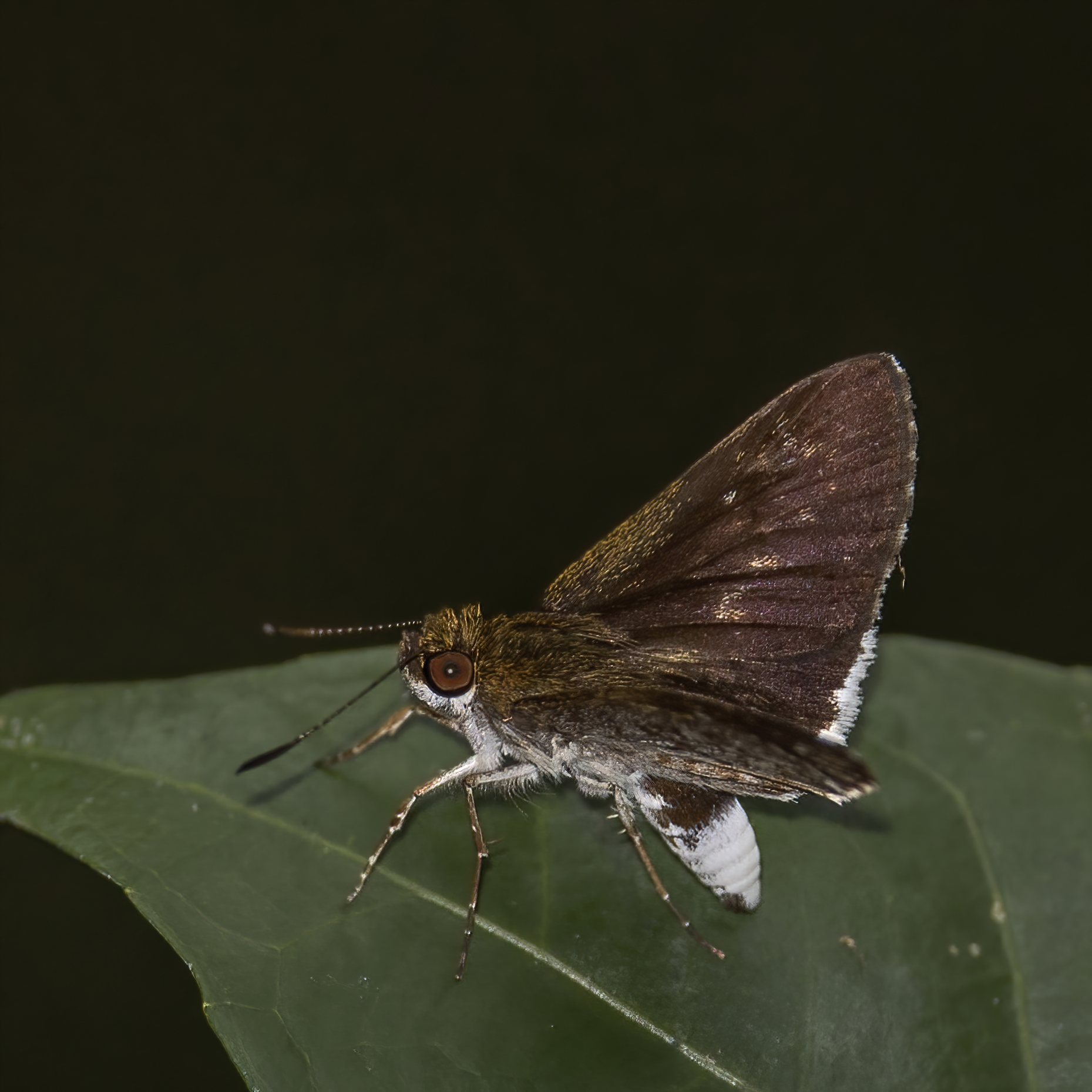
male A. m. olaus
