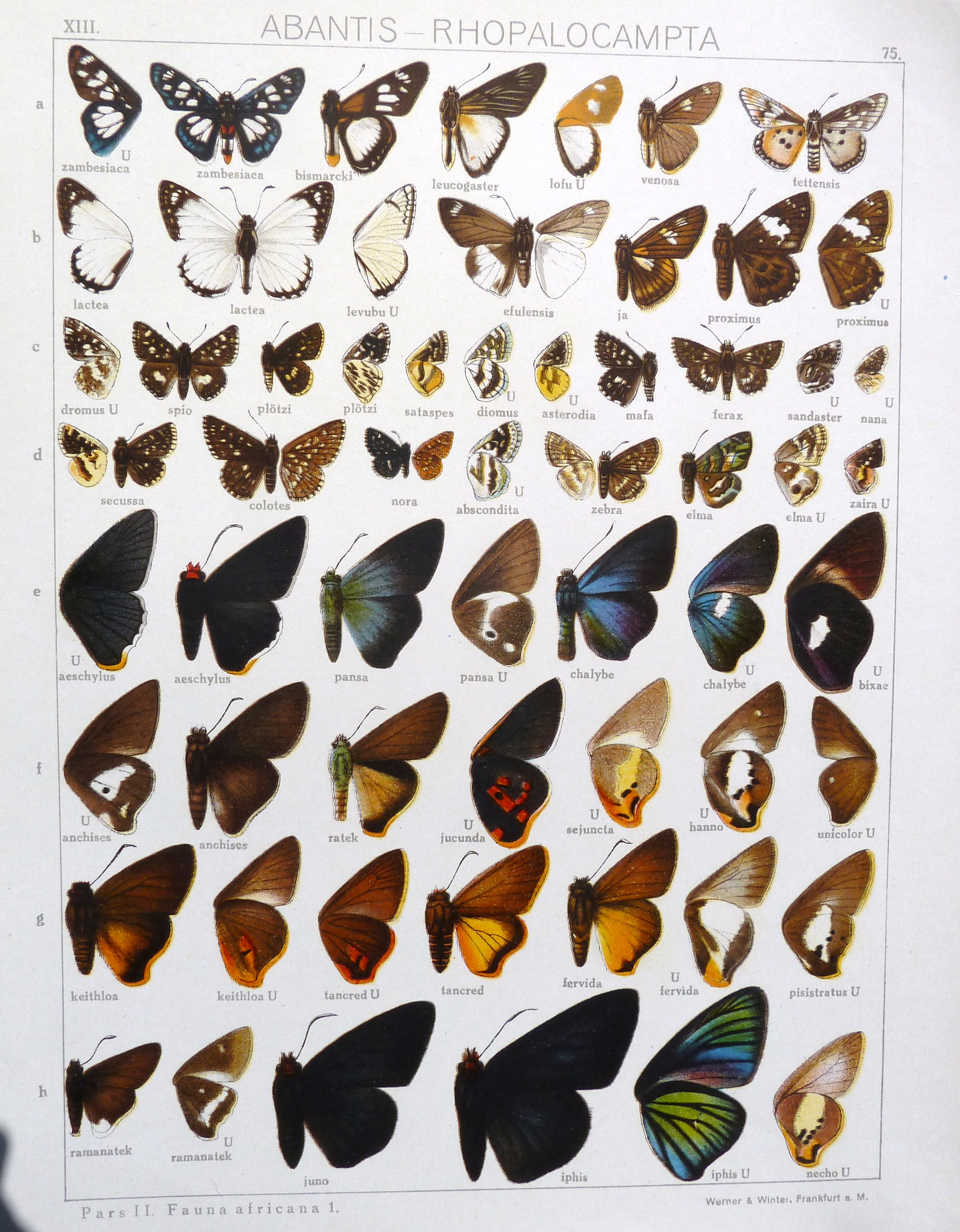

Scientific classification
- Domain: Eukaryota
- Kingdom: Animalia
- Phylum: Arthropoda
- Class: Insecta
- Order: Lepidoptera
- Family: Hesperiidae
- Genus: Coeliades
- Species: C. hanno

Binomial name
- Coeliades hanno (Plötz, 1879)

Synonyms
- Ismene hanno Plötz, 1879; Ismene necho Plötz, 1884; Rhopalocampta necho ab. tripunctata Aurivillius, 1925

= Coeliades hanno =

Species of butterfly

Coeliades hanno, the three pip policeman or western policeman, is a butterfly in the family Hesperiidae. It is found in Senegal, Guinea, Sierra Leone, Liberia, Ivory Coast, Ghana, Togo, Nigeria, Cameroon, Equatorial Guinea (Bioko), São Tomé, Gabon, the Republic of the Congo, the Central African Republic, Angola, the Democratic Republic of the Congo, Uganda, western Kenya, western Tanzania and Zambia. The habitat consists of forests and dense savanna.

Adults of both sexes are attracted to flowers and adult males also feed on bird droppings.

The larvae feed on Flabellaria paniculata and Acridocarpus species.
