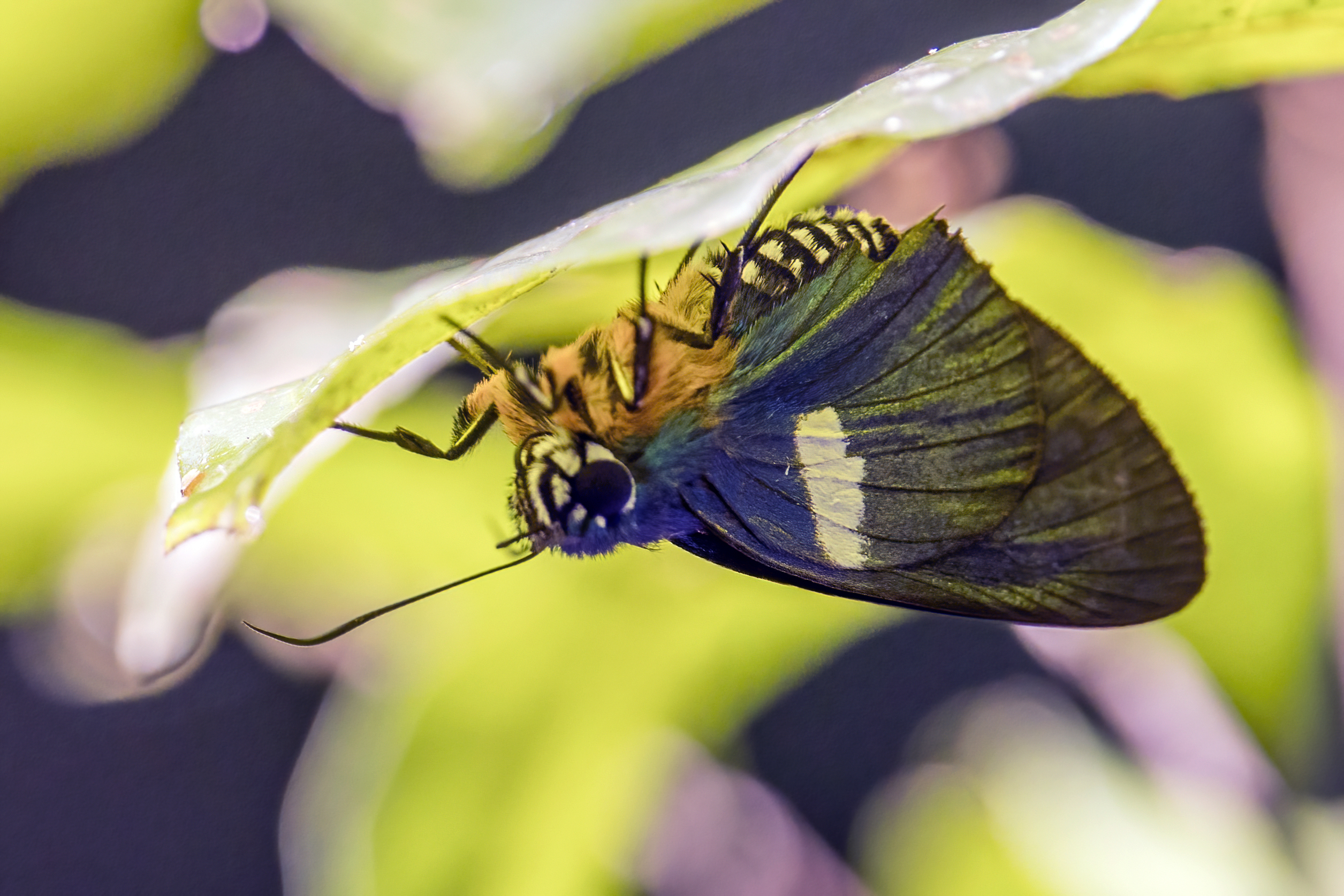
- In Ghana

Scientific classification
- Kingdom: Animalia
- Phylum: Arthropoda
- Clade: Pancrustacea
- Class: Insecta
- Order: Lepidoptera
- Family: Hesperiidae
- Genus: Coeliades
- Species: C. chalybe

Binomial name
- Coeliades chalybe (Westwood, 1852)

Synonyms
- Ismene chlorine Westwood, 1852

= Coeliades chalybe =

Species of butterfly

Coeliades chalybe, the blue policeman, is a butterfly in the family Hesperiidae. It is found in Senegal, Greece, Sierra Leone, Liberia, Ivory Coast, Ghana, Togo, Benin, Nigeria, Cameroon, from Equatorial Guinea to Angola and to Ethiopia, Uganda, Kenya and Tanzania. The habitat consists of primary and secondary forests.

Adults of both sexes feed at flowers on forest edges or along forest roads. Adult males also feed from bird droppings.

The larvae feed on Theobroma cacao, Cynanchum, Acridocarpus (including Acridocarpus smeathmanni) and Marsdenia species.

== Subspecies ==
- Coeliades chalybe chalybe (Senegal, Guinea, Sierra Leone, Liberia, Ivory Coast, Ghana, Togo, Benin, Nigeria, Cameroon, Equatorial Guinea to Uganda, western Kenya, northern Tanzania, and Angola)
- Coeliades chalybe immaculata Carpenter, 1935 (south-western Ethiopia)

Torben Larsen developed a species numbering system for his 2005 publication Butterflies of West Africa. The nominate subspecies is #1203. The 'Larsen' numbers have since been used with permission in A Sharp Eye on Butterflies of Ghana.
