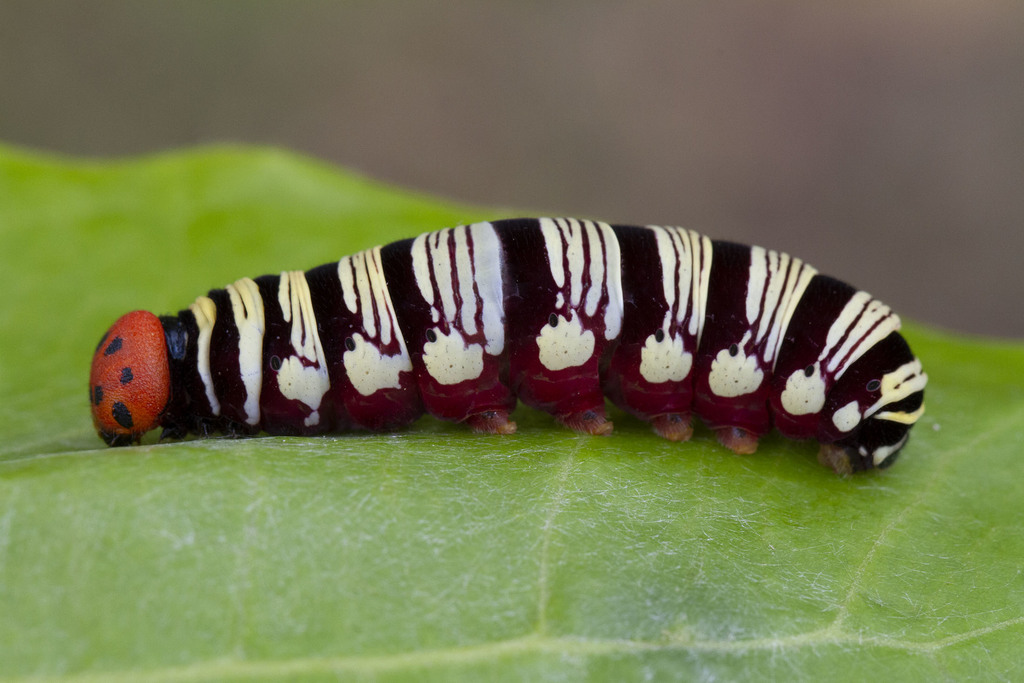

Scientific classification
- Domain: Eukaryota
- Kingdom: Animalia
- Phylum: Arthropoda
- Class: Insecta
- Order: Lepidoptera
- Family: Hesperiidae
- Genus: Coeliades
- Species: C. rama

Binomial name
- Coeliades rama Evans, 1937

= Coeliades rama =

Species of butterfly

Coeliades rama is a butterfly in the family Hesperiidae. It is found in Madagascar. Its habitat consists of forests, forest margins, and anthropogenic environments.
