= Acridocarpus socotranus =

Conservation status
- Least Concern (IUCN 3.1)

Scientific classification
- Kingdom: Plantae
- Clade: Tracheophytes
- Clade: Angiosperms
- Clade: Eudicots
- Clade: Rosids
- Order: Malpighiales
- Family: Malpighiaceae
- Genus: Acridocarpus
- Species: A. socotranus

Binomial name
- Acridocarpus socotranus Oliv.

Species of flowering plant

Acridocarpus socotranus is a species of plant in the family Malpighiaceae. It is endemic to Socotra, an archipelago which is part of Yemen. It occurs in woodlands, thickets, and succulent shrubland habitat, where it is a common species.

The plant is a shrub or small tree with leathery leaves, yellow flowers, and winged fruits.
