= Acleros nigrapex =

Powdered dusky skipper

Scientific classification
- Domain: Eukaryota
- Kingdom: Animalia
- Phylum: Arthropoda
- Class: Insecta
- Order: Lepidoptera
- Family: Hesperiidae
- Genus: Acleros
- Species: A. nigrapex

Binomial name
- Acleros nigrapex Strand, 1913

Synonyms
- Acleros pulverana Strand, 1913; Acleros minusculus Rebel, 1914

Species of butterfly

Acleros nigrapex, the powdered dusky skipper, is a butterfly in the family Hesperiidae. It is found in Liberia, Ivory Coast, Ghana, Nigeria, Cameroon, the Central African Republic, the Democratic Republic of the Congo, Uganda and north-western Tanzania. The habitat consists of forests.
