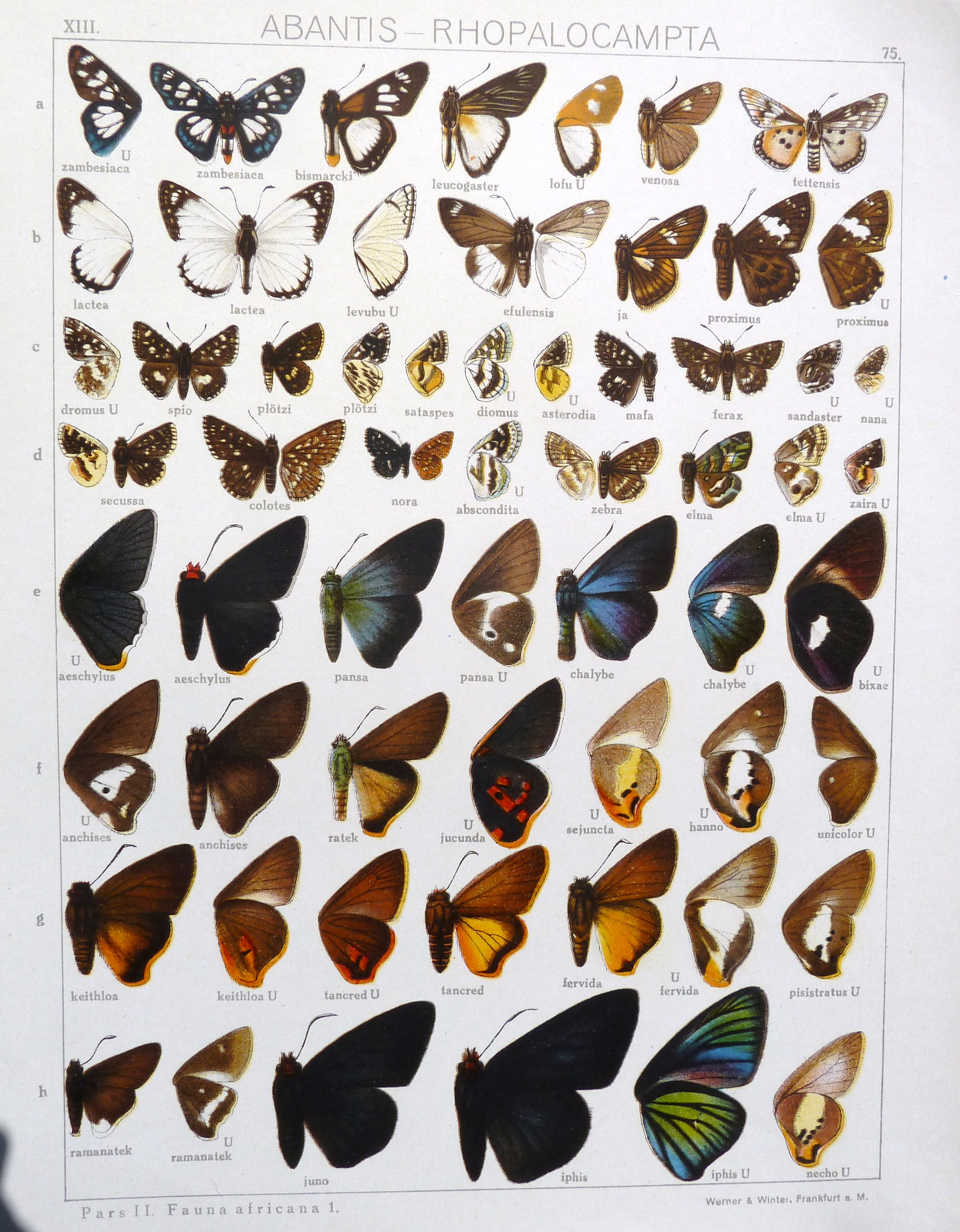

Scientific classification
- Domain: Eukaryota
- Kingdom: Animalia
- Phylum: Arthropoda
- Class: Insecta
- Order: Lepidoptera
- Family: Hesperiidae
- Genus: Coeliades
- Species: C. ramanatek

Binomial name
- Coeliades ramanatek (Boisduval, 1833)

Synonyms
- Thymele ramanatek Boisduval, 1833

= Coeliades ramanatek =

Species of butterfly

Coeliades ramanatek is a butterfly in the family Hesperiidae. It is found on Madagascar and the Comoros. The habitat consists of forests, forest margins and anthropogenic environments.

== Subspecies ==
- Coeliades ramanatek ramanatek (Madagascar)
- Coeliades ramanatek comorana Evans, 1937 (Comoros)
