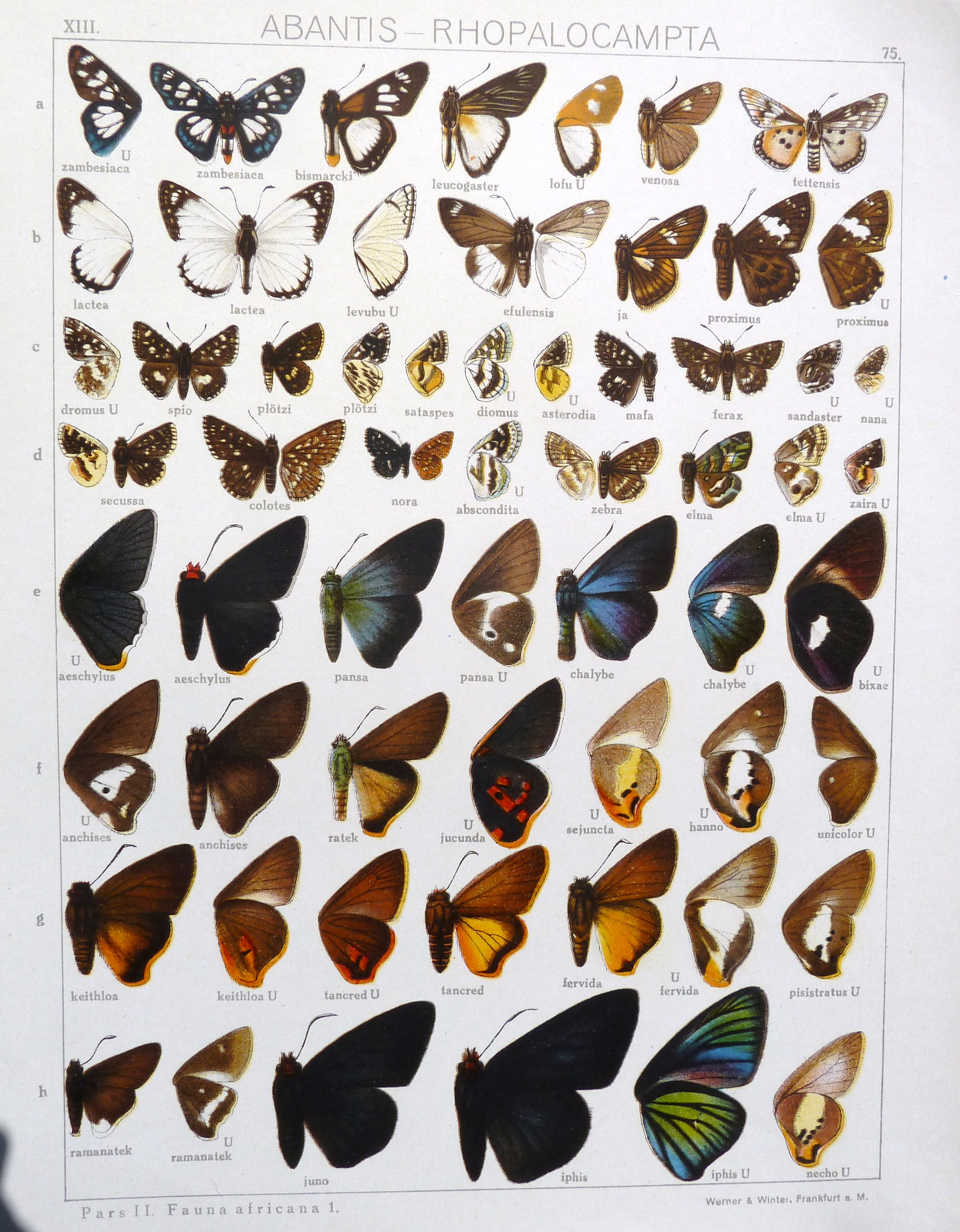

Scientific classification
- Domain: Eukaryota
- Kingdom: Animalia
- Phylum: Arthropoda
- Class: Insecta
- Order: Lepidoptera
- Family: Hesperiidae
- Genus: Coeliades
- Species: C. sejuncta

Binomial name
- Coeliades sejuncta (Mabille & Vuillot, 1891)

Synonyms
- Ismene sejuncta Mabille & Vuillot, 1891

= Coeliades sejuncta =

Species of butterfly

Coeliades sejuncta, the coast policeman or ochreous-banded policeman, is a butterfly in the family Hesperiidae. It is found along the coast of Kenya and in Tanzania (from the coast inland to Amani and also in the Kigoma district), southern Malawi, Zambia and Zimbabwe. Its habitat consists of forests, coastal forests, riverine forests, and dense bush.

Adults are attracted to flowers, including Maerua species

The larvae feed on Acridocarpus zanzibaricum.
