= Coeliades bocagii =

Scientific classification
- Kingdom: Animalia
- Phylum: Arthropoda
- Class: Insecta
- Order: Lepidoptera
- Family: Hesperiidae
- Genus: Coeliades
- Species: C. bocagii

Binomial name
- Coeliades bocagii (Sharpe, 1893)

Synonyms
- Rhopalocampta bocagii Sharpe, 1893

Species of butterfly

Coeliades bocagii is a butterfly in the family Hesperiidae. It is found on Sao Tome and Principe.
