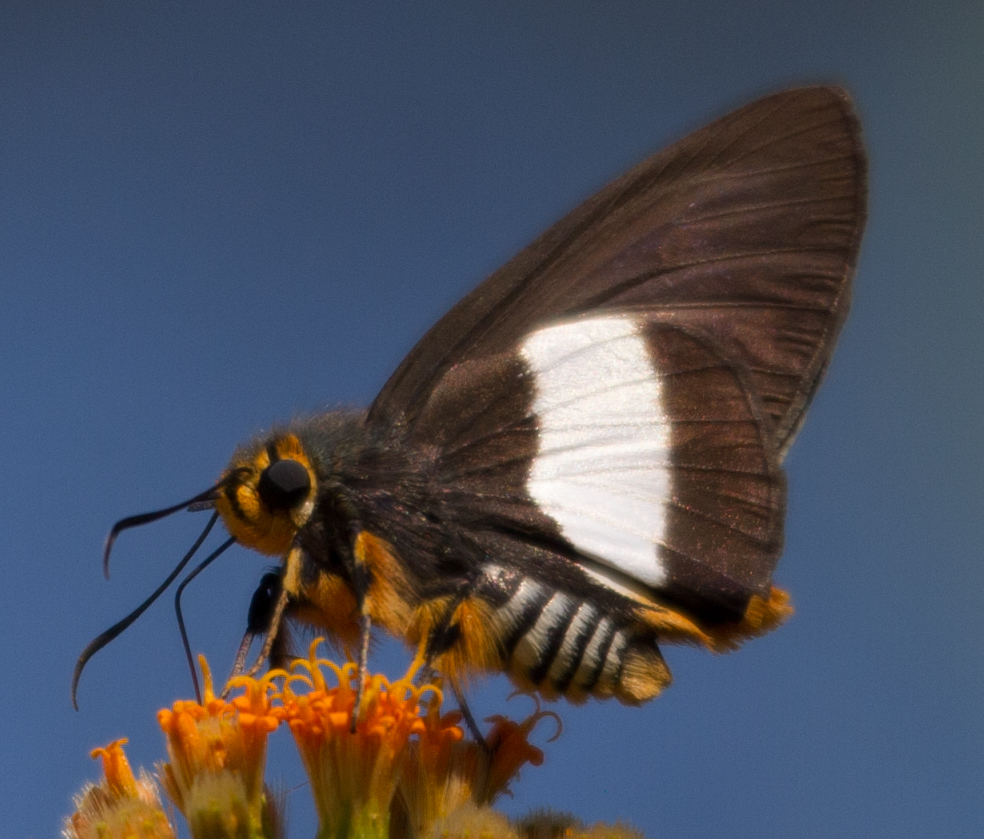
- Coeliades forestan

Scientific classification
- Kingdom: Animalia
- Phylum: Arthropoda
- Clade: Pancrustacea
- Class: Insecta
- Order: Lepidoptera
- Family: Hesperiidae
- Subfamily: Coeliadinae
- Genus: Coeliades; Hübner, 1818

Species
- see text

Synonyms
- Rhopalocampta Wallengren, 1857

= Coeliades =

Genus of butterflies

Coeliades is a genus of large skipper butterflies (family Hesperiidae) found in Subsaharan Africa. They are commonly known as policemen.

== Species ==
Listed alphabetically.

- Coeliades aeschylus (Plötz, 1884) – Senegal blue policeman
- Coeliades anchises (Gerstaecker, 1871) – one pip policeman
- Coeliades bixana Evans, 1940 – dark blue policeman
- Coeliades bocagii (Sharpe, 1893)
- Coeliades chalybe (Westwood, 1852) – blue policeman
- Coeliades ernesti (Grandidier, 1867)
- Coeliades fervida (Butler, 1880)
- Coeliades fidia Evans, 1937
- Coeliades forestan (Stoll, [1782]) – striped policeman
- Coeliades iphis (Drury, 1773) (transfer from monotypic Pyrrhochalcia, per Zhang et al 2023).
- Coeliades hanno (Plötz, 1879) – western policeman, three pip policeman
- Coeliades keithloa (Wallengren, 1857) – red tab policeman
- Coeliades libeon (Druce, 1875) – spotless policeman
- Coeliades lorenzo Evans, 1947 – Lorenzo red tab policeman
- Coeliades pisistratus (Fabricius, 1793) – two pip policeman
- Coeliades rama Evans, 1937
- Coeliades ramanatek (Boisduval, 1833)
- Coeliades sejuncta (Mabille & Vuillot, 1891) – coast policeman, ochreous-banded policeman
