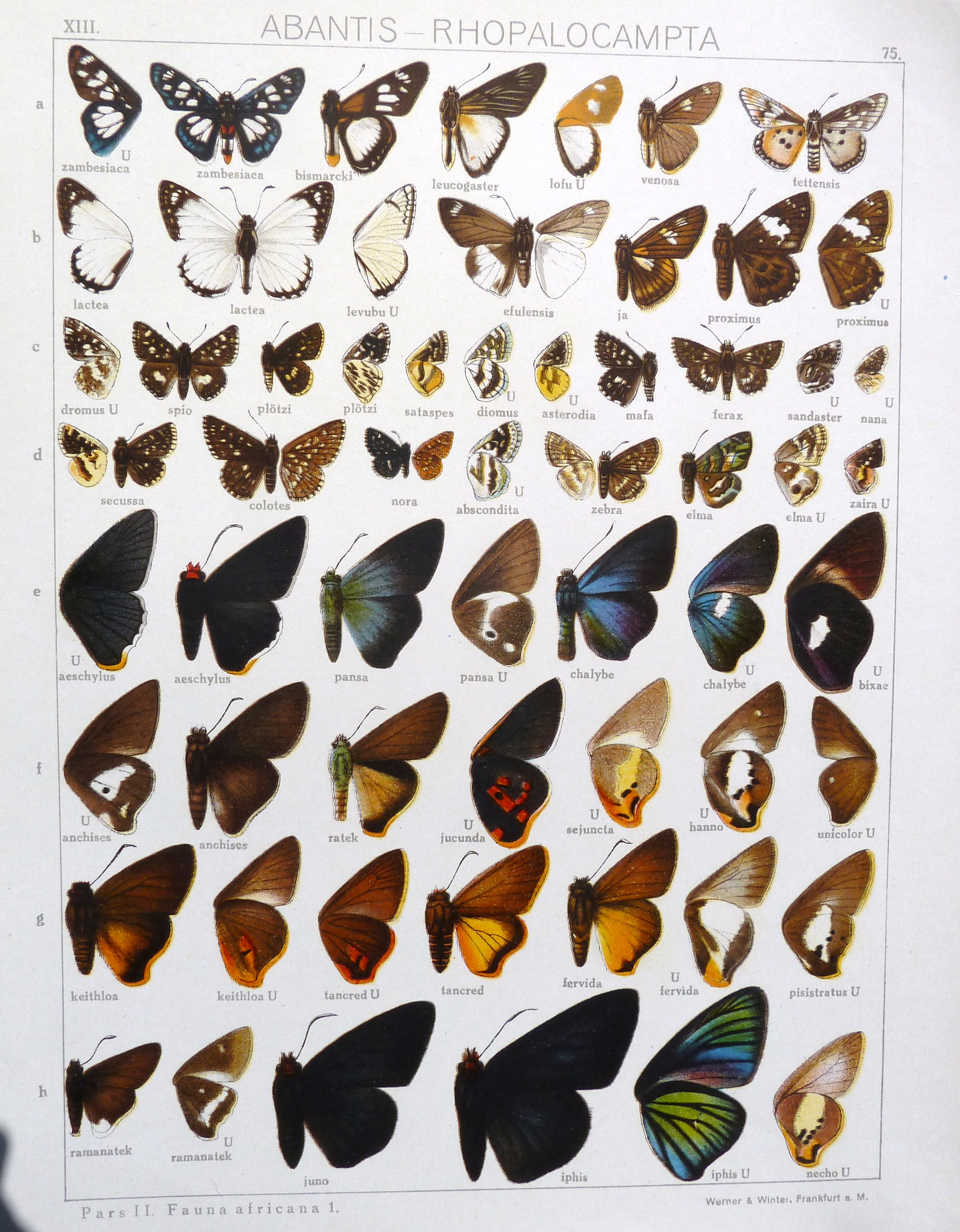

Scientific classification
- Kingdom: Animalia
- Phylum: Arthropoda
- Clade: Pancrustacea
- Class: Insecta
- Order: Lepidoptera
- Family: Hesperiidae
- Genus: Coeliades
- Species: C. libeon

Binomial name
- Coeliades libeon (H. Druce, 1875)

Synonyms
- Ismene libeon H. Druce, 1875; Ismene unicolor Mabille, 1877; Ismene andonginis Plötz, 1884; Ismene brussauxi Mabille, 1891

= Coeliades libeon =

Species of butterfly

Coeliades libeon, the spotless policeman, is a butterfly of the family Hesperiidae. The species was first described by Herbert Druce in 1875. It is found in tropical Africa, Mozambique, Zimbabwe and is an uncommon migrant to South Africa.

The wingspan is 45–52 mm for males and 50–55 mm for females. Adults are on wing from October to May in southern Africa and in the winter in subtropical areas.

The larvae feed on Drypetes (including Drypetes gerrardii), Cassia and Millettia species.

Torben Larsen developed a species numbering system for his 2005 publication Butterflies of West Africa. This species is #1206. The 'Larsen' numbers have since been used with permission in A Sharp Eye on Butterflies of Ghana.
