= Acleros neavei =

Scientific classification
- Domain: Eukaryota
- Kingdom: Animalia
- Phylum: Arthropoda
- Class: Insecta
- Order: Lepidoptera
- Family: Hesperiidae
- Genus: Acleros
- Species: A. neavei

Binomial name
- Acleros neavei Evans, 1937

Species of butterfly

Acleros neavei is a butterfly in the family Hesperiidae. It is found in Uganda, the Democratic Republic of the Congo (from the eastern part of the country to the Ituri District) and Tanzania (the eastern shore of Lake Tanganyika).
