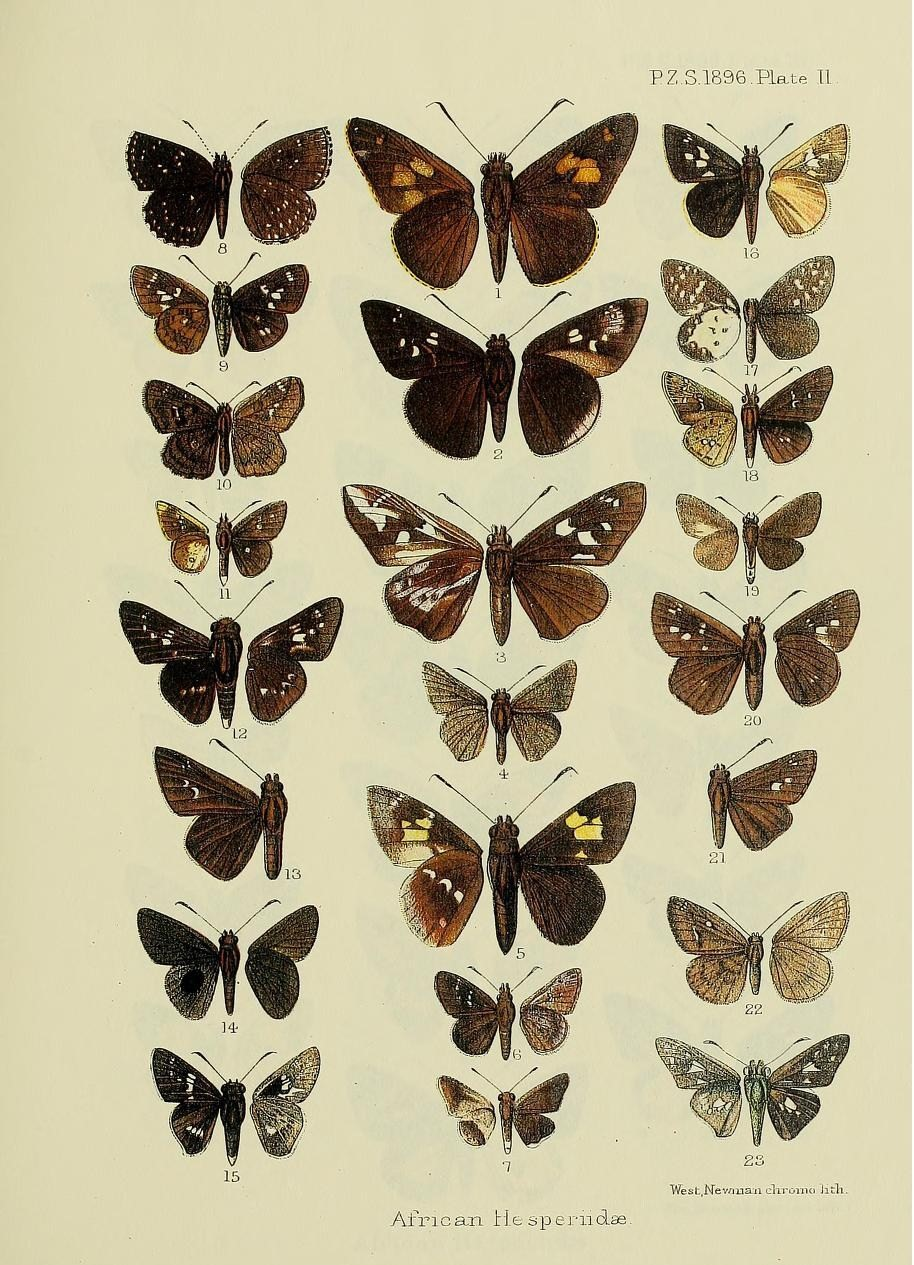
- Acleros ploetzi figure 7

Scientific classification
- Kingdom: Animalia
- Phylum: Arthropoda
- Clade: Pancrustacea
- Class: Insecta
- Order: Lepidoptera
- Family: Hesperiidae
- Genus: Acleros
- Species: A. ploetzi

Binomial name
- Acleros ploetzi Mabille, 1890

Synonyms
- Apaustus leucopygus Plötz, 1879

= Acleros ploetzi =

Species of butterfly

Acleros ploetzi, the Ploetz's dart or Ploetz's dusky skipper, is a butterfly in the family Hesperiidae. It is found in Senegal, the Gambia, Guinea-Bissau, Guinea, Sierra Leone, Liberia, Ivory Coast, Ghana, Nigeria, Cameroon, Gabon, the Republic of the Congo, the Democratic Republic of the Congo, Uganda, western Kenya and along the coast, Tanzania, Malawi, Zambia, Mozambique and eastern Zimbabwe. The habitat consists of forests, including secondary growth.

Adults are on wing from July to August and again from February to May.

The larvae feed on Vigna unguiculata.

Torben Larsen developed a species numbering system for his 2005 publication Butterflies of West Africa. This species is #1341. The 'Larsen' numbers have since been used with permission in A Sharp Eye on Butterflies of Ghana.
