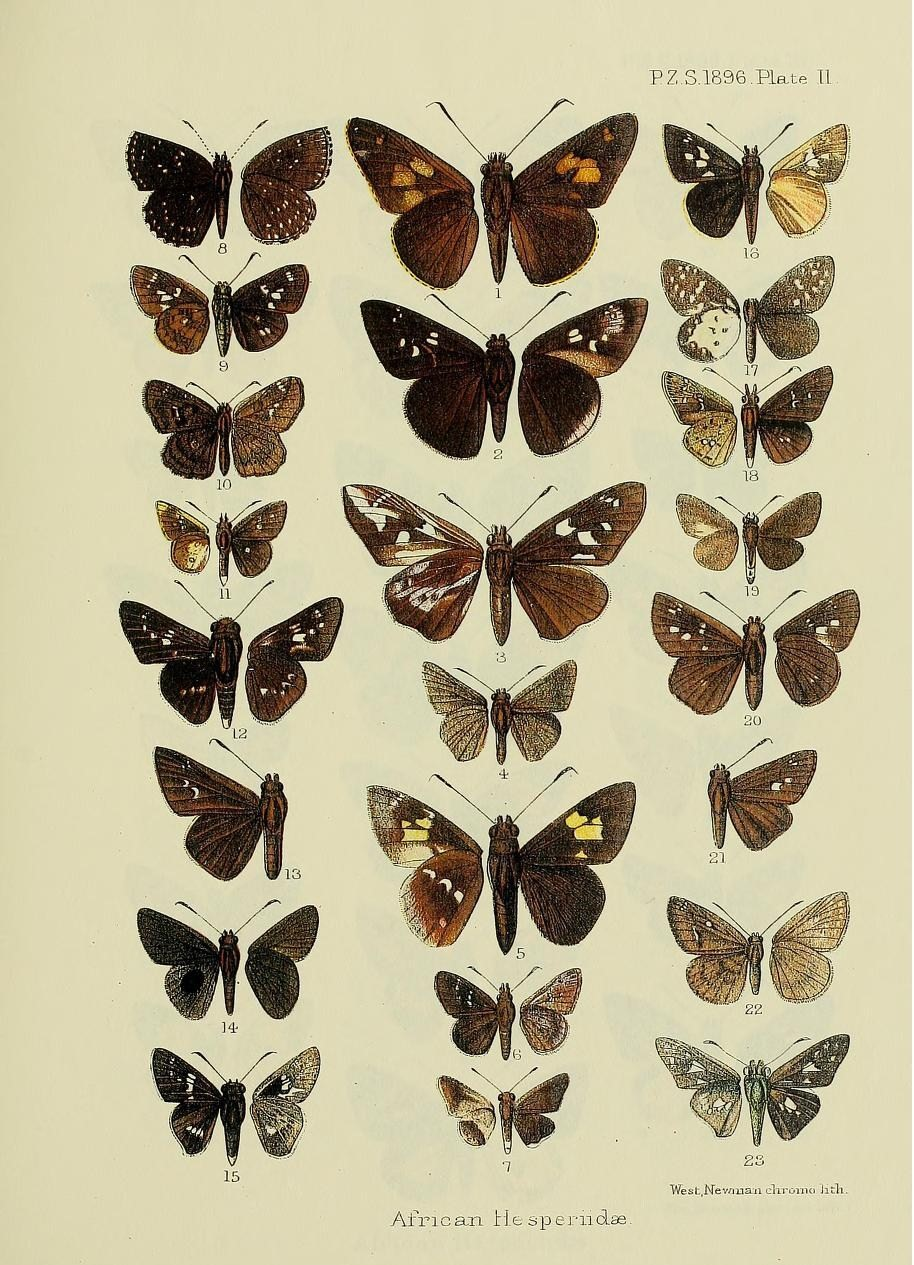
- Acleros ploetzi Mabille, 1890 male figure 7

Scientific classification
- Kingdom: Animalia
- Phylum: Arthropoda
- Class: Insecta
- Order: Lepidoptera
- Family: Hesperiidae
- Tribe: Erionotini
- Genus: Acleros; Mabille, [1886]

= Acleros =

Genus of butterflies

Acleros is an Afrotropical genus of skippers.

== Species ==
- Acleros bibundica Strand, 1913
- Acleros leucopyga (Mabille, 1877)
- Acleros mackenii (Trimen, 1868)
- Acleros neavei Evans, 1937
- Acleros nigrapex Strand, 1913
- Acleros ploetzi Mabille, 1889
- Acleros sparsum Druce, 1909

Acleros bala described by Berger from Ghana is a manuscript name.
