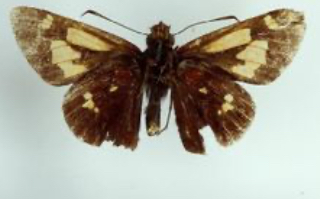

Scientific classification
- Domain: Eukaryota
- Kingdom: Animalia
- Phylum: Arthropoda
- Class: Insecta
- Order: Lepidoptera
- Family: Hesperiidae
- Genus: Acleros
- Species: A. leucopyga

Binomial name
- Acleros leucopyga (Mabille, 1877)

Synonyms
- Cyclopides leucopyga Mabille, 1877

= Acleros leucopyga =

Species of butterfly

Acleros leucopyga is a butterfly in the family Hesperiidae. It is found in southern and south-western Madagascar. The habitat consists of forests.
