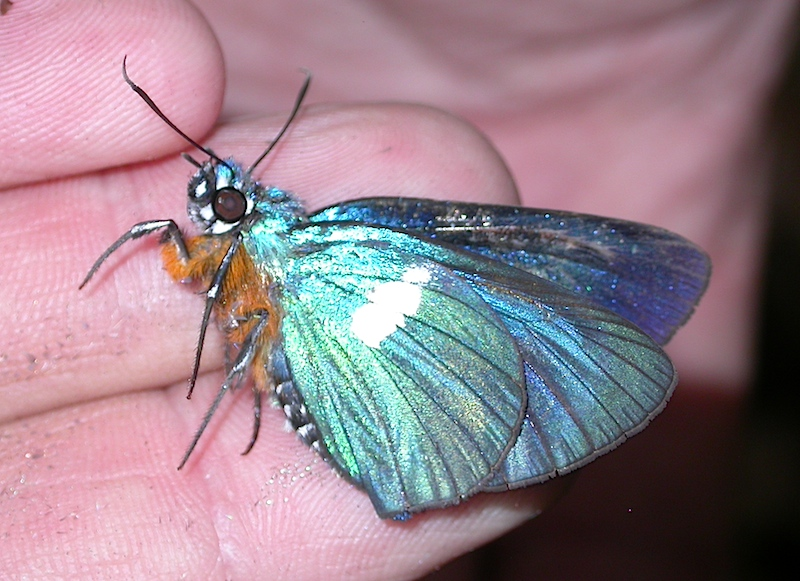

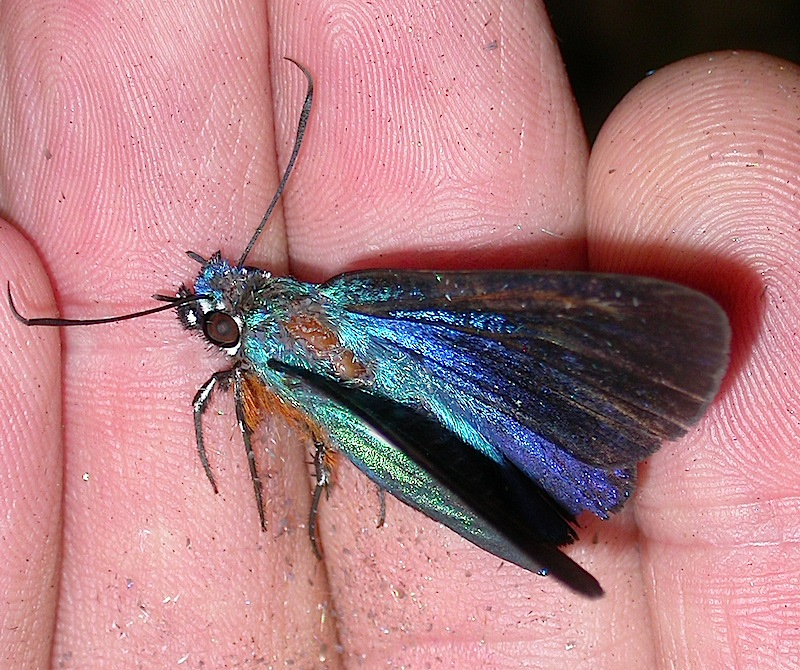

Scientific classification
- Domain: Eukaryota
- Kingdom: Animalia
- Phylum: Arthropoda
- Class: Insecta
- Order: Lepidoptera
- Family: Hesperiidae
- Genus: Coeliades
- Species: C. bixana

Binomial name
- Coeliades bixana Evans, 1940

Synonyms
- Coeliades bixae Clerck, 1759 (Preocc.)

= Coeliades bixana =

Dark blue policeman

Species of butterfly

Coeliades bixana, the dark blue policeman, is a butterfly of the family Hesperiidae.

It is found in Guinea, Ivory Coast, Ghana, Nigeria (south), Cameroon, Republic of the Congo, the Central African Republic, Angola and the Democratic Republic of the Congo. Its habitat consists of primary forests.

Larvae feed on Cassia species and Triaspis odorata.
