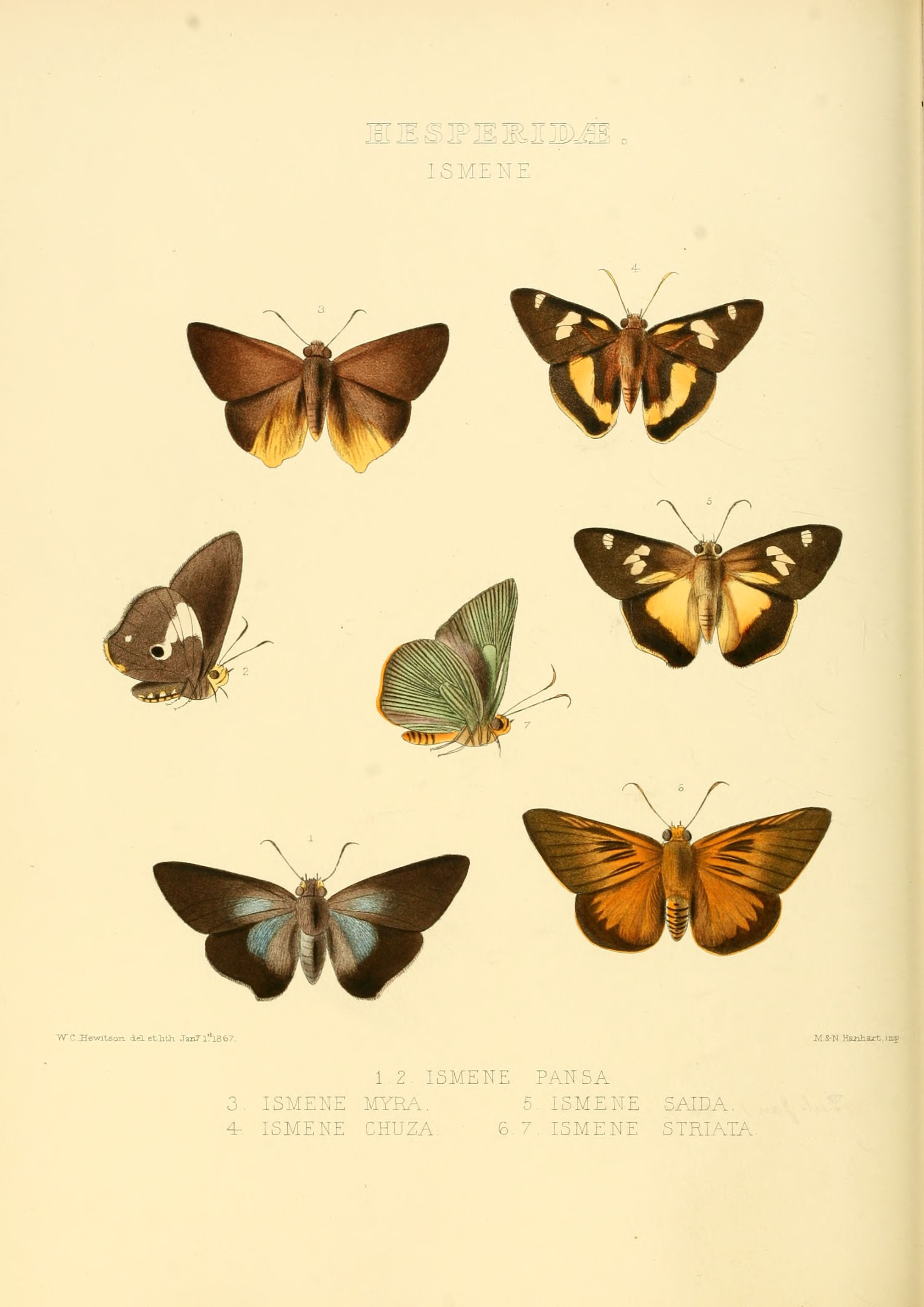

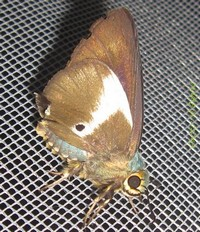

Scientific classification
- Domain: Eukaryota
- Kingdom: Animalia
- Phylum: Arthropoda
- Class: Insecta
- Order: Lepidoptera
- Family: Hesperiidae
- Genus: Coeliades
- Species: C. ernesti

Binomial name
- Coeliades ernesti (Grandidier, 1867)

Synonyms
- Hesperia ernesti Grandidier, 1867; Ismene pansa Hewitson, 1867

= Coeliades ernesti =

Species of butterfly

Coeliades ernesti is a butterfly in the family Hesperiidae. This species originates from Madagascar but was also introduced to Réunion and Mauritius (1980). Their habitat consists of forests, secondary forests and anthropogenic areas.

They have a wingspan of around 56 mm.

A known host plant of their larvae is a Malpighiaceae, Hiptage benghalensis.
