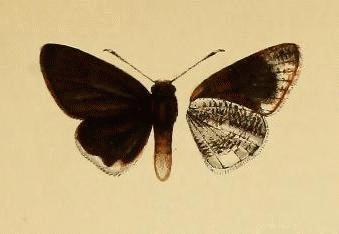

Scientific classification
- Domain: Eukaryota
- Kingdom: Animalia
- Phylum: Arthropoda
- Class: Insecta
- Order: Lepidoptera
- Family: Hesperiidae
- Genus: Acleros
- Species: A. sparsum

Binomial name
- Acleros sparsum H. H. Druce, 1909

= Acleros sparsum =

Species of butterfly

Acleros sparsum is a butterfly in the family Hesperiidae first described by Hamilton Herbert Druce in 1909. It is found in Cameroon and the Democratic Republic of the Congo (from the eastern part of the country to the Ituri Forest).
