= Acridocarpus monodii =

Conservation status
- Endangered (IUCN 3.1)

Scientific classification
- Kingdom: Plantae
- Clade: Tracheophytes
- Clade: Angiosperms
- Clade: Eudicots
- Clade: Rosids
- Order: Malpighiales
- Family: Malpighiaceae
- Genus: Acridocarpus
- Species: A. monodii

Binomial name
- Acridocarpus monodii Arènes & P.Jaeger ex Birnbaum & J.Florence

Species of flowering plant

Acridocarpus monodii is a species of plant in the Malpighiaceae family. It is endemic to central Mali, where it is limited to the Bandiagara Escarpment region, in the ecotone of the West Sudanian Savanna and Sahelian Acacia Savanna.

The plants have been collected at the villages of Douentza, Kikara and Djime north of the sandstone escarpment, southwards to the village of Yabatalou where it occurs at highest density. It is associated with underground water sources, especially at the base of the cliffs, and flowers and fruits throughout the dry winter season.

It is deemed a vicariant species of A. chevalieri, which has been collected from the Manding Hills, Mali.
