= Acleros bibundica =

Scientific classification
- Domain: Eukaryota
- Kingdom: Animalia
- Phylum: Arthropoda
- Class: Insecta
- Order: Lepidoptera
- Family: Hesperiidae
- Genus: Acleros
- Species: A. bibundica

Binomial name
- Acleros bibundica Strand, 1913

Synonyms
- Acleros displacidus Rebel, 1914

Species of insect

Acleros bibundica is a butterfly in the family Hesperiidae. It is found in Cameroon and the Democratic Republic of the Congo.
