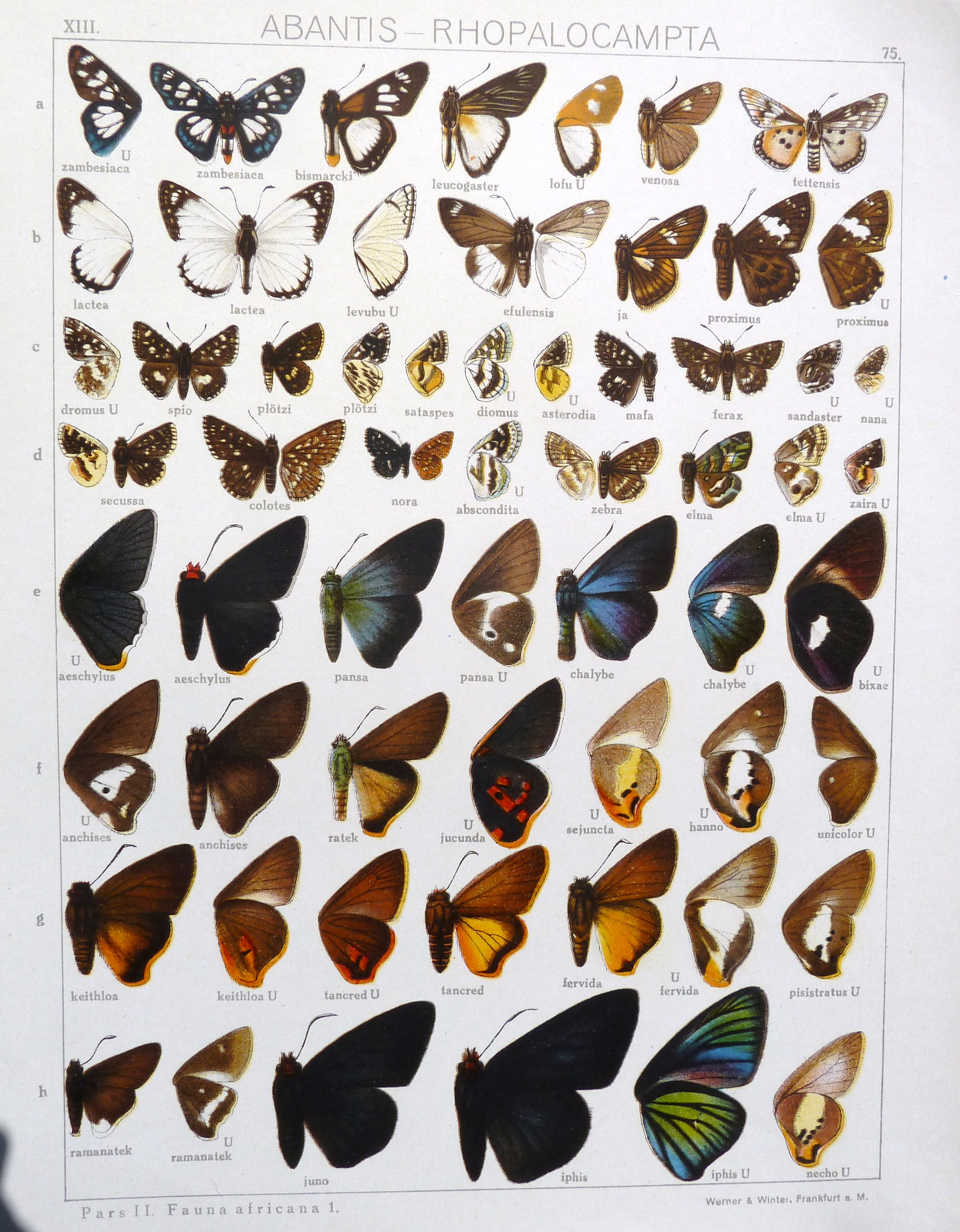

Scientific classification
- Domain: Eukaryota
- Kingdom: Animalia
- Phylum: Arthropoda
- Class: Insecta
- Order: Lepidoptera
- Family: Hesperiidae
- Genus: Coeliades
- Species: C. fervida

Binomial name
- Coeliades fervida (Butler, 1880)

Synonyms
- Hesperia fervida Butler, 1880

= Coeliades fervida =

Species of butterfly

Coeliades fervida is a butterfly in the family Hesperiidae. It is found in eastern, south-eastern and central Madagascar. The habitat consists of forests and forest margins.
