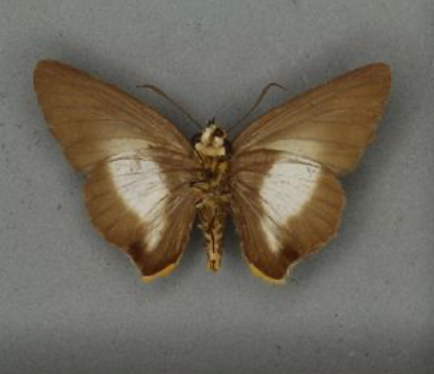

Scientific classification
- Domain: Eukaryota
- Kingdom: Animalia
- Phylum: Arthropoda
- Class: Insecta
- Order: Lepidoptera
- Family: Hesperiidae
- Genus: Coeliades
- Species: C. fidia

Binomial name
- Coeliades fidia Evans, 1937

= Coeliades fidia =

Species of butterfly

Coeliades fidia is a butterfly in the family Hesperiidae. It is found in eastern, western and central Madagascar.
