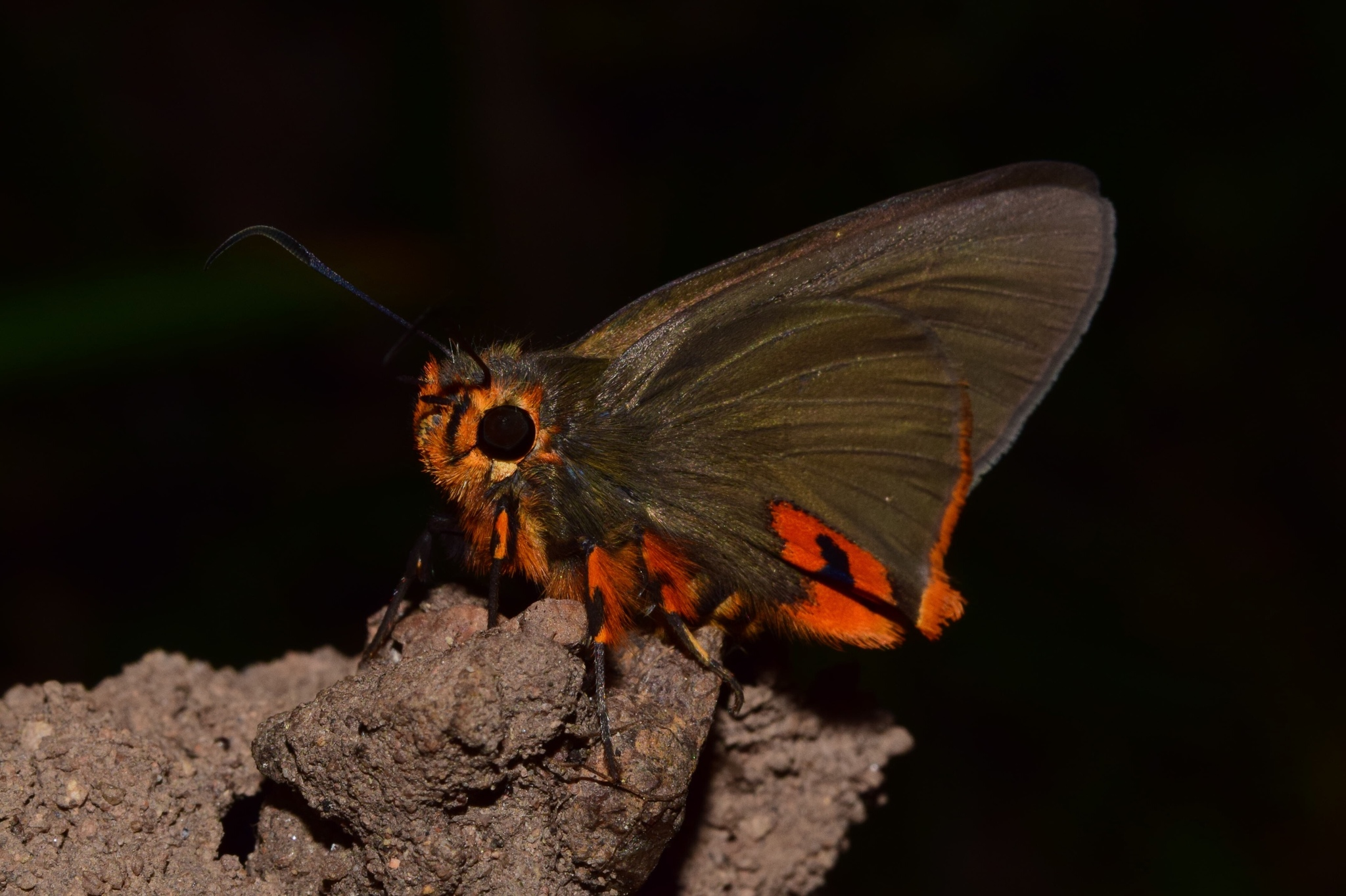

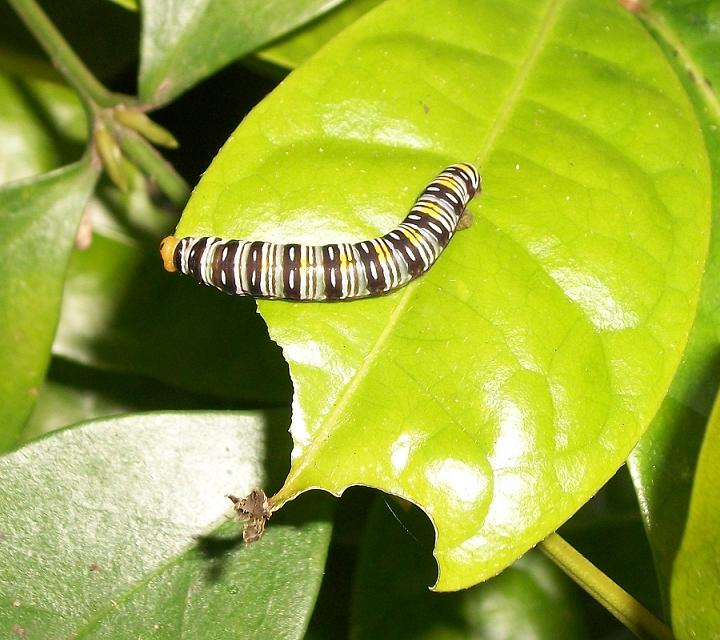
- Larva on Acridocarpus natalitius

Scientific classification
- Domain: Eukaryota
- Kingdom: Animalia
- Phylum: Arthropoda
- Class: Insecta
- Order: Lepidoptera
- Family: Hesperiidae
- Genus: Coeliades
- Species: C. keithloa

Binomial name
- Coeliades keithloa (Wallengren, 1857)

Synonyms
- Rhopalocampta keithloa Wallengren, 1857; Ismene stella Trimen, 1862; Ismene tancred Plötz, 1884; Coeliades kenya Evans, 1937; Rhopalocampta menelik Ungemach, 1932

= Coeliades keithloa =

Species of butterfly

Coeliades keithloa, the red-tab policeman, is a butterfly of the family Hesperiidae. It is found from Ethiopia south to South Africa.

The wingspan is 58–64 mm for males and 61–66 mm for females. Adults are on wing year-round in warmer areas with peaks in late summer and autumn in southern Africa.

The larvae feed on a wide range of plants, including Barringtonia racemosa, Acridocarpus natalitius, A. zanzibaricus, A. glaucescens, A. ristalitius, Stephanotis (syn. Dregea), Combretum and Byrsocarpus species.

== Subspecies ==
- Coeliades keithloa keithloa (South Africa: KwaZulu-Natal, Eastern Cape Province)
- Coeliades keithloa kenya Evans, 1937 (coast of Kenya, Tanzania: from the northern coast inland to Mount Kilimanjaro)
- Coeliades keithloa menelik (Ungemach, 1932) (south-western Ethiopia, southern Sudan, Uganda)
- Coeliades keithloa merua Evans, 1947 (Kenya: north-eastern slopes of Mount Kenya)
