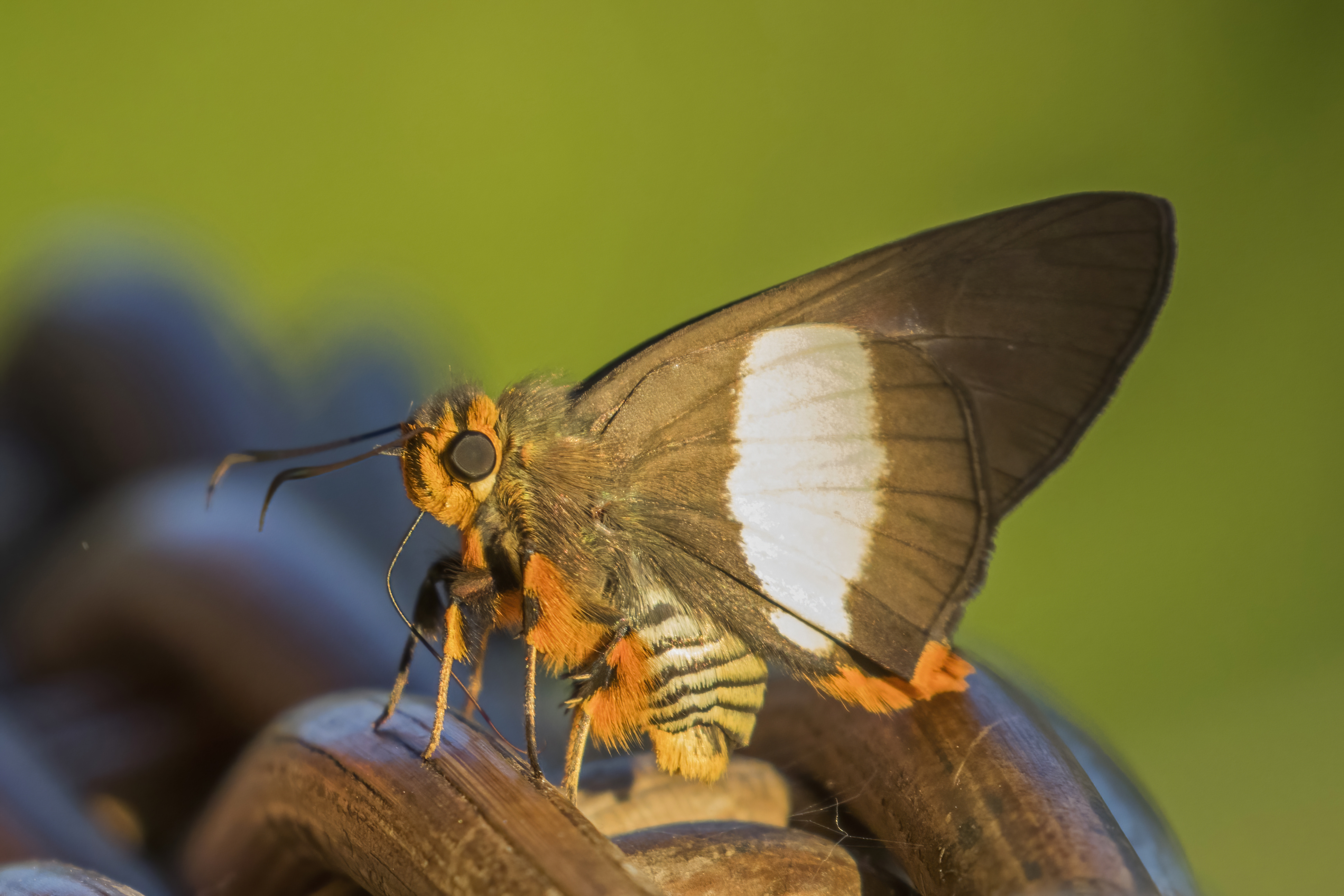
- C. f. forestan, Namibia
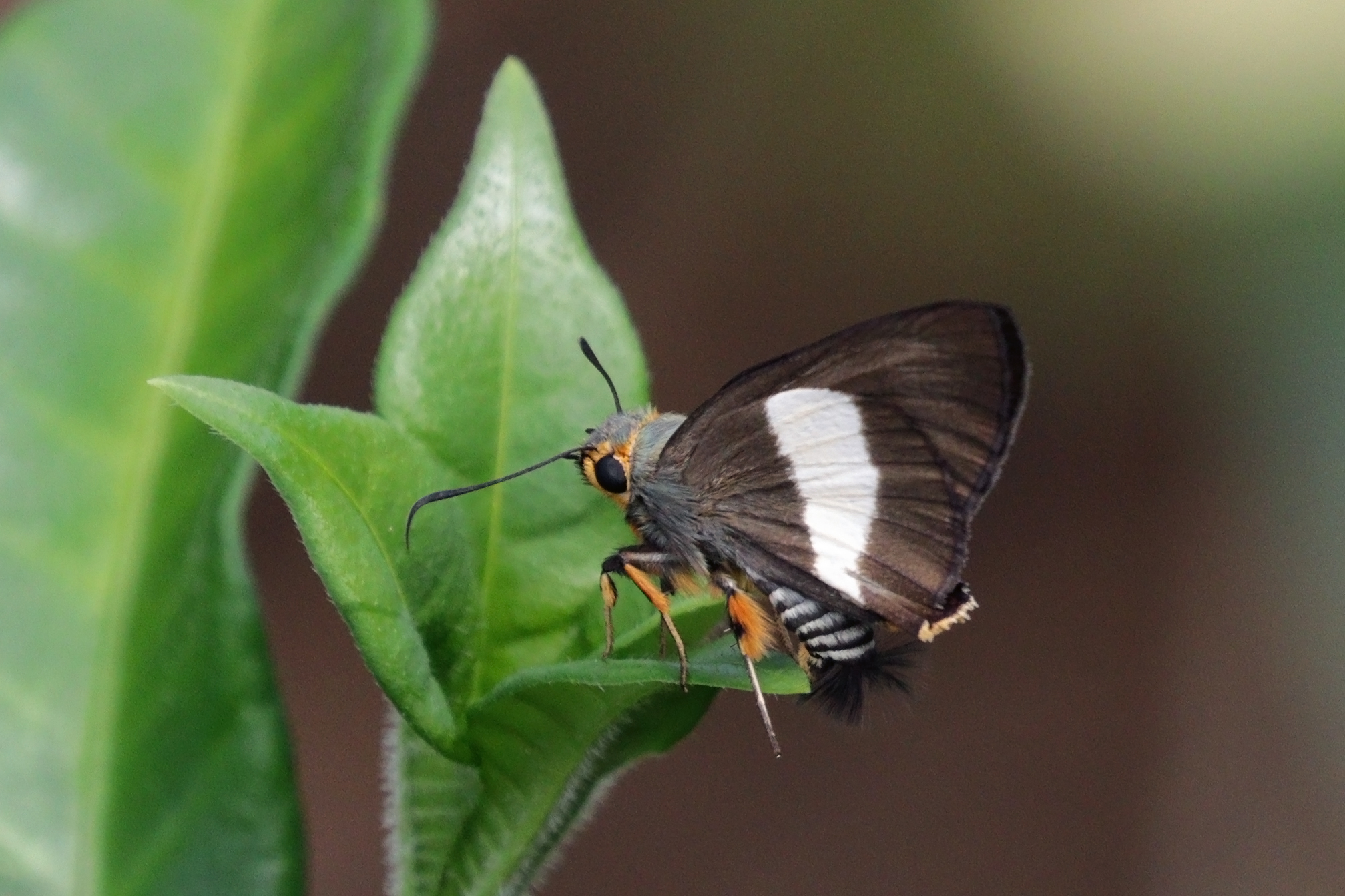
- C. f. arbogastes, Madagascar

Scientific classification
- Kingdom: Animalia
- Phylum: Arthropoda
- Clade: Pancrustacea
- Class: Insecta
- Order: Lepidoptera
- Family: Hesperiidae
- Genus: Coeliades
- Species: C. forestan

Binomial name
- Coeliades forestan (Stoll, [1782])

Synonyms
- Papilio forestan Stoll, [1782]; Thymele arbogastes Guenee, 1863; Coeliades arbogastes; Hesperia margarita Butler, 1879

= Coeliades forestan =

Striped policeman

Species of butterfly

Coeliades forestan, the striped policeman, is a butterfly of the family Hesperiidae. It is found from Transkei to Zimbabwe and to Botswana, and also in Western Africa, including Burkina Faso. It is also present on Madagascar and Mauritius.

The wingspan is 45–55 mm for males and 55–64 mm for females. Adults are on wing year-round in warmer areas with peaks September to April.

The larvae feed on a wide range of plants, including Parinari curatellifolia, Lonchocarpus capassa, Combretum bracteosum, Combretum apiculatum, Solanum auriculatum, Solanum mauritianum, Millettia sutherlandii, Sphedamnocarpus rhamni, Sphedamnocarpus pruriens and Robinia pseudacacia.

== Subspecies ==
- Coeliades forestan forestan (Sub-Saharan Africa)
- Coeliades forestan arbogastes (Guenee, 1863) (Madagascar & Mauritius)

Torben Larsen developed a species numbering system for his 2005 publication Butterflies of West Africa. The nominate subspecies is #1207. The 'Larsen' numbers have since been used with permission in A Sharp Eye on Butterflies of Ghana.

== Stamps ==
The Republic of Chad has issued a stamp showing a Coeliades forestan in 2003.
