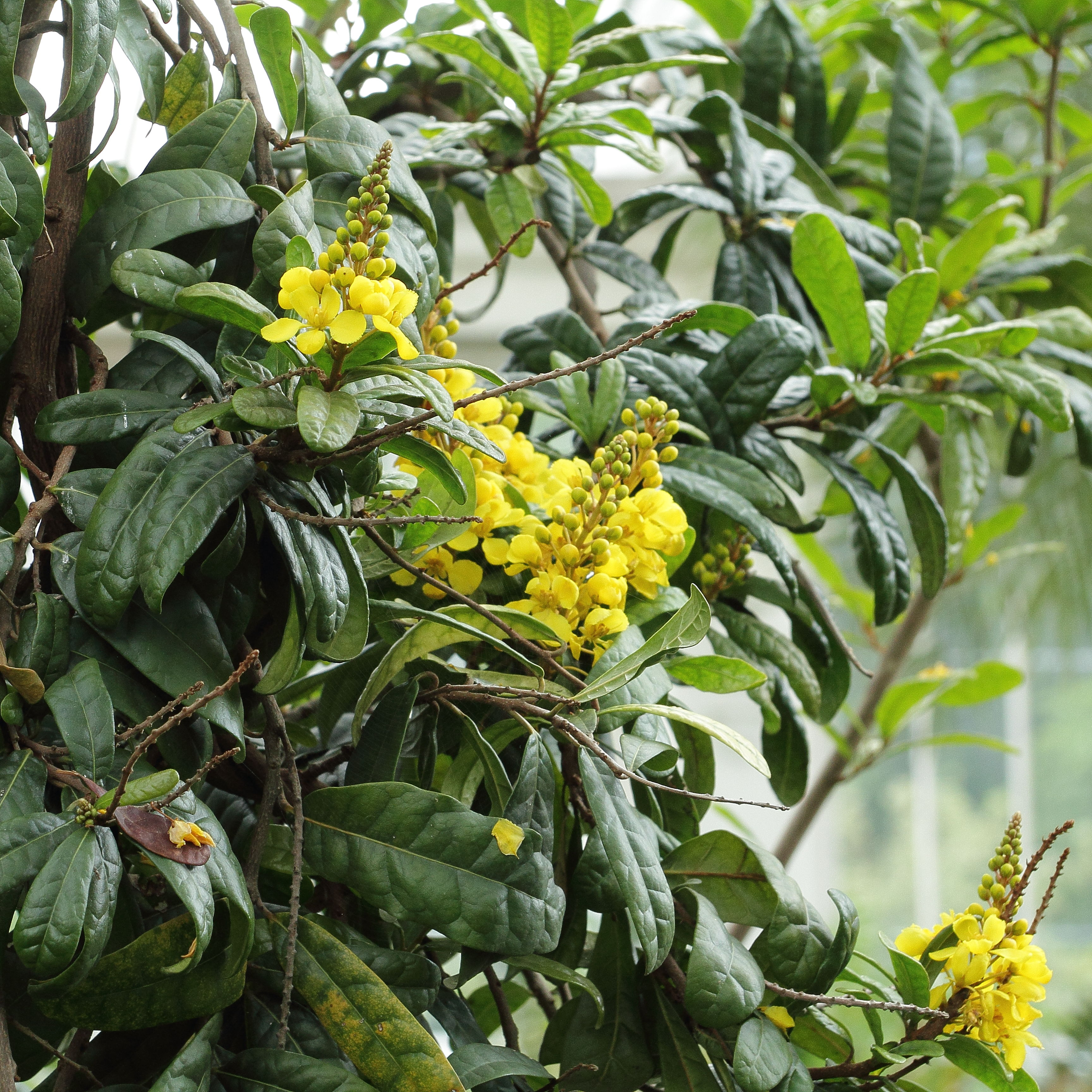
- Acridocapus natalitius at Kew Gardens

Scientific classification
- Kingdom: Plantae
- Clade: Tracheophytes
- Clade: Angiosperms
- Clade: Eudicots
- Clade: Rosids
- Order: Malpighiales
- Family: Malpighiaceae
- Genus: Acridocarpus
- Species: A. natalitius

Binomial name
- Acridocarpus natalitius Adr. & Juss. var. natalitius Adr. & Juss. var. linearifolius Launert

Synonyms
- Acridocarpus natalitius var. acuminatus Nied.; Acridocarpus natalitius var. natalitius; Acridocarpus natalitius var. obtusus Nied.; Acridocarpus pondoensis Engl. ex Nied.; Acridocarpus reticulatus Burtt Davy; Anomalopterys natalitia (A.Juss.) Kuntze; Banisteria kraussiana Hochst.

= Acridocarpus natalitius =

Species of flowering plant

Acridocarpus natalitius, the moth fruit, is a species of plant in the Malpighiaceae family. It is found in south-eastern Africa.

== Description ==
This evergreen plant has a highly variable growth form, ranging from a twiner growing on other plants to being a small tree (1–5 m (3.3–16.4 ft) tall). The bark is grey and rough. The young stems and leaves may be covered in pinkish hairs, but these fall of as the stems and leaves age. The leaves are leathery and become a shiny green when the hairs are no longer present. They are alternately arranged and have a clear midrib with net veins. Dark glands may be present where the petiole meets the leaf or on the underside of the lamina.

The yellow flowers are present between September and February. The spreading petals have lacerated edges.

The fruits have two or three elongated triangular wings. The way that they are fused, makes the fruit look like a moth with spread wings, given the plant its common name. These are present between November and April.

== Distribution and habitat ==
It is the southernmost species of its genus and grows in subtropical dry forests, shrubland, coastal forests, sand forests and savannas. It ranges from Pondoland to Limpopo in South Africa, and eastwards to Eswatini and Mozambique.

== Ecology ==
The flowers are visited by ants and bees. The samara fruit appear in summer, each with two to three veined wings, which remind of a moth with opened wings. It is a host plant for skipper butterflies. The leaves are also eaten by game.

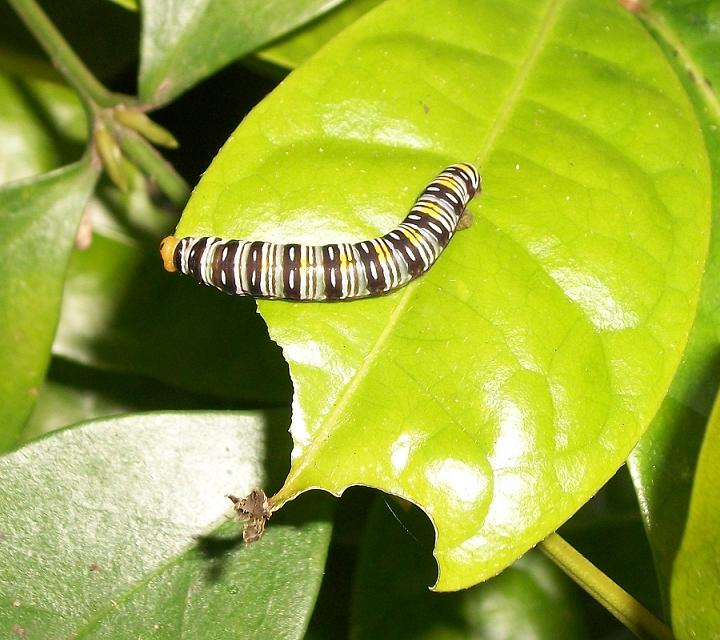
Skipper larva on leaf

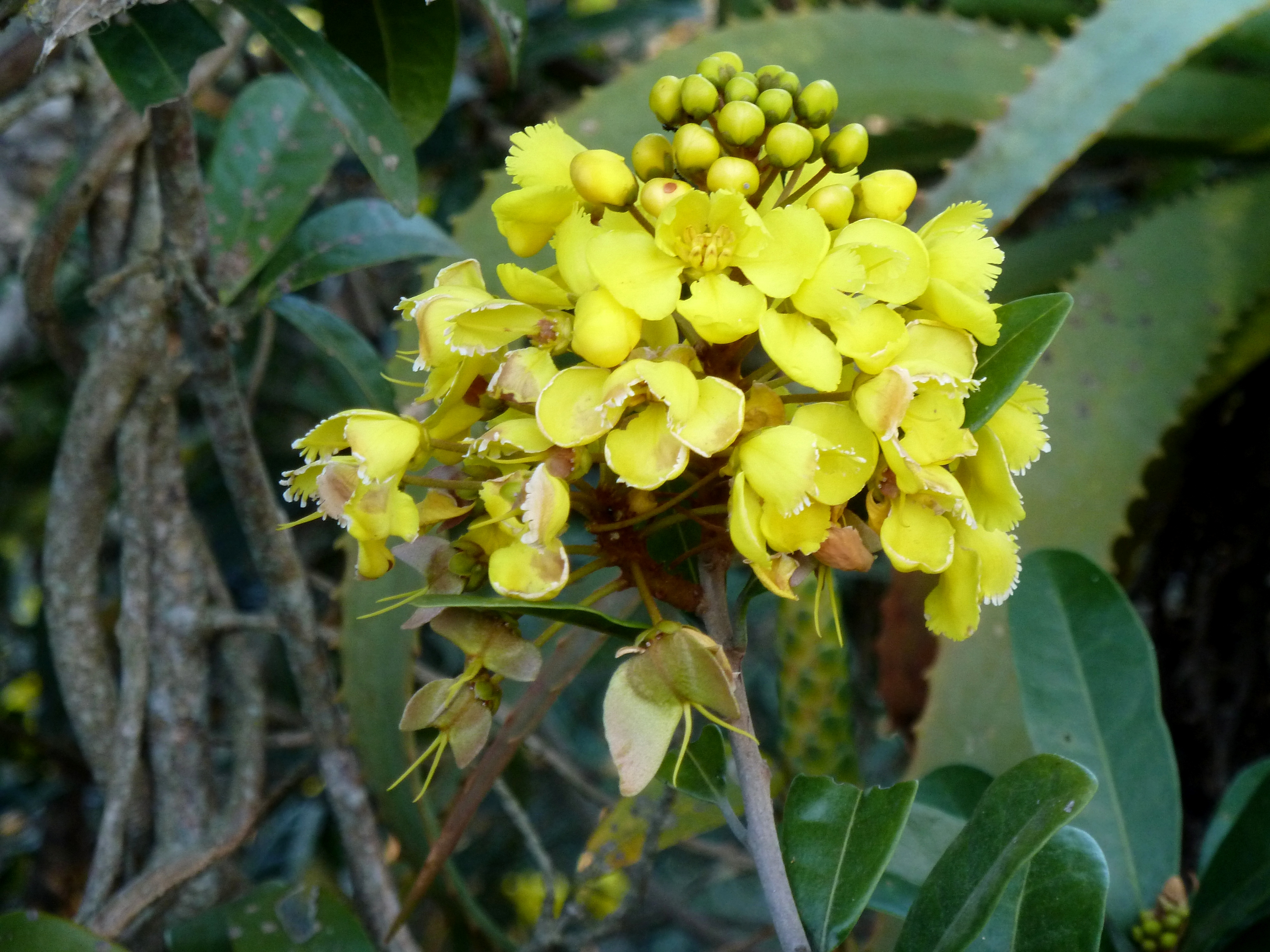
Flowers and young fruit

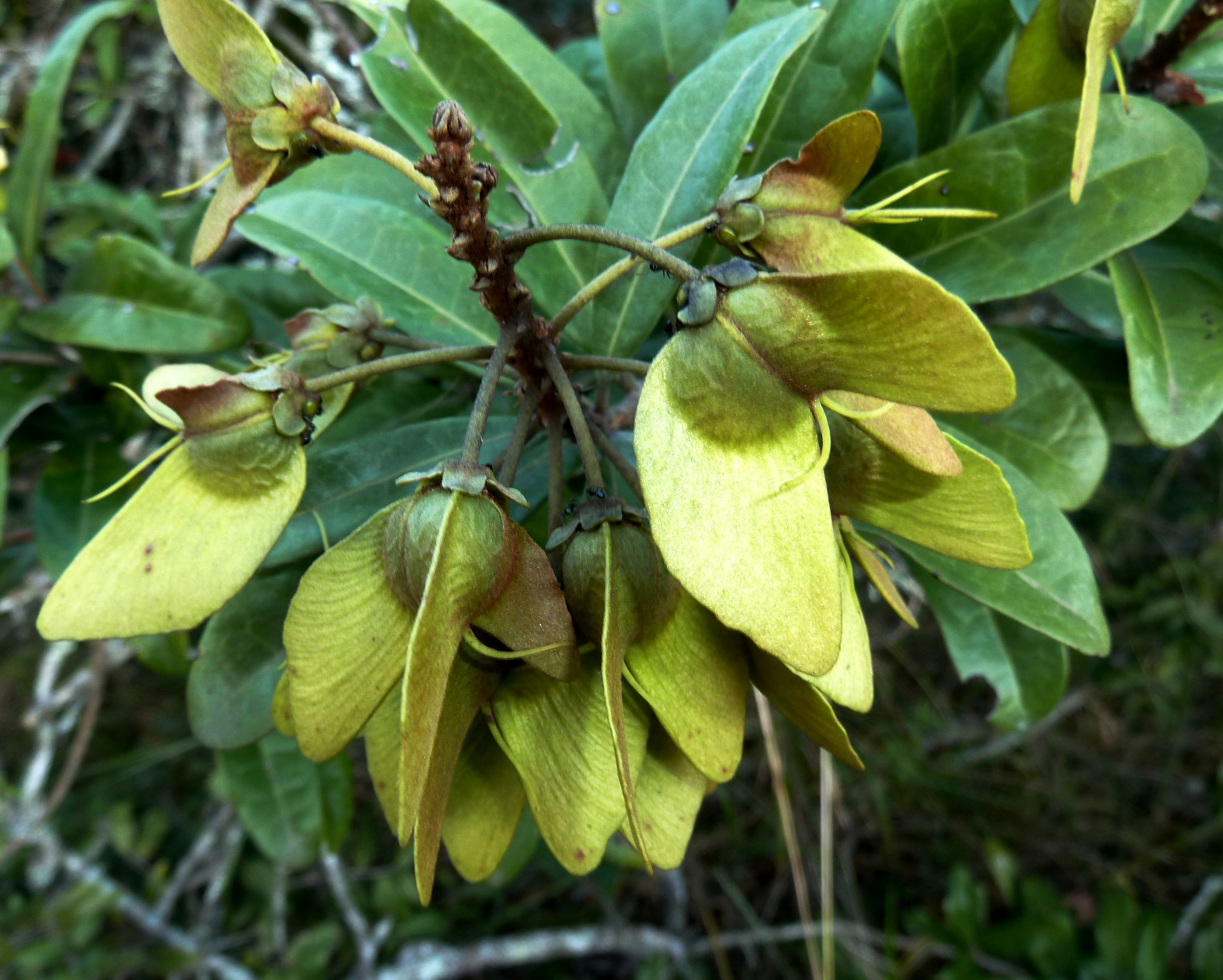
Green fruit

== Uses ==
This plant is still frequently sold in South African Muthi markets (markets in which traditional medicines are sold). If consumed, the powdered root of this plant causes vomiting and diahoerea. It is also used in ointments.

This plant also has several non-medical traditional uses. The roots are used, along with other ingredients, to make a mixture called intelezi, which can be used to hinder court procedures by making the accuser mute, repetitive or irrelevant. Intelezi may also be sprinkled around a homestead during a thunderstorm, used to strengthen fighting sticks or to induce vomiting in order to cleanse a whole family. Herdboys may also place a piece of root under their tongues to avoid punishment if the cattle wandered into crops. The roots can be used to avert anger if a fault has been committed.

== Conservation ==
This plant is critically endangered in Zimbabwe. It is not, however, considered to be threatened in South Africa.The population as a whole, however, is classified as least concern by the IUCN. It remains common, even if the population is fragmented and declining. While it cannot grow in areas that are continuously disturbed for agriculture or mining, it has been found in areas that have previously been disturbed (for example, for farming or for forestry). This suggests it is somewhat resilient to disturbances.
