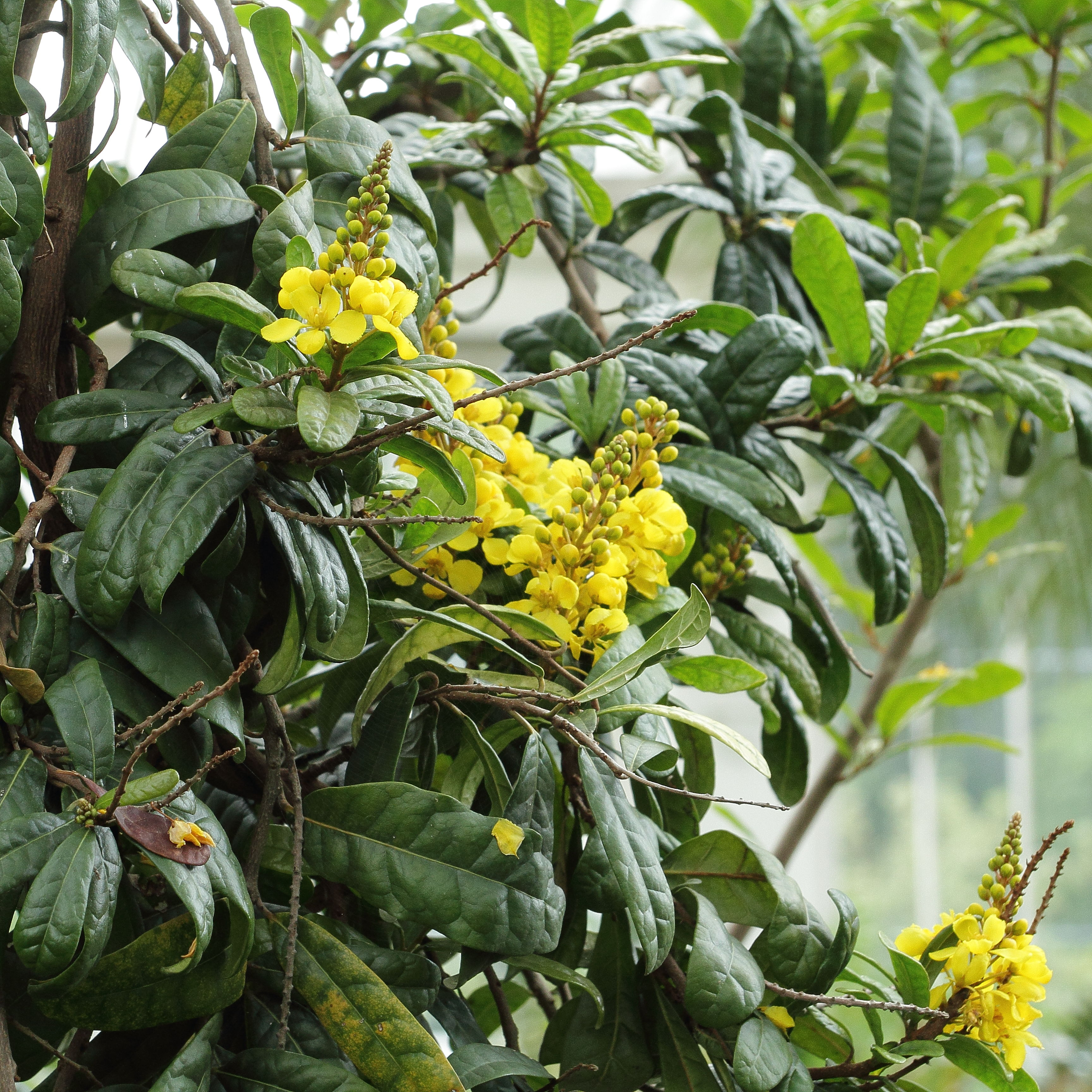
- Acridocarpus natalitius

Scientific classification
- Kingdom: Plantae
- Clade: Tracheophytes
- Clade: Angiosperms
- Clade: Eudicots
- Clade: Rosids
- Order: Malpighiales
- Family: Malpighiaceae
- Genus: Acridocarpus (G.Don) Guill. et Perr.

= Acridocarpus =

Genus of flowering plants

Acridocarpus (from Gr. Akris, a locust and carpos, a fruit, alluding to the winged fruit) is a genus of flowering plants in the family Malpighiaceae. Species in this genus are native to Arabia and tropical and subtropical Africa, with one species in New Caledonia.

== Species ==
There are 36 species, which include:

- Acridocarpus adenophorus A.Juss.
- Acridocarpus alopecurus Sprague
- Acridocarpus alternifolius (Schumach. & Thonn.) Nied.
- Acridocarpus austrocaledonicus Baill.
- Acridocarpus ballyi Launert
- Acridocarpus camerunensis Nied.
- Acridocarpus chevalieri Sprague
- Acridocarpus chloropterus Oliv.
- Acridocarpus congestus Launert
- Acridocarpus congolensis Sprague
- Acridocarpus excelsus A.Juss.
- Acridocarpus glaucescens Engl.
- Acridocarpus humbertii Arènes
- Acridocarpus humblotii Baill.
- Acridocarpus katangensis De Wild.
- Acridocarpus longifolius (G.Don) Hook.f.
- Acridocarpus macrocalyx Engl.
- Acridocarpus mayumbensis Gonç. & E.Launert
- Acridocarpus monodii Arènes & P.Jaeger ex Birnbaum & J.Florence
- Acridocarpus natalitius Adr. & Juss.
- Acridocarpus oppositifolius R.Vig. & Humbert ex Arènes
- Acridocarpus orientalis Jebel Hafeet, UAE / Oman
- Acridocarpus pauciglandulosus Launert
- Acridocarpus perrieri Ames
- Acridocarpus plagiopterus Guill. & Perr.
- Acridocarpus prasinus Exell
- Acridocarpus scheffleri Engl.
- Acridocarpus smeathmannii (DC.) Guill. & Perr.
- Acridocarpus socotranus Oliv.
- Acridocarpus spectabilis (Nied.) Doorn-Hoekm.
- Acridocarpus staudtii (Engl.) Engl. ex Hutch. & Dalziel
- Acridocarpus taitensis Mwadime, Ngumbau & Q.Luke
- Acridocarpus ugandensis Sprague
- Acridocarpus vanderystii R.Wilczek
- Acridocarpus vivy Arènes
- Acridocarpus zanzibaricus A.Juss.
