= Masehlaneng =

Coordinates: 24.138°S 28.956°E

Masehlaneng is a village situated northwest of the town of Mokopane in the Mogalakwena Local Municipality of the Waterberg District in Limpopo, South Africa. It is about 8 km from Mokopane. The population is multiethnic. The dominant languages in the area are Northern Sotho and Northern Ndebele.

The village shares boundaries with the villages Ga-Madiba, Moshate, Sekgakgapeng and Maroteng. It also borders the Magopane River and Mogalakwena River.

== Culture ==
The village is located in a bushveld environment and has influences from Northern Sotho, Transvaal Ndebele, Tsonga and Sesotho cultures.

== Schools ==
- Mmadikana Secondary School is a public secondary school and Motshitshi Primary School is a public primary school located at Masehlaneng.

== Soccer Grounds ==
There are two soccer grounds where soccer is played:

1. Smiling Soccer Ground
2. Bananas Soccer Ground

== River ==
Magopane River is a small river that supplies water to Mogalakwena River. There are a few bridges that cross over the river (such as the N11 road).
