= Mosesetjane =

- Location within Limpopo Location within South Africa
- Coordinates: 24.091°S 28.939°E
- Country: South Africa
- Province: Limpopo
- District: Waterberg
- Municipality: Mogalakwena

Government
  - Councillor: moses kekana

Area
  - Total: 1.98 km^{2} (0.76 sq mi)

Population (2001)
  - Total: 4,955
  - Density: 2,500/km^{2} (6,480/sq mi)
- Time zone: UTC+2 (SAST)

Mosesetjane is a village situated northwest of the town of Mokopane in the Waterberg District of the Limpopo province of South Africa. It is divided into three sections under three chiefs: Chief Kekana of the Kgobudi section, Chief Frans Ledwaba of the Sekgoboko section, and Chief N Lebelo of the Mmalepetleke area.

The population is multiethnic. The dominant languages in the area are Northern Sotho and Sumayela Ndebele.

This village shares boundaries with the following villages to the east and far east: Tshamahansi, Ga-Magongoa, and Ga-Mokaba. To the south Mosesetjane is boarded by Masodi, Moshate, and Ga-Madiba. Sandsloot, Mapela, and the Mogalakwena Platinum Mine are found to the north of this village.

This agriculture-rich village has a state-of-the-art clinic based in the Sekgoboko Zone 2 area, which caters for the entire village; the clinic is conveniently situated next to the road that passes through the village to Mapela Village. Economically, the area is boosted by the neighbouring Mogalakwena Platinum Mine (formerly Potgitersrust Platinum Limited Mine), which employs many members of the community. In recent years, the area has seen an influx of immigrants attracted by the platinum mine.

The village is currently represented in the Mogalakwena Municipality by Councillors Kenneth Kekana (Who represents the Kgobudi area) and Ramashala (representing Malepetleke and Sekgoboko). In late 2010 the Mogalakwena Municipality completed a R2,8 million rands tarred road and storm-water drainage system throughout the Malepetleke section of the village. Though some of the roads are tarred, most of the inner roads are somewhat bad.

== Local media ==
- Mokopane FM (accessed on 100.0 MHz (FM band) around the Mokopane area)
- The Podium (a weekly community newspaper)
- Bosvelder (a weekly community newspaper)

== Education ==
=== Secondary (High) schools ===
- Matsibe High School (Malepetleke)
- Alfred B. Makapan (Sekgoboko, Zone 2)
- Lekwa High School (Kgobudi area)

=== Primary schools ===
- Kgopedinota Primary School (Kgobudi)
- Sepedi Primary School (Sekgoboko Zone 2)
- Kgwatlhele Primary School (Malepetleke)
