= Bushveld =

Sub-tropical woodland ecoregion of Southern Africa

Coordinates: 24°S 28°E

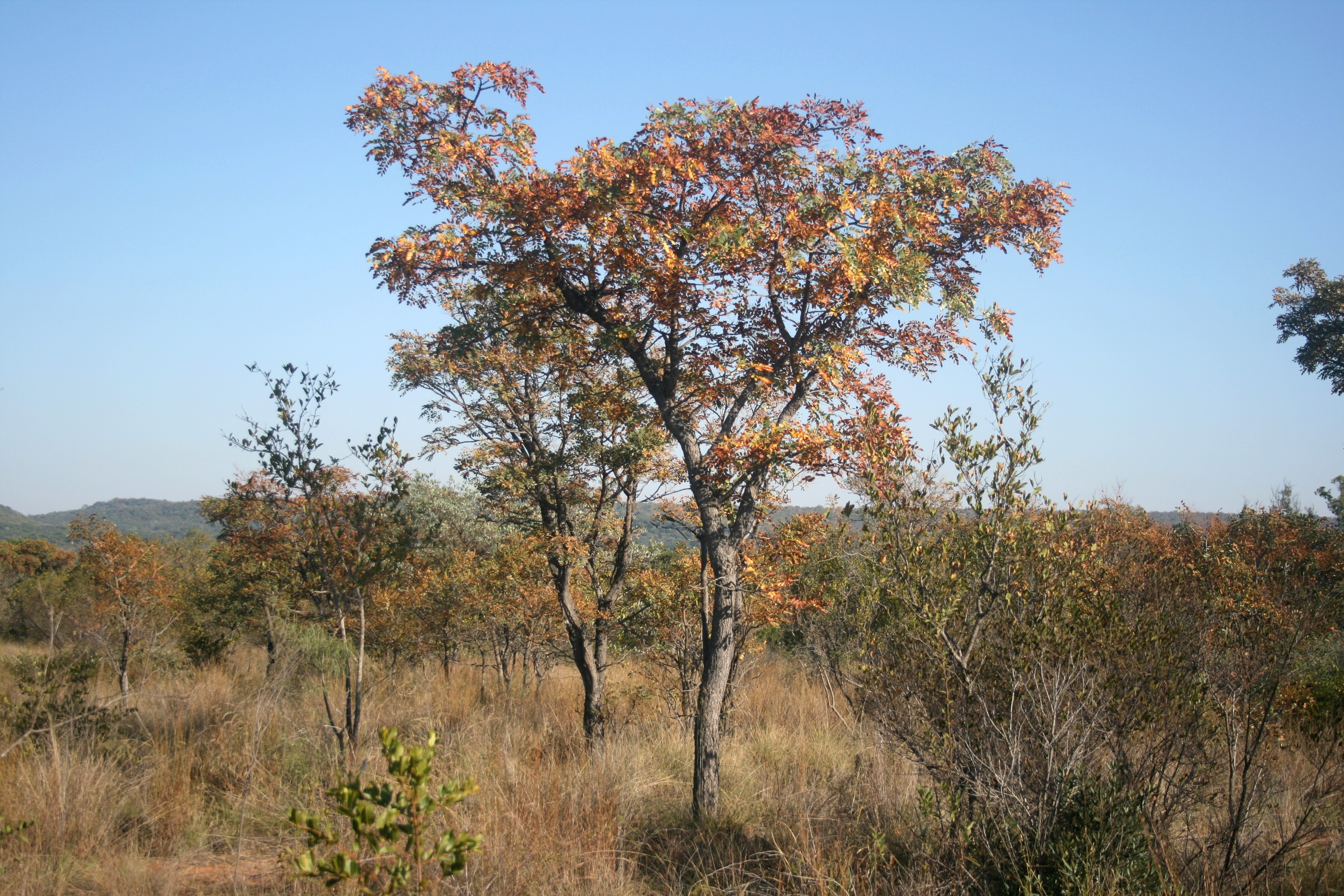
- Bushveld in the Waterberg Biosphere

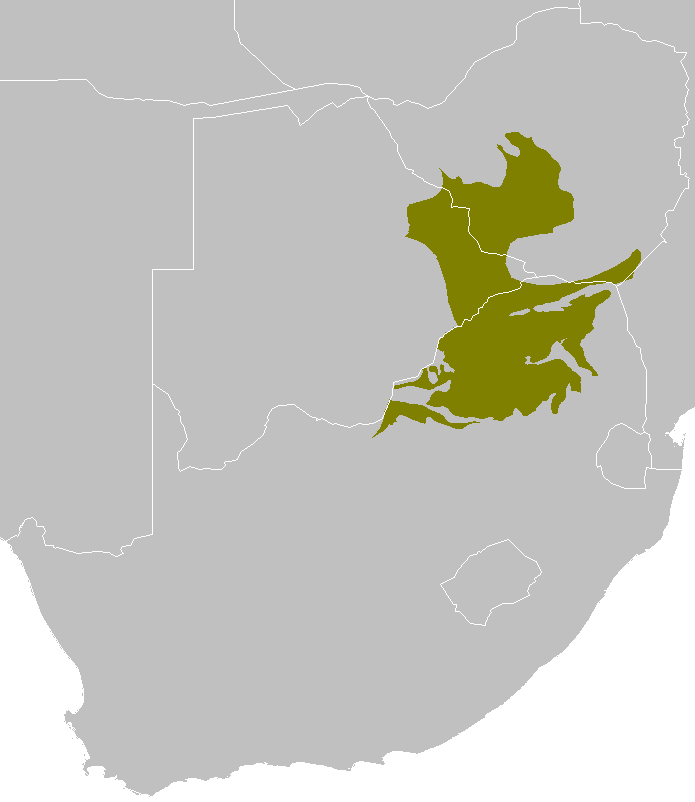
- Extent of bushveld in Southern Africa

Ecology
- Realm: Afrotropical
- Biome: tropical and subtropical grasslands, savannas, and shrublands
- Borders: List: Drakensberg montane grasslands, woodlands, and forests; Highveld grasslands; Kalahari acacia woodlands; Makgadikgadi halophytics; Southern miombo woodlands; Zambezian Baikiaea woodlands; Zambezian and mopane woodlands

Geography
- Area: 223,000 km^{2} (86,000 sq mi)
- Countries: Botswana; South Africa, Zimbabwe

Conservation
- Conservation status: Vulnerable

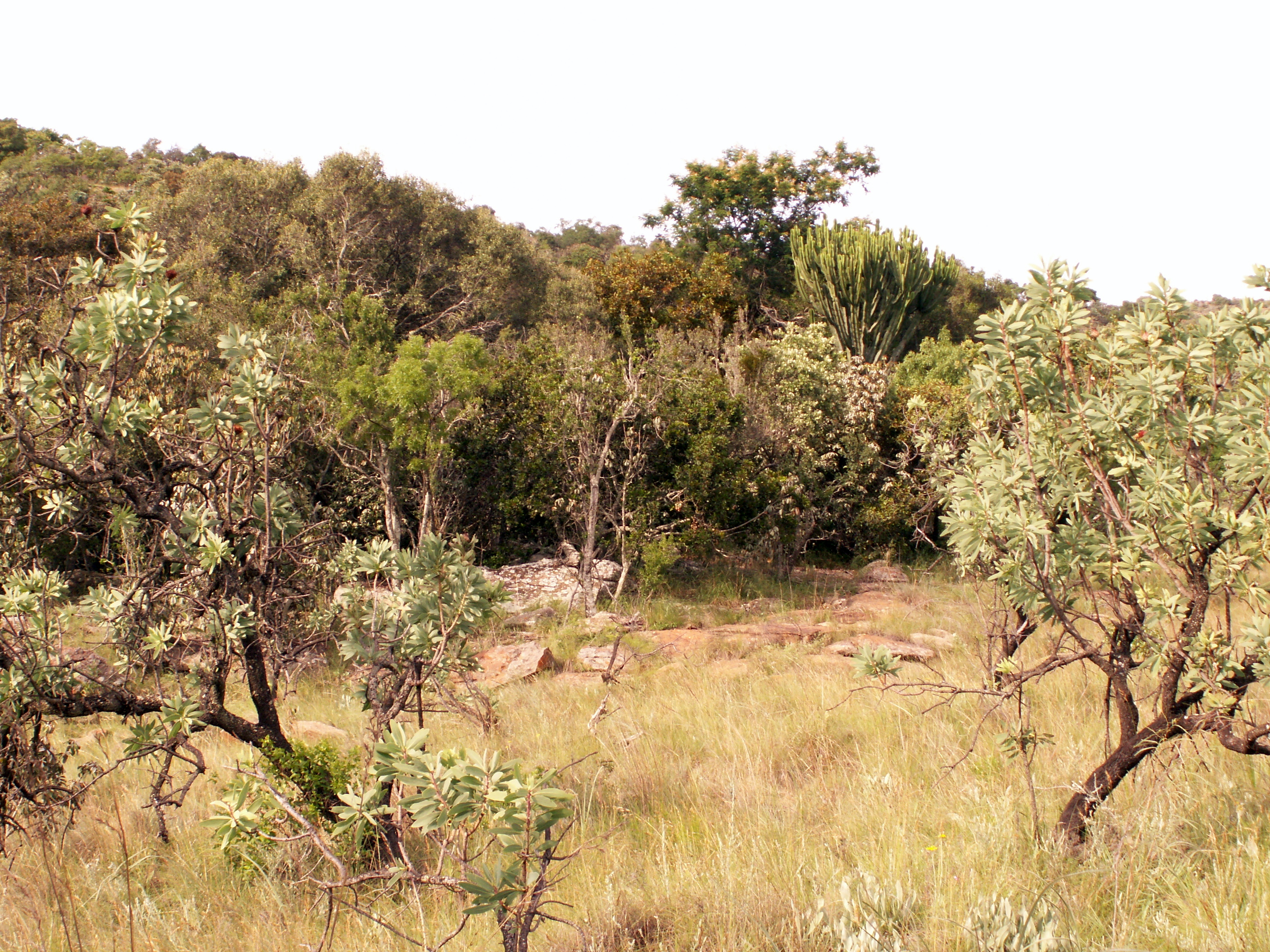
Higher altitude bushveld near Mookgophong, Limpopo

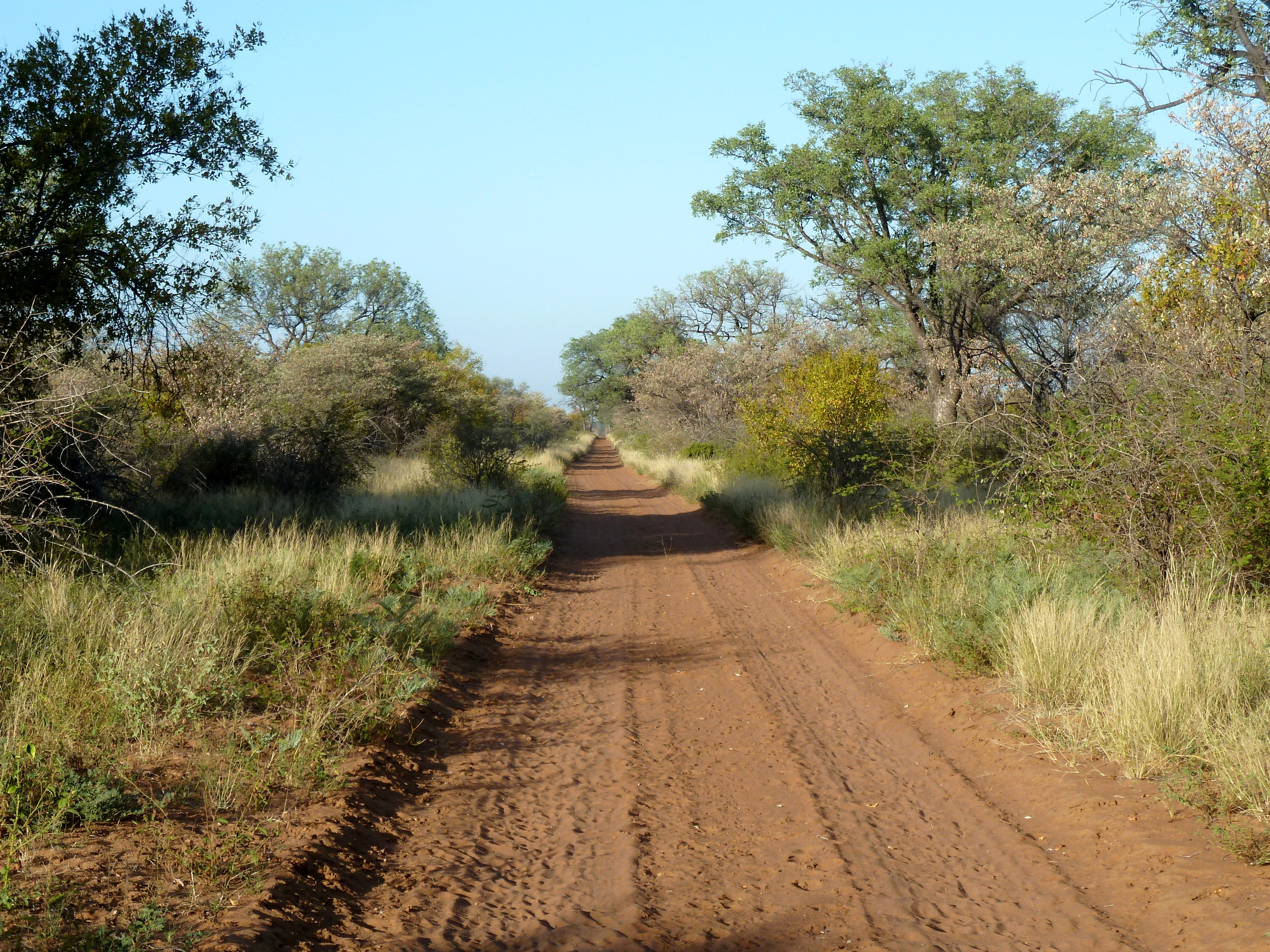
Low altitude bushveld in the Limpopo valley

The Bushveld (from Afrikaans: bosveld, Afrikaans: bos 'bush' and Afrikaans: veld) is a sub-tropical woodland ecoregion of Southern Africa. The ecoregion straddles the Tropic of Capricorn and constitutes the southern part of the Zambezian region. It encompasses most of Limpopo and a small part of North West in South Africa, the Central and North-East Districts of Botswana and the Matabeleland South and part of Matabeleland North provinces of Zimbabwe. The Kruger National Park has a number of 'Bushveld' camps, but these are strictly speaking in the lowveld, as these terms are sometimes used interchangeably. Although their limits are somewhat blurred, lowveld is generally restricted to the more easterly parts of South Africa and Zimbabwe.

== Geography ==
The elevation of this region varies from 750 to 1,400 m and the annual rainfall ranges from 350 mm in the west to 600 mm in parts of the northeast. There are four significant mountain ranges in this region: the Magaliesberg which runs from Rustenburg in the west to Bronkhorstspruit in the east and forms the southern border of the Bushveld; the Drakensberg escarpment that forms the eastern border of the Bushveld and runs from Tzaneen in the north to Belfast in the south; the Waterberg range that is in the middle of the Bushveld and the Soutpansberg range just north of Louis Trichardt. The latter is the northernmost mountain range in South Africa.

== Flora and fauna ==
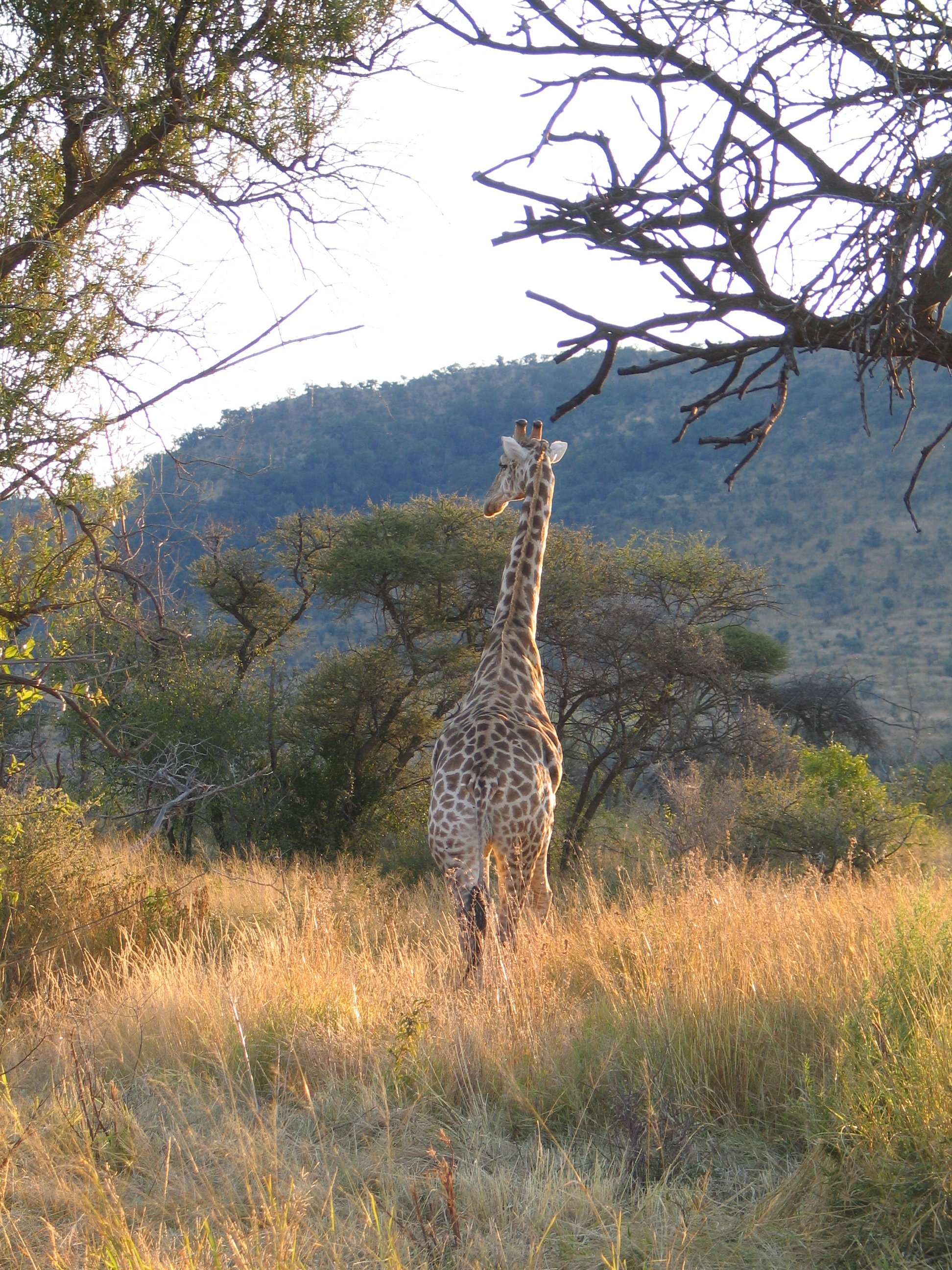
Flora and Fauna

As implied by the region's name, the Bushveld's grassy plains are dotted by dense clusters of trees and tall shrubs. The grasses found here are generally tall and turn brown or pale in winter (May to August), which is the dry season throughout most of Southern Africa. The undisturbed portions of this habitat, such as much of the Waterberg Biosphere, are home to many large mammal species including white rhino, black rhino, giraffe, blue wildebeest, kudu, impala and a variety of additional antelope species and other game.

== Geology ==
The Bushveld is one of the most mineral-rich regions of the world. This is due to the Bushveld igneous complex, an extremely rich saucer-shaped geological formation that stretches over more than 50,000 square kilometers. This formation contains most of the world's reserves of minerals such as andalusite, chromium, fluorspar, platinum and vanadium. The complex includes the Merensky Reef, which is the world's biggest source of platinum as well as platinum-group metals.

== Farming ==
As most of the region tends to be dry, the Bushveld is mostly beef cattle and game farming country, with only a few drought-resistant crops such as sorghum and millet being farmed, usually under irrigation.

== Middleveld ==
The term Middleveld is sometimes used to describe land lying between an elevation of 600 and 1,200 m (2,000 and 3,900 ft) and has been treated as synonymous with the term Bushveld.

== Towns and cities ==
Towns and cities in the region include:

- Beitbridge
- Bela Bela (formerly Warmbaths)
- Bulawayo
- Brits
- De Wildt
- Haenertsburg
- Hammanskraal
- Lephalale (formerly Ellisras)
- Louis Trichardt
- Mara
- Modimolle (formerly Nylstroom)
- Mokopane (formerly Potgietersrus)
- Mookgophong (formerly Naboomspruit)
- Musina (formerly Messina)
- Northam
- Phalaborwa
- Pienaarsrivier
- Polokwane (formerly Pietersburg)
- Roedtan
- Selebi-Phikwe
- Sun City
- Thabazimbi
- Tzaneen
- Vaalwater
- Vivo
- Zion City Moria
- Rustenburg
- Zvishavane

== See also ==
- Geography of South Africa
- Hlane Royal National Park
- Jock of the Bushveld
