= R516 (South Africa) =

Regional route in South Africa

Regional route R516

Route information
- Length: 169 km (105 mi)

Major junctions
- West end: R511 near Thabazimbi
- R101 in Bela-Bela; N1 near Bela-Bela; R33 near Tuinplaas
- East end: R519

Location
- Country: South Africa
- Major cities: Bela-Bela

Highway system
- Numbered routes of South Africa
← R515	→ R517

The R516 is a Regional Route in South Africa.

== Route ==
Taking its western origin from the R511 near Thabazimbi. The road runs east to Bela-Bela (Warmbaths), where it meets, and is briefly cosigned with, the R101. It crosses the N1, before the R576 coming from the east-south-east, meets it at a t-junction. The R516 continues east, but then starts to turn north-east, crossing the R33 and then ending its journey at the R519 between Mookgophong (Naboomspruit) and Roedtan.
