= Violet Semenya =

South African judge (born 1961)

The Honourable Violet Semenya

Deputy Judge President of the Limpopo High Court
- Incumbent
- Assumed office 1 July 2021
- Appointed by: Cyril Ramaphosa
- Judge President: Ephraim Makgoba; George Phatudi
- Preceded by: Fikile Mokgohloa

Judge of the High Court
- Incumbent
- Assumed office 30 January 2017
- Appointed by: Jacob Zuma
- Division: Limpopo

Personal details
- Born: 17 October 1961 (age 64) KwaThema, Springs; Transvaal, South Africa
- Education: Gojela High School
- Alma mater: University of the North; University of South Africa

Matsaro Violet Semenya (born 17 October 1961) is a South African judge who has been Deputy Judge President of the Limpopo High Court since July 2021. She was appointed that court as a puisne judge in January 2017. Before joining the judiciary, she was a magistrate in Limpopo between 1991 and 2017.

== Early life and education ==
Semenya was born on 17 October 1961 in KwaThema, a township outside Springs in the former Transvaal. She grew up in Mahwelereng, matriculating at Gojela High School in 1979. She studied law at the University of the North, completing a BJuris in 1985. Later, in 2003, she completed an LLB at the University of South Africa.

== Legal career ==
Shortly after her graduation from the University of the North, Semenya entered legal practice as a state prosecutor in the bantustan government of Lebowa, first at the magistrate's court in Mankweng and then at the magistrate's court in Mahwelereng. In 1991, she was appointed as a magistrate at the district court in Mahwelereng, and in 2003, she was promoted to senior magistrate at the magistrate's court in Seshego. Thereafter she served as regional court magistrate from 2004 until her elevation to the bench in early 2017.

In the magistrate's court, Semenya primarily heard criminal law matters. She was also an acting judge in the High Court of South Africa on several occasions, both in the North Gauteng Division and in the Limpopo Division.

== Limpopo High Court: 2017–present ==
In October 2016, Semenya was shortlisted for permanent appointment to the bench of the Limpopo Division. Although much of her interview was consumed by discussion of a lenient sentence she had handed a convicted rapist in the magistrate's court, the Judicial Service Commission recommended her for appointment, alongside Francis Kganyago, and she took office as a judge on 30 January 2017. She was the second female judge to be appointed to the Limpopo Division, and she was the only sitting female judge in the court after Fikile Mokgohloa was elevated.

In 2019, Semenya heard a traditional leadership dispute between the Thobejane family and the Limpopo Premier, which she dismissed after reversing herself on a point of non-joinder which she had formerly denied. The following year, the Supreme Court of Appeal upheld a decision against her judgement in Thobejane and Others v Premier of the Limpopo Province and Another, and the appellate judgment was highly critical of Semenya's handling of the matter.

=== Deputy judge presidency ===
In February 2021, the Judicial Service Commission announced that Semenya was one of three candidates who had been shortlisted for possible appointment to succeed Mokgohloa as Deputy Judge President of the Limpopo Division. The other candidates were Thifhelimbilu Phanuel Mudau and George Phatudi. Following interviews in April, the Judicial Service Commission recommended Semenya for the post, and President Cyril Ramaphosa confirmed her appointment with effect from 1 July 2021.

== Personal life ==
She has three adult children and is Christian.
