= Mogalakwena Solar Power Station =

Solar farm in South Africa

- Country: South Africa
- Location: Mokopane, Mogalakwena Municipality, Waterberg District, Limpopo Province, South Africa
- Coordinates: 23°58′32″S 28°56′24″E
- Status: Proposed
- Construction began: Q4 2022 Expected
- Commission date: Q4 2023 Expected

Solar farm
- Type: Flat-panel PV
- Thermal capacity: 240 GWh

Power generation
- Nameplate capacity: 100 MW (130,000 hp)

The Mogalakwena Solar Power Station is a planned 100 MW (130,000 hp) solar power plant in South Africa. The solar farm is under development by a consortium comprising Pele Green Energy, a South African independent power producer (IPP) and EDF Renewables, a subsidiary of the French energy multinational Électricité de France (EDF). The energy generated here will be used to supply the Mogalakwena platinum mine of Anglo American Platinum, in Limpopo Province.

== Location ==
The power station will be located in the town of Mokopane, in Mogalakwena Municipality, in Waterberg District, in the Limpopo Province of South Africa. The solar farm will sit on the campus of "Mogalakwena platinum mining complex", owned by Anglo American Platinum, the largest producer of platinum in the world.

The Mogalakwena mine is located about 30 kilometres (19 mi), north of Mokopane, the nearest town. This is approximately 125 kilometres (78 mi) northeast of Modimolle, the capital of Waterberg District. Mogalakwena Platinum Mine is located about 90 kilometres (56 mi) west of the city of Polokwane, the capital of Limpopo Province.

== Overview ==
Anglo American Platinum is in the process of reducing its global carbon footprint. As part of those efforts, the conglomerate, has plans to reach carbon neutrality by 2040. This renewable energy infrastructure project is one of the developments towards that goal. Construction is expected to start in the fourth quarter of 2022 and conclude in the fourth quarter of 2023.

Other ongoing efforts by the mining group include the production of "green hydrogen" at Mogalakwena. The hydrogen will then be used to power the rail system and possibly transport trucks and buses within the mine.

== Developers ==
Anglo American Platinum has selected the companies illustrated in the table below, to design and construct the power station. The developers are expected to form a special purpose vehicle company to carry out the task. For descriptive purposes we will call that company Mogalakwena Solar Power Consortium.

Mogalakwena Solar Power Consortium
Rank	Name of Owner	Domicile	Notes
1	Pele Green Energy	South Africa	
2	EDF Renewables	France	

== Other considerations ==
When the ownership documents are finalized, Anglo American Platinum has arranged, for a 10 percent shareholding to be assigned to a community trust (which does not have to contribute any capital), whereby any profits assigned to the trust will benefit the communities where Anglo American Platinum maintains operations.

== See also ==
- List of power stations in South Africa
- Exxaro Solar Power Station
