= R101 (South Africa) =

Regional Route in the Western Cape, Gauteng and Limpopo, South Africa

Regional route R101
- R101 route map

Location
- Country: South Africa

Highway system
- Numbered routes of South Africa
← R82	→ R102

The R101 is a Regional Route in South Africa that is the designation for some of the old sections of roads that were previously the N1, prior to upgrading. It only has 2 sections, from Bellville to Worcester and from Sandton to Polokwane.

== Western Cape ==
Regional route R101

Route information
- Length: 95.3 km (59.2 mi)

Major junctions
- West end: R102 in Bellville
- R300 in Brackenfell; R304 near Kraaifontein; R44 at Klapmuts; R45 / N1 in Paarl; R301 in Paarl; N1 near Rawsonville
- East end: N1 near Worcester

Location
- Country: South Africa

Highway system
- Numbered routes of South Africa
← R82	→ R102

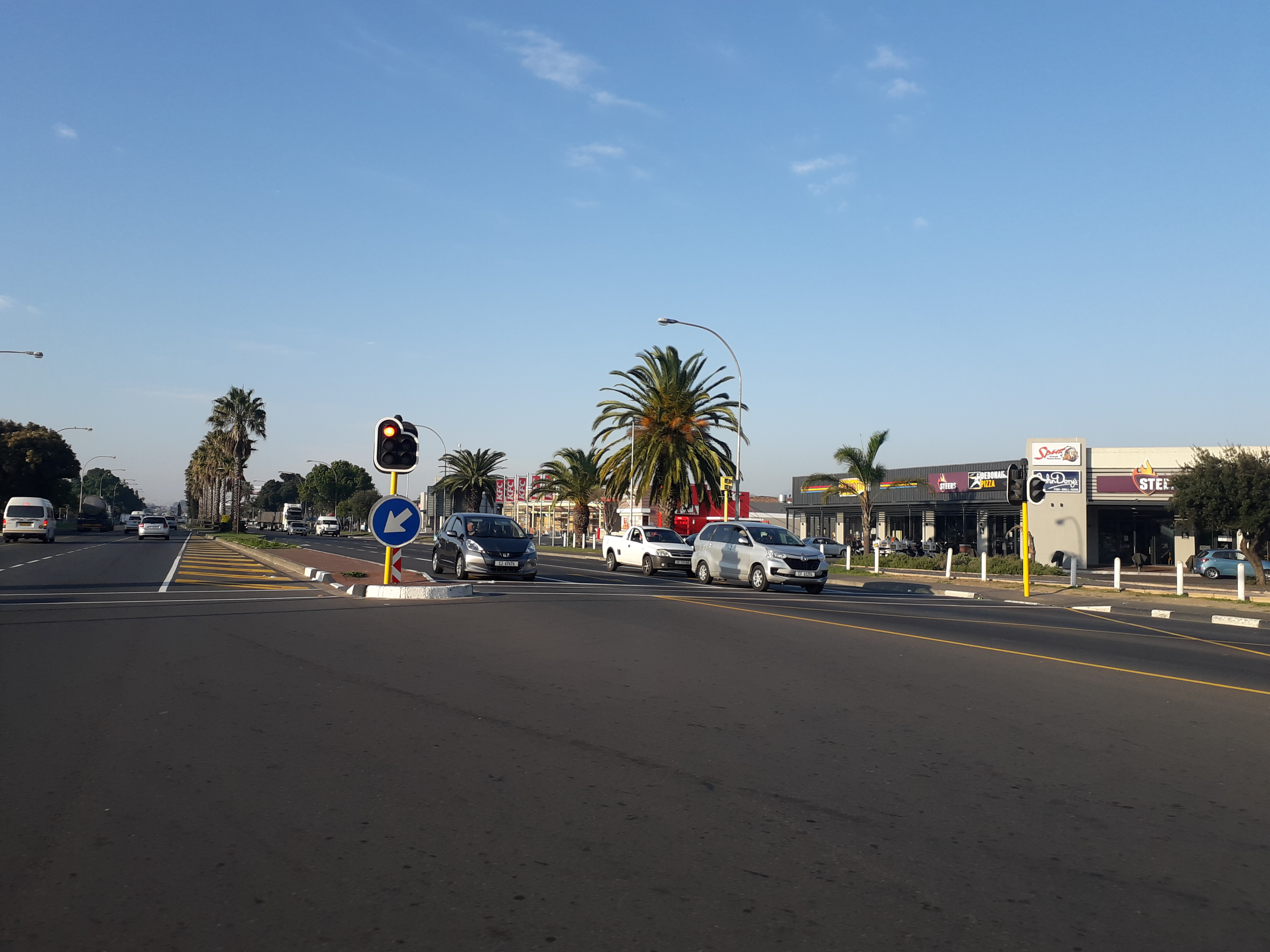
The R101 in Brackenfell, about 30 kilometres from Cape Town

The R101 starts in Bellville at a junction with the R102 (Voortrekker Road), running to the east parallel to the newer N1 freeway and is named Old Paarl Road. It then goes through Brackenfell before entering Kraaifontein as Voortrekker Road. At the intersection with Maroela Road in Kraaifontein East it is renamed Old Paarl Road before entering the Cape Winelands. In the Cape Winelands, it goes through Klapmuts (where it meets the R44) and then enters Paarl.

South of Paarl, the R101 is joined by the R45 to be co-signed for 6 kilometres northwards, crossing the N1 freeway, before separating from the R45 and turning right in the Paarl Central Business District (CBD). It meets the R301 in Paarl and proceeds to cross to the southern side of the N1 before it crosses the Drakenstein Mountains as Du Toitskloof Pass (820 m) where the newer N1 route bypasses as the Huguenot Tunnel.

Through the pass it rejoins the N1 for 8 km before it separates again to provide access to the town of Rawsonville. After bypassing Rawsonville, it joins the N1 again just west of Worcester, marking its end. The R101 designation is not used again up to Sandton to the north of Johannesburg, Gauteng, which is 1300 km from Worcester.

== Gauteng and Limpopo ==
Regional route R101

Route information
- Length: 327 km (203 mi)

Major junctions
- South end: R55 / M11 near Sandton
- R564 near Sandton; R562 in Midrand; N1 near Centurion; R114 in Centurion; N14 in Pretoria; R104 in Pretoria; R513 in Pretoria; R566 in Pretoria; R576 near Bela-Bela; R516 in Bela-Bela; R33 in Modimolle; N1 near Modimolle; R519 in Mookgophong; R520 in Mookgophong; N1 near Mookgophong; N11 / R518 in Mokopane; N1 near Mokopane; R519 near Polokwane; N1 in Polokwane; R567 in Polokwane; R37 in Polokwane; R71 in Polokwane; R521 in Polokwane
- North end: N1 in Polokwane

Location
- Country: South Africa

Highway system
- Numbered routes of South Africa
← R82	→ R102

The section of the R101 in Gauteng and Limpopo provinces connects Johannesburg with Polokwane via Pretoria, Bela Bela and Mokopane.

It begins in Sandton, north of Johannesburg. It comes from Johannesburg Central in the south as Louis Botha Avenue (designated as the M11) and at the R55 (Woodmead Road) junction near Woodmead, the M11 becomes the R101. Continuing northwards, the R101 meets the R564 and continues as Pretoria Main Road (later Old Pretoria Main Road) (east of the parallel Ben Schoeman Freeway, which is designated as the N1) to leave Sandton and enter Midrand, where it bypasses the Midrand CBD, Halfway House Estate and Grand Central Airport before meeting the R562 (Olifantsfontein Road; Winnie Madikizela-Mandela Road) in the suburb of Randjespark. It then leaves the City of Johannesburg Metropolitan Municipality and enters the City of Tshwane Metropolitan Municipality.

Its continues as the Old Johannesburg Road through the southern part of Centurion (where it crosses to the west of the Ben Schoeman Freeway, which is still designated as the N1). It then flies over the N14 highway and passes through the western side of Centurion (where it meets the north-eastern terminus of the R114 route) before changing names again to Jan Smuts Drive in Pretoria, where it merges with the northern endpoint of the Ben Schoeman Freeway (which is now labelled as the N14) at Kgosi Mampuru Street (formerly Potgieter Street), just after the Voortrekker Monument.

It proceeds northwards through Pretoria Central as Kgosi Mampuru Street (one-way street) (and as Sophie de Bruyn Street, formerly Schubart Street, southwards up to the N14 Ben Schoeman Freeway), intersecting with the R104 road during this time. It then meets the M4 metropolitan route (which connects to Hartbeespoort) before meeting the M22 metropolitan route. It becomes co-signed with the M22 eastwards up to a junction with Paul Kruger Street. While co-signed with the M22, it is Boom Street eastwards to Paul Kruger Street and Bloed Street westwards from Paul Kruger Street (one-way-streets).

As Paul Kruger Street, the R101 goes north, passing the Pretoria Zoo, through Capital Park and Mayville. Just after Mayville, the R101 is co-signed with the M1 metropolitan route until the next junction, where they meet the R513 route. Here, the M1 remains as Paul Kruger Street northwards (co-signed with the R513 West) while the R101 becomes Lavender Road, the road separating Wonderboom and Annlin West, via a right turn (co-signed with the R513 East). At the next junction with Steve Biko Road (M5 metropolitan route's northern terminus), Lavender Road divides into Lavender Road West (for vehicles heading north, by way of a left turn) and Lavender Road East (for vehicles heading south) for about 1 km up to the junction with Sefako Makgatho Drive (formerly Zambezi Drive), where the R513 becomes Sefako Makgatho Drive eastwards and the R101 remains as Lavender Road northwards (no-longer a one-way street).

Going north from the R513 junction, it passes by the Wonderboom Airport entrance and meets the eastern terminus of the R566 road (which connects to Onderstepoort and Rosslyn) before flying over the N4 highway (Platinum Highway) adjacent to the Bon Accord Dam. The R101, the R566 and the M1 form a ring-road around Annlin West. After crossing the N4, the R101 becomes Old Warmbaths Road and follows the Apies River north-north-east for 27 km, through Pyramid, to Hammanskraal.

6 km north of Hammanskraal, just before the Carousel casino, the R101 enters the North West Province for about 7 km before entering Limpopo. From Hammanskraal, it is parallel to the N1, passing through Pienaarsrivier (22 km from Hammanskraal). From Pienaarsrivier, the R101 makes a direct line for Bela Bela (Warmbaths) (35 km), where it meets the R516. The R101 continues by way of a right-turn at Potgieter Road in Bela Bela and the route makes a 27 km journey north-east to Modimolle (Nylstroom).

As a straight road passing through Modimolle central, it intersects with the R33. After passing the Phagameng suburb of Modimolle, the R101 turns east towards the bypassing N1 highway. At Middelfontein, right before the N1 Modimolle north off-ramp, the R101 becomes the road to the west of the N1 (Mookgophong Road, later Modimolle Road) heading north-east. After Kransvlei Farm Resort, the R101 continues by way of a left turn at the t-junction to become the straight road through Mookgophong (Namboomspruit). The distance from Modimolle to Mookgophong is 42 km.

Passing through Mookgophong as Thabo Mbeki Street, it intersects with the R519 at Second Avenue and the R520 at Nelson Mandela Drive. While mostly parallel to the N1, it journeys 51 km north-east to Mokopane (Potgietersrus). 7 km south of Mokopane, where it crosses the Mogalakwena River, the R101 is joined by the N11 national route to be co-signed for 11 kilometres north, becoming Thabo Mbeki Drive, up to Mokopane Central.

In Mokopane Central, next to Mokopane Mall, the R101 and N11 meet the R518 road from Zebediela and cosign with it. At the 2nd junction afterwards, the N11 and the R518 become Nelson Mandela Drive (by way of a left turn), leaving the R101 as the straight road through Mokopane North (Thabo Mbeki Drive). After the Mokopane Game Breeding Centre, the R101 turns eastwards to cross the bypassing N1 highway at its Mokopane North Off-ramp (Sebetiela Ramp Toll Plaza) and follow it north-east to Polokwane (40 km) while being on its eastern side.

As there is a Polokwane Eastern Bypass given to the N1 (opened in 2020), the old road through Polokwane Central (Thabo Mbeki Street and Grobler Street), meeting the northern terminus of the R37, meeting the western terminus of the R71, turning north and bypassing Polokwane International Airport (Landdros Mare Street), has been given to the R101.

The point where Landdros Mare Street and the Polokwane Eastern Bypass meet north of Polokwane marks the end of the R101, as the road heading north to the towns of Louis Trichardt, Musina and the border of Beit Bridge with Zimbabwe is given back to the N1.
