= Ga-Lekalakala =

- Location within Limpopo Location within South Africa
- Coordinates: 24.182°S 29.009°E
- Country: South Africa
- Province: Limpopo
- District: Waterberg
- Municipality: Mogalakwena

Area
  - Total: 9.43 km^{2} (3.64 sq mi)

Population (2011)
  - Total: 17,250
  - Density: 1,830/km^{2} (4,740/sq mi)

Racial makeup (2011)
  - Black African: 99.7%
  - Indian/Asian: 0.1%
  - Other: 0.2%

First languages (2011)
  - Northern Sotho: 67.3%
  - S. Ndebele: 19.5%
  - Sotho: 6.6%
  - Other: 6.6%
- Time zone: UTC+2 (SAST)

Ga-Lekalakala is a large, semi-urban rural township in the Mogalakwena Local Municipality of the Capricorn District Municipality of the Limpopo province in South Africa. It is located just 6,2 km north of the town of Mokopane on the N11 road.
