= Abbotspoort =

- Location within Limpopo Location within South Africa
- Coordinates: 23.453°S 28.093°E
- Country: South Africa
- Province: Limpopo
- District: Waterberg
- Municipality: Lephalale
- Main Place: Mapela

Area
  - Total: 2.55 km^{2} (0.98 sq mi)

Population (2011)
  - Total: 2,489
  - Density: 976/km^{2} (2,530/sq mi)

Racial makeup (2011)
  - Black African: 99.3%
  - Coloured: 0.2%
  - Indian/Asian: 0.0%
  - White: 0.2%
  - Other: 0.2%

First languages (2011)
  - Northern Sotho: 93.7%
  - Tswana: 1.3%
  - Afrikaans: 1.2%
  - Zulu: 1.0%
  - Other: 2.7%
- Time zone: UTC+2 (SAST)
- PO box: 0608

Abbotspoort is a town in Lephalale Local Municipality in the Limpopo province of South Africa.
