= Eseldrift =

- Location within Limpopo Location within South Africa
- Coordinates: 23.883°S 28.679°E
- Country: South Africa
- Province: Limpopo
- District: Waterberg
- Municipality: Mogalakwena

Area
  - Total: 1.31 km^{2} (0.51 sq mi)

Population (2001)
  - Total: 1,452
  - Density: 1,110/km^{2} (2,870/sq mi)
- Time zone: UTC+2 (SAST)

Eseldrift is a town in Waterberg District Municipality in the Limpopo province of South Africa.
