= Sterkwater =

- Location within Limpopo Location within South Africa
- Coordinates: 24.056°S 28.815°E
- Country: South Africa
- Province: Limpopo
- District: Waterberg
- Municipality: Mogalakwena

Area
  - Total: 2.39 km^{2} (0.92 sq mi)

Population (2011)
  - Total: 3,353
  - Density: 1,400/km^{2} (3,630/sq mi)

Racial makeup (2011)
  - Black African: 99.9%

First languages (2011)
  - Northern Sotho: 84.8%
  - Tsonga: 5.7%
  - S. Ndebele: 3.7%
  - Sotho: 2.5%
  - Other: 3.4%
- Time zone: UTC+2 (SAST)
- Postal code (street): 0602

Sterkwater (also known as Ga-Pila) is a town in Mogalakwena Local Municipality in the Limpopo province of South Africa.
