= Ga-Tshipana =

Ga-Tšhipana
- Location within Limpopo Location within South Africa
- Coordinates: 23.593°S 28.960°E
- Country: South Africa
- Province: Limpopo
- District: Waterberg
- Municipality: Mogalakwena

Area
  - Total: 1.07 km^{2} (0.41 sq mi)
- Elevation: 1,091 m (3,579 ft)

Population (2011)
  - Total: 933
  - Density: 872/km^{2} (2,260/sq mi)

Racial makeup (2011)
  - Black African: 99.6%
  - Indian/Asian: 0.1%
  - Other: 0.3%

First languages (2011)
  - Northern Sotho: 97.2%
  - Tsonga: 1.3%
  - Other: 1.5%
- Time zone: UTC+2 (SAST)
- Postal code (street): 0748
- Area code: +27 (0)15

Ga-Tšhipana is a village in Ga-Matlala in the Mogalakwena Local Municipality of the Waterberg District Municipality of the Limpopo province of South Africa. It is located 69 km northwest of the city Polokwane.
