= R576 (South Africa) =

Regional route in South Africa

Regional route R576

Route information
- Length: 22.6 km (14.0 mi)

Major junctions
- West end: R101 in Codrington
- N1 near Codrington
- East end: R516 near Settlers

Location
- Country: South Africa

Highway system
- Numbered routes of South Africa
← R575	→ R577

The R576 is a Regional Route in Limpopo, South Africa that connects Codrington with Settlers.

== Route ==
Its western terminus is a junction with the R101 at Codrington, approximately 18 kilometres south of Bela-Bela (Warmbaths) and 18 kilometres north of Pienaarsrivier. It heads east-north-east for 22 kilometres, crossing the N1 freeway, to end at an intersection with the R516 just west of Settlers.
