= Lyden =

- Location within Limpopo Location within South Africa
- Coordinates: 23.934°S 28.684°E
- Country: South Africa
- Province: Limpopo
- District: Waterberg
- Municipality: Mogalakwena

Area
  - Total: 3.28 km^{2} (1.27 sq mi)

Population (2011)
  - Total: 2,513
  - Density: 766/km^{2} (1,980/sq mi)

Racial makeup (2011)
  - Black African: 99.7%
  - Coloured: 0.1%
  - Other: 0.1%

First languages (2011)
  - Northern Sotho: 79.6%
  - Tsonga: 14.3%
  - Sotho: 3.5%
  - Other: 2.6%
- Time zone: UTC+2 (SAST)

Lyden is a town in Mogalakwena Local Municipality in the Limpopo province of South Africa.
