= Ga-Ramela =

- Location within Limpopo Location within South Africa
- Coordinates: 23.516°S 28.883°E
- Country: South Africa
- Province: Limpopo
- District: Waterberg
- Municipality: Mogalakwena

Area
  - Total: 2.73 km^{2} (1.05 sq mi)
- Elevation: 1,086 m (3,563 ft)

Population (2011)
  - Total: 1,938
  - Density: 710/km^{2} (1,840/sq mi)

Racial makeup (2011)
  - Black African: 99.8%
  - Other: 0.2%

First languages (2011)
  - Northern Sotho: 92.0%
  - Tsonga: 4.4%
  - Zulu: 1.1%
  - Other: 2.5%
- Time zone: UTC+2 (SAST)
- Postal code (street): 0748
- Area code: +27 (0)15

Ga-Ramela (formerly called Teneriffe) is a large village in Ga-Matlala in the Mogalakwena Local Municipality of the Waterberg District Municipality of the Limpopo province of South Africa. It is located 80 km northwest of Polokwane on the Matlala Road. Pre school :Mashika

== Education ==
- Ramela Primary School.
- Kgabedi Secondary School.
