= Tshamahansi =

- Location within Limpopo Location within South Africa
- Coordinates: 24.078°S 28.979°E
- Country: South Africa
- Province: Limpopo
- District: Waterberg
- Municipality: Mogalakwena

Area
  - Total: 6.21 km^{2} (2.40 sq mi)

Population (2011)
  - Total: 14,274
  - Density: 2,300/km^{2} (5,950/sq mi)

Racial makeup (2011)
  - Black African: 99.8%
  - Indian/Asian: 0.1%

First languages (2011)
  - Tsonga: 75.9%
  - Northern Sotho: 15.9%
  - S. Ndebele: 4.3%
  - Other: 3.9%
- Time zone: UTC+2 (SAST)
- PO box: 0659

Tshamahansi is a large, populated semi-urban rural township in the Mogalakwena Local Municipality of the Waterberg District Municipality of the Limpopo province in South Africa. It's located about 15,1 km north of the town of Mokopane on the N11 road.
