= Frans Kgomo =

Frans Kgomo may refer to:

- Frans Diale Kgomo (born 1947), South African judge of the Northern Cape High Court
- Nare Frans Kgomo (1950–2026), South African judge of the Limpopo High Court
