= Villa Nora =

- Location within Limpopo Location within South Africa
- Coordinates: 23.576°S 28.109°E
- Country: South Africa
- Province: Limpopo
- District: Waterberg
- Municipality: Lephalale
- Main Place: Shongoane

Area
  - Total: 1.54 km^{2} (0.59 sq mi)

Population (2011)
  - Total: 2,055
  - Density: 1,330/km^{2} (3,460/sq mi)

Racial makeup (2011)
  - Black African: 99.3%
  - Indian/Asian: 0.1%
  - White: 0.5%

First languages (2011)
  - Northern Sotho: 88.6%
  - Tswana: 6.6%
  - Sotho: 1.7%
  - Other: 3.1%
- Time zone: UTC+2 (SAST)
- PO box: 0607

Villa Nora is a town in Lephalale Local Municipality in the Limpopo province of South Africa.
