= Potgietersrus Commando =

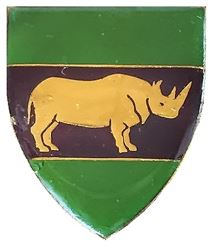
- Potgietersrus Commando emblem
- Country: South Africa
- Allegiance: Republic of South Africa; Republic of South Africa
- Branch: South African Army; South African Army
- Type: Infantry
- Role: Light Infantry
- Size: One Battalion
- Part of: South African Infantry Corps; Army Territorial Reserve
- Garrison/HQ: Potgietersrus

Potgietersrus Commando was a light infantry regiment of the South African Army. It formed part of the South African Army Infantry Formation as well as the South African Territorial Reserve.

== History ==
=== Origin ===
This unit has its origins with Geysers commando around 1914, although residents of the area have been members of other commandos since 1854, such as the Zoutpansberg Commando.

=== Operations ===
==== with the UDF ====
This commando was active during the 1914 Rebellion and was known as the Potgietersus Commando as early as 1925.

==== With the SADF ====
During this era, the unit was mainly engaged in area force protection, search and cordons as well as stock theft control assistance to the rural police.

This unit resorted under the command of the SADF's Group 14.

==== With the SANDF ====
===== Amalgamation =====
This unit eventually amalgamated with the Springbokvlaktes Commando but retained its name around 1997.

===== Disbandment =====
This combined unit, along with all other Commando units was disbanded after a decision by South African President Thabo Mbeki to disband all Commando Units. The Commando system was phased out between 2003 and 2008 "because of the role it played in the apartheid era", according to the Minister of Safety and Security Charles Nqakula.

== Unit Insignia ==
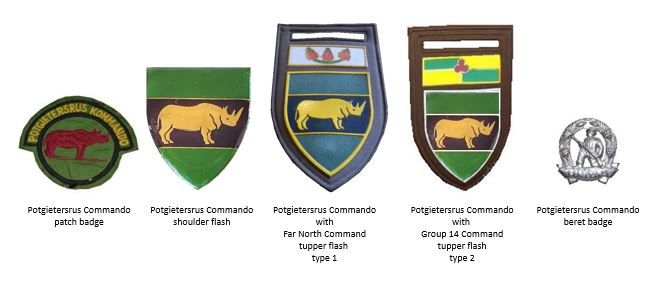
SADF era Potgietersrus Commando insignia

== See also ==
- South African Commando System
