= R516 road =

R516 road may refer to:

- R516 road (Ireland)
- R516 (South Africa)
