= Middeldrift, Limpopo =

Middeldrift
- Location within Limpopo Location within South Africa
- Coordinates: 24.795°S 27.405°E
- Country: South Africa
- Province: Limpopo
- District: Waterberg
- Municipality: Thabazimbi

Area
  - Total: 1.49 km^{2} (0.58 sq mi)

Population (2011)
  - Total: 2,391
  - Density: 1,600/km^{2} (4,160/sq mi)

Racial makeup (2011)
  - Black African: 43.2%
  - Coloured: 2.7%
  - White: 54.1%

First languages (2011)
  - Afrikaans: 54.7%
  - Tswana: 14.5%
  - Sotho: 6.4%
  - Tsonga: 5.1%
  - Other: 19.3%
- Time zone: UTC+2 (SAST)

Middeldrift is a village in Waterberg District Municipality in the Limpopo province of South Africa.

The village lies 52 km south of Thabazimbi in the platinum and chromium mine area. The town's new name is shown on Google Maps as Setaria.
