= R520 (South Africa) =

Regional route in South Africa

Regional route R520

Location
- Country: South Africa

Highway system
- Numbered routes of South Africa
← R519	→ R521

The R520 is a Regional Route in South Africa.

== Route ==
It starts in the town of Mookgophong from the R101 and runs north-west to the village of Vanalphensvlei.
