= R519 road =

R519 road may refer to:

- R519 road (Ireland)
- R519 (South Africa)
