= Sekgakgapeng =

- Location within Limpopo Location within South Africa
- Coordinates: 24.111°S 29.046°E
- Country: South Africa
- Province: Limpopo
- District: Waterberg
- Municipality: Mogalakwena

Area
  - Total: 4.64 km^{2} (1.79 sq mi)

Population (2011)
  - Total: 11,979
  - Density: 2,580/km^{2} (6,690/sq mi)

Racial makeup (2011)
  - Black African: 99.5%
  - Coloured: 0.1%
  - Indian/Asian: 0.2%
  - Other: 0.1%

First languages (2011)
  - Northern Sotho: 65.4%
  - S. Ndebele: 21.8%
  - Sotho: 6.2%
  - Tsonga: 1.5%
  - Other: 5.2%
- Time zone: UTC+2 (SAST)
- PO box: 0651
- Area code: 015

Sekgakgapeng is a large, semi-urban rural township located just north of Mokopane on the N11 road in the Waterberg district of the Limpopo province of South Africa.

The settlement has grown to increasingly encroach into the town of Mokopane, previously known as Potgietersrus. Therefore, the settlement of Sekgakgapeng provides a convenient residential location to those seeking work opportunities in the nearby Mokopane and Mahwelereng.

== Notable people ==
Notable people from Sekgakgapeng include:

- Matshela Koko - Former CEO of Eskom

== Features ==
Notable features in Sekgakgapeng include a mountain painted with the word Jesus and the River of Mogalakwena, used as a fishing spot by locals.

== Service delivery ==
Sekgakgapeng has long suffered from service delivery backlogs, including roads, water, sanitation, and waste management. Lack of opportunities in the area has led to social ills that include teenage drug abuse, house breaking, and other forms of criminal deviant behaviours.

Notable progress include electrification programmes and water reticulation. A new clinic called Manyonga Clinic was opened in 2019 ^{1}

The private sector has invested some retail facilities in the area, for example Shoprite, further easing the cost of traveling to the nearby town. But this has had a negative impact on small retailers in the area. Mining companies have taken interest in the area. Ivanplats, a platinum mining company, supports science and technology related initiatives in schools ^{2}.

The use of animal drawn carts, mainly donkeys, remains prevalent in the area. The donkey carts are used to collect and deliver groceries for the locals. The flat terrain makes Sekgakgapeng easy for this form of transport and cycling.
