= George Phatudi =

South African judge (born 1959)

The Honourable George Phatudi

Judge President of the Limpopo High Court
- Incumbent
- Assumed office 1 December 2023
- Appointed by: Cyril Ramaphosa
- Deputy: Violet Semenya
- Preceded by: Ephraim Makgoba

Judge of the High Court
- Incumbent
- Assumed office 1 July 2016
- Appointed by: Jacob Zuma
- Division: Limpopo

Personal details
- Born: Moletje George Phatudi; 8 March 1959 (age 67)
- Education: University of the North; University of Pretoria

Moletje George Phatudi (born 8 March 1959) is a South African judge who has been Judge President of the Limpopo High Court since 1 December 2023. He joined that court in July 2016 as a puisne judge. Before that, he was an advocate, attorney, and lecturer at the University of the North.

== Early life and education ==
Phatudi was born on 8 March 1959. He studied law at the University of the North, where he was president of the student representative council, completing a BJuris in 1984 and an LLB in 1988. He later completed an LLM at the University of Pretoria in 1995.

== Legal and academic career ==
While studying towards his LLB, Phatudi was a legal adviser to Anglo-American Property Services from 1986 to 1987. After his graduation, he remained at his alma mater as a lecturer in law from 1989 to 1995. In 1996, he returned to private practice, first as an advocate until 1999 and thereafter as an attorney and director of his own firm, M. G. Phatudi Incorporated.

He was also a commissioner in the Commission for Conciliation, Mediation and Arbitration from 1996 to 2000, and he was an acting judge in the Gauteng Division and Limpopo Division of the High Court of South Africa on several occasions between 2013 and 2016.

== Limpopo High Court: 2016–present ==
In April 2016, the Judicial Service Commission interviewed Phatudi as a candidate for permanent appointment to the recently established Limpopo Division. Julius Malema, a member of the commission, pressed Phatudi on his business interests and political affiliations, in particular about his former membership in the African National Congress. The Judicial Service Commission recommended Phatudi and Gerrit Muller for the vacancies, and President Jacob Zuma confirmed their appointment with effect from 1 July 2016.

In 2017, Phatudi presided in a high-profile case involving Pastor Lethebo Rabalago, the so-called Doom Pastor, and his church, the Mount Zion General Assembly; he granted an interdict prohibiting the pastor from treating his congregants with Doom insecticide.

=== Nominations to deputy judge presidency ===
Between February and June 2019, Phatudi stood in for Fikile Mokgohloa as acting Deputy Judge President of the Limpopo Division. Thereafter he was twice shortlisted unsuccessfully for appointment to succeed Mokgohloa permanently: first in August 2019 as one of four candidates, though he withdrew from contention on that occasion, and then in April 2021 as one of three candidates.

=== Judge presidency ===
In July 2022, the Judicial Service Commission announced that Phatudi was one of three candidates shortlisted for possible appointment to succeed Ephraim Makgoba as Judge President of the Limpopo Division. The other candidates were Legodi Phatudi and Maake Kganyago. Following the interviews in October 2022, the Judicial Service Commission recommended Phatudi for appointment.

A group of lawyers in Limpopo, the Amalgamated Lawyers Association, objected to his appointment, lodging an application in the Pretoria High Court and a complaint with President Cyril Ramaphosa. The same group also alleged that Phatudi had attempted improperly to block the appointment of Violet Semenya as Limpopo Deputy Judge President.
