= Mapela =

Mapela may refer to:

- Mapela, Zimbabwe
- Mapela, South Africa
