= Exxaro Solar Power Station =

Solar farm in South Africa

- Country: South Africa
- Location: Lephalale, Waterberg District, Limpopo Province, South Africa
- Coordinates: 23°41′02″S 27°34′23″E
- Status: Proposed
- Construction began: 1 January 2022 Expected
- Commission date: 1 January 2023 Expected
- Owner: Exxaro Resources Limited

Solar farm
- Type: Flat-panel PV
- Thermal capacity: 180 GWh

Power generation
- Nameplate capacity: 70 MW (94,000 hp)

The Exxaro Solar Power Station, also Lephalale Solar Power Station, is a planned 80 MW (110,000 hp) solar power plant in South Africa. The solar farm is under development by Cennergi, a subsidiary of Exxaro Resources Limited, a South African multinational mining group, active in Africa, Asia, Australia and Europe. The power generated here will be sold to Exxaro Coal Plc, for use in their coal mine at Grootegeluk, under a long-term power purchase agreement (PPA), between the two Exxaro subsidiaries. The expected benefits to the group include (a) reduction of the group's carbon footprint (b) financial savings on energy acquisition and utilization and (c) to provide green, secure and sustainable electricity for mine operations at Grootegeluk Coal Mine.

== Location ==
The power station will be located in the town of Lephalale, in Waterberg District, in Limpopo Province of South Africa. The solar farm will sit on the "Grootegeluk mining complex", which employs in excess of 2,000 people.

The Grootegeluk mine is located about 21.5 kilometres (13 mi), west of Lephalale, the nearest town. This is approximately 176 kilometres (109 mi) northwest of Modimolle, the capital of Waterberg District. Grootegeluk Coal Mine is located about 246 kilometres (153 mi) west of the city of Polokwane, the capital of Limpopo Province.

== Overview ==
Exxaro Resources Limited, is in the process of integrating green energy sources into its mining processes at a number of its coal mines, Grootegeluk being the first. The mining group is also diversifying into "cleaner" minerals, including bauxite, copper and manganese. Switching to solar-powered electricity at Grootegeluk is expected to reduce the mine's carbon emissions by 35 percent.

== Other considerations ==
Cennergi, an IPP, is 100 percent owned by Exxaro Resources Limited. The IPP already operates and manages the Tsitsikamma Community Wind Power Station (95 megawatts) and the Amakhala Emoyeni Wind Power Station (134 megawatts). Both wind farms are located in Eastern Cape Province.

== Developments ==
In June 2022, the National Energy Regulator of South Africa (NERSA) gave its official approval to Cennergi, for the IPP to proceed with this development of an 80 megawatts power station. Exxaro, the parent conglomerate, plans to achieve carbon neutrality by 2050.

== See also ==
- List of power stations in South Africa
- Mogalakwena Solar Power Station
