= Mahwelereng =

- Location within Limpopo Location within South Africa
- Coordinates: 24°09′S 28°59′E
- Country: South Africa
- Province: Limpopo
- District: Waterberg
- Municipality: Mogalakwena

Area
  - Total: 11.55 km^{2} (4.46 sq mi)

Population (2011)
  - Total: 41,072
  - Density: 3,556/km^{2} (9,210/sq mi)

Racial makeup (2011)
  - Black African: 99.4%
  - Coloured: 0.1%
  - Indian/Asian: 0.1%
  - White: 0.1%
  - Other: 0.3%

First languages (2011)
  - Northern Sotho: 75.7%
  - Tsonga: 6.7%
  - S. Ndebele: 6.1%
  - Sotho: 3.7%
  - Other: 7.8%
- Time zone: UTC+2 (SAST)
- Postal code (street): 0626
- PO box: 0626
- Area code: 015

Mahwelereng is a township in the Mogalakwena Local Municipality of the Waterberg District Municipality of the Limpopo Province of South Africa, It is about 2 km from Mokopane. The township is a product of Apartheid South Africa's policies in the former Bantustan of Lebowa. Most of the original residents of Mahwelereng were from an area which old residents call "Ol' Location". Ol' Location was too close to town and the residents had to be moved further away from town. There are still remnants of Ol' Location such as the "Bar" and the Lutheran Church Mission on the Sekgakgapeng site. The township is bordered by Sekgakgapeng, Mountainview, Moshate, Phola Park, and Ga-Madiba.

== Background ==
The township grew rapidly as a result of urbanization, as it afforded job opportunities in an area largely surrounded by rural settlements. The lack of affordable housing stock has also led to an increase in informal housing. The name Mahwelereng (meaning place of Mohwelere trees) is derived from the name of a tree referred to in the Northern Sotho language as "Mohwelere".

It was a well-planned township with a sound infrastructure. The water drainage system was comparable to that of most towns, and there were lights on every street. However, the township lacks tarred roads and a reliable electricity supply. Roads are maintained with gravel mined locally next to the current Mahwelereng Stadium, known as "Lekgethe".

The original housing units comprised two-, four- and five-room houses and a few seven-room houses. These sections gave rise to the names of these particular areas. The "Di-Five" area has larger houses reserved for high-ranking government employees. Most of these five-room houses had 2 bedrooms, a lounge/dining room, a kitchen, and a toilet. Over time, however, some of the original houses were demolished by the owners to make room for larger homes; this was most often done by government employees who received housing subsidies. The "Di-Four" area has predominantly four-room houses, which included two bedrooms, a lounge/dining room, a kitchen and a toilet on the outside; some were flush toilets and some were not. The "Di-Two" area has a mix of four-room houses and two-room houses. The two-room houses had one bedroom and one kitchen-cum-lounge-cum-bedroom, with a non-flush toilet on the outside. Di-Two had a notorious section called Phadima Section.

The locals mainly speak Northern Sotho but a significant number also speak Xitsonga and a Ndebele dialect.

== Landmarks ==
Hotel Mahwelereng served as an entertainment and meeting place for society's upper crust. The motel was closed down after the owner fell behind on his taxes. However, the structure is still standing.

Mokopane Hospital, formerly known as Refilwe Hospital, is one of three hospitals in Mokopane and the surrounding region, the other two being Voortrekker and George Masebe. A network of tiny neighborhood clinics assists the hospital.

Mahwelereng Stadium, which was designed primarily for soccer activities, has been used as a multi-purpose arena. The Waterberg mountain range includes Sefakaola Mountain.

== Business ==
The Central Business District, also called "Dišopong" by locals, is the main shopping district for the area situated next to Hotel Mahwelereng. Most shop owners who were removed from the Old Location started afresh here. It housed a dairy store, a butchery, a fruit and vegetable market, supermarkets, a bookstore, a hospital, a pharmacy, post office, a community hall, and some government offices. The Central Business District has since been weakened by the geographic expansion of the community and the proliferation of informal home-run shops referred to by locals as Spaza shops. Young entrepreneurs have taken over, running braai butcheries ("shisanyama"), hair salons, and cash loans; however, as the main town of Potgietersrus is only 2 km away, most of these businesspeople have a small income. As of May 2021, the township has Mahwelereng Shopping Center next to the Gadone filling station.

== Education ==
During the Bantustan times, Mahwelereng was one of the centers of education within Lebowa. The Mokopane Teachers Training College, renamed Mokopane College of Education, is located here. Most of the teachers in the province of Limpopo as well as from the then PWV area, graduated from this college. It was initially called Mokopane-Sefakaola incorporating a High School which gave birth to Gojela High School.It was built in an area called Di-Five by the locals, but in 1991 it moved to newly built premises next to the Mokopane Hospital. It was later converted to a Further Education and Training College.

Schools in Mahwelereng include the primary schools Nomalema, Ithuteng, Raphela, Nonchimudi, ND Mokonyane, Maakamaleka and Segoakgala LP, and the high schools Ebenezer, Gojela, DG Tsebe, and E.D.L Rampola and Fred Ledwaba Comprehensive School.

Like many townships in Limpopo Province, Mahwelereng has produced several notable South African leaders (including Mosibudi Mangena AZAPO president), although the area has a backlog of basic municipal services.

== Sports ==
The local softball team Mahwelereng Spikes was established in September 1976.

Vultures Cricket Club dominates the district as far as Modimolle and had potential Protea players such as Samuel Manganya, who was a skilled left-hander and showed no mercy to bowlers. Even with players such as Manganya, the team could not sustain the club due to the lack of infrastructure and of necessary support from their local government.

Mahwelereng is the home of the now-defunct Mahwelereng Real Rovers, which was formed in 1975 and later promoted to the Premier Soccer League (PSL).

There are other sporting activities in the area including boxing, karate, dancing and music.
