= Middeldrift =

Middeldrift may refer to:

- Middledrift, Eastern Cape, South Africa
- Middeldrift, Limpopo, South Africa
