= Springbok Flats =

Coordinates: 24°36′S 29°05′E

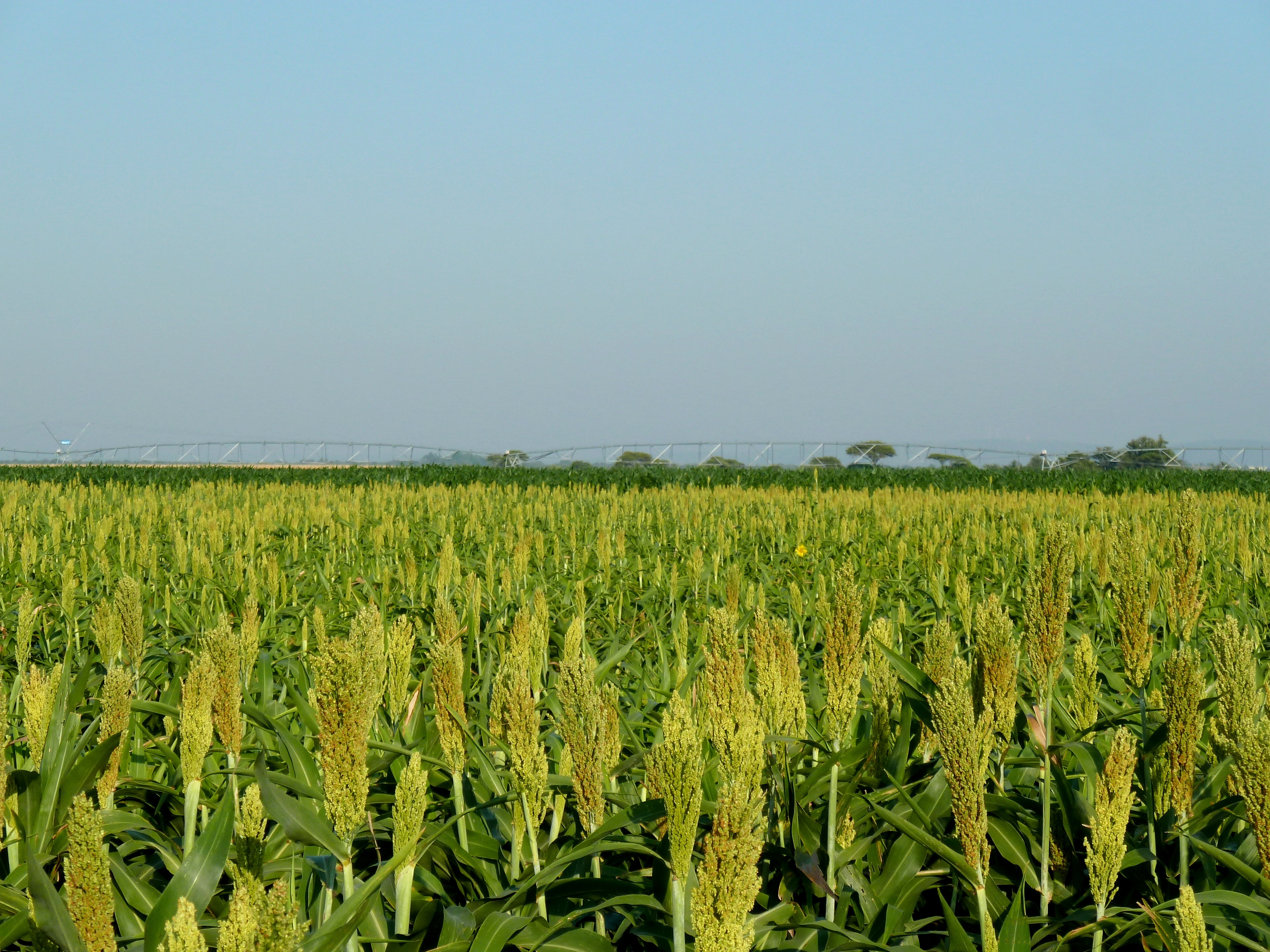
Sorghum (Sorghum bicolor) and maize fields under center pivot irrigation on the Springbok Flats

The Springbok Flats is an extensive plain situated in Limpopo, South Africa. The southern boundary is the Pienaars River which intersects the N1 main road between Pretoria and Polokwane. To the west it includes the towns of Bela-Bela, Modimolle, Mookgophong and Mokopane. Towards the east it includes the towns Roedtan, Crecy, Marolong, Nutfield, Tuinplaas and Settlers. The 80 km wide and 130 km long swath of land is orientated in a northeasterly direction and is centered on Roedtan.

Subsequent to the Boer War the area became accessible as a farming region. Grasslands made way for crop fields or became covered in acacia scrub. Large areas are currently under crop cultivation, including wheat, maize, cotton, sorghum, peanuts and sunflowers. Irrigated citrus orchards have been established. Several game farms have to some measure reestablished the game diversity that existed here at the end of the 19th century.

The plain which is exceptionally flat and situated at an altitude of 1,000m above sea level, is subject to warm summers (shielded from cold winds by surrounding uplands) and dry winters. An annual rainfall of about 620 mm is the norm. Its vertisols are considered very fertile.

Coal and uranium reserves are to be found in its sediments.
