= Onverwacht =

Onverwacht (Dutch and Afrikaans for 'unexpected') may refer to:

- Onverwacht, Suriname, a town in Suriname;
- Onverwacht, Limpopo, a town in the Limpopo province of South Africa;
- Onverwacht, Gauteng, a town in the Gauteng province of South Africa;
- Onverwacht series, a greenstone mountain formation from the Archean eon.
