= Amandelbult =

- Location within Limpopo Location within South Africa
- Coordinates: 24.818°S 27.295°E
- Country: South Africa
- Province: Limpopo
- District: Waterberg
- Municipality: Thabazimbi

Area
  - Total: 41.53 km^{2} (16.03 sq mi)

Population (2011)
  - Total: 113
  - Density: 2.72/km^{2} (7.05/sq mi)

Racial makeup (2011)
  - Black African: 99.1%
  - Other: 0.9%

First languages (2011)
  - Tswana: 36.3%
  - Tsonga: 23.9%
  - Northern Sotho: 14.2%
  - Sotho: 5.3%
  - Other: 20.4%
- Time zone: UTC+2 (SAST)
- PO box: 0362
- Area code: 014

Amandelbult is a town in Waterberg District Municipality in the Limpopo province of South Africa.
