= Ga-Madiba =

- Location within Limpopo Location within South Africa
- Coordinates: 24.181°S 29.008°E
- Country: South Africa
- Province: Limpopo
- District: Waterberg
- Municipality: Mogalakwena

Area
  - Total: 4.02 km^{2} (1.55 sq mi)

Population (2011)
  - Total: 8,523
  - Density: 2,120/km^{2} (5,490/sq mi)

Racial makeup (2011)
  - Black African: 99.7%
  - Indian/Asian: 0.1%
  - White: 0.1%

First languages (2011)
  - Northern Sotho: 54.0%
  - N. Ndebele: 38.3%
  - Tsonga: 2.1%
  - Zulu: 1.1%
  - Other: 4.5%
- Time zone: UTC+2 (SAST)

Ga-Madiba is a large village in the Mogalakwena Local Municipality of the Waterberg District Municipality of the Limpopo province in South Africa. It's located just 8 km north of the town of Mokopane on the N11 road.

== Schools ==
=== Primary ===
- Lešoba.
- Kgatabela.

=== Secondary ===
- Ntata.
- kgaba
