= Northam, South Africa =

Northam
- Location within Limpopo Location within South Africa
- Coordinates: 24.950°S 27.266°E
- Country: South Africa
- Province: Limpopo
- District: Waterberg
- Municipality: Thabazimbi

Government
  - Councillor: Judy Mogale (ANC)

Area
  - Total: 3.54 km^{2} (1.37 sq mi)

Population (2011)
  - Total: 2,381
  - Density: 673/km^{2} (1,740/sq mi)

Racial makeup (2011)
  - Black African: 83.5%
  - Coloured: 2.1%
  - Indian/Asian: 1.1%
  - White: 12.6%
  - Other: 0.8%

First languages (2011)
  - Tswana: 42.2%
  - Afrikaans: 14.7%
  - English: 8.1%
  - Northern Sotho: 6.8%
  - Other: 28.2%
- Time zone: UTC+2 (SAST)
- Postal code (street): 0360
- PO box: 0360
- Area code: 014

Northam is a town in the Waterberg District Municipality in the Limpopo province of South Africa. It is approximately 54 km south of Thabazimbi on the R510 road.

== History ==
The town was proclaimed in 1946 by E.H.J. Fulls on the farm Leeukoppie, which belonged to H. Herd, and was originally one of a number of farms allocated to British veterans of the Anglo-Boer war.

== Economy ==
There are chrome and platinum mines in the area surrounding the town.

== Culture and contemporary life ==
Northam is also home to the South African music festival Oppikoppi, which attracts hundreds of artists and thousands of fans every year in August.
