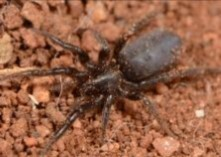
- Female
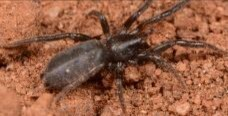
- Female

Scientific classification
- Kingdom: Animalia
- Phylum: Arthropoda
- Subphylum: Chelicerata
- Class: Arachnida
- Order: Araneae
- Infraorder: Araneomorphae
- Family: Gnaphosidae
- Genus: Zelotes
- Species: Z. lavus

Binomial name
- Zelotes lavus Tucker, 1923

= Zelotes lavus =

Beaufort West Dark Ground Spider

Species of spider

Zelotes lavus is a species of spider in the family Gnaphosidae. It is found in southern Africa and is commonly known as the Beaufort west dark ground spider.

== Distribution ==
Zelotes lavus occurs in Namibia, Zimbabwe, and South Africa. In South Africa, it is recorded from seven provinces: Free State, Gauteng, KwaZulu-Natal, Limpopo, Northern Cape, North West, and Western Cape. The species occurs at altitudes ranging from 140 to 1,758 m above sea level.

Collection localities include Amanzi Private Game Reserve, Boshof, Florisbad Research Station, Pretoria, Roodepoort, Irene, Ndumo Game Reserve, Springbok Flats, Malebogo Nature Reserve, Augrabies Falls National Park, Benfontein Nature Reserve, De Aar, Kimberley, Barberspan, Beaufort West, and Karoo National Park.

== Habitat and ecology ==
Zelotes lavus are free-running spiders found under stones during the day. The species has been sampled from the Grassland and Savanna biomes.

== Conservation ==
Zelotes lavus is listed as Least Concern by the South African National Biodiversity Institute due to its wide range. There are no significant threats to the species, and it is protected in six protected areas.

== Taxonomy ==
The species was described by Tucker in 1923 from Beaufort West in the Western Cape. FitzPatrick's 2007 revision provided additional morphological details. The species is known from both sexes.
