= R519 (South Africa) =

Regional route in South Africa

Regional route R519

Route information
- Length: 128 km (80 mi)

Major junctions
- South end: R101 in Mookgophong
- N1 near Mookgophong; R516; N11 in Roedtan; R518 near Mathibela
- North end: R101 near Polokwane

Location
- Country: South Africa
- Major cities: Mookgophong, Roedtan, Polokwane

Highway system
- Numbered routes of South Africa
← R518	→ R520

The R519 is a Regional Route in South Africa.

== Route ==
Its western terminus is Mookgophong (Naboomspruit), where it takes origin from the R101. It heads south-east crossing the N1, until it meets the northern end of the R516. Thereafter it continues east to Roedtan where it crosses the N11 at a staggered junction. It then takes on a north-easterly direction, crossing the R518 near Zebediela. It ends its journey by joining the R101 just outside Polokwane (Pietersburg).
