= Frans Kgomo (Limpopo judge) =

South African judge (1950–2026)

The Honourable Frans Kgomo

Judge of the High Court
- In office 1 May 2008 – 1 October 2022
- Appointed by: Thabo Mbeki
- Division: Gauteng Division; Limpopo Division

Personal details
- Born: Nare Frans Kgomo; 13 November 1950
- Died: 19 September 2026 (aged 75)

Nare Frans Kgomo (13 November 1950 – 19 September 2026) was a South African judge of the High Court of South Africa. He served in the Limpopo Division of the High Court, but he joined the bench on 1 May 2008 as a judge of the Gauteng Division, following his shortlisting for that position in February 2008. Sitting in the Johannesburg High Court in 2010, Kgomo heard the Brett Kebble murder trial and dismissed the murder charges against Glenn Agliotti.

In April 2015, ahead of the appointment of the new Limpopo Division, Kgomo was one of seven candidates whom the Judicial Service Commission shortlisted and interviewed for possible appointment as inaugural Judge President of the new division. He was not recommended for the post, which instead went to Ephraim Makgoba, under whom Kgomo had worked as a young attorney.

A year later, in April 2016, Kgomo was one of three candidates – the others being Legodi Phatudi and Fikile Mokgohloa – shortlisted and interviewed for possible appointment as Deputy Judge President of the Limpopo Division. During that interview, Judicial Service Commission member Julius Malema accused Kgomo of being "sexist" after he commented that retention of women judges was low because women lawyers were attracted to civil service positions that came with "expensive motor vehicles". Mokgohloa was appointed to the deputy judge presidency instead.

In 2023, GroundUp reported that two of Kgomo's judgments in the Thohoyandou High Court had been outstanding for over three years.

Kgomo died on 19 September 2026, at the age of 75.
