= Bela-Bela Local Municipality =

Bela-Bela
- Local municipality
- Seal

- Location in Limpopo
- Coordinates: 24°55′S 28°15′E
- Country: South Africa
- Province: Limpopo
- District: Waterberg
- Seat: Bela-Bela
- Wards: 9

Government
  - Type: Municipal council
  - Mayor: Gloria Modiegi Seleka

Area
  - Total: 3,406 km^{2} (1,315 sq mi)

Population (2011)
  - Total: 66,500
  - Density: 19.5/km^{2} (50.6/sq mi)

Racial makeup (2011)
  - Black African: 84.8%
  - Coloured: 1.5%
  - Indian/Asian: 0.6%
  - White: 12.9%

First languages (2011)
  - Northern Sotho: 38.4%
  - Tswana: 16.7%
  - Afrikaans: 13.5%
  - Tsonga: 10.6%
  - Other: 20.8%
- Time zone: UTC+2 (SAST)
- Municipal code: LIM366

Bela-Bela Municipality (Northern Sotho: Mmasepala wa Bela-Bela; Tswana: Mmaspala wa Bela-Bela; Afrikaans: Bela-Bela Munisipaliteit; Tsonga: Masipala wa Bela-Bela) is a local municipality within the Waterberg District Municipality, in the Limpopo province of South Africa. The seat is Bela-Bela. The municipality lies north of Hammanskraal. It is the only municipality in South Africa that straddles 4 provinces.

Bela is a Setswana word meaning "to boil", referring to the hot water springs found in the area.

== Main places ==
The 2011 census divided the municipality into the following main places:

Place	Code	Area (km^{2})	Population
Bela-Bela	981003	23.29	45,001
Bela-Bela NU	981002	3,373.73	13,616
Pienaarsrivier	981009	2.06	1,897
Rapotokwane	981007	2.17	2,787
Rust De Winter	981008	0.38	105
Settlers	981005	1.17	819
Vingerkraal	981001	1.14	827
Welgegund Village	981006	1.94	1,448

== Politics ==
The municipal council consists of seventeen members elected by mixed-member proportional representation. Nine councillors are elected by a system of first-past-the-post voting in nine wards, while the remaining eight are chosen from party lists so that the total number of party representatives is proportional to the number of votes received. In the election of 1 November 2021, the African National Congress (ANC) won a majority of ten seats on the council. The following table shows the results of the election.

Party	Ward			List			Total seats
Party	Votes	%	Seats	Votes	%	Seats	Total seats
African National Congress	8,470	54.81	8	8,730	56.84	2	10
Democratic Alliance	2,666	17.25	1	2,691	17.52	2	3
Economic Freedom Fighters	1,633	10.57	0	1,860	12.11	2	2
Freedom Front Plus	1,099	7.11	0	1,132	7.37	1	1
Better Residents Association	393	2.54	0	363	2.36	1	1
Independent candidates	627	4.06	0				0
6 other parties	566	3.66	0	582	3.79	0	0
Total	15,454	100.00	9	15,358	100.00	8	17
Valid votes	15,454	98.73		15,358	98.17		
Invalid/blank votes	199	1.27		287	1.83		
Total votes	15,653	100.00		15,645	100.00		
Registered voters/turnout	31,267	50.06		31,267	50.04		
