= Thorntree Academy =

- Thorntree Preparatory School
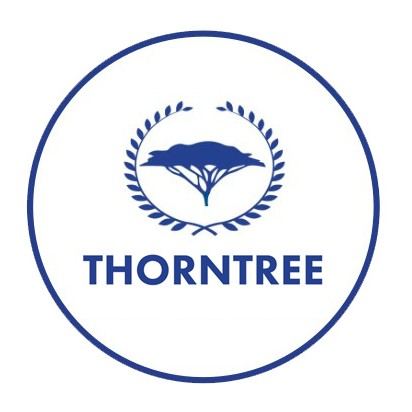

Location
- Mokopane, Limpopo, 0601; South Africa; 24.1911°S 29.0052°E

Information
- Type: Independent, co-educational day school
- Motto: Rooted for Success
- Established: 2016
- Grades: Pre-Primary – Grade 12
- Language: English, Afrikaans
- Website: thorntreeacademy.co.za

Thorntree Academy is an independent, co-educational pre-primary, primary, and secondary school situated in Mokopane, Limpopo, South Africa.

Established in 2016, the institution operates three divisions: Sprouts Academy (Early Childhood Development), Thorntree Preparatory School (Grades R through 7), and Thorntree Senior College (Grades 8 through 12).

== History ==
Thorntree Preparatory School was founded in Mokopane in 2016 to provide independent primary education in the Waterberg District. Following growth in student enrollment, the school expanded its educational offerings to encompass early childhood education under the banner of Sprouts Academy, and subsequently established Thorntree Senior College to provide secondary education.

== Academic structure ==
Thorntree Academy operates across three educational tiers:

- Sprouts Academy: Early Childhood Development and pre-primary education (playgroup to Grade RR).
- Thorntree Preparatory School: Foundation and Intermediate/Senior primary phases (Grade R to Grade 7).
- Thorntree Senior College: Secondary education (Grade 8 to Grade 12), offering English and Afrikaans academic streams.

The school's pedagogical approach emphasizes a growth mindset under the institutional motto "Rooted for Success".

== Extracurricular and community involvement ==
- Academics and Science: Learners participate in regional and national academic competitions, including the Tritech Science Expo. In 2026, students from Thorntree were featured on the kykNET youth science television programme Ideemakers for experimental biochemistry projects.
- Literacy and Culture: The campus hosts community literacy initiatives and reading clubs, including the Kids Book Club Mokopane and annual joint literacy days featuring South African children's book authors.
- Community Outreach: The student body actively engages in charitable fundraisers, including animal welfare campaigns for the Mokopane SPCA and cancer awareness events for CANSA.
- Sport: Participation in local and provincial school sports, including swimming, athletics, and archery.
