= Thabazimbi Local Municipality =

Thabazimbi
- Local municipality
- Seal

- Location in Limpopo
- Coordinates: 24°35′S 27°10′E
- Country: South Africa
- Province: Limpopo
- District: Waterberg
- Seat: Thabazimbi
- Wards: 12

Government
  - Type: Municipal council
  - Mayor: Tokkie Swanepoel (DA)
  - Speaker: Butana Thlabadira

Area
  - Total: 11,190 km^{2} (4,320 sq mi)

Population (2022)
  - Total: 65,047
  - Density: 5.813/km^{2} (15.06/sq mi)

Racial makeup (2022)
  - Black African: 76.2%
  - Coloured: 0.5%
  - Indian/Asian: 0.4%
  - White: 22.8%

First languages (2011)
  - Tswana: 41.2%
  - Afrikaans: 15.7%
  - Xhosa: 12.3%
  - Northern Sotho: 8.0%
  - Other: 22.8%
- Time zone: UTC+2 (SAST)
- Municipal code: LIM361

Thabazimbi Municipality (Tswana: Mmasepala wa Thabazimbi; Afrikaans: Thabazimbi Munisipaliteit; Tsonga: Masipala was Thabazimbi) is a local municipality within the Waterberg District Municipality, in the Limpopo province of South Africa. The seat is Thabazimbi.

Thabazimbi is a Sotho–Nguni name meaning "iron ore mountain." The early Bantu communities (Sotho, Venda, Kalanga, Nguni and Nyasa) worked on this mountain to mine iron.

== Main places ==
The 2001 census divided the municipality into the following main places:

Place	Code	Area (km^{2})	Population	Most spoken language
Amandelbult	91401	47.73	2,076	Tswana
Ipeleng	91402	0.02	940	Tswana
Middeldrift	91403	1.15	2,138	Afrikaans
Mmebane	91404	0.01	283	Northern Sotho
Northam	91405	47.56	6,180	Tswana
Regorogile	91406	1.11	7,609	Tswana
Rooiberg Tin Mine	91407	4.32	250	Afrikaans
Rooikrans	91408	2.69	153	Tswana
Smersha Block	91409	1.33	12,875	Xhosa
Swartklip	91410	14.18	2,912	Afrikaans
Swartkop	91411	0.56	103	Afrikaans
Thabazimbi	91413	10.76	4,423	Afrikaans
Remainder of the municipality	91412	9,723.06	23,968	Tswana

== Politics ==
The municipal council consists of twenty-three members elected by mixed-member proportional representation. Twelve councillors are elected by first-past-the-post voting in twelve wards, while the remaining eleven are chosen from party lists so that the total number of party representatives is proportional to the number of votes received. In the election of 1 November 2021, the African National Congress (ANC) won a plurality of 11 seats.

The following table shows the results of the election.

Party	Ward			List			Total seats
Party	Votes	%	Seats	Votes	%	Seats	Total seats
African National Congress	8,845	47.34	11	8,827	47.46	0	11
Democratic Alliance	2,872	15.37	1	2,834	15.24	3	4
Thabazimbi Residents Association	2,031	10.87	0	2,077	11.17	3	3
Economic Freedom Fighters	1,929	10.32	0	1,940	10.43	2	2
Freedom Front Plus	1,724	9.23	0	1,641	8.82	2	2
Thabazimbi Forum for Service Delivery	604	3.23	0	665	3.58	1	1
Independent candidates	159	0.85	0				0
3 other parties	520	2.78	0	615	3.31	0	0
Total	18,684	100.00	12	18,599	100.00	11	23
Valid votes	18,684	98.61		18,599	98.62		
Invalid/blank votes	263	1.39		260	1.38		
Total votes	18,947	100.00		18,859	100.00		
Registered voters/turnout	45,688	41.47		45,688	41.28		

The municipality was dissolved due to dysfunctionality, and a full set of elections, ward and PR, were held to elect a new council in December 2024. The following table shows the results of the election.

Party	Ward			List			Total seats
Party	Votes	%	Seats	Votes	%	Seats	Total seats
African National Congress	7,766	39.21	10	7,943	40.09	0	10
Democratic Alliance	3,172	16.02	1	3,251	16.41	3	4
Economic Freedom Fighters	2,626	13.26	0	2,652	13.39	3	3
Labour Party	1,682	8.49	1	1,722	8.69	1	2
Freedom Front Plus	1,444	7.29	0	1,363	6.88	2	2
uMkhonto weSizwe	666	3.36	0	680	3.43	1	1
Thabazimbi Residents Association	316	1.60	0	447	2.26	1	1
Independent candidates	437	2.21	0				0
14 other parties	1,695	8.56	0	1,754	8.85	0	0
Total	19,804	100.00	12	19,812	100.00	11	23
Valid votes	19,804	98.53		19,812	98.47		
Invalid/blank votes	295	1.47		308	1.53		
Total votes	20,099	100.00		20,120	100.00		
Registered voters/turnout	51,399	39.10		51,399	39.14		
