= Mokopane English Combined School =

- MECS

Location
- 19 Kiepersol Street, Akasia; Mokopane, Limpopo, 0601; South Africa; 24.1770°S 28.9986°E

Information
- Type: Independent, non-profit combined day school
- Motto: Rooted in care, growing with purpose
- Established: 2001
- Founder: Dr. Suliman Tayob, Ahmed Cachalia, Ashraf Bhyat, Aboo Bakr Tayob
- Headmaster: Brian Dawson
- Grades: Grade RR – Grade 12
- Language: English
- Affiliation: ISASA
- Website: mecschool.co.za

Mokopane English Combined School (commonly abbreviated as MECS) is an independent, co-educational combined primary and high school situated in Mokopane (formerly Potgietersrus), Limpopo, South Africa.

The school provides education from Early Childhood Development (Grade RR) through to Grade 12 (Matric). MECS is a member of the Independent Schools Association of Southern Africa (ISASA) and its high school matriculants sit for the Independent Examinations Board (IEB) examinations.

== History ==
The school was established in 2001 in the Akasia suburb of Mokopane by members of the local community, including Dr. Suliman Tayob, Ahmed Cachalia, Ashraf Bhyat, and the late Aboo Bakr Tayob. Initially founded as the Potgietersrus Muslim School under the leadership of Yunus Hassen, the institution evolved into an inclusive, independent combined English-medium school serving learners of diverse cultural and religious backgrounds across the Waterberg District.

In November 2015, the school expanded its campus infrastructure with the addition of dedicated modern classrooms for its Foundation Phase (Grade R to Grade 3).

== Academics ==
Mokopane English Combined School operates four internal academic divisions:

- Early Childhood Development (ECD) – Grade RR & Grade R
- Foundation Phase – Grade 1 to Grade 3
- Intermediate & Senior Primary Phase – Grade 4 to Grade 7
- High School – Grade 8 to Grade 12

The school is affiliated with the Independent Schools Association of Southern Africa (ISASA). The secondary school follows the curriculum aligned with the Independent Examinations Board (IEB), writing the National Senior Certificate examinations.

== Extracurricular activities ==
The school participates in academic, cultural, and sporting leagues within the Limpopo region.

- Culture & Academics: Debate, public speaking, poetry competitions (such as the Rotary Debate Competition and MDA English Poetry), spelling bees, and science expos.
- Sports: Football (soccer), netball, volleyball, archery, athletics, and chess.

== Leadership ==
The school is governed by a board of governors and administered by an executive management team. Educationalist Brian Dawson, former headmaster of Stanford Lake College and former executive director of the global Round Square schools network, serves as the school's principal.
