= Onverwacht, Limpopo =

Onverwacht
- Location within Limpopo Location within South Africa
- Coordinates: 23.685°S 27.696°E
- Country: South Africa
- Province: Limpopo
- District: Waterberg
- Municipality: Lephalale
- Main Place: Lephalale

Area
  - Total: 10.11 km^{2} (3.90 sq mi)

Population (2011)
  - Total: 9,502
  - Density: 939.9/km^{2} (2,434/sq mi)

Racial makeup (2011)
  - Black African: 54.6%
  - Coloured: 3.7%
  - Indian/Asian: 1.0%
  - White: 40.3%
  - Other: 0.4%

First languages (2011)
  - Afrikaans: 43.9%
  - Northern Sotho: 19.6%
  - English: 11.6%
  - Tswana: 7.3%
  - Other: 17.6%
- Time zone: UTC+2 (SAST)
- Postal code (street): 0557
- PO box: 0557

Onverwacht is a suburb of Lephalale in Waterberg District Municipality in the Limpopo province of South Africa.
