= Ephraim Makgoba =

South African judge (born 1953)

Judge President of the Limpopo High Court
- In office 1 August 2015 – December 2022
- Appointed by: Jacob Zuma
- Deputy: Fikile Mokgohloa; Violet Semenya
- Preceded by: Division established
- Succeeded by: George Phatudi

Judge of the High Court
- In office 28 January 2008 – 31 July 2015
- Appointed by: Thabo Mbeki
- Division: Gauteng

Personal details
- Born: Ephraim Mampuru Makgoba; 1 January 1953 (age 73) Ga-Mathabatha, Transvaal; Union of South Africa
- Education: University of the North

Ephraim Mampuru Makgoba (born 1 January 1953) is a South African retired judge of the High Court of South Africa. He was the inaugural Judge President of the Limpopo Division from 2015 to 2022, though he joined the bench in 2008 as a puisne judge of the Gauteng Division. Before he joined the bench, he was an attorney in Nelspruit and Polokwane.

== Early life and education ==
Makgoba was born on 1 January 1953 at Ga-Mathabatha village, southeast of Polokwane in the former Northern Transvaal. He was one of eight siblings. He matriculated at Ngwana-Mohube High School and studied law at the University of the North, completing a BProc in 1977.

== Legal career ==
After he was admitted as an attorney in February 1980, Makgoba worked at the firm of Henstock and Green while also lecturing in criminal law part-time at his alma mater. He moved to Nelspruit for a stint but returned to Polokwane in 1984 and practised there for the next two decades, first on his own account and then at the firm of Makgoba, Kgomo and Makgeleng Attorneys from 1993. He was also an acting judge in the High Court of South Africa on several occasions between 2000 and 2007.

== Gauteng High Court: 2008–2015 ==
On 19 November 2007, President Thabo Mbeki announced that Makgoba would join the bench permanently as a judge of the Transvaal Provincial Division (later the North Gauteng Division) of the High Court. He joined the bench on 28 January 2008, alongside Piet Meyer and two other new appointees. Thereafter he served in the Gauteng High Court for seven-and-a-half years, and he was an acting judge in the Competition Appeal Court in 2015.

== Limpopo High Court: 2015–2022 ==
In March 2015, the Judicial Service Commission announced that Makgoba had been shortlisted for the position of Judge President of the High Court's new Limpopo Division, which would take over the circuit in Limpopo Province (formerly served by the Gauteng Division). He was interviewed in Cape Town the following month alongside six other candidates, and the Mail & Guardian said that he "sailed through" the interview. The Judicial Service Commission recommended him for appointment, and President Jacob Zuma confirmed his appointment in June.

His appointment took effect on 1 August 2015, though it was not until January 2016 that the Limpopo Division was formally launched, with a seat at Polokwane. During his tenure in the judge presidency, he was the subject of several minor scandals, including multiple complaints against him at the Judicial Service Commission.

He retired in late 2022, with a farewell function in December attended by Limpopo Premier Stan Mathabatha.

== Personal ==
Makgoba is married to Dorah Ramadimetja, with whom he has three children. He is Christian.
