= Fikile Mokgohloa =

South African judge (1961–2026)

The Honourable Fikile Mokgohloa

Judge of the Supreme Court of Appeal
- In office 1 June 2019 – 20 August 2026
- Appointed by: Cyril Ramaphosa

Deputy Judge President of the Limpopo High Court
- In office 1 July 2016 – 31 May 2019
- Appointed by: Jacob Zuma
- President: Ephraim Makgoba

Judge of the High Court
- In office 25 January 2016 – 31 May 2019
- Appointed by: Jacob Zuma
- Division: Limpopo
- In office 17 November 2008 – 24 January 2016
- Appointed by: Kgalema Motlanthe
- Division: KwaZulu-Natal

Personal details
- Born: 1 June 1961 Pretoria, Transvaal, South Africa
- Died: 20 August 2026 (aged 65)
- Education: University of the North West

Fikile Eunice Mokgohloa (1 June 1961 – 20 August 2026) was a South African judge of the Supreme Court of Appeal. Before her elevation to that court in June 2019, she was a judge of the High Court of South Africa between November 2008 and May 2019. She joined the bench as a judge of the KwaZulu-Natal Division and moved to the Limpopo Division in January 2016, becoming Deputy Judge President in Limpopo in July 2016. Born in Pretoria, she began her career as an attorney in the former Transvaal.

== Early life and education ==
Mokgohloa was born on 1 June 1961 in Pretoria in the former Transvaal. She grew up in rural Winterveld. After matriculating, she attended the University of the North West, where she completed a BJuris in 1987 and an LLB in 1990.

== Legal practice ==
Mokgohloa served her articles of clerkship at Tshegofatso Monama Attorneys between 1990 and 1993. Thereafter she joined Hack, Stupel & Ross Attorneys in Pretoria as an attorney, becoming a partner in 1996. She left that firm to become a partner at her own firm, Mokgohloa Attorneys, in January 2000.

Between July 2001 and February 2006, Mokgohloa served two years as acting regional magistrate at the Bafokeng Magistrate's Court in Rustenburg, as well as stints as a district magistrate at Brits and Odi. Thereafter she was an acting judge of the High Court of South Africa: first in the Northern Cape Division for two years between June 2006 and June 2008, and then in the KwaZulu-Natal Division between July 2008 and November 2008.

== KwaZulu-Natal High Court: 2008–2016 ==
On 17 November 2008, Mokgohloa joined the bench permanently when she was appointed a judge in the KwaZulu-Natal High Court. Significant matters heard by Mokgohloa in KwaZulu-Natal included T. M. v Z. J., which concerned the recognition of Islamic marriages and divorces not registered in terms of the Marriage Act. In a judgement handed down in the Durban High Court in September 2015, Mokgohloa ruled that spouses in such marriages could not precluded from obtaining the relief provided by the Marriage Act, including spousal maintenance. Also in 2015, she heard Abahlali baseMjondolo's high-profile challenge to the eviction of shack-dwellers who had invaded unused land in eThekwini.

In March 2012, Mokgohloa was one of two candidates shortlisted by the Judicial Service Commission for possible appointment to succeed Chiman Patel as Deputy Judge President of the KwaZulu-Natal High Court. The contest was fierce: Mokgohloa was a popular candidate among lawyers and judges in the province, especially those who favoured gender transformation, while her opponent, Isaac Madondo, was viewed as having the backing of the province's political establishment. Mokgohloa's nomination was supported by 14 members of the bench, while Madondo was supported by only three, but commentators believed that the Judicial Service Commission was troubled by this public judicial lobbying; after interviews were held in April, the commission announced that it would not recommend either Mokgohloa or Madondo for appointment but would instead re-advertise the vacancy. The Commission said that its members had deadlocked during voting, with each candidate receiving 12 votes from commissioners.

== Limpopo High Court: 2016–2019 ==
On 25 January 2016, Mokgohloa moved to the bench of the Limpopo High Court, which had just opened its new seat at Polokwane. Soon afterwards, in April 2016, she was shortlisted and interviewed for appointment as Deputy Judge President of the Limpopo Division. The other two candidates were judges Frans Kgomo and Legodi Phatudi, and the Judicial Service Commission recommended Mokgohloa for the position. Her appointment was confirmed by President Jacob Zuma with effect from 1 July 2016.

During her two-and-a-half years in Limpopo, Mokgohloa was seconded to the Supreme Court of Appeal as an acting judge for two half-year periods, first between June and November 2017 and then between June and November 2018, and for an additional term between December 2018 and March 2019.

== Supreme Court of Appeal: 2019–2026 ==
In April 2019, Mokgohloa was one of nine candidates interviewed for permanent appointment to five vacancies at the Supreme Court of Appeal. Her nomination was supported by the KwaZulu-Natal branch of Advocates for Transformation, but the National Association of Democratic Lawyers suggested that she required more time at the High Court to prepare for elevation. In her brief, 25-minute interview, Mokgohloa described herself as "prone to judicial activism" and was complimented as "sensible, diligent and studious" by Supreme Court President Mandisa Maya, who said that she had struggled to secure Mokgohloa for acting stints at the Supreme Court because she was so indispensable to the Limpopo Division. Amid concerns about a gender imbalance in the Supreme Court, the Judicial Service Commission recommended all three female candidates for appointment – Mokgohloa, Yvonne Mbatha, and Caroline Nicholls – alongside two men. President Cyril Ramaphosa confirmed their appointment in June 2019.

== Personal life and death ==
Mokgohloa had one son and a grandchild. She died on 20 August 2026, at the age of 65.
