= Mapela, South Africa =

Mapela
- Location within Limpopo Location within South Africa
- Coordinates: 24.021°S 28.853°E
- Country: South Africa
- Province: Limpopo
- District: Waterberg
- Municipality: Mogalakwena

Area
  - Total: 4.62 km^{2} (1.78 sq mi)

Population (2011)
  - Total: 3,549
  - Density: 768/km^{2} (1,990/sq mi)

Racial makeup (2011)
  - Black African: 99.8%
  - Indian/Asian: 0.1%
  - Other: 0.1%

First languages (2011)
  - Northern Sotho: 95.3%
  - Tsonga: 1.4%
  - Other: 3.4%
- Time zone: UTC+2 (SAST)
- Postal code (street): 0610
- PO box: 0610

Mapela is a large village located northwest of the town of Mokopane in the Waterberg district of the Limpopo province in South Africa.
