= Gojela High School =

Secondary school in Limpopo, South Africa

Coordinates: 24.1414°S 28.9796°E

Information
- School type: High school
- Grades: 8-12
- Enrollment: c.800-900

Gojela High School is a high school in Mahwelereng, Limpopo province, South Africa. The high school caters for learners from Grade 8 to Grade 12. It was historically known for a strong Home Economics Department, having had home economics equipment that was not rivaled in Mahwelereng.

The first principal of the school was Mr. Lucas B. Mokonyama (Author of Sepedi Book "Makoko a Mammati"). It has since had many more leaders.

The school was also at the centre of political revolution in South Africa, particularly in the late 1980s.

Currently, the school caters for between 800 and 900 learners.

In 2015, 85 students passed Grade 12; 7.3% obtaining bachelor, 46.3% diploma and 46.3% certificate entry qualifications respectively
