= Roedtan =

- Location within Limpopo Location within South Africa
- Coordinates: 24°35′54″S 29°04′50″E
- Country: South Africa
- Province: Limpopo
- District: Waterberg
- Municipality: Modimolle–Mookgophong

Area
  - Total: 1.00 km^{2} (0.39 sq mi)

Population (2011)
  - Total: 98
  - Density: 98/km^{2} (250/sq mi)

Racial makeup (2011)
  - Black African: 83.7%
  - White: 16.3%

First languages (2011)
  - Northern Sotho: 41.7%
  - Tsonga: 20.8%
  - English: 13.5%
  - Afrikaans: 11.5%
  - Other: 12.5%
- Time zone: UTC+2 (SAST)
- PO box: 0580
- Area code: 015

Roedtan is a small town in the Limpopo province, South Africa, set in the midst of the Springbok Flats. Roedtan has a railroad station 85 km (53 mi) from Polokwane.

The cave Makapansgat is now known to record early hominid occupation (1,500,000 years ago) and is a national monument. The Springbok Flats is a reminder that great herds of Springbok once populated the plain, which was also frequented by lions and other wild animals.
