= Lephalale Local Municipality =

Coordinates: 23°30′S 27°55′E

Lephalale
- Local municipality
- Seal

- Location in Limpopo
- Country: South Africa
- Province: Limpopo
- District: Waterberg
- Seat: Lephalale
- Wards: 15

Government
  - Type: Municipal council
  - Mayor: Cllr Alpheus Thulare (African National Congress)

Area
  - Total: 13,784 km^{2} (5,322 sq mi)

Population (2011)
  - Total: 115,767
  - Density: 8.3987/km^{2} (21.752/sq mi)

Racial makeup (2011)
  - Black African: 90.7%
  - Coloured: 0.9%
  - Indian/Asian: 0.3%
  - White: 7.9%

First languages (2011)
  - Northern Sotho: 51.7%
  - Tswana: 24.1%
  - Afrikaans: 8.1%
  - English: 3.1%
  - Other: 13%
- Time zone: UTC+2 (SAST)
- Municipal code: LIM362

Lephalale Municipality (Northern Sotho: Mmasepala wa Lephalale; Tswana: Mmasepala wa Lephalale) is a local municipality within the Waterberg District Municipality, in the Limpopo province of South Africa. The seat is Lephalale.

== Politics ==
In the 2004 South African general election, the ANC won with an overwhelming majority of 88% (with 27,299 votes), while the Democratic Alliance (DA) and Freedom Front Plus (FF+, Afrikaans: VF+) only received 7% and 2% respectively.

In the 2009 South African general election, the ANC's support fell to 82.0% (24,451 votes), while the DA increased their vote percentage to 8.5% (2,521 votes) and COPE, a newly formed party, gained 5.7% (1,697 votes) of the vote. The Freedom Front Plus, the now 4th largest part, lost some support to 1.61% (480 votes), albeit only 17 fewer votes.

In the most recent 2014 South African general election, the ANC once again won overwhelmingly but again lost support, this time earning 73.8%. Much of its losses went to the new Economic Freedom Fighters which gained 10.9% and a third place. DA remained in second position and increased their support to 11.3%. COPE lost almost all its support and gained only 0.7%.

=== Local elections ===
The municipal council consists of twenty-nine members elected by mixed-member proportional representation. Fifteen councillors are elected by first-past-the-post voting in fifteen wards, while the remaining fourteen are chosen from party lists so that the total number of party representatives is proportional to the number of votes received. In the election of 3 August 2016 the African National Congress (ANC) won a majority of seventeen seats on the council. The following table shows the results of the election.

Party	Votes				Seats		
Party	Ward	List	Total	%	Ward	List	Total
ANC	18,389	18,267	36,656	64.6	10	7	17
EFF	5,522	5,654	11,176	19.7	0	5	5
DA	3,801	3,781	7,582	13.4	3	1	4
VF+	432	418	850	1.5	0	0	0
COPE	172	197	369	0.7	0	0	0
PAC	61	64	125	0.2	0	0	0
International Revelation Congress	3	23	26	0.0	0	0	0
Total	28,380	28,404	56,784	100.0	13	13	26
Spoilt votes	523	451	974				

== Main places ==
The 2001 census divided the municipality into the following main places:

Place	Code	Area (km^{2})	Population	Most spoken language
Bakenberg	91501	260.83	13,603	Northern Sotho
Ellisras (renamed Lephalale in 2002)	91502	3.22	1,572	Afrikaans
Kwarriehoek	91503	1.76	0	-
Marapong	91505	3.21	5,636	Northern Sotho
Onverwacht	91506	8.10	7,862	Afrikaans
Potgietersrus	91507	23.85	69	Northern Sotho
Seleka	91508	335.67	21,868	Tswana
Shongoane	91509	67.92	13,172	Northern Sotho
St Catherina	91510	1.79	939	Northern Sotho
Remainder of the municipality	91504	18,898.84	31,392	Northern Sotho
