= Limpopo High Court =

Court in Limpopo, South Africa

Limpopo Division of the High Court of South Africa
- Interactive map of Limpopo Division of the High Court of South Africa
- 23.9124°S 29.4538°E
- Jurisdiction: Limpopo, South Africa
- Location: Polokwane (main seat), Thohoyandou, Lephalale (local seats)
- Coordinates: 23.9124°S 29.4538°E
- Composition method: Presidential appointment on the advice of the Judicial Service Commission
- Authorised by: Chp. 8 of the Constitution; Superior Courts Act, 2013
- Appeals to: Supreme Court of Appeal or Constitutional Court
- Number of positions: 9

Judge President
- Currently: George Phatudi
- Since: 1 December 2023

Deputy Judge President
- Currently: Violet Semenya
- Since: 1 July 2021

The Limpopo High Court (in full the Limpopo Division of the High Court of South Africa) is a superior court of law with general jurisdiction over the Limpopo province of South Africa. The main seat of the court in Polokwane opened on 25 January 2016. The court also has a local seat at Thohoyandou with jurisdiction over the northern part of the province. Before the opening of the division, the Gauteng High Court at Pretoria had jurisdiction over Limpopo and circuit courts sat at Polokwane. The court consists of nine permanent judges, with six (including the judge president and deputy judge president) at Polokwane, and three at Thohoyandou.

== History ==
Until 1994, the area that is now Limpopo was part of the Transvaal Province and was within the jurisdiction of the Transvaal Provincial Division (now the Gauteng Division). In July 1979 a High Court was established for the Venda bantustan. In September of the same year Venda became nominally independent from South Africa, and its court became the Supreme Court of Venda, although decisions of the court could still be appealed to the Appellate Division of the Supreme Court of South Africa.

When Venda was reincorporated into South Africa in 1994 the court continued to exist, and when the current Constitution of South Africa came into force it became one of the High Courts. It was known as the Venda Division until 2009, when it received the name of "Limpopo High Court, Thohoyandou". In 2013, in the restructuring brought about by the Superior Courts Act, the court at Thohoyandou became a local seat of the Limpopo Division, with the main seat to be established at Polokwane.

The main seat of the court at Polokwane was established in 2016, along with an additional local seat at Lephalale. A 2023 committee report found that the Lephalale local seat was not operational, and recommended its closure. This change took effect in 2026.

== Seats ==
Map of the areas of jurisdiction of the seats of the division

City	Coordinates	Jurisdiction	Former names
Polokwane (main seat)	23.9132°S 29.4577°E	Exclusive jurisdiction over Capricorn District Municipality, Waterberg District Municipality, Sekhukhune District Municipality, and Mopani District Municipality excluding Greater Giyani Local Municipality; Concurrent appeal jurisdiction over the whole Limpopo province	
Thohoyandou	22.9679°S 30.4574°E	Vhembe District Municipality and Greater Giyani Local Municipality	High Court of Venda; Supreme Court of Venda; Venda Division; Limpopo High Court, Thohoyandou

== List of Judges President ==
- Ephraim Makgoba (2015–2022)
- George Phatudi (2023–present)
