= Pienaarsrivier =

- Location within Limpopo Location within South Africa
- Coordinates: 25.213°S 28.300°E
- Country: South Africa
- Province: Limpopo
- District: Waterberg
- Municipality: Bela-Bela

Area
  - Total: 2.06 km^{2} (0.80 sq mi)

Population (2011)
  - Total: 1,897
  - Density: 921/km^{2} (2,390/sq mi)

Racial makeup (2011)
  - Black African: 98.2%
  - Coloured: 0.3%
  - Indian/Asian: 0.2%
  - White: 1.3%
  - Other: 0.1%

First languages (2011)
  - Northern Sotho: 37.2%
  - Tswana: 35.8%
  - Tsonga: 8.4%
  - Sotho: 5.2%
  - Other: 13.4%
- Time zone: UTC+2 (SAST)
- PO box: 0420
- Area code: 012

Pienaarsrivier is a town some 70 km (43 mi) due north of Pretoria, north of the Pienaars River. The river is named after Petrus Gerhardus Jacobus Pienaar, born 26 February 1819 in George, Cape Colony, who trekked to the then Transvaal in 1858. He became a local pioneer farmer, and reputedly shot an elephant whilst hunting in the area. The Setswana name of this river is Moretele, from which the Moreletaspruit derives its name. The town Pienaarsrivier was established in 1908. Pienaarsrivier is located within Bela Bela Local Municipality and serves as a Trans Provincial Region that connects Limpopo, Mpumalanga and Gauteng.
