= Thabazimbi =

Iron mining town in the Limpopo province of South Africa

- Town
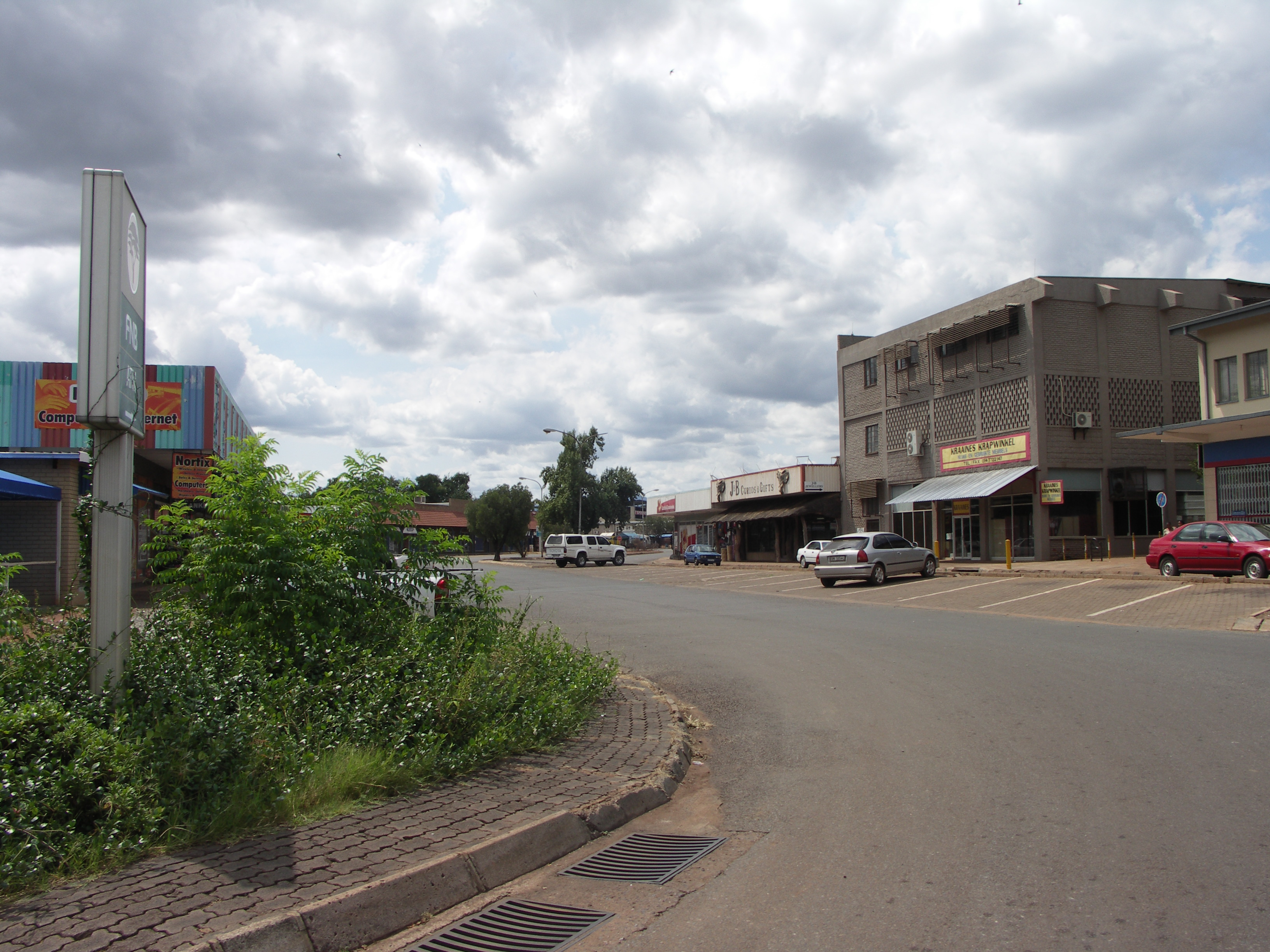
- Central Business Area in Thabazimbi

- Location within Limpopo Location within South Africa Location within Africa
- Coordinates: 24°36′S 27°24′E
- Country: South Africa
- Province: Limpopo
- District: Waterberg
- Municipality: Thabazimbi

Area
  - Total: 160.89 km^{2} (62.12 sq mi)

Population (2011)
  - Total: 28,847
  - Density: 179.30/km^{2} (464.38/sq mi)

Racial makeup (2011)
  - Black African: 82.3%
  - Coloured: 0.4%
  - Indian/Asian: 0.2%
  - White: 16.9%
  - Other: 0.3%

First languages (2011)
  - Tswana: 53.8%
  - Afrikaans: 17.2%
  - Northern Sotho: 9.9%
  - English: 3.8%
  - Other: 15.3%
- Time zone: UTC+2 (SAST)
- Postal code (street): 0387
- PO box: 0380
- Area code: 014

Thabazimbi was an iron mining town in the Limpopo province of South Africa. The town is at the feet of the Ysterberg and is surrounded by the Witfonteinrand and Boshofberg with the Kransberg in the background. The name Thabazimbi means mountain of iron because of the large iron ore reef that was discovered in 1919 by J. H. Williams. Up until the mine closure in 2015, due to a 65 million ton rock fall,two million tonnes of ore was once hauled by train to Mittal's iron and steel works. The railway line from Rustenburg reached the area in the 1930s and full scale iron and steel production began. The town was proclaimed in 1953. Kumba Iron Ore, previously Kumba Resources, is now the principal operator of the iron ore mine.

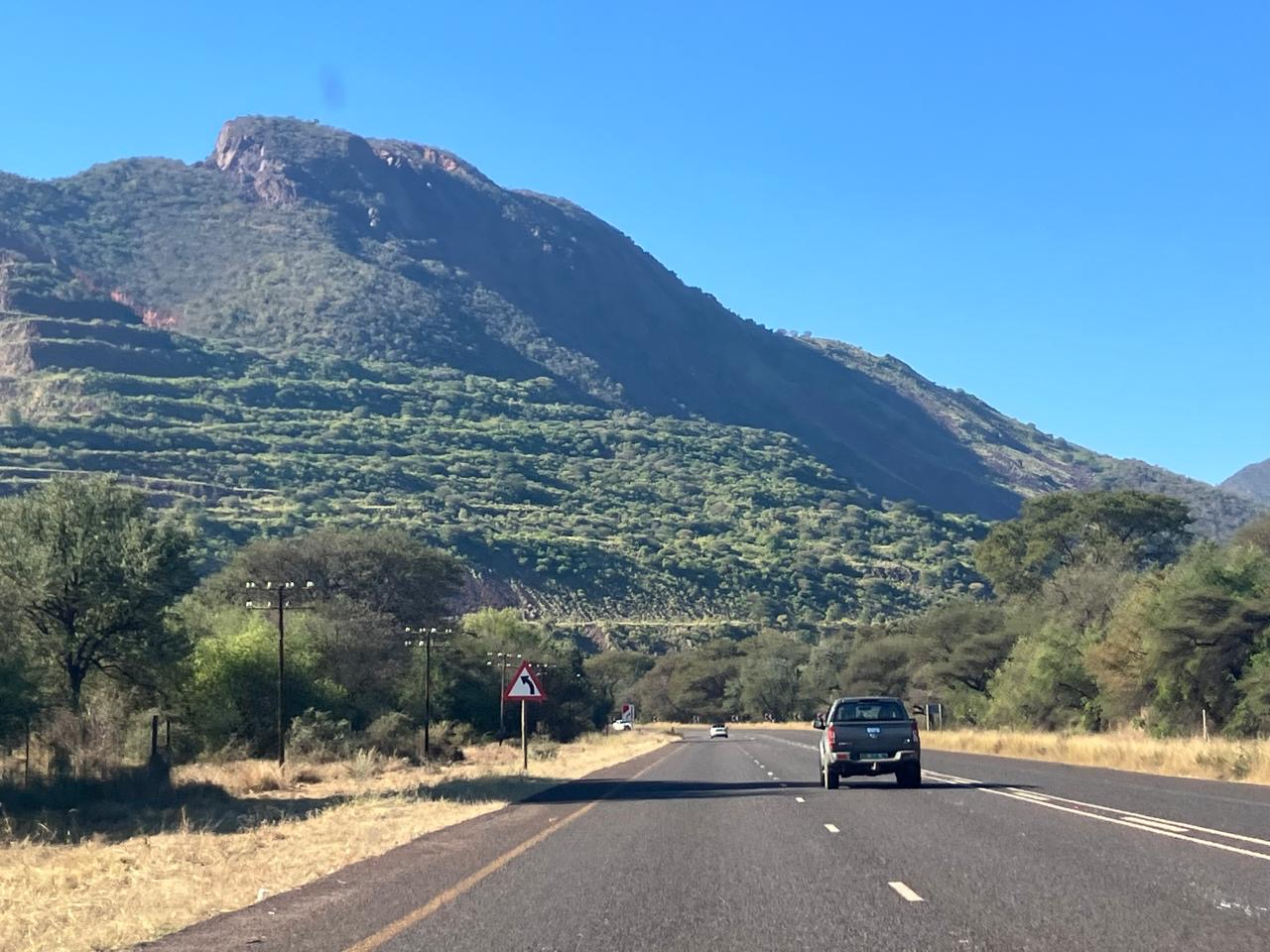
The iron ore mining slopes in Thabazimbi, are now overgrown.

The Marakele National Park about 20 km north-east of the town and in the heart of Waterberg Mountains is characterised by contrasting mountain landscapes, hills and valleys, as well a variety of wildlife. Marakele National Park is also the home of some of the Tuli elephants that were caught up in controversy in 1999 involving animal cruelty in South Africa.

In the post-apartheid era, the town made headlines in 2003 as the site of Kamp Staaldraad, the Springboks' infamous training camp prior to the Rugby World Cup. The excesses of Kamp Staaldraad helped lead to an almost complete housecleaning of the upper administrative levels of South African rugby union.
