= Bela-Bela =

Bela-Bela Warmbaths
- Coat of arms
- Motto: Salus et vita
- Location within Limpopo Location within South Africa Location within Africa
- Coordinates: 24°53′S 28°17′E
- Country: South Africa
- Province: Limpopo
- District: Waterberg
- Municipality: Bela-Bela
- Established: 1873

Area
  - Total: 23.29 km^{2} (8.99 sq mi)

Population (2011)
  - Total: 45,001
  - Density: 1,932/km^{2} (5,004/sq mi)

Racial makeup (2011)
  - Black African: 89.1%
  - Coloured: 1.7%
  - Indian/Asian: 0.7%
  - White: 8.2%
  - Other: 0.3%

First languages (2011)
  - Northern Sotho: 43.0%
  - Tswana: 18.1%
  - Tsonga: 12.4%
  - Afrikaans: 9.4%
  - Other: 17.1%
- Time zone: UTC+2 (SAST)
- Postal code (street): 0480
- Area code: 014

Bela-Bela (Tswana for 'the pot that boils'; formerly known as Warmbaths, Afrikaans: Warmbad) is a town in the Limpopo Province of South Africa. Deriving its name from the geothermic hot springs around which the town was built.

The town is situated in the Waterberg District of the Limpopo Province. It lies off the N1 road between Pretoria and Polokwane (Pietersburg). Its hot springs produce 22,000 litres per hour at 52 °C (126 °F).

The main hot springs holiday resort (previously run by state-owned company Aventura, formerly called Overvaal) in the town is still branded Warmbaths.

== History ==
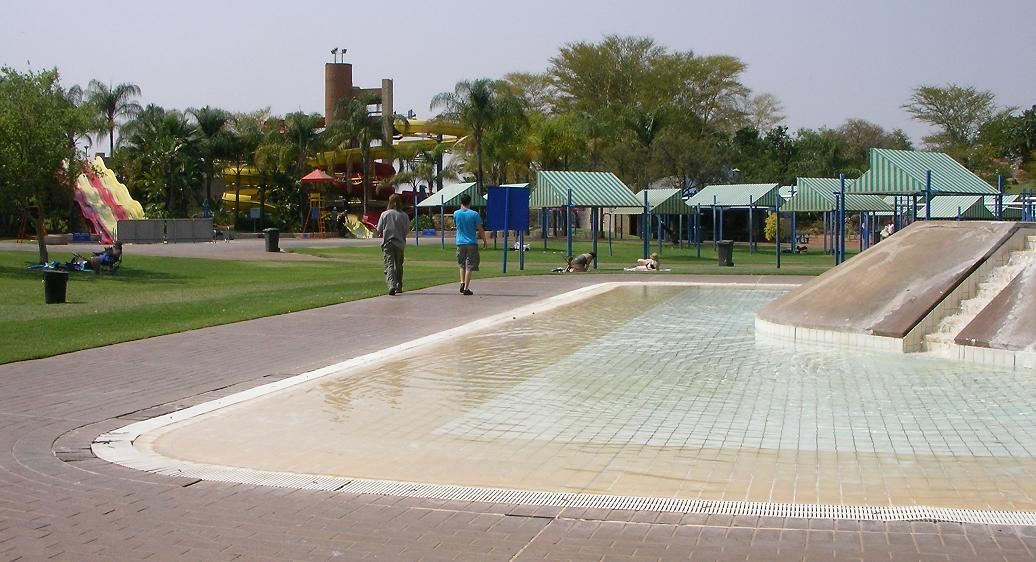
Slides and pools in the hot springs resort

When the Tswana tribes first moved into the region in the 1800s, they discovered hot springs in the area.

The Voortrekker Carl Van Heerden established the first Boer farm in what is now Bela-Bela and called it Het Bad. In 1873, President Burgers' Transvaal government bought the land and established a resort called Hartingsburg after the prominent Dutch biologist Pieter Harting. The British occupied the town during the Anglo-Boer War, and renamed the post office Warm Baths in 1903, and proclaimed the boundaries of Warmbaths to be the entire farm of Het Bad.

In 1920 Warmbaths was proclaimed a township (in the legal, not racial sense) and the township was designed by architect John Abraham Moffat in that year. In 1950, it became a magisterial district. In 1932 Warmbaths became a village town and was established as a town council in 1960.

Called Warmbaths in English, the Afrikaans name for the town was Warmbad.

On 14 June 2002 the South African government officially renamed the town Bela-Bela (meaning "boiling boiling").

== Climate ==
Climate data for Bela-Bela (1961–1990)
Month	Jan	Feb	Mar	Apr	May	Jun	Jul	Aug	Sep	Oct	Nov	Dec	Year
Record high °C (°F)	40 (104)	37 (99)	37 (99)	34 (93)	32 (90)	28 (82)	28 (82)	33 (91)	37 (99)	38 (100)	38 (100)	39 (102)	40 (104)
Mean daily maximum °C (°F)	30 (86)	29 (84)	28 (82)	26 (79)	24 (75)	21 (70)	21 (70)	24 (75)	28 (82)	29 (84)	29 (84)	30 (86)	27 (81)
Mean daily minimum °C (°F)	17 (63)	17 (63)	15 (59)	12 (54)	7 (45)	3 (37)	3 (37)	6 (43)	10 (50)	14 (57)	15 (59)	16 (61)	11 (52)
Record low °C (°F)	9 (48)	10 (50)	3 (37)	2 (36)	−2 (28)	−8 (18)	−6 (21)	−6 (21)	−3 (27)	3 (37)	6 (43)	7 (45)	−8 (18)
Average precipitation mm (inches)	120 (4.7)	84 (3.3)	74 (2.9)	37 (1.5)	7 (0.3)	6 (0.2)	2 (0.1)	5 (0.2)	16 (0.6)	58 (2.3)	101 (4.0)	124 (4.9)	634 (25.0)
Average precipitation days (≥ 1.0 mm)	12	9	9	6	2	1	1	1	2	8	11	13	74
Source: South African Weather Service

== Notable people ==
AB de Villiers

Edna Molewa

== See also ==
- List of reduplicated place names
