= Mookgophong =

Mookgophong Naboomspruit
- Location within Limpopo Location within South Africa
- Coordinates: 24°31′S 28°43′E
- Country: South Africa
- Province: Limpopo
- District: Waterberg
- Municipality: Modimolle–Mookgophong
- Established: 1907
  - Councillor: (ANC)

Area
  - Total: 27.18 km^{2} (10.49 sq mi)

Population (2011)
  - Total: 24,853
  - Density: 914.4/km^{2} (2,368/sq mi)

Racial makeup (2011)
  - Black African: 88.1%
  - Coloured: 0.4%
  - Indian/Asian: 0.2%
  - White: 10.9%
  - Other: 0.5%

First languages (2011)
  - Northern Sotho: 56.3%
  - Tsonga: 13.7%
  - Afrikaans: 10.9%
  - Sotho: 6.1%
  - Other: 12.9%
- Time zone: UTC+2 (SAST)
- Postal code (street): 0560
- PO box: 0560
- Area code: 014

Mookgophong, formerly known as Naboomspruit, is a town in the Limpopo province of South Africa. The town is located approximately 42 km north-east of Modimolle and 51 km south-west of Mokopane.

== History ==
It was founded on the farm Vischgat in 1907 and administered by a health committee from 1919. The name Naboomspruit is Afrikaans but derived from Khoekhoen; ‘euphorbia tree stream’, after the Euphorbia ingens which grows there. The town was officially renamed Mookgophong on the 24 November 2006, by the South African government.
