= Mogalakwena Local Municipality =

Coordinates: 23°50′S 28°40′E

Mogalakwena
- Local municipality
- Seal

- Location in Limpopo
- Country: South Africa
- Province: Limpopo
- District: Waterberg
- Seat: Mokopane
- Wards: 32

Government
  - Type: Municipal council
  - Mayor: Andrina Matsemela

Area
  - Total: 6,166 km^{2} (2,381 sq mi)

Population (2011)
  - Total: 307,682
  - Density: 49.90/km^{2} (129.2/sq mi)

Racial makeup (2011)
  - Black African: 96.1%
  - Coloured: 0.1%
  - Indian/Asian: 0.5%
  - White: 3.0%

First languages (2011)
  - Northern Sotho: 73.5%
  - Tsonga: 9.1%
  - Southern Ndebele: 6.6%
  - Afrikaans: 3.1%
  - Other: 7.7%
- Time zone: UTC+2 (SAST)
- Municipal code: LIM367

Mogalakwena Municipality (Northern Sotho: Mmasepala wa Mogalakwena) is a local municipality within the Waterberg District Municipality, in the Limpopo province of South Africa. It's named after the mogalakwena river which comes from the babina Kwena fierce Nile crocodile. The seat is Mokopane. The area constitute of a cosmopolitan of different chiefdoms: mainly Bakone (Masenya le Matlala), Lebelo kgomo, Transvaal Ndebele Langa & Kekana, phokela, Lekalekale, babirwa.

== Main places ==
The 2001 census divided the municipality into the following main places:

Place	Code	Area (km^{2})	Population	Most spoken language
Babirwa	91901	5.17	3,328	Northern Sotho
Bakenberg Langa	91902	1,223.97	101,580	Northern Sotho
Bakoni Manetji	91903	581.60	27,375	Northern Sotho
Ba-Mokopane	91904	130.49	44,026	Northern Sotho
Batlokwa	91905	96.64	8,190	Northern Sotho
Lekalakala Part 1	91906	9.24	20,394	Northern Sotho
Lekalakala Part 2	91917	2.50	1,305	Northern Sotho
Mahwelereng	91907	10.12	32,819	Northern Sotho
Matlala Dichoeneng	91909	2.34	3,265	Northern Sotho
Matlala	91908	2.48	535	Northern Sotho
Mokerong	91911	23.93	45	Northern Sotho
Nkiditlana	91912	1.30	1,202	Northern Sotho
Potgietersrus(Ga Mokopane)	91913	65.97	19,391	Afrikaans
Rebone	91914	2.60	2,579	Northern Sotho
Sekgakgapeng	91915	4.00	12,113	Northern Sotho
Tsebishi	91916	0.92	1,838	Northern Sotho
Remainder of the municipality	91910	4,021.12	18,464	Northern Sotho

== Politics ==
The municipal council consists of sixty-four members elected by mixed-member proportional representation. Thirty-two councillors are elected by first-past-the-post voting in thirty-two wards, while the remaining thirty-two are chosen from party lists so that the total number of party representatives is proportional to the number of votes received. In the election of 1 November 2021 the African National Congress (ANC) won a majority of forty-two seats on the council.

The following table shows the results of the election.

Party	Ward			List			Total seats
Party	Votes	%	Seats	Votes	%	Seats	Total seats
African National Congress	36,107	63.58	29	37,142	65.13	13	42
Economic Freedom Fighters	10,892	19.18	1	11,135	19.52	12	13
Democratic Alliance	4,237	7.46	2	4,192	7.35	3	5
Freedom Front Plus	1,269	2.23	0	1,284	2.25	2	2
Pan Africanist Congress of Azania	701	1.23	0	651	1.14	1	1
Independent candidates	1,341	2.36	0				0
African People's Convention	526	0.93	0	423	0.74	1	1
7 other parties	1,718	3.03	0	2,204	3.86	0	0
Total	56,791	100.00	32	57,031	100.00	32	64
Valid votes	56,791	98.29		57,031	98.30		
Invalid/blank votes	990	1.71		985	1.70		
Total votes	57,781	100.00		58,016	100.00		
Registered voters/turnout	141,932	40.71		141,932	40.88		

== See also ==
- Mogalakwena River
