= Mokopane =

Mokopane Potgietersrus
- Town
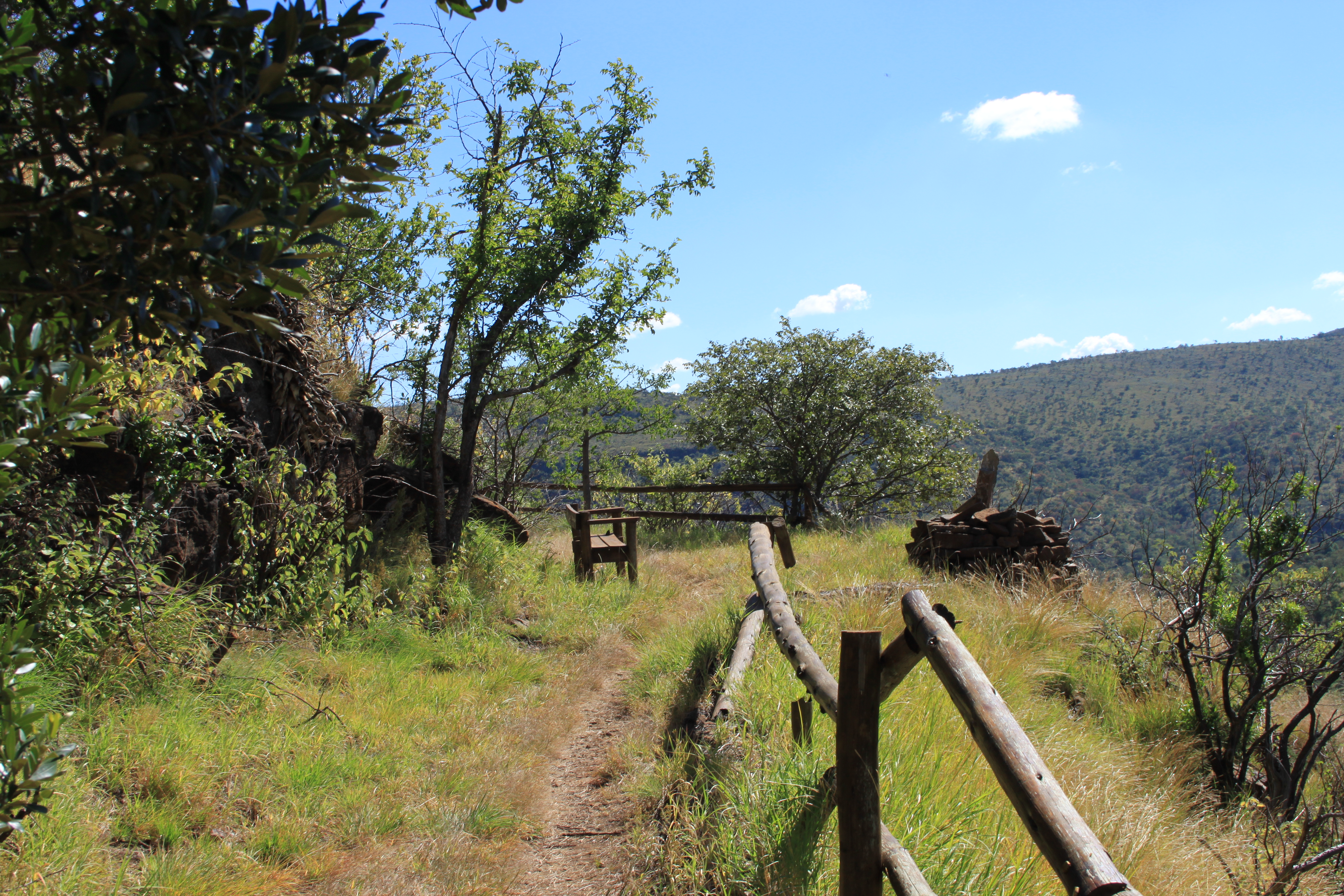
- Scenic landscape near Mokopane

- Location within Limpopo Location within South Africa
- Coordinates: 24°11′S 29°01′E
- Country: South Africa
- Province: Limpopo
- District: Waterberg
- Municipality: Mogalakwena
- Established: 1852

Area
  - Total: 75.13 km^{2} (29.01 sq mi)

Population (2011)
  - Total: 30,151
  - Density: 401.3/km^{2} (1,039/sq mi)
- Time zone: UTC+2 (SAST)
- Postal code: 0600
- Area code: 015

Mokopane (formerly Potgietersrus) is a town in the Waterberg District of the Limpopo province, South Africa.

Located approximately two hours north of Gauteng by road, the town serves as an agricultural and mining hub and a major thoroughfare for travelers en route to Botswana, Zimbabwe, and the Kruger National Park.

== History ==
The area was historically inhabited by the Kekana and Langa Ndebele and Northern Sotho peoples. In 1852, Voortrekker pioneers established a settlement and initially named it Vredenburg ("Town of Peace"). It was later renamed Potgietersrus in memory of Voortrekker leader Piet Potgieter, who was killed in 1854 during the Siege of Makapansgat.

In 2003, the South African government officially changed the town's name from Potgietersrus to Mokopane, in honour of King/Chief Mokopane (Makapan) of the Kekana Ndebele.

== Geography and climate ==
Mokopane is situated in the Bushveld biome, characterized by acacia savannas, aloes, and rocky hills. It is positioned at the base of the Waterberg Plateau. The climate is semi-arid with hot summer days, occasional afternoon thunderstorms, and mild, dry winters.

== Economy ==
=== Mining ===
Mokopane is situated along the Northern Limb (Platreef) of the Bushveld Igneous Complex, one of the richest mineral deposits in the world. The Mogalakwena Mine, located near Mokopane and operated by Anglo American Platinum, is the largest open-pit platinum mine in the world. The area also hosts large-scale development projects for platinum group metals, nickel, and copper.

=== Agriculture ===
The region surrounding Mokopane is a major producer of citrus fruit, wheat, maize, cotton, peanuts, and tobacco, as well as beef cattle and game farming. The nearby Zebediela Citrus Estate, located approximately 55 km (34 mi) southeast of the town, is one of the largest citrus plantations in the Southern Hemisphere.

== Heritage and tourism ==
- Makapansgat Valley: Located approximately 15 km (9.3 mi) north of Mokopane, Makapansgat is a renowned archaeological and paleoanthropological site. Inscribed as an extension of the Cradle of Humankind UNESCO World Heritage Site, its cave deposits have yielded hominin fossils (including Australopithecus africanus) dating back over 3 million years, as well as Early, Middle, and Late Stone Age artefacts in the Cave of Hearths.
- Mokopane Biodiversity Conservation Centre: A breeding centre and zoo managed by the National Zoological Garden of South Africa, housing indigenous and exotic wildlife species.
- Arend Dieperink Museum: A local cultural history museum depicting the prehistoric, Sotho, Ndebele, and Voortrekker history of the district.

== Transport ==
Mokopane is a major road transportation nexus in Limpopo:

- The N1 national highway bypasses the town, linking it southwards to Pretoria and Johannesburg and northwards to Polokwane and the Beitbridge border post with Zimbabwe.
- The N11 highway connects Mokopane north-westwards to Mokopane/Groblersdal and southwards towards Mpumalanga and KwaZulu-Natal.
- The R101 regional route passes directly through the central business district.

== Education ==
Mokopane is served by several public and independent primary and secondary educational institutions, including:

- Hoërskool Piet Potgieter
- Mokopane English Combined School (MECS)
- Thorntree Academy
- Hoërskool Waterberg
- Mokopane Primary School
- Potgietersrus Primary School
