= Waterberg District Municipality =

Waterberg
- District Municipality
- Seal

- Location in Limpopo
- Coordinates: 24°42′S 28°24′E
- Country: South Africa
- Province: Limpopo
- Seat: Modimolle
- Local municipalities: List: Thabazimbi; Lephalale; Modimolle–Mookgophong; Bela-Bela; Mogalakwena

Government
  - Type: Municipal council
  - Mayor: Rosina Mokgotlane

Area
  - Total: 44,913 km^{2} (17,341 sq mi)

Population (2011)
  - Total: 679,336
  - Density: 15.126/km^{2} (39.175/sq mi)

Racial makeup (2016)
  - Black African: 91.3%
  - Coloured: 0.3%
  - Indian/Asian: 0.4%
  - White: 8.1%

First languages (2011)
  - Sepedi: 56.4%
  - Tswana: 11.5%
  - Tsonga: 8.3%
  - Afrikaans: 7.7%
  - Other: 16.1%
- Time zone: UTC+2 (SAST)
- Municipal code: DC36

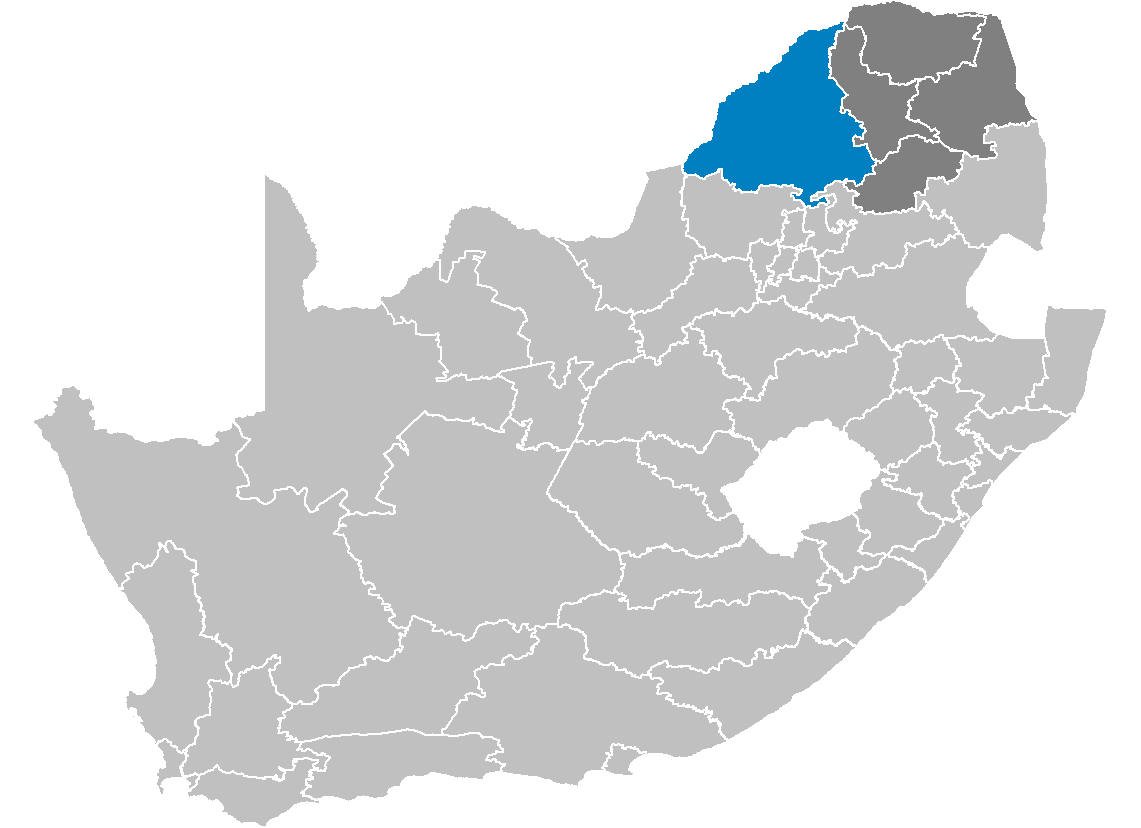
Pre-2011 map of South Africa showing Waterberg (within Limpopo province)

The Waterberg District Municipality (Northern Sotho: Mmasepala wa Selete wa Waterberg; Tswana: Mmasepala wa Sedika wa Waterberg) is one of the 5 districts of the Limpopo province of South Africa. The seat is Modimolle. As of 2016, the majority of its 745,758 residents spoke Sepedi, also known as Northern Sotho. The district code is DC36. The area is administered by tribal tribal communities. It consists of 12 traditional leaders in the district: Babirwa, Lebelo Kgomo, Seleka, Lekalakala, Mokopane (Kekana), Mapela, Litho, Ledwaba (Nkidikitlana), Shongoane, Bakone (Matlala), Tauetsoala & Langa. Bakenburg.

== Geography ==
The municipality contains much of the Waterberg Biosphere, a UNESCO desLanga, Mapela, Bakoneignated Biosphere Reserve. The Waterberg Biosphere is a massif of approximately 654,033 hectare. Waterberg is the first region in the northern part of South Africa to be named as a Biosphere Reserve by UNESCO. The extensive rock formation was shaped by hundreds of millions of years of riverine erosion to yield diverse bluff and butte landform. The ecosystem can be characterised as a dry deciduous forest or Bushveld. Within the Waterberg there are archaeological finds dating to the Stone Age, and nearby are early evolutionary finds related to the origin of humans.

The following sets forth neighboring municipalities and principal municipalities within the Waterberg District Municipality:

=== Neighbours ===
Waterberg is surrounded (clockwise) by:

- Vhembe (DC34) to the north-east
- Capricorn (DC35) to the east
- Sekhukhune (CBDC3) to the south-east
- Nkangala (DC31) to the south-east
- Bojanala Platinum (DC37) to the south
- Ngaka Modiri Molema (DC38) to the south-west
- City of Tshwane Metropolitan Municipality to the south
- the Kgatleng District of the republic of Botswana to the west

=== Local municipalities ===
The district contains the following local municipalities:

Local municipality	Population	%	Dominant language
Mogalakwena	325 291	43.62%	Sepedi (Northern Sotho)
Lephalale	140 240	18.81%	Sepedi (Northern Sotho)
Modimolle–Mookgophong	107 699	14.44%	Sepedi (Northern Sotho)
Thabazimbi	96 232	12.90	Setswana
Bela-Bela	76 296	10.23	Sepedi (Northern Sotho)

Source: Statistics South Africa, Community Survey 2015

== Demographics ==
The following statistics are from the 2016 Community Survey

Language	Population	%
Sepedi (Northern Sotho)	450 575	60.42
Setswana	91 750	12.30
Xitsonga	47 738	6.40
Afrikaans	57 832	7.75
Isindebele	15 672	2.10
Sesotho	14 791	1.98
Isixhosa	11 763	1.58
English	7 690	1.03
Tshivenda	7 021	0.94
Isizulu	4 284	0.57
Siswati	1372	0.18

=== Gender ===
Gender	Population	%
Female	364 265	48.84%
Male	381 493	51.16%

=== Ethnic group ===
Ethnic group	Population	%
Black African	680 815	91.29
White	59 998	8.05
Coloured	2 272	0.30
Indian/Asian	2 673	0.36

=== Age ===
Age	Population	%
000 - 004	98 391	13.19 %
005 - 009	84 122	11.28 %
010 - 014	74 195	9.95 %
015 - 019	64 258	8.62 %
020 - 024	66 169	8.87 %
025 - 029	70 743	9.49 %
030 - 034	57 856	7.76 %
035 - 039	45 331	6.08 %
040 - 044	38 129	5.11 %
045 - 049	34 767	4.66 %
050 - 054	29 852	4.00 %
055 - 059	24 442	3.28 %
060 - 064	19 397	2.6 %
065 - 069	13 120	1.76 %
070 - 074	10 651	1.43 %
075 - 079	7 386	0.99 %
080 - 084	3 783	0.51 %
085 +	3 167	0.42 %

== Politics ==
=== Election results ===
Election results for Waterberg in the South African Municipal election, 2016

Party	Votes	%
African National Congress	95 383	57.87 %
Democratic Alliance	26 791	16.26 %
Freedom Front Plus	4 403	2.67 %
United Christian Democratic Party	357	0.22 %
Pan African Congress	370	0.22 %
Congress of The People	1467	0.89 %
Economic Freedom Fighters	32 578	19.77 %
Mogalakwena Residents	1 253	0.76 %
South African Christian	308	0.19 %
Thabazimbi Residents	1900	1.15 %
Total	0	100.00%

== See also ==
- Municipal Demarcation Board
