= R40 (South Africa) =

Road in South Africa

Provincial route R40

Route information
- Maintained by SANRAL, RAL and MDPWRT
- Length: 310 km (190 mi)

Major junctions
- North end: R71 near Phalaborwa
- R37 in Mbombela; R38 in Barberton
- South end: MR20 at the Eswatini border near Bulembu

Location
- Country: South Africa
- Major cities: Phalaborwa, Hoedspruit, Hazyview, White River, Mbombela, Barberton

Highway system
- Numbered routes of South Africa
← R39	→ R41

The R40 is a provincial route in South Africa that connects the Eswatini border at Bulembu via Barberton, Mbombela, Bushbuckridge, Acornhoek and Hoedspruit with Phalaborwa. The route spans two provinces and passes through several private game reserves.

== Route ==
Detailed Route

=== Mpumalanga ===
The R40 has its southern terminus on the Eswatini border at the Josefsdal Border Post, with the town of Bulembu on the other side of the border. It begins by heading north through the eastern part of the Songimvelo Game Reserve before entering the Mountainlands Nature Reserve, where it turns to the north-west.

The R40 enters the northern outskirts of Barberton, where it reaches a junction with the R38 road and Sheba Road north of the Barberton CBD. The R38 joins the R40 and they are one road west-north-west for 7 km as Dikbas Avenue, bypassing Emjindini. After crossing the Queen's River north-west of Barberton, the R38 splits at a t-junction and becomes its own road south-west (Nelshoogte Pass) while the R40 turns northwards to bypass the Barberton Airport and skirt the eastern boundary of the Barberton Nature Reserve.

The R40 proceeds as the Hilltop Pass to enter Mbombela (capital of Mpumalanga) as Madiba Drive. It reaches a junction with the main east–west street of Mbombela (R104 road; Samora Machel Drive) west of the CBD before crossing over the Crocodile River to enter Riverside. In Riverside, the R40 meets the southern terminus of the R37 road and bypasses the Lowveld National Botanical Garden before passing under the Mbombela Northern Bypass (N4 national route; Maputo Corridor) and leaving Mbombela towards the north-east.

As it enters White River in a north-easterly direction, it is intersected from the left (north) by the R537 road. The R40 continues through the town eastwards as its main road (Chief Mgiyeni Khumalo Drive). Midway through the town centre, the R40 meets the R538 and turns north to be co-signed with it through the Kingsview suburb as Theo Kleynhans Street. North of the town, it passes through a large roundabout, where the R538 becomes its own road eastwards while the R40 continues north.

It heads on its winding northward journey, first passing the Klipkopjes Dam to the west and later the Da Gama Dam to its east, where the road takes a north-easterly direction and eventually t-junctions with the R538 again. At this intersection, the R40 turns north and enters the town of Hazyview, where it meets the R536 road before crossing the Sabie River. Just after crossing the Sabie River, it meets the R535 road. Leaving Hazyview, it crosses the Marite River. On its northward journey it passes between the Injaka Dam to the west and the Bosbokrand Nature Reserve to the east. It continues northwards passing an area of many small villages and hamlets, including Bushbuckridge and Rooiboklaagte. It crosses into the Limpopo Province at Acornhoek.

=== Limpopo ===
Crossing into Limpopo Province it crosses the Klaserie River and intersects with the R531 where it turns north passing through private game reserves and eventually enters Hoedspruit from the south (where it meets the R527 road next to the Air Force Base Hoedspruit). Passing through Hoedspruit, it leaves in a north-westerly direction passing through more private game reserves before crossing the Olifants River and shortly thereafter intersecting the R526 at Mica. Changing direction to the north-east, it eventually crosses the Ga-Selati River and after a short distance, the R40's northern terminus is a t-junction with the R71 road, 5 kilometres west of Phalaborwa.
