= R521 (South Africa) =

Regional route in South Africa

Regional route R521

Route information
- Length: 204 km (127 mi)

Major junctions
- North end: Pontdrif border with Botswana
- R572 near Mapungubwe National Park; R572 in Alldays; R523 near Vivo; R522 in Vivo
- South end: R101 in Polokwane

Location
- Country: South Africa

Highway system
- Numbered routes of South Africa
← R520	→ R522

The R521 is a Regional Route in Limpopo, South Africa that connects the border with Botswana at Pontdrif with Polokwane via Alldays.

== Route ==
It begins at the Pontdrif Border Post with Botswana on the Limpopo River. From there, it runs southwards for 12 kilometres to reach a junction with the R572. The R572 joins the R521 and they are cosigned southwards for 46 kilometres to reach Alldays, where the R572 becomes the road westwards and the R521 remains as the road southwards. It heads southwards for 146 kilometres, meeting the western termini of the R523 and R522 routes at Vivo, to enter the city of Polokwane (capital of Limpopo), where it ends in the city centre at a junction with the R101.
