= R572 (South Africa) =

Regional route in South Africa

Regional route R572

Route information
- Length: 320 km (200 mi)

Major junctions
- South-west end: R510 near Lephalale
- N11 near Grobler's Bridge; R561 near Maasstroom; R521 in Alldays; R521 near Pontdrif
- North-east end: N1 in Musina

Location
- Country: South Africa
- Towns: Alldays, Musina

Highway system
- Numbered routes of South Africa
← R571	→ R573

The R572 is a Regional Route in South Africa that connects the R510 near Lephalale with Musina via Alldays.

== Route ==
Its south-western origin is a junction with the R510 approximately 34 kilometres north of Lephalale (40 kilometres east of the Stockpoort border with Botswana). It heads north-east, starting by crossing the Mokolo River before crossing the N11 at Tom Burke (just south-east of Grobler's Bridge). It continues north-east passing through Swartwater, after which it heads east and crosses the R561 at Maasstroom. It crosses the Mogalakwena River and reaches Alldays, where it meets the R521 and joins it to be co-signed north for approximately 46 kilometres. At a junction just before the Pontdrif border with Botswana, the R572 splits from the R521 to become its own road eastwards, forming the southern boundary of Mapungubwe National Park. It heads eastwards to end in the northern part of Musina (12 kilometres south of Beitbridge) at an interchange with the N1.
