= 2024 Mmamatlakala bus crash =

2024 bus accident in Limpopo, South Africa

Mmamatlakala bus accident

Details
- Date: 28 March 2024
- Location: Regional route R518; 5 km (3.1 mi) west from Mmamatlakala, Mogalakwena Local Municipality, Limpopo
- Coordinates: 23°58′33″S 28°32′07″E
- Country: South Africa
- Incident type: Roadway departure over a bridge resulting in catastrophic fire on bus
- Cause: Driver lost control

Statistics
- Vehicles: 1
- Passengers: 46
- Deaths: 45
- Injured: 1

On 28 March 2024, a passenger bus crashed near Mmamatlakala in Limpopo, the northernmost province of South Africa, killing 45 people and leaving an eight-year-old girl, who sustained serious injuries, as the sole survivor. According to the South African Department of Transport, the incident occurred when the driver lost control. The bus went over a bridge and then caught on fire. The bus was transporting Easter pilgrims from Molepolole, Botswana, to Moria, South Africa.

== Background ==
South Africa has one of the most developed road networks in Africa but one of the worst safety records. During the four-day-long Easter weekend in 2023, the country recorded 185 fatal automobile incidents that resulted in 225 fatalities. In a statement made hours before the crash, President Cyril Ramaphosa urged South Africans to take caution on the roads during the Easter weekend, stating that the event "does not have to be a time where we sit back and wait to see statistics on tragedy or injuries on our roads."

The Zion Christian Church, the largest denomination in southern Africa, is headquartered in Moria and attracts millions of Christians from South Africa and surrounding countries with its annual Easter pilgrimages. The 2024 pilgrimage was the first in the town since the COVID-19 pandemic.

== Crash ==
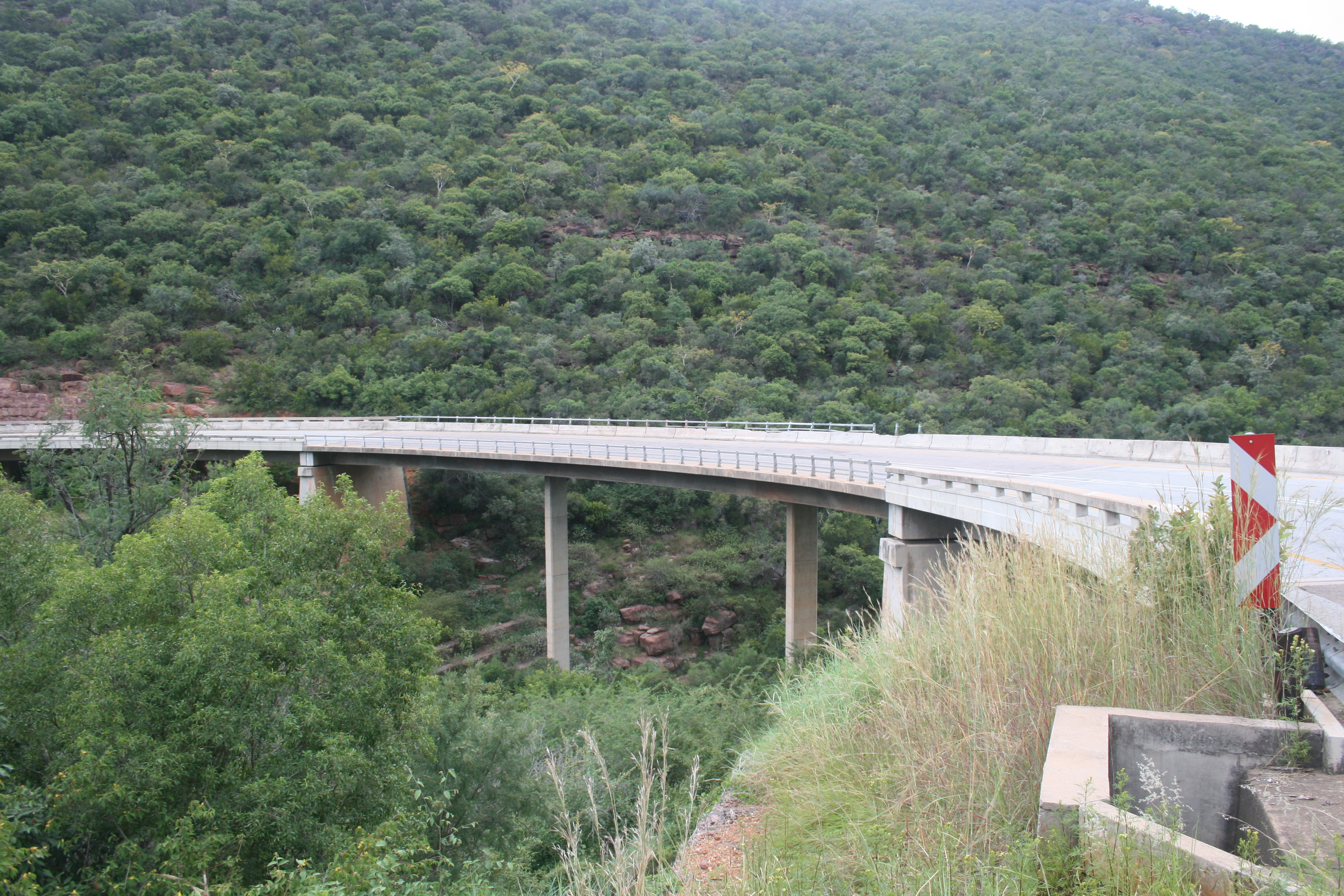
The bridge in Kloof Pass, near Mmamatlakala, seen in 2021

The bus had a Botswana licence plate and had been carrying pilgrims from the St. Engenas Zion Christian Church in Molepolole, around an hour from Gaborone, who were headed for an Easter church service in Moria. It had a total of 46 occupants and was travelling on the regional route 518 through the Kloof Pass, a mountainous route that contains numerous tight bends. Initial information suggested the driver had missed the turn-off for the much smoother N11 national route.

The bus fell off the side of the Mmamatlakala Bridge, in Mmamatlakala between Mokopane and Marken, and into the ravine, catching fire after impact on a rocky surface about 50 metres (160 ft) under the bridge. The South African Transport Ministry said the driver lost control of the bus, which caused it to collide with barriers and go off the side of the bridge. It was also pulling a trailer, according to rescue workers, adding additional weight. The fire involved gas canisters, which many passengers were carrying to use for cooking. Surviving passengers were trapped in the wreckage but could not be reached quickly by rescuers before they were burnt alive.

Rescue operations commenced and continued until the late evening hours.

== Casualties ==
Forty-five people died in the crash. The sole survivor, an 8-year-old girl, was hospitalized with serious injuries. She had been accompanied by her grandmother, who died, and was later reported to be in stable condition, with minor lacerations to her arms, legs, head and back. The driver and passengers were all citizens of Botswana. The girl was released on 3 April and repatriated to Botswana by air accompanied by her mother.

Some of the bodies were burned beyond recognition, while others were hard to reach due to debris scattered over the crash scene. One woman died after being airlifted from the scene. As of 29 March, 34 bodies had been recovered from the scene, only nine of them identifiable. Autopsies on the victims were conducted on 2 April.

On 4 May, a mass funeral for 44 of the victims was held in Molepolole, Botswana.

== Responses ==
President Ramaphosa sent condolences to Botswanan President Mokgweetsi Masisi, and pledged support to the nation. Masisi sent two cabinet ministers to South Africa to support the families of the victims. South African Transport Minister Sindisiwe Chikunga travelled to the scene of the crash, where she called for responsible driving during the Easter weekend and offered thoughts and prayers for the victims' families. She added that the South African government would assist in repatriating the corpses to Botswana and hold a full inquiry. Botswanan Foreign Minister Lemogang Kwape called the incident a catastrophe, and said that he had received a call from his South African counterpart Naledi Pandor to update him about the situation. On 2 April, national health minister Joe Phaahla and his provincial counterpart Phophi Ramathuba visited the sole survivor of the crash at Mokopane Hospital. Phaahla described her survival as "miraculous".

== See also ==
- Transport in South Africa
- 2023 Venice bus crash
- 2020 Centane bus crash
- 2018 Chongqing bus crash
- Sol Plaatje Dam bus crash
