= Riverside, Mbombela =

Suburb of Mbombela, South Africa

Riverside
- Suburb
- Riverside City Improvement District
- Location within Mpumalanga Location within South Africa Location within Africa
- Coordinates: 25°25′43.6″S 30°57′41.8″E
- Country: South Africa
- Province: Mpumalanga
- District: Ehlanzeni
- Municipality: Mbombela
- Main Place: Mbombela

Area
  - Total: 2.29 km^{2} (0.88 sq mi)

Population (2011)
  - Total: 382
  - Density: 167/km^{2} (432/sq mi)

Racial makeup (2011)
  - Black African: 55.2%
  - White: 34.3%
  - Coloured: 6%
  - Indian/Asian: 4.5%

First languages (2011)
  - Afrikaans: 29.5%
  - English: 28.3%
  - Swazi: 15.6%
  - Pedi: 6.5%
  - Other: 20.1%
- Time zone: UTC+2 (SAST)
- Postal code (street): 1226
- PO box: 1226
- Area code: 013

Riverside is a suburb of Mbombela in Mpumalanga, South Africa and is situated 4 km north of the Mbombela CBD. The suburb, which is categorised as a City Improvement District (CID), is situated on the western banks of the Crocodile and Nels rivers.

== History ==
The concept of Riverside was brought about in the early 1990s when Halls Properties realised the potential of the land. It also donated land to the Mpumalanga Provincial Government for the development of the new Provincial Government complex when Mbombela (then Nelspruit) obtained provincial capital status. The development of Riverside was also largely as a result of the need for additional land for light industrial development in Mbombela.

The development of two planned townships, Riverside Park and Riverside Industrial was approved in 1995. In November 2004, following a successful application, Riverside Park Phase 1 was established as a legalised City Improvement District. Later in 2009, Phase 1 became operational, and shortly after in March 2010, the municipal council of the City of Mbombela approved an amended business plan which expanded the previously legislated boundaries of its je Riverside Park CID to include both Phase 1 and 2. In 2015, Riverside Industrial City Improvement District (CID) was established as a separate CID after the application was approved by the city.

== Riverside Industrial ==
Riverside Industrial CID, situated south of the R37 and east of the R40, is a predominantly light-industrial suburb mainly comprising commercial land use.

== Riverside Park ==
Riverside Park CID is a mixed-use development mainly comprising a mixture of commercial, residential and retail land use. It is bordered by the Lowveld National Botanical Gardens to the east. The main thoroughfare through Riverside Park is the R40, also known as Madiba Drive, in which Phase 1 is situated east of Madiba Drive and Phase 2 is situated west thereof.

The area is anchored by four main developments:

- Mpumalanga Provincial Government complex (includes Office of the Premier and provincial departments)
- Riverside Mall (one of the largest shopping centres in Mpumalanga)
- Tsogo Sun's Emnotweni Casino
- Southern Sun Mbombela

Other significant developments or components of Riverside Park include The Grove Riverside Shopping Centre, Makro (The only Makro outlet in Mpumalanga) and the Lowveld National Botanical Garden (situated on the banks of the Crocodile River and east of Riverside Park).

== Transport ==
Riverside straddles along the R40 (Madiba Drive) connecting White River to the north with Barberton to the south. The R37 from Mashishing in the north-west terminates at the intersection with the R40 in Riverside.
