= R523 road =

R523 road may refer to:

- R523 road (Ireland)
- R523 road (South Africa)
