= R543 (South Africa) =

Regional route in South Africa

Regional route R543

Route information
- Length: 229 km (142 mi)

Major junctions
- West end: R34 at Vrede
- R23 / N11 at Volksrust; R33 / N2 at Piet Retief
- East end: Mahamba border post with Eswatini

Location
- Country: South Africa
- Major cities: Vrede, Volksrust, Wakkerstroom, Piet Retief

Highway system
- Numbered routes of South Africa
← R542	→ R544

The R543 is a Regional Route in South Africa that connects Vrede with the Mahamba Border Post with Eswatini via Volksrust, Wakkerstroom and Piet Retief.

== Route ==
=== Free State ===
Its western terminus is the R34 in Vrede, Free State. It leaves the town to the east, crossing the provincial border into Mpumalanga.

=== Mpumalanga ===
At Volksrust it meets the southern terminus of the R23 before intersecting with the N11 (co-signed for 1.2 kilometres northwards). Leaving the town to the east, it pass through Wakkerstroom, running close to the border with KwaZulu-Natal. After leaving Wakkerstroom, it bends slightly to the north, taking an east-north-easterly direction to Piet Retief, where it joins the co-signed N2 and R33 southwards for 600 metres before continuing east. Leaving the town, it heads south-east to the Eswatini border at Mahamba Border Post. After crossing into Eswatini, the road is designated MR-9.
