= R518 (South Africa) =

Regional route in South Africa

Regional route R518

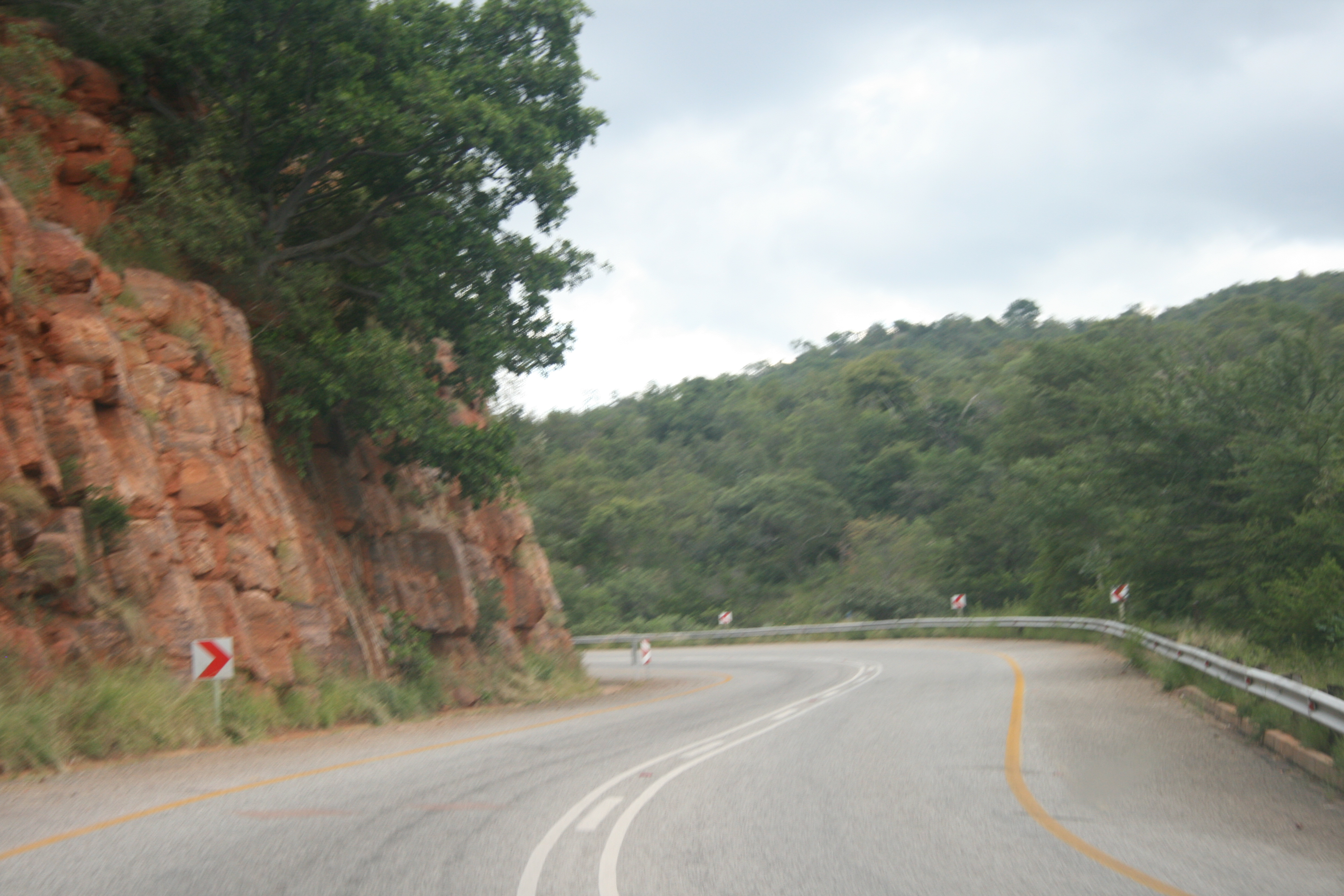

Route information
- Length: 253 km (157 mi)

Major junctions
- West end: R510 in Lephalale
- R561 in Marken; N11 / R101 in Mokopane; R519 in Zebediela; R579 in Lebowakgomo
- East end: R37 near Lebowakgomo

Location
- Country: South Africa

Highway system
- Numbered routes of South Africa
← R517	→ R519

The R518 is a Regional Route in South Africa that connects Lephalale with Zebediela via Mokopane.

== Route ==
Its western terminus is an intersection with the R510 at Lephalale (Ellisras). It goes east for 69 kilometres to meet the southern terminus of the R561 at the village of Marken and turn southwards.

The R518 continues south, then south-east (partially as the Kloof Pass), for 103 kilometres to meet the N11 national route at Masehlaneng and enter the town of Mokopane. The R518 and the N11 become one road south-east into the city centre, bypassing Mahwelereng and Sekgakgapeng. In the city centre of Mokopane, the R518 and the N11 meet the R101 and all three routes are co-signed on the road southwards (Thabo Mbeki Drive).

At the 2nd junction afterwards, by Mokopane Mall, the R518 leaves Thabo Mbeki Drive (which remains designated as the R101 & N11) and becomes its own road south-east. After 6 kilometres, it crosses the N1 national route and continues south-east, then east, for 35 kilometres to reach the town of Zebediela. In Zebediela's eastern suburbs, the R518 meets the R519 and they are one road southwards for 2.5 kilometres before the R518 becomes its own road eastwards.

The R518 continues to enter the township of Lebowakgomo, where it meets with the R579 before continuing eastwards. Just east of Lebowakgomo, the R518 reaches its end at a junction with the R37 (Orrie Baragwanath Pass).

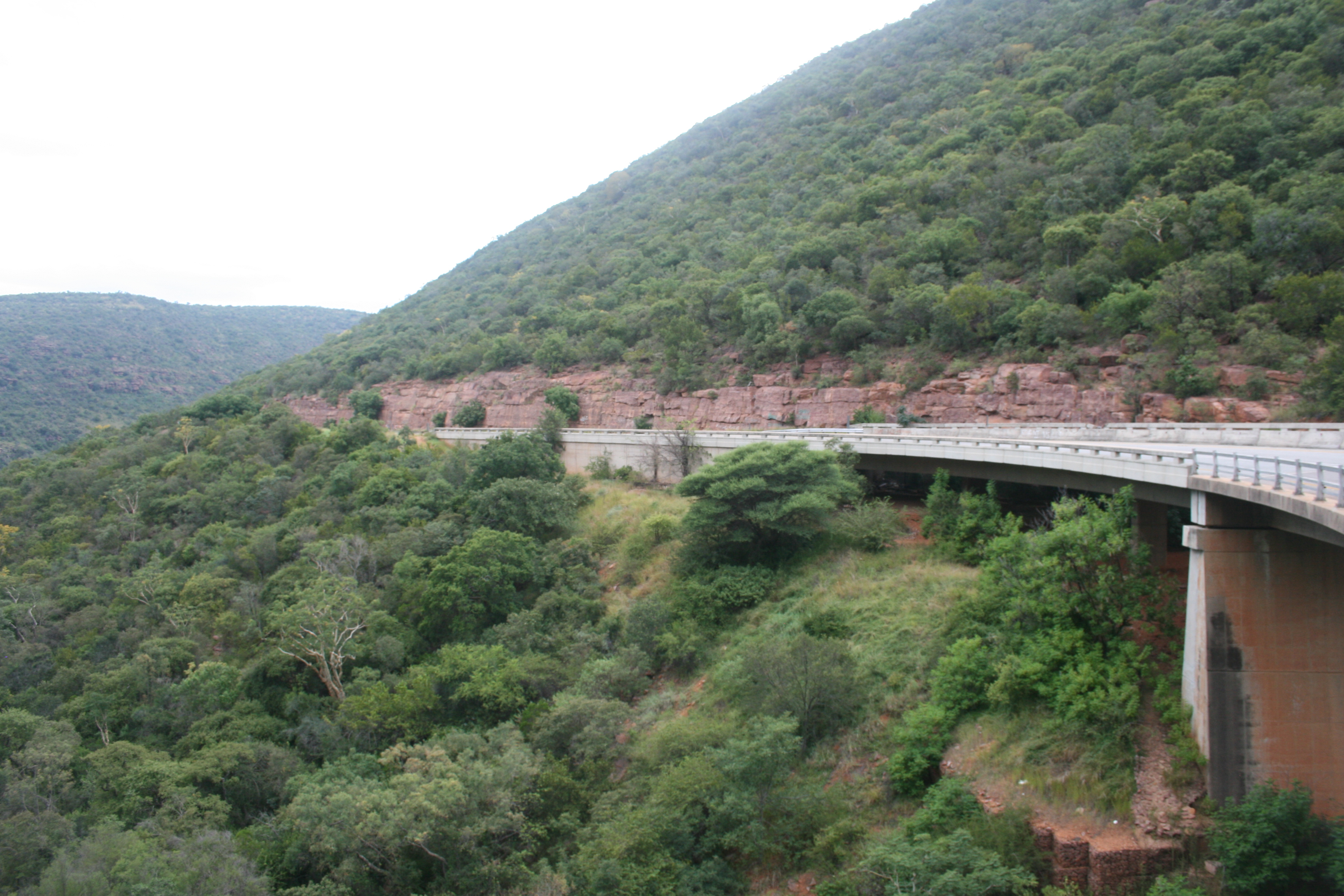
Kloof Pass near Mmamatlakala in the Waterberg Biosphere

== Incidents ==
=== 2024 Mmamatlakala bus crash ===
On 28 March 2024, a passenger bus heading from Molepolole, Botswana to Moria crashed approximately 5 kilometres west of the village of Mmamatlakala on the section of the R518 between Marken and Mokopane (Kloof Pass). It fell off the Mmamatlakala Bridge.
