= R522 road =

R522 road may refer to:

- R522 road (Ireland)
- R522 (South Africa)
