= R561 (South Africa) =

Regional route in South Africa

Regional route R561

Route information
- Length: 126 km (78 mi)

Major junctions
- North end: Zanzibar border post with Botswana
- R572 in Maasstroom; N11 in Baltimore
- South end: R518 in Marken

Location
- Country: South Africa

Highway system
- Numbered routes of South Africa
← R560	→ R562

The R561 is a Regional Route in Limpopo, South Africa that connects Marken with the Zanzibar border post with Botswana via Baltimore.

== Route ==
Its northern origin is the Zanzibar border post with Botswana on the Limpopo River. It heads south for 22 kilometres to cross the R572 at a staggered junction in the village of Maasstroom. It continues southwards for 66 kilometres to cross the N11 at a staggered junction in the village of Baltimore. It continues southwards for 37 kilometres to end at an intersection with the R518 in Marken.
