= R579 road =

R579 road may refer to:

- R579 road (Ireland)
- R579 (South Africa)
