= R614 road =

R614 road may refer to:

- R614 road (Ireland)
- R614 road (South Africa)
