= R510 road =

R510 road may refer to:

- R510 road (Ireland)
- R510 (South Africa)
