= R517 road =

R517 road may refer to:

- R517 road (Ireland)
- R517 (South Africa)
