= Pontdrif =

Border crossing between South Africa and Botswana

Pontdrif is a border crossing between South Africa and Botswana on the Limpopo River in Limpopo. The borderpost is situated just west of Mapungubwe National Park.

The crossing is impassable to vehicles when the Limpopo is in flood; an open steel cage cable car carries pedestrians across the river for a fee of R30 or P30 (May 2014).

	South Africa	Botswana
Region	Limpopo	Tuli
Nearest town	Alldays	
Road	R521	
GPS Coordinates	22.21697°S 29.13966°E	22.2141°S 29.1383°E
Telephone number	+27 (0) 15 575 1056	
Fax number	+27 (0) 15 575 1047	
Business hours	08:00 - 16:00	08:00 - 16:00
