= Baltimore, South Africa =

Coordinates: 23°16′S 28°26′E

Baltimore
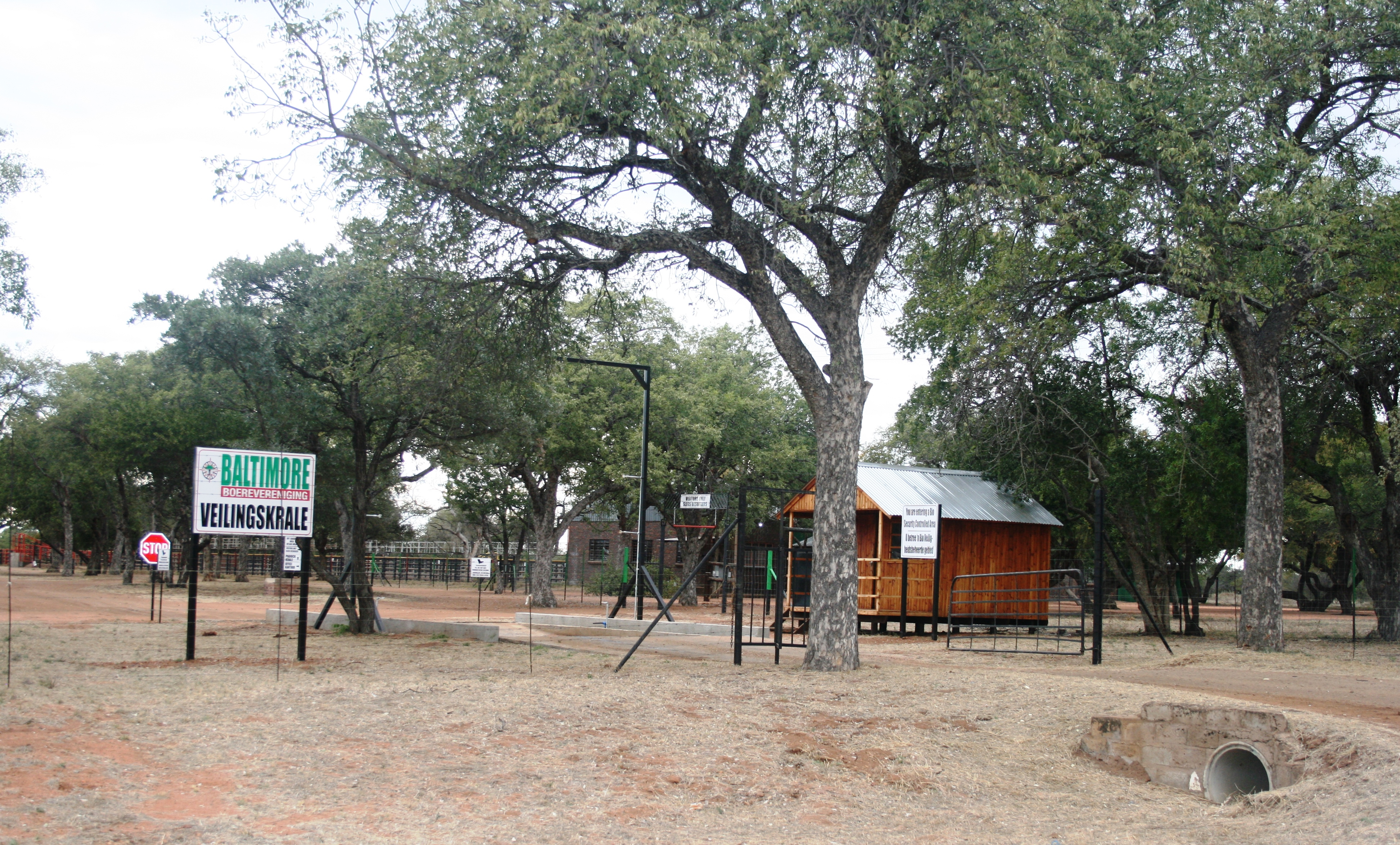
- Farmers' auction facilities at Baltimore
- Interactive map of Baltimore
- Country: South Africa
- Province: Limpopo
- District: Capricorn
- Municipality: Blouberg
- Time zone: UTC+2 (SAST)
- PO box: 0619

Baltimore is a small township situated on the N11 highway in the Limpopo province of South Africa. It is a main stop-over for the Groblersbrug Border Post with Botswana.

== Nature ==
The Wonderkop Nature Reserve is situated outside of town and preserves many native species, especially Sable antelope.
