= Venetia Limpopo Nature Reserve =

Nature reserve in South Africa

- Venetia Limpopo Nature Reserve Venetia Diamond Mine
- Coordinates: 22°22′51″S 29°17′27″E
- Venetia Limpopo Nature Reserve (South Africa) Venetia Limpopo Nature Reserve (Limpopo)

The Venetia Limpopo Nature Reserve is situated in the northernmost parts of South Africa, surrounding the Venetia diamond mine. The reserve is owned by the De Beers Diamond Mining Company. Across the road from the reserve is Mapungubwe National Park.

The reserve is approximately 33,000 ha in size, and is characterised by the dominant mopane (Colophospermum mopane) veld-type. Whilst scenic, the area is very hot — summer temperatures regularly pass the 40 degrees Celsius mark.

The reserve is home to lion, elephant and leopard. The reserve has additionally hosted African wild dogs managed by the Endangered Wildlife Trust.

In 2018, the De Beers company initiated a programme that would move 200 elephants from the Reserve to Mozambique, after their population grew too high within the reserve. At the time, it was one of the largest translocation projects in South African history. The company claims that seventy elephants can be accommodated at The Venetia Limpopo Nature Reserve without having adverse effects on the ecosystem.

== Venetia Diamond Mine ==
The Venetia Diamond Mine is South Africa's largest producer of diamonds, since 1995. It is situated close to the South African town of Alldays in the Limpopo province and is located within the reserve (22°26′02″S 29°18′50″E).

The open cast mine is one of De Beers’ six remaining diamond mines in South Africa and the only major diamond mine to be developed in the country during the past 25 years. As such, the mine represents one of De Beers’ single biggest investments in South Africa. The mine was opened in 1992 by Harry Oppenheimer, a former De Beers chairman.

In 2004 the mine had 955 employees and recovered 7,187,300 carats (1437.5 kg) of diamonds from 5,871,000 metric tons of ore.In 2021 the mine will cease its opencast operation and move towards underground mining extending the life of the mine by a further 21 years up to 2044.

The Kolope River flows 8 km to the west of the mine. Surface water storage dams have been built on two of its tributaries.
