= R37 (South Africa) =

Road in South Africa

Provincial route R37

Route information
- Maintained by SANRAL
- Length: 304 km (189 mi)

Major junctions
- Northwest end: R101 in Polokwane
- N1 in Polokwane; R555 in Burgersfort; R36 in Lydenburg; N4 near Mbombela
- Southeast end: R40 in Nelspruit

Location
- Country: South Africa
- Major cities: Polokwane, Burgersfort, Lydenburg, Mbombela

Highway system
- Numbered routes of South Africa
← R36	→ R38

The R37 is a provincial route in South Africa that connects Polokwane with Mbombela via Burgersfort and Lydenburg (Mashishing).

== Route ==
Detailed Route

The R37 begins in Polokwane Central (Capital of Limpopo), at a junction with the two one-way streets that form the R101 route (Grober Street & Thabo Mbeki Street), just west of the R101's intersection with the R71 route. It begins by going southwards as Kerk Street to form a junction with the Polokwane Eastern Bypass (N1 national route) and become the western border of the Polokwane Game Reserve.

The R37 heads southwards for 30 kilometres as the Chuniespoort Pass to meet the northern terminus of the R579 road. At this junction, it turns to the south-east and proceeds for 7 kilometres to meet the eastern terminus of the R518 road north of Lebowakgomo. At this junction, the R37 turns to the east and becomes the first section of the Orrie Baragwanath Pass. It goes eastwards for 25 kilometres to reach a junction south of Ga-Makgoba, where the Orrie Baragwanath Pass becomes the road to the north-east towards Ofcolaco while the R37 remains as the easterly road. Just after, the R37 crosses the Olifants River.

From the Olifants River crossing, the R37 heads south-east for 77 kilometres to enter the town of Burgersfort, after crossing the Steelpoort River, and reach a junction with the R555 road. The R555 and the R37 form one road south-east for almost 2 km up to the junction after Burgersfort Mall, where the R555 becomes its own road north-east while the R37 remains as the road heading south-south-east. The R37 heads south for 58 kilometres through farm orchards as the Watervalsrivier Pass, leaving the Limpopo Province and entering the Mpumalanga Province, to the city of Lydenburg (Mashishing).

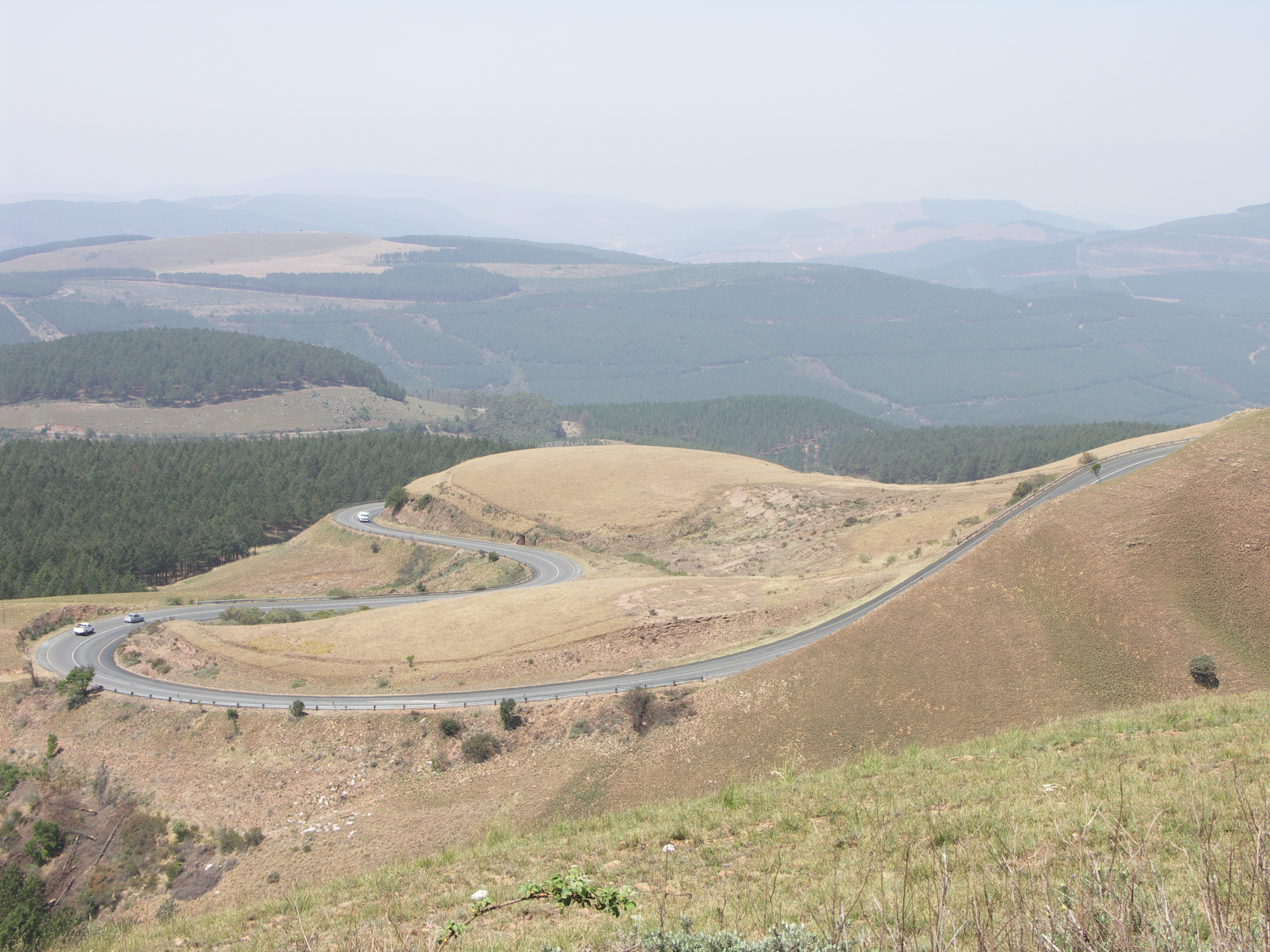
Long Tom Pass on the R37

In Lydenburg's northern suburbs, the R37 meets the R36 road and the two routes form one road southwards into the city centre as De Clerq Street, then east as 1st Street, before the R36 becomes its own road southwards towards Machadodorp at the Viljoen Street junction. The R37 continues eastwards as Voortrekker Street before heading up the Long Tom Pass. As the Long Tom Pass, it goes eastwards for 46 kilometres, as the pass zig-zags, to meet the southern terminus of the R532 road just south of the town of Sabie. The R532 to Sabie takes over as the Long Tom Pass.

From the R532 junction south of Sabie, the R37 goes south-south-east for 47 kilometres, meeting the eastern terminus of the R539 road, to reach the city of Mbombela (Capital of Mpumalanga). It first reaches an intersection with the Mbombela Northern Bypass (N4 national route; Maputo Corridor) before entering the suburb of Riverside and proceeding to reach its terminus at a junction with the R40 road (Madiba Drive), just next to the R40's Crocodile River crossing.
