= R522 (South Africa) =

Regional route in South Africa

Regional route R522

Route information
- Length: 71.7 km (44.6 mi)

Major junctions
- West end: R521 at Vivo
- East end: N1 at Louis Trichardt

Location
- Country: South Africa

Highway system
- Numbered routes of South Africa
← R521	→ R523

The R522 is a Regional Route in Limpopo, South Africa that connects Vivo with Louis Trichardt.

== Route ==
The R522 begins at a junction with the R521 road at Vivo and heads eastwards for 72 kilometres, through the Schoemansdal area, to enter the town of Louis Trichardt at Tshikota and reach its end at a junction with the N1 national route in the town centre of Louis Trichardt.
