= R616 (South Africa) =

Regional route in South Africa

Regional route R616

Route information
- Length: 34 km (21 mi)

Major junctions
- East end: N3 / N11 near Ladysmith
- West end: R74 in Bergville

Location
- Country: South Africa

Highway system
- Numbered routes of South Africa
← R614	→ R617

The R616 is a Regional Route in South Africa.

== Route ==
Its western terminus is the R74 at Bergville. It initially runs north-north-east, then east to end at an intersection with the N11 and the N3 near Ladysmith.
