= Hilltop Pass =

Hilltop Pass is situated in the Mpumalanga province of South Africa, on the R40 road between Nelspruit (Mbombela) and Barberton.
