= Alldays Airport =

- IATA: ADY; ICAO: FAAL

Summary
- Airport type: Public
- Serves: Alldays
- Location: Alldays, Limpopo, South Africa
- Elevation AMSL: 2,600 ft (790 m)
- Coordinates: 22°40′42″S 29°3′18″E
- Website: www.alldaysvliegklub.co.za

Map
- Location in Limpopo

Runways
Direction	Length		Surface
Direction	m	ft	Surface
10/28	1,450	4,757	Asphalt
- Source: DAFIF

Alldays Airport (IATA: ADY, ICAO: FAAL) is an airport serving Alldays, a town in the Limpopo province in South Africa.

== Facilities ==
The airport resides at an elevation of 2,600 feet (792 m) above mean sea level. It has one runway designated 10/28 with an asphalt surface measuring 1,450 by 30 metres (4,757 ft × 98 ft).

== See also ==
- List of airports in South Africa
