= R523 (South Africa) =

Regional route in South Africa

Regional route R523

Route information
- Length: 165 km (103 mi)

Major junctions
- East end: R524 in Thohoyandou
- N1 near Dzanani
- West end: R521 near Vivo

Location
- Country: South Africa

Highway system
- Numbered routes of South Africa
← R522	→ R524

The R523 is a Regional Route in Limpopo, South Africa that connects Thohoyandou with the R521 north of Vivo.

== Route ==
The R523 begins at a junction with the R524 in Thohoyandou. It heads north through the town as Main Road, bypassing the University of Venda and the Thohoyandou National Botanical Garden, to reach a four-way junction in Sibasa, where the R523 becomes the road to the west. It heads west for 62 kilometres, bypassing the Vondo Dam, through Dzanani, to reach a junction with the N1 national route (Wyllie's Poort Pass).

The R523 joins the N1 north-west for 5 kilometres before becoming the road to the west. It heads west for 67 kilometres, through Waterpoort (where it crosses the Sand River), to reach its end at a junction with the R521 road approximately 6 kilometres north of Vivo.
