= Ikhupe Pass =

- Location within KwaZulu-Natal
- Elevation: 1,469 metres (4,820 ft)
- Traversed by: N11

Third Approach
- Location: Ladysmith and Newcastle
- Coordinates: 28°09′14.6″S 29°58′07.3″E

Ikhupe Pass, Is situated in the KwaZulu-Natal province of South Africa, on the National road N11 between Ladysmith and Newcastle.
