= Josefsdal =

Border crossing between South Africa and Eswatini

Josefsdal is a border crossing between South Africa and Eswatini on the R40 road in Mpumalanga. The Eswatini side of the border post is known as Bulembu. The border is open between 08:00 and 16:00.

| | South Africa | Eswatini |
|---|---|---|
| Region | Mpumalanga | |
| Nearest town | Baberton | |
| Road | R40 | MR19 |
| GPS Coordinates | 25.9434°S 31.1183°E | 25.9439°S 31.1232°E |
| Telephone number | +27 (0) 13 712 3891 | |
| Fax number | +27 (0) 13 712 3891 | |
| Business hours | 08:00 - 16:00 | 08:00 - 16:00 |
