= Watervalsrivier Pass =

Mountain pass in South Africa

Watervalsrivier Pass (English: Waterfalls River) is a mountain pass, situated in the Mpumalanga province of South Africa, on the Burgersfort Road (R37) between Lydenburg and Burgersfort.
