= R579 (South Africa) =

Regional route in South Africa

Regional route R579

Route information
- Length: 171 km (106 mi)

Major junctions
- North end: R37 near Lebowakgomo
- R518 near Lebowakgomo
- South end: R33 near Stoffberg

Location
- Country: South Africa

Highway system
- Numbered routes of South Africa
← R578	→ R580

The R579 is a Regional Route in South Africa that connects Lebowakgomo with Stoffberg via Jane Furse.

== Route ==
Its northern origin is a junction with the R37 at the southern end of Chuniespoort pass in Limpopo Province. It heads south to intersect the R518 at Lebowakgomo. It heads south-south-east to bypass the town of Jane Furse before turning to the south and proceeding to cross into Mpumalanga Province and end at a junction with the R33 just north-west of Stoffberg.
