= Hoërskool Rob Ferreira High School =

Location
- Danie Joubert St, White River, 1240, South Africa; White River, Mpumalanga; South Africa; 25°19′39″S 31°00′36″E

Information
- School type: Public & Boarding
- Motto: Vorentoe (Afrikaans:Forward)
- Founded: 1954; 72 years ago
- Status: Open
- School district: Enhlazeni District
- Authority: Mpumalanga Department of Education
- Headmaster: D Oberholzer
- Grades: 8–12
- Age: 14 to 18
- Enrollment: 811 as of 2017
- Language: English and Afrikaans
- Schedule: 07:30 - 14:00
- Colours: Green; Orange; White
- Slogan: Ons Bloed is Oranje
- Mascot: Olifantjie
- Nickname: Robbies
- Feeder schools: White River Primary
- Website: www.Robbies.co.za

Hoërskool Rob Ferreira (Rob Ferreira High School) is a Public Afrikaans and English medium co-educational High School located in White River, Mpumalanga a province of South Africa. Learners are called Robbies.

== History ==
The school is named after the late Mr. Rob Ferreira, then L.U.R. In the old Transvaal Province government. Uncle Rob, as he was well-known, was a community man who strived to establish facilities for the community. Through his vision and mediation, Rob Ferreira High School was established. At that time, the grounds on which the school building, the sports ground and the hostel were situated was part of a farm belonging to Oom Rob. He then cut 28 hectares from the farm and donated to the then Department of Education for the establishment of the new school

Rob Ferreira High School grew like a loot from the old Witrivier Primary School, which changed status to a Junior High School in 1948. Thus, the school developed into an independent high school in 1954 with Mr. P. H. Cat acting as headmaster. The school building was completed in 1954 and the residence in 1959.
