= Sol Plaatje Dam bus crash =

2003 accident in South Africa

Details
- Date: 1 May 2003
- Location: Sol Plaatje Dam
- Coordinates: 28°13′06″S 28°21′47″E
- Country: South Africa

Statistics
- Deaths: 51

On 1 May 2003, a coach bus drove into the Saulspoort Dam near the town of Bethlehem, South Africa, killing 51 people.

== Overview ==
The bus was transporting trade union delegates to May Day celebrations in the town of QwaQwa in the Free State. The bus driver became disoriented when they passed through Bethlehem in the dark en route to the celebrations. Hopelessly lost, he appears to have turned accidentally onto an unlit gravel path, which led straight onto a jetty into the Saulspoort Dam. The driver was traveling much too fast to stop when the bus drove straight into the water.

Because of the remote location of the accident and the old bus's inadequate safety provisions, just ten people escaped the vehicle alive, all of them injured in the crash. The bus sank rapidly following impact with the water, trapping the passengers underwater inside the vehicle. Police did not arrive until the following morning after being notified by survivors, but were only able to recover the bodies of the dead and retrieve the bus as part of their investigation of the tragedy.

== Aftermath ==
President Thabo Mbeki held a minute's silence for the dead at his May Day speech the following day, and the dead were buried together in a mass funeral at West End (Weseinde) cemetery in Kimberley. The cause of the crash was believed to be negligence on the driver's part in his failure to prepare a route through a hazardous area, which was compounded by a lack of signs and gates on the dam's access roads. The bus was an old model, did not possess efficient emergency exits or safety equipment, and had poor brakes, which may have contributed to the disaster.

The dam was renamed the Sol Plaatje Dam on 1 April 2005.

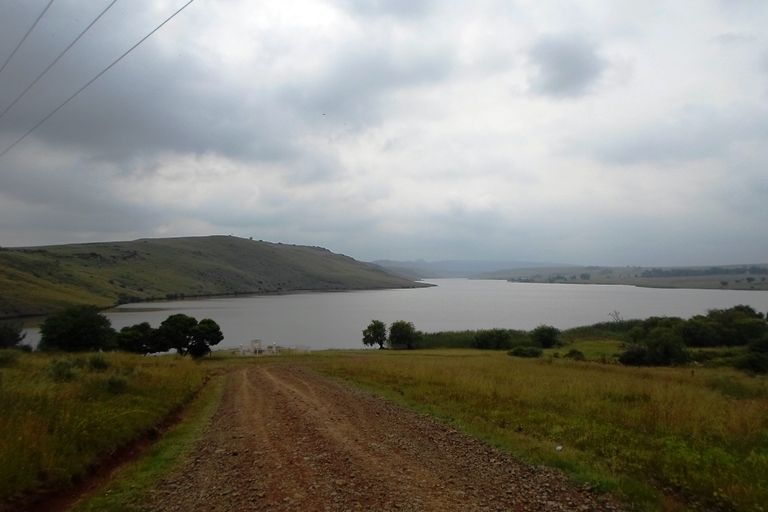
Sol Plaatje Dam, Bethlehem, South Africa

Leonard Slabbert, who used a boat to rescue the survivors, was awarded the Mendi Decoration for Bravery (since renamed Order of Mendi for Bravery) (Silver) on 30 November 2003.

== See also ==
- List of road accidents
