= Chuniespoort =

- Location within Limpopo Location within South Africa
- Coordinates: 24°13′45″S 29°29′48″E
- Country: South Africa
- Province: Limpopo
- District: Capricorn
- Municipality: Polokwane

Area
  - Total: 1.91 km^{2} (0.74 sq mi)

Population (2011)
  - Total: 1,271
  - Density: 665/km^{2} (1,720/sq mi)

Racial makeup (2011)
  - Black African: 100.0%

First languages (2011)
  - Northern Sotho: 92.5%
  - Tsonga: 4.6%
  - Zulu: 1.0%
  - Other: 1.8%
- Time zone: UTC+2 (SAST)
- Postal code (street): 0745
- PO box: 0745
- Area code: 015

Chuniespoort (recently Chuenespoort) is a mountain pass situated in the Limpopo Province, on the R37, the road between Polokwane and Lebowakgomo, South Africa. The river flowing through this gorge of the Strydpoort Mountains is known as the Chunies River, one of the tributaries of the Olifants River.

== Etymology ==
The pass is named for an African leader, whose name would be spelled Tshwene in modern Northern Sotho orthography.
