= Mahamba, Eswatini =

Coordinates: 27°06′S 31°05′E

Mahamba is a town in the Shiselweni district of southern Eswatini.

It has a border crossing point towards Piet Retief in South Africa. It is on the MR9 road.

An early Wesleyan mission station was established here in 1844. Robert Grendon moved here, probably before 1906, and his religious heterodoxy may have fuelled local religious strife.

There was a skirmish here in 1846 between Ohrigstad Boers and Swazi forces under Mswati.
