= Klipkopjes Dam =

- Interactive map of Klipkopjes Dam
- Official name: Klipkopjes Dam
- Country: South Africa
- Location: White River, Mpumalanga
- Coordinates: 25°12′25″S 30°59′54″E
- Purpose: Irrigation
- Opening date: 1960
- Owner: Department of Water Affairs

Dam and spillways
- Type of dam: Earth fill dam
- Impounds: White River
- Height: 20 m
- Length: 431 m

Reservoir
- Creates: Klipkopjes Dam Reservoir
- Total capacity: 12 607 000 m^{3}
- Catchment area: 76 km^{2}
- Surface area: 233.5 ha

Klipkopjes Dam is an earth-fill type dam located on the White River, near the town of White River, Mpumalanga, South Africa. It was established in 1960 and its primary purpose is to serve for irrigation. The hazard potential of the dam has been ranked high (3).

== See also ==
- List of reservoirs and dams in South Africa
- List of rivers of South Africa
