= Stockpoort =

Border crossing between South Africa and Botswana in the Limpopo province

Stockpoort is a border crossing between South Africa and Botswana in the Limpopo province. On the Botswana side the post is known as Parr's Halt. The Limpopo River separates the border posts.

	South Africa	Botswana
Name	Stockpoort	Parr's Halt
Region	Limpopo	Central
Road	R510	B145
GPS coordinates	23.4023°S 27.3527°E	23.4041°S 27.3597°E
Business hours	05:00 - 18:00	05:00 - 18:00
Telephone number	(014) 763 7934/5/6	
Fax number	(014) 763 7934/5/6	
