= R510 (South Africa) =

Regional route in South Africa

Regional route R510

Route information
- Length: 332 km (206 mi)

Major junctions
- South end: R104 Nelson Mandela Street, Rustenburg
- R556 near Sun City; R511 near Thabazimbi; R517 near Bulge River; R33 near Lephalale; R518 in Lephalale; R572
- North end: Stockpoort Border Post with Botswana

Location
- Country: South Africa
- Major cities: Lephalale, Thabazimbi, Rustenburg

Highway system
- Numbered routes of South Africa
← R509	→ R511

The R510 is a Regional Route in South Africa that connects Rustenburg with the Stockpoort Border with Botswana via Thabazimbi and Lephalale.

== Route ==
The northern end of the R510 is the Stockpoort border post with Botswana. It runs east for 43 kilometres before branching off the R572 and assuming a southerly direction, following the Mokolo River. It then continues to the town of Lephalale (Ellisras), where the R518 and the R33 both branch off, heading east. It continues south to Bulge River, where it branches off the R517, which heads south-east, before reaching Thabazimbi. Just south of Thabazimbi, the road junctions the R511 and continues heading south. It then passes through Northam before it crosses into the North West, skirting the eastern border of the Pilanesberg National Park. The R566 crosses it south of Monakato and it proceeds southwards to enter the city of Rustenburg, where it enters as Beneden Street, bypasses the Bospoort Dam on the Hex River, passes through the Boitekong township and bypasses the Rustenburg Airfield, to reach its end at an intersection with the R104 west of the Rustenburg city centre.
