= R517 (South Africa) =

Regional route in South Africa

Regional route R517

Route information
- Length: 54 km (34 mi)

Major junctions
- West end: R510 near Bulge River
- East end: R33 in Vaalwater

Location
- Country: South Africa

Highway system
- Numbered routes of South Africa
← R516	→ R518

The R517 is a Regional Route in Limpopo, South Africa.

== Route ==
Its north-western terminus is at a junction with the R510 near Bulge River. From there, heads south-east to the town of Vaalwater, where it ends at a junction with the R33.
