= N11 (South Africa) =

National road in South Africa

Coordinates: 25.768204°S 29.455462°E

National route N11

Route information
- Maintained by SANRAL
- Length: 773 km (480 mi)

Major junctions
- North end: Botswana border at Groblersbrug
- N1 near Mokopane; N4 near Middelburg; N2 / N17 in Ermelo
- South end: N3 near Ladysmith

Location
- Country: South Africa
- Provinces: Limpopo, Mpumalanga, KwaZulu-Natal
- Towns: Mokopane; Marble Hall; Groblersdal; Middelburg; Ermelo; Volksrust; Newcastle; Ladysmith

Highway system
- Numbered routes of South Africa
← N10	→ N12

The N11 is a national route in South Africa which runs from the Botswana border at Groblersbrug, through Mokopane, Middelburg, Ermelo and Newcastle to end at the N3 just after Ladysmith.

== Route ==
Detailed Route

=== Limpopo ===
The N11 begins at the Grobler's Bridge border with Botswana on the Limpopo River. On the Botswana side of the Limpopo River, the border post is known as Martin's Drift.

It begins by running south-east through Limpopo province for 190 kilometres to Mokopane. Upon entering Mokopane (at Masehlaneng), the N11 is joined by the R518 and they form one road into Mokopane Central.

At the junction with the R101 (Thabo Mbeki Drive) in the town centre, the N11 and the R518 join the R101 southwards. At the second junction afterwards (by Mokopane Mall), the R518 becomes its own road eastwards towards Zebediela, leaving the R101 and the N11 as the road southwards. After 11 km, the N11 becomes its own road towards the south-south-east and meets the N1 (southbound only) at the next junction just north of the N1's Nyl Toll Plaza.

The N11 continues southwards for 72 km to reach an intersection with the R33. The R33 joins the N11 and they become one road 15 km southwards into the town of Marble Hall, where they meet the north-eastern terminus of the R573 from Pretoria and KwaMhlanga. The R33 and N11 remain as one road for another 27 km south into the town of Groblersdal.

At the 4-way staggered junction with the north-eastern terminus of the R25 in Groblersdal, the R33 becomes the road eastwards, leaving the N11 as the road southwards. The N11 continues southwards for 85 km, following the Olifants River, to cross into Mpumalanga and reach the city of Middelburg.

=== Mpumalanga ===
It enters the city of Middelburg as Walter Sisulu Street. At the junction with Cowen Ntuli Street, the N11 meets the R555 and they all become the road eastwards on Cowen Ntuli Street through Middelburg Central.

Just after meeting the northern terminus of the R35, the R555 becomes its own road north-eastwards, leaving the N11 as the road eastwards. Just after the Eastdene suburb, the N11 meets the R104 and heads towards the south-east. After the Nazareth and Rockdale suburbs, it meets the N4 (Maputo Corridor). The N11 proceeds south-south-east for 55 km to the town of Hendrina, where it passes through the town as Church Street and intersects with the R38 (Beukes Street) in the town centre. It proceeds south-east for 50 km to the city of Ermelo, where it meets the N17 from Eswatini (Swaziland).

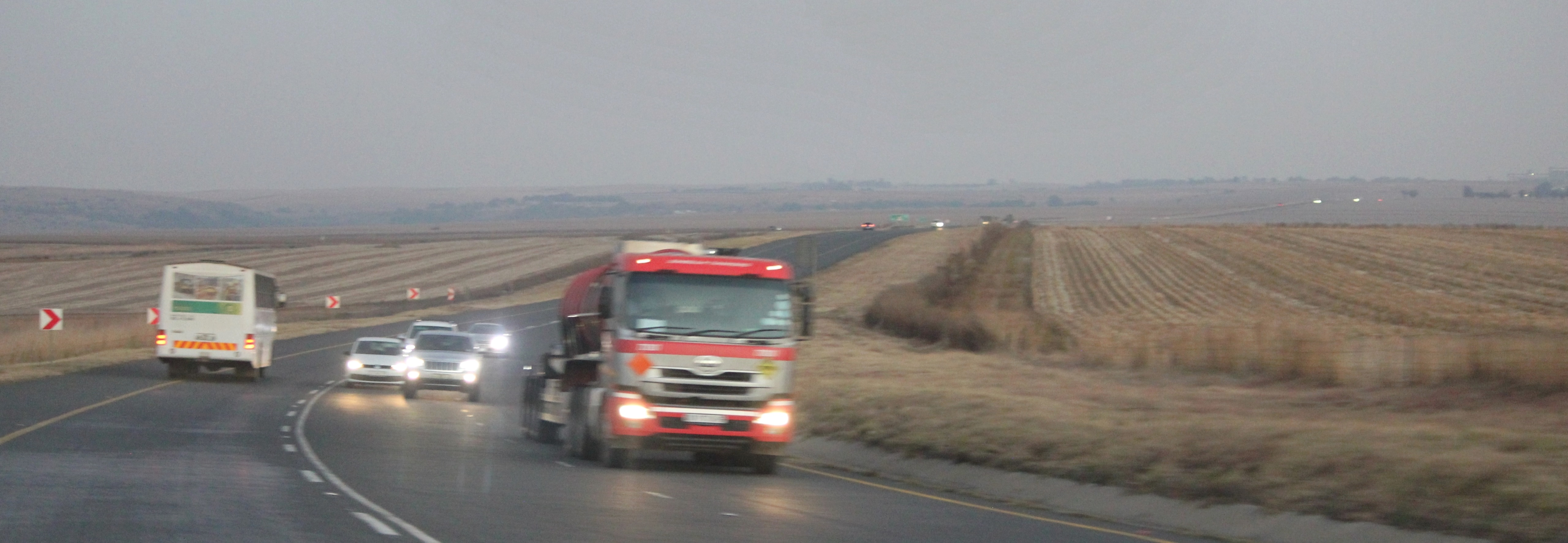
The route between Hendrina and Ermelo, Mpumalanga

At the Fourie Street junction, the N17 joins the N11 southwards up to the junction with Joubert Street, where the N17 continues westwards. At the Voortrekker Avenue junction, south of the Ermelo town centre, the N11 meets the terminus of the N2 from Piet Retief. From Ermelo, the N11 runs south for 97 km, through Amersfoort (where it meets the southern terminus of the R35), to the town of Volksrust, where it meets the south-eastern terminus of the R23 and becomes the Laing's Nek Pass. Just after, the N11 enters KwaZulu-Natal.

=== KwaZulu-Natal ===
From Volksrust, the N11 proceeds south for 45 km to reach the city of Newcastle. Just before Newcastle, the N11 is joined by the R34 for 7 km until they split at an off-ramp north-east of the city centre, where the N11 becomes the Newcastle Eastern Bypass. After bypassing the city centre, the N11 proceeds south for 95 km as the Ikhupe Pass, meeting the western terminus of the R68 (which connects to Dundee), to reach the city of Ladysmith. It crosses the Klip River in the city centre and turns westwards to reach an off-ramp intersection with the R103 adjacent to the Ladysmith Airport entrance. The N11 joins the R103 and they are one road south-south-west for 2.5 km before the N11 becomes its own road westwards. The N11 heads westwards for 13 km, meeting the north-eastern terminus of the R600 (which connects to Winterton), to reach its end at an off-ramp junction with the N3 highway just south of the N3's Tugela Toll Plaza (each ramp onto the N3 has a tollgate). West of this junction, the road continues as the R616 to Bergville.

== Junctions ==
=== Limpopo ===
Municipality	Location	km	mi	Exit	Destinations	Notes
B140 ends at Botswana–South Africa border; N11 begins
Lephalale	Groblersbrug	0	0	Groblersbrug Border Post		
Lephalale	Groblersbrug	0	0	—	R572, Lephalale, Alldays	At-grade intersection
Blouberg	Baltimore	0	0	—	R561 east, Alldays	At-grade intersection; Northern end of concurrency with R561
Blouberg	Baltimore	0	0	—	R561 west, Lephalale	At-grade intersection; Southern end of concurrency with R561
Mogalakwena	Lekhureng	0	0	—	R567, Tibane, Polokwane	At-grade intersection
Mogalakwena	Mahwelereng	0	0	—	R518 west, Lephalale	At-grade intersection; Northern end of concurrency with R518
Mogalakwena	Mokopane	0	0	—	R101 Thabo Mbeki Drive north, Polokwane	At-grade intersection; Northern end of concurrency with R101
Mogalakwena	Mokopane	0	0	—	R518 Van Riebeeck Street east, Zebediela	At-grade intersection; Southern end of concurrency with R518
Mogalakwena	Mokopane	0	0	—	R101 south, Mookgophong	At-grade intersection; Southern end of concurrency with R101
Mogalakwena	Mokopane	0	0	(334)	N1 south, Pretoria	Tolled entrance to N1; No access to N1 north
Modimolle–Mookgophong	Roedtan	0	0	—	R519 west, Mookgophong	At-grade intersection; Northern end of concurrency with R519
Modimolle–Mookgophong	Roedtan	0	0	—	R519 east, Zebediela	At-grade intersection; Southern end of concurrency with R519
Modimolle–Mookgophong	Roedtan	0	0	—	R33 west, Modimolle	At-grade intersection; Northern end of concurrency with R33
Ephraim Mogale	Marble Hall	0	0	—	R573, Siyabuswa	At-grade intersection; Future traffic circle
Elias Motsoaledi	Groblersdal	0	0	—	R25 Van Riebeeck Street, Bronkhorstspruit	At-grade intersection
Elias Motsoaledi	Groblersdal	0	0	—	R33 Van Riebeeck Street east, Belfast	At-grade intersection; Southern end of concurrency with R33
N11 continues into Mpumalanga

=== Mpumalanga ===
Municipality	Location	km	mi	Exit	Destinations	Notes
Steve Tshwete	Middelburg	0	0	—	R555 Walter Sisulu Street south, Witbank	At-grade intersection; Western end of concurrency with R555
Steve Tshwete	Middelburg	0	0	—	R35 Samora Machel Street south, Bethal	At-grade intersection
Steve Tshwete	Middelburg	0	0	—	R555 Meyer Street north, Burgersfort	At-grade intersection; Eastern end of concurrency with R555
Steve Tshwete	Middelburg	0	0	—	R104, Belfast	At-grade intersection
Steve Tshwete	Middelburg	0	0	(133)	N4, Witbank, Mbombela	
Steve Tshwete	Hendrina	0	0	—	R38 Beukes Street, Carolina, Bethal	At-grade intersection
Msukaligwa	Breyten	0	0	—	R542, Breyten	At-grade intersection
Msukaligwa	Ermelo	0	0	—	N17 Fourie Street east, Chrissiesmeer	At-grade intersection; Northern end of concurrency with N17
Msukaligwa	Ermelo	0	0	—	N17 Joubert Street west, Bethal	At-grade intersection; Southern end of concurrency with N17
Msukaligwa	Ermelo	0	0	—	N2 Voortrekker Avenue, Piet Retief	At-grade intersection
Pixley ka Seme	Amersfoort	0	0	—	R35 Sybrand van Niekerk Street, Moregenzon	At-grade intersection
Pixley ka Seme	Volksrust	0	0	—	R543 Chris Hani Street east, Wakkerstroom	At-grade intersection; Northern end of concurrency with R543
Pixley ka Seme	Volksrust	0	0	—	R543 Adelaide Tambo Street west, R23, Vrede, Standerton	At-grade intersection; Southern end of concurrency with R543
N11 continues into KwaZulu-Natal

=== KwaZulu-Natal ===
Municipality	Location	km	mi	Exit	Destinations	Notes
Newcastle	Newcastle	0	0	—	R34 east, Utrecht	At-grade intersection; Northern end of concurrency with R34
Newcastle	Newcastle	0	0	—	R34 Allen Street west, Newcastle	Southern end of concurrency with R34
Dannhauser	Durnacol	0	0	—	R68, Dundee	At-grade intersection
Alfred Duma	Elandslaagte	0	0	—	R602, Wasbank, Dundee	At-grade intersection
Alfred Duma	Ladysmith	0	0	—	R103 north, Van Reenen	Northern end of concurrency with R103
Alfred Duma	Ladysmith	0	0	—	R103 south, Colenso	At-grade intersection; Southern end of concurrency with R103
Alfred Duma	Ladysmith	0	0	—	R600, Winterton	At-grade intersection
Okhalamba	Bergville	0	0	(230)	N3, Durban, Johannesburg, R616, Bergville	Tolled southbound entrance onto N3
N11 ends
