= Rooiboklaagte =

Town in Mpumalanga, South Africa

- Location within Mpumalanga Location within South Africa
- Coordinates: 24.655°S 31.067°E
- Country: South Africa
- Province: Mpumalanga
- District: Ehlanzeni
- Municipality: Bushbuckridge

Area
  - Total: 3.62 km^{2} (1.40 sq mi)

Population (2011)
  - Total: 3,650
  - Density: 1,010/km^{2} (2,610/sq mi)

Racial makeup (2011)
  - Black African: 99.6%
  - Coloured: 0.1%
  - White: 0.2%

First languages (2011)
  - Tsonga: 62.4%
  - Sotho: 21.0%
  - Northern Sotho: 13.2%
  - Swazi: 1.1%
  - Other: 2.3%
- Time zone: UTC+2 (SAST)
- Postal code (street): 1375
- PO box: 1375

Rooiboklaagte is a town in Ehlanzeni District Municipality in the Mpumalanga province of South Africa.
