= R614 (South Africa) =

Regional route in South Africa

Regional route R614

Location
- Country: South Africa

Highway system
- Numbered routes of South Africa
← R612	→ R616

The R614 is a Regional Route in South Africa.

== Route ==
Its western terminus is the R33 just south of Albert Falls. It runs east, through Wartburg along the northern edge of the Valley of a Thousand Hills. The route ends at the R102 at Tongaat. It is an alternative route to the N3 for travel between the North Coast and Pietermaritzburg.
