= Orrie Baragwanath Pass =

Coordinates: 24°08′48″S 30°12′01″E

Orrie Baragwanath Pass is situated in the Limpopo Province on the road between Ofcolaco and Lebowakgomo (South Africa). Part of the road is numbered as the R37. The pass has a steep paved ascent from the east up the slopes of the far northern Drakensberg mountains to a height of 1370 m above sea level. From the west there is an equally steep but unpaved ascent with a fairly flat unpaved section of approximately 10 kilometers along the summit between the two approaches. Although most of the pass is located in Lekgalameetse Provincial Park, it is nevertheless a public road with free access. An access fee is payable if entering the pass from the Lekgalameetse entrance gate.
