= Groblersbrug =

Groblersbrug (known as Grobler's Bridge in English) is a border crossing between South Africa and Botswana on the Limpopo River in Limpopo. On the Botswana side, the border post is known as Martin's Drift.

	South Africa	Botswana
Name	Groblersbrug	Martin's Drift
Region	Limpopo	Central
Road	N11	B140
GPS Coordinates	22°59′55.36″S 27°56′37.5″E	22°59′47″S 27°56′19″E
Telephone number	+27 (0) 14 767 1019	+267 494 0254 +267 491 5913
Fax number	+27 (0) 14 767 1264	+267 491 5905
Business hours	08:00 - 22:00	08:00 - 22:00
