= White River, Mpumalanga =

White River
- White River
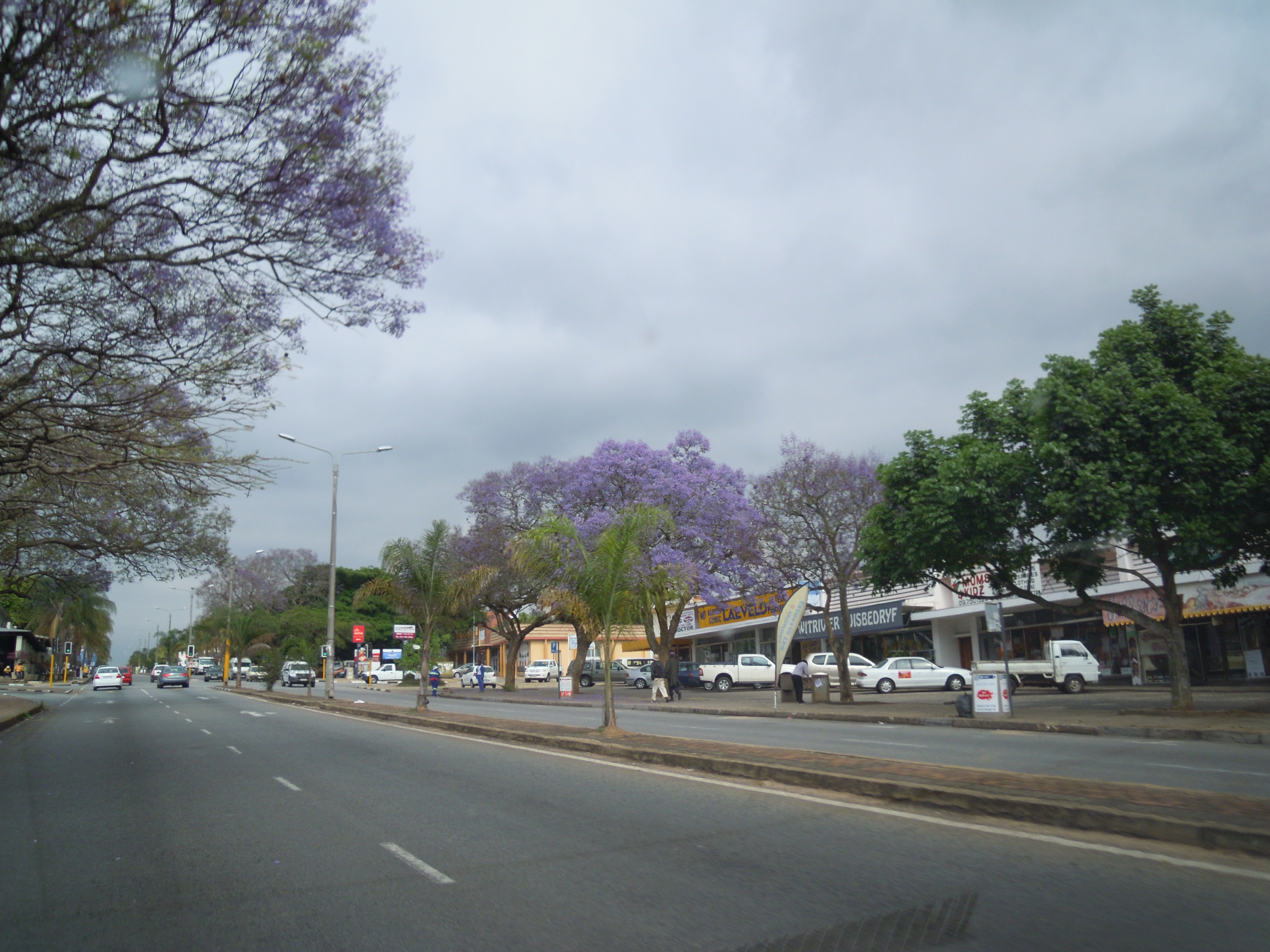
- A street in White River

- Location within Mpumalanga Location within South Africa
- Coordinates: 25°19′S 31°01′E
- Country: South Africa
- Province: Mpumalanga
- Councillor: Rowan Torr (7 August 2019–present)
- Municipality: Mbombela

Area
  - Total: 60.55 km^{2} (23.38 sq mi)

Population (2011)
  - Total: 16,639
  - Density: 274.8/km^{2} (711.7/sq mi)

Racial makeup (2011)
  - White: 60.3%
  - Black African: 32.5%
  - Coloured: 4.3%
  - Indian/Asian: 2.5%
  - Other: 0.4%

First languages (2011)
  - Afrikaans: 42.2%
  - English: 28.7%
  - Swazi: 16.1%
  - Tsonga: 3.0%
  - Other: 10.0%
- Time zone: UTC+2 (SAST)
- Postal code (street): 1240
- PO box: 1240

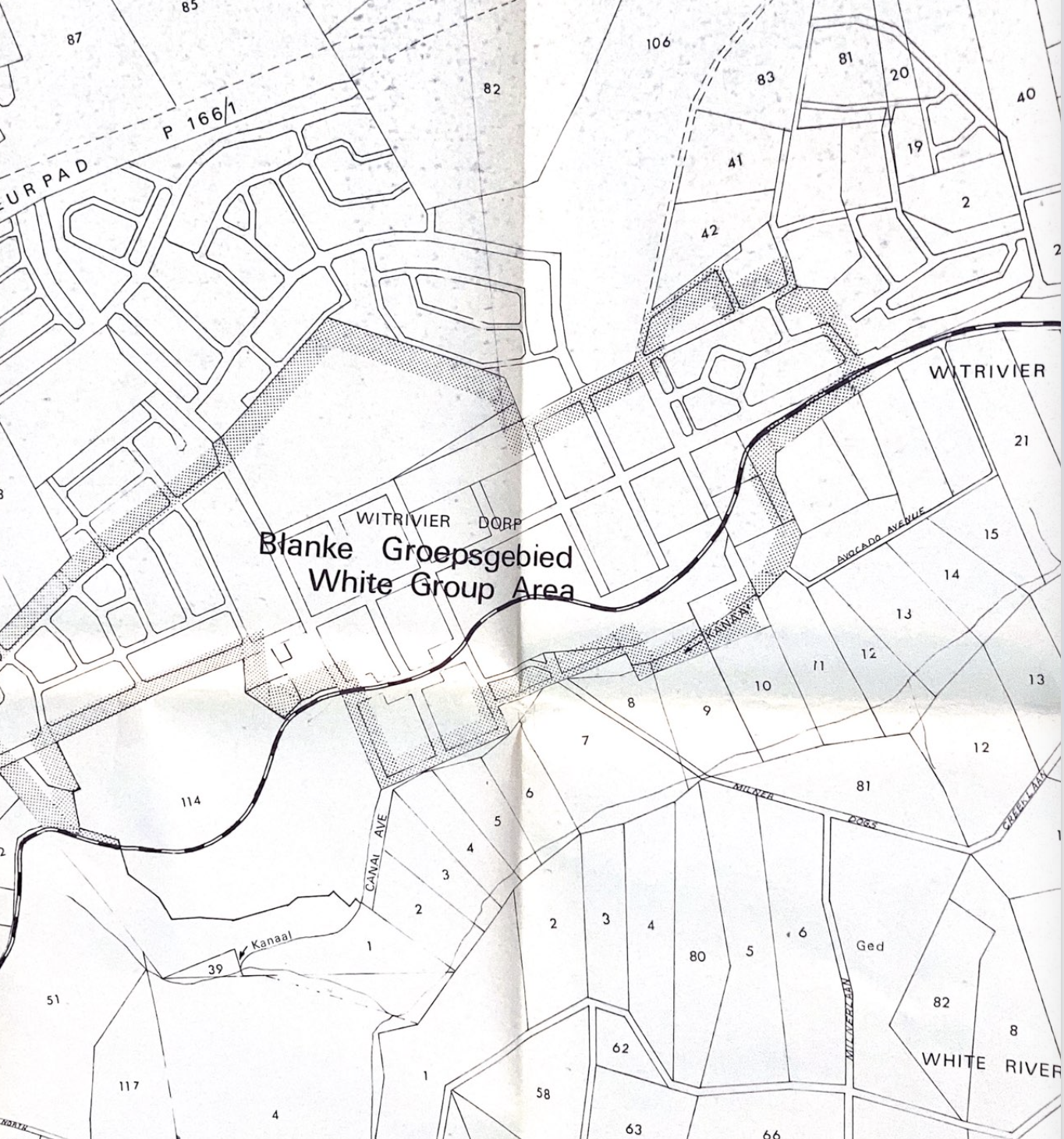
White River Group Areas Map 1978

White River (Afrikaans: Witrivier) is a small farming town situated just north of Mbombela in Mpumalanga, South Africa. The farms in the region produce tropical fruits, macadamia nuts, vegetables, flowers and timber. As of 2011, White River had a population of 16,639.

== History ==
=== Early history ===
Archaeological evidence from surrounding areas suggests that people have lived on the land that later became White River for thousands of years. Remains of settlements from the 6th-century BC point to Iron Age African agricultural and livestock-keeping societies that lived in the area. The Plaston site, east of White River, shows evidence of communities in the area from circa 620 CE. Numerous Khoe-San rock painting sites nearby are indicative of even longer human settlement. By the early 19th century, the area was inhabited by Eastern Sotho (MaPulana, Kutswe and Pai) societies and later Swazi chieftaincies. What was known as the Emanzimhlope River, a tributary of the Crocodile River flowed through the region. Emanzimhlope translates to 'White Waters' in siSwati.

=== Colonial Era ===
Malaria and animal trypanosomiasis pervasive in the lowveld in the 19th century meant that white settlers initially avoided year-round settlement in the White River area. Boer traders, hunters and farmers from settlements in the highveld only came down to the area in the winter. The first year round settlement in the White River area was an isolated farm only in 1873 by Bill Sanderson, a Scottish gold prospector, hunter, and trader. Only after the 1890s African rinderpest epizootic, which wiped out trypanosomiasis, did white settlers begin to settle in the White River area. By claiming the most agriculturally productive and wettest areas with the best climates as their own, white settlers dispossessed Africans of land that they had lived on for generations.

In 1905, after the South African War, Lord Alfred Milner (British administrator of the Transvaal) demarcated land along the Emanzimhlope river for settlement by British settlers, mainly demobilised British Anglo-Boer War soldiers. Milner tasked soldier Tom Lawrence to allocate land to the settlers. Lawrence became the first manager of the new settlement, with the longest street in the town still named after him. Initially, the colonial administration provided settlers with farming equipment and a weekly salary until they began to make an income from their tobacco, citrus, maize and other vegetable crops. Farmers were heavily subsidized until 1907 and the building of a 25 kilometer long irrigation canal improved prospects for some. However, the scheme largely failed and many settlers gave up farming when their contracts ended. In 1911, the Union government sold the farms at White River for a significant loss to a syndicate that planted scale citrus farms on the land. After WWI, the settlement scheme expanded as the land was sold at discounted rates to demobilised white soldiers.

In 1923, a tiny plot of land on the edge of White River was designated as a "location" for black wage workers and their families. The rest of White River was reserved for white settlers. In the mid 1960s, the Lowvelder newspaper reported that while the white residential areas of White River expanded significantly in the following decades, the black location remained confined to just 15 hectares, although the population of the community had expanded to over 3000 people.

=== Apartheid Era ===
Under the Apartheid era Group Areas Act, White River was designated a white area. The aparthied state and white farmers forcibly resettled thousands of black people living in White River and as labour tenants on surrounding farms were to African reserves and towns like Bushbuckridge, Pienaar and Kabokweni. These removals accelerated, especially under policies of separate development in the 1960s and 1970s. In 1968, the Bantu Affairs Department forcibly removed 3000 people from the White River location to a newly established township at Ngodini. Many people in these resettled township communities commuted daily between what became the bantustan of KaNgwane to White River and other towns like Nelspruit segregated as white.

White River was the base for the Whiteriver Commando, an infantry regiment of the South African Army.

== Region ==
White River lies 20 km north of Mbombela, and 46 km south of Hazyview, not far from the border with Kruger National Park. It is 15 km west-north-west of the Kruger Mpumalanga International Airport. The town includes a residential, commercial, and industrial areas while agricultural holdings are on the outskirts of the town. The town features a library, municipal buildings, car dealerships, filling stations, lodges and hotels, churches, a mosque, a police station, and retail centers. It is a popular holiday destination for those looking to visit the Crocodile River Valley, Panorama and Lowveld Legogote Tourism Routes and the Kruger National Park. The town itself has a reputation for its arts and crafts. The Casterbridge Lifestyle Centre situated on the outskirts of the city is a popular tourist stop. Once a mango plantation, the centre now has a cinema, a vintage motor museum and restaurants and hosts art exhibitions, plays and concerts.

== Government ==
White River is in the Mbombela A Municipal Zone, falling under Ward 30 and is governed by the Democratic Alliance (DA), South Africa's official opposition party.

== Agriculture ==
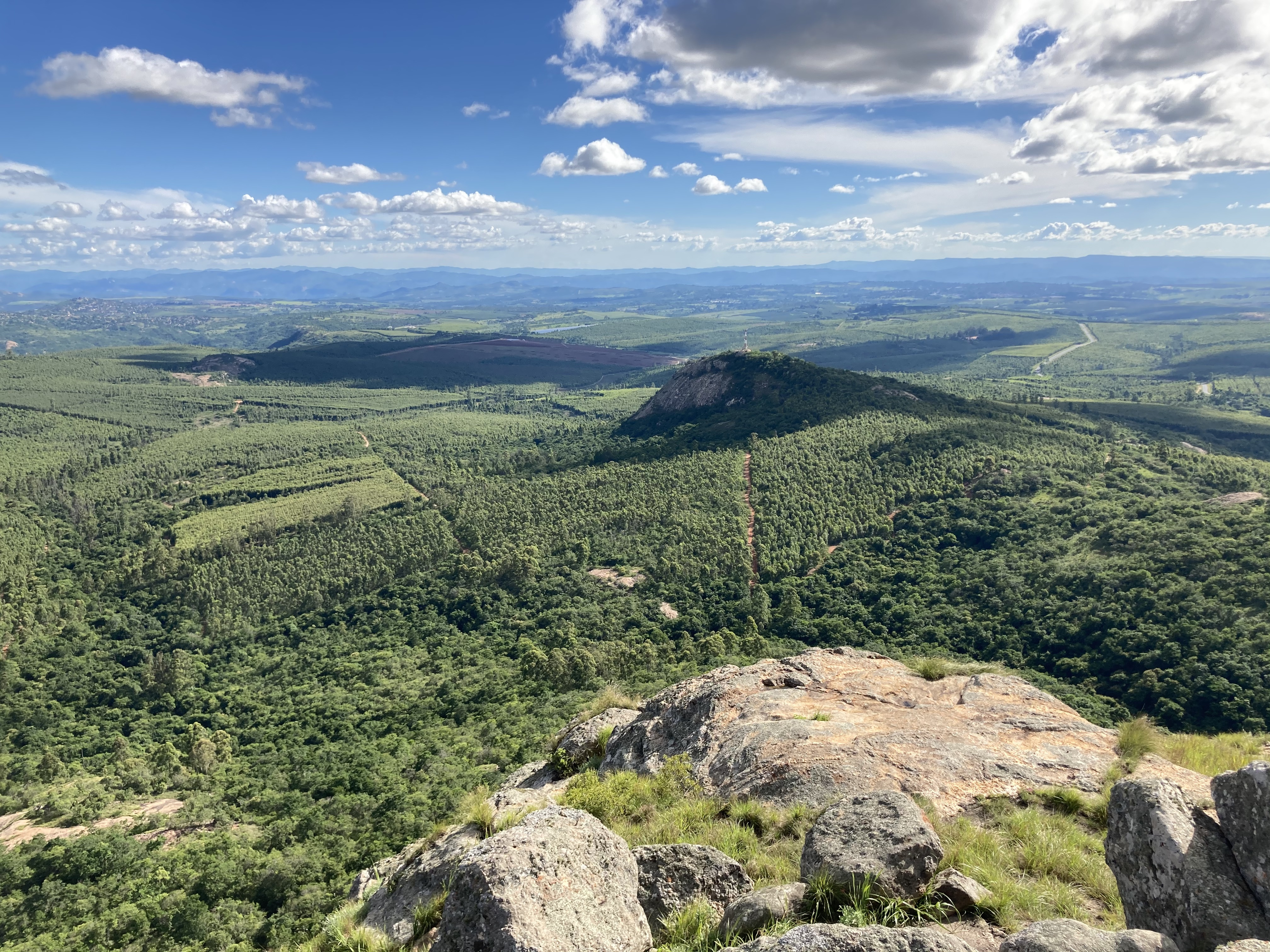
A view from Legogote Mountain of timber plantations, farms and indigenous bush surrounding White River

The White River area is one of the most fertile in the province and farming continues to be a central part of the local economy. After a 26 km canal to channel water from the river was built, new farmers planted fruit trees and established new cultivation methods. Today, agriculture involves largely the production of tropical fruits, macadamia nuts, vegetables, flowers and timber. The farms tend to be relatively small and the agriculture is intensive. Farms are irrigated by nearby dams such as Longmere, Witklip and Klipkoppie.

== Education ==
- Acek Academy
- Flamboyant School
- Hoërskool Rob Ferreira High School
- Laerskool White River Primary School
- Metropolitan College
- Uplands Preparatory and College
- The King’s School

== Climate ==
White River is located in the low altitude subtropical Lowveld climatic zone. Savannah and woodland scattered with granite outcrops form the indigenous habitat. Compared to other parts of South Africa, the climate is mild with good rainfall. Nevertheless, like the rest of South Africa, White River and its surrounding farms are being adversely impacted by climate change. The area is especially prone to frost, veld fires and droughts that pose food production threats and economic risks to farmers.

Climate Data
Climate Data for Mbombela
Month	Jan	Feb	Mar	Apr	May	Jun	Jul	Aug	Sep	Oct	Nov	Dec
Average high °C (°F)	27.5 (81.5)	27.4 (81.3)	26.5 (79.7)	25.2 (77.4)	23.4 (74.1)	21.7 (71.1)	21.1 (70.0)	23.1 (73.6)	24.7 (76.5)	26.1 (79.0)	26.3 (79.3)	27.0 (80.6)
Average low °C (°F)	17.0 (62.6)	16.9 (62.4)	15.8 (60.4)	13.6 (56.5)	9.6 (49.3)	7.1 (44.8)	6.6 (43.9)	8.6 (47.5)	11.0 (51.8)	13.7 (56.7)	15.2 (59.4)	16.4 (61.5)
Average precipitation mm (inches)	171 (6.7)	156 (6.1)	124 (4.9)	57 (2.2)	24 (0.9)	13 (0.5)	15 (0.6)	14 (0.5)	37 (1.5)	77 (3.0)	130 (5.12)	150 (5.9)

== Housing and Land ==
In 2003, 6 000 hectares of land on the outskirts of White River and surrounding areas were redistributed to the Matsafeni trust when the state purchased the land from Hall & Sons for R63 million under the South African national land reform program. As of 2016, Mbombela, the municipality that White River falls under, had a housing backlog of 34 000 units, impacting low income families especially hard. The persistence of Apartheid-era spatial planning means that land close to the town is expensive and privately owned. This, combined with the economic opportunities and employment, mainly in White River and Mbombela mean that informal settlements around Rocky Drift (Msholozi and Phumlani) and other nearby areas have been established in recent years.

=== Districts ===
- Parkville
- Msholozi
- Kingsview
- Colts Hill
- Yaverland

== Media ==
The town's local newspaper, the White River Post was established in 2006 and has a distribution of 5000 copies every two weeks. Larger local papers, such as the Lowvelder and Mpumalanga News also cover news in White River.

== Gallery ==
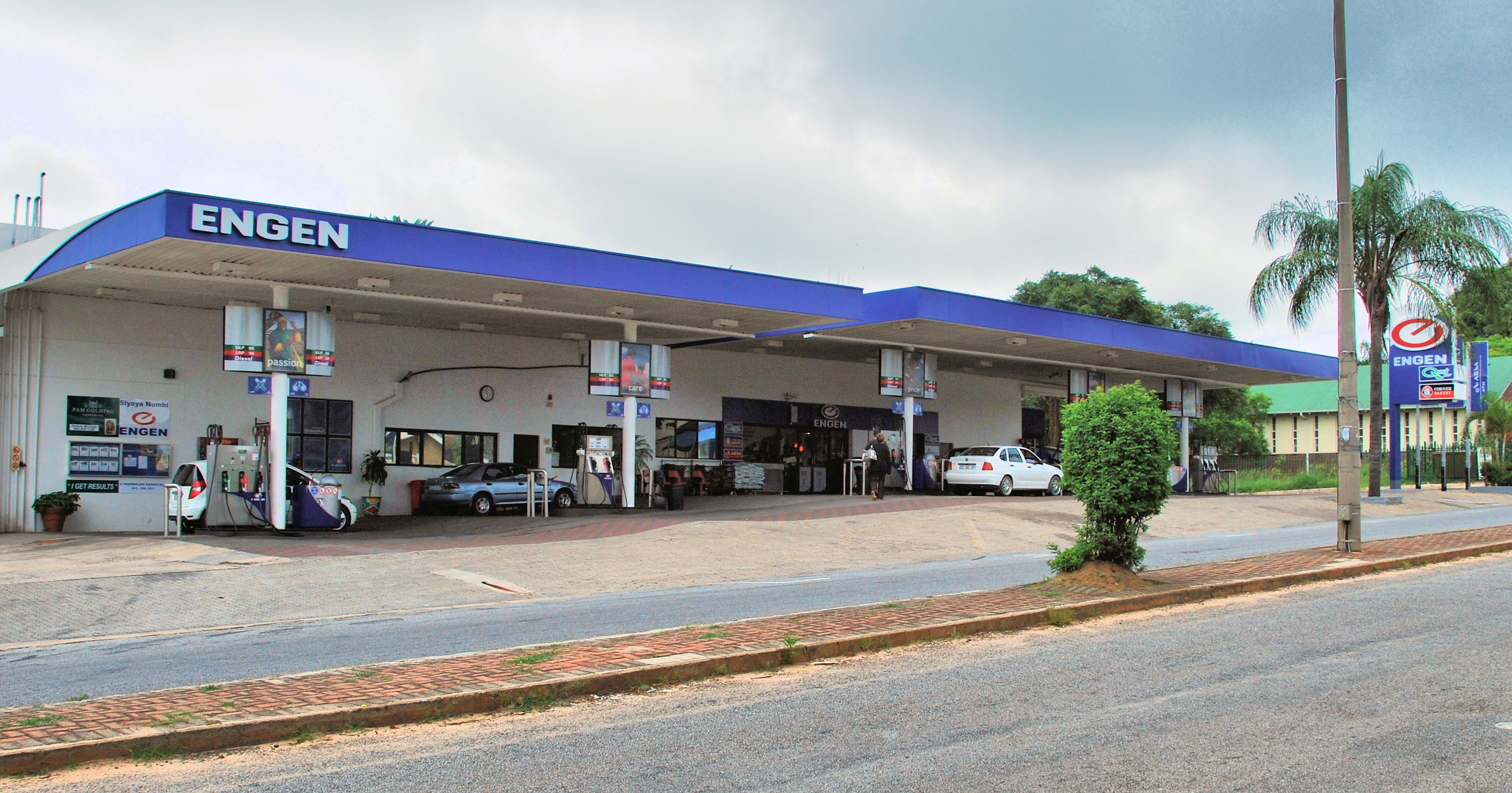
Petrol Station in White River

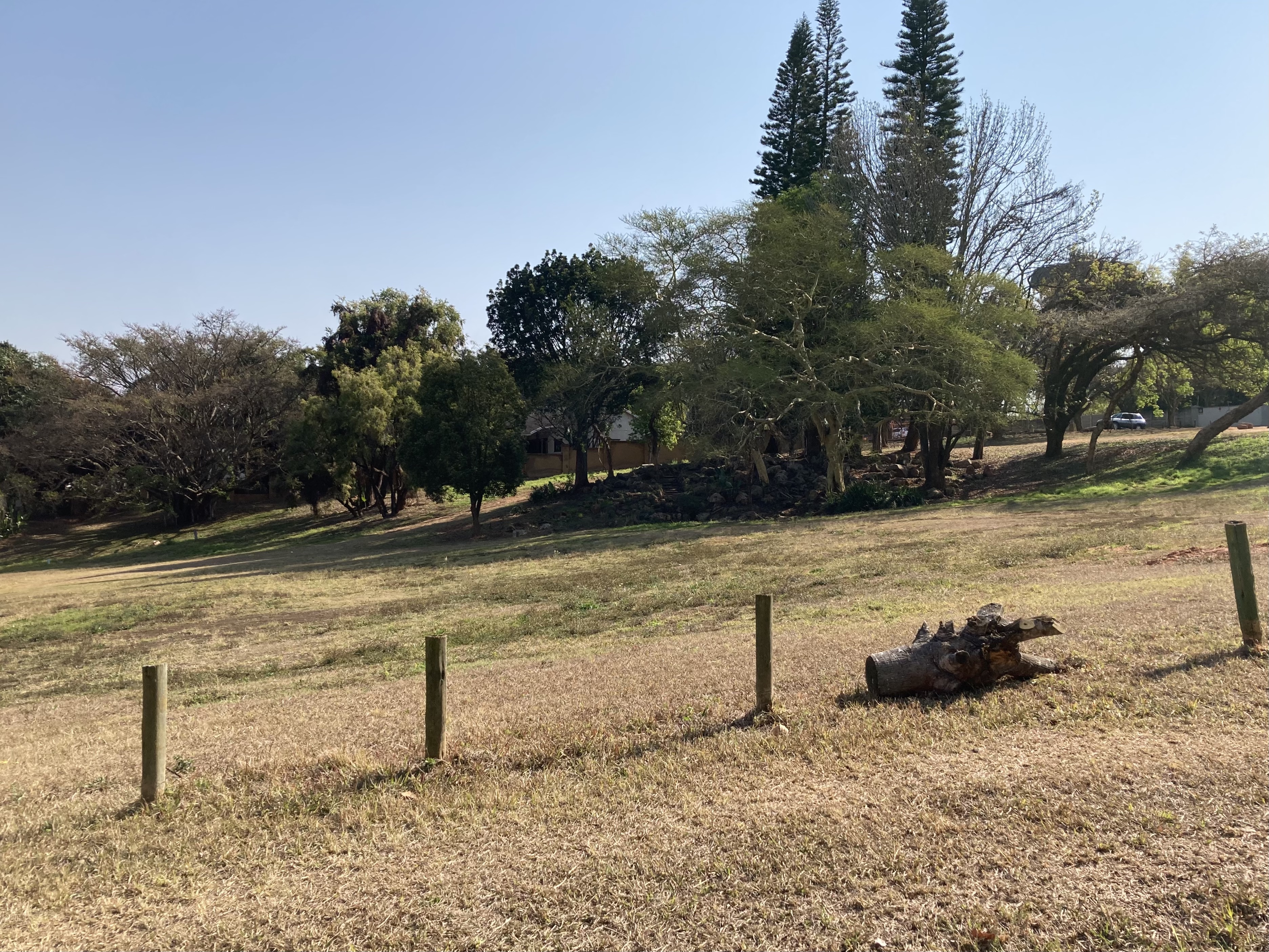
Ronnie Bester Park in White River

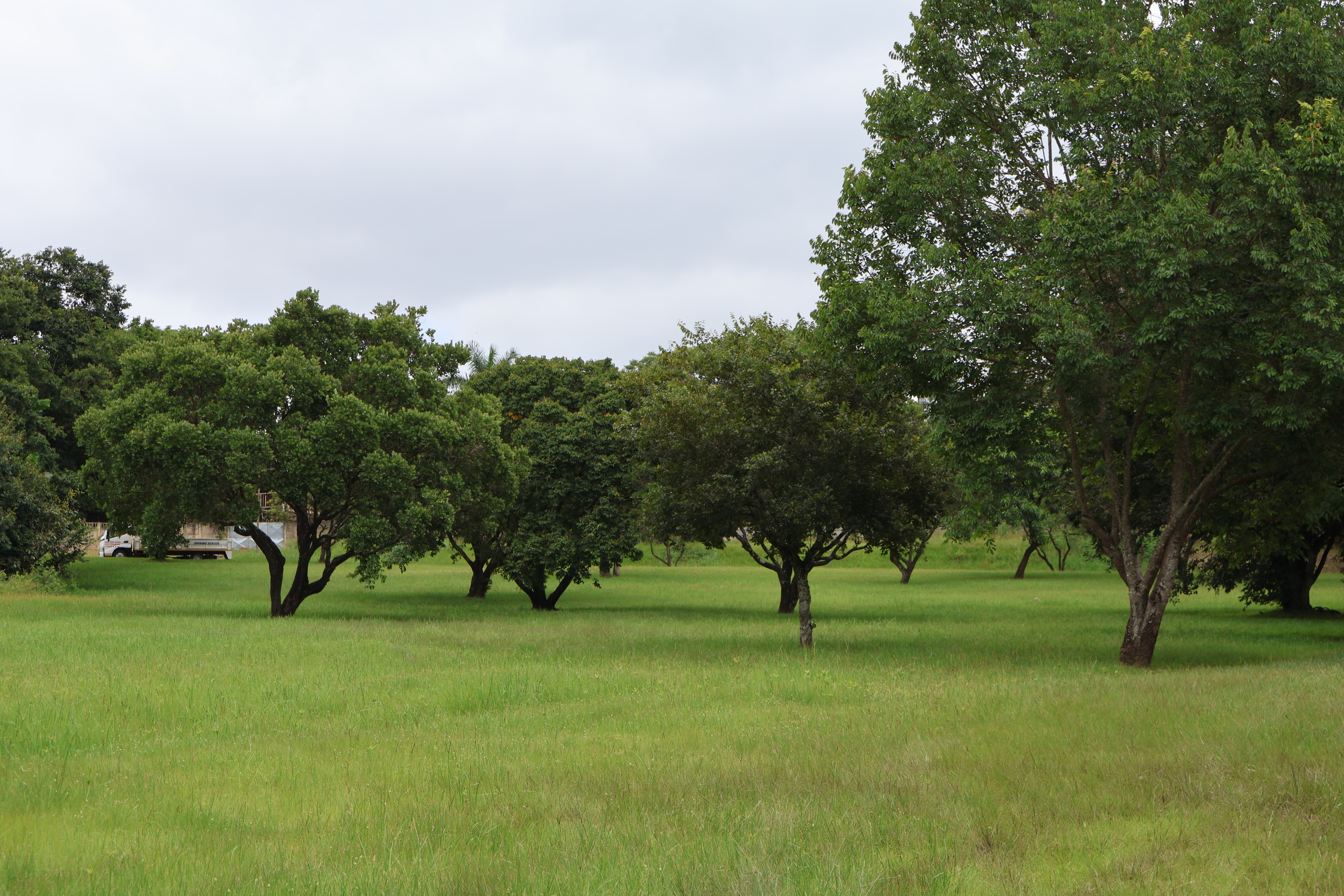
Trees in the White River Nature Reserve

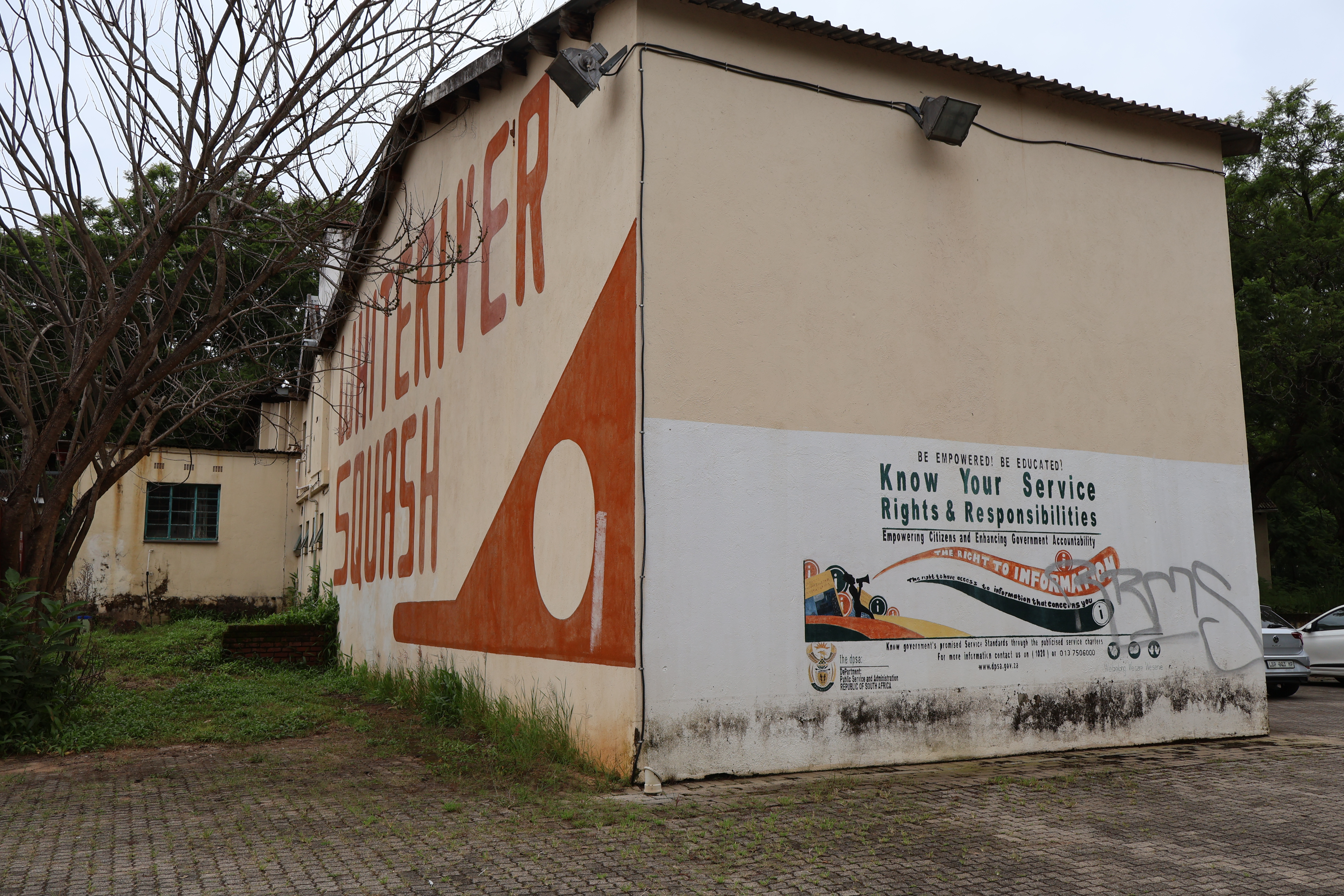
Municipal sports facilities in White River

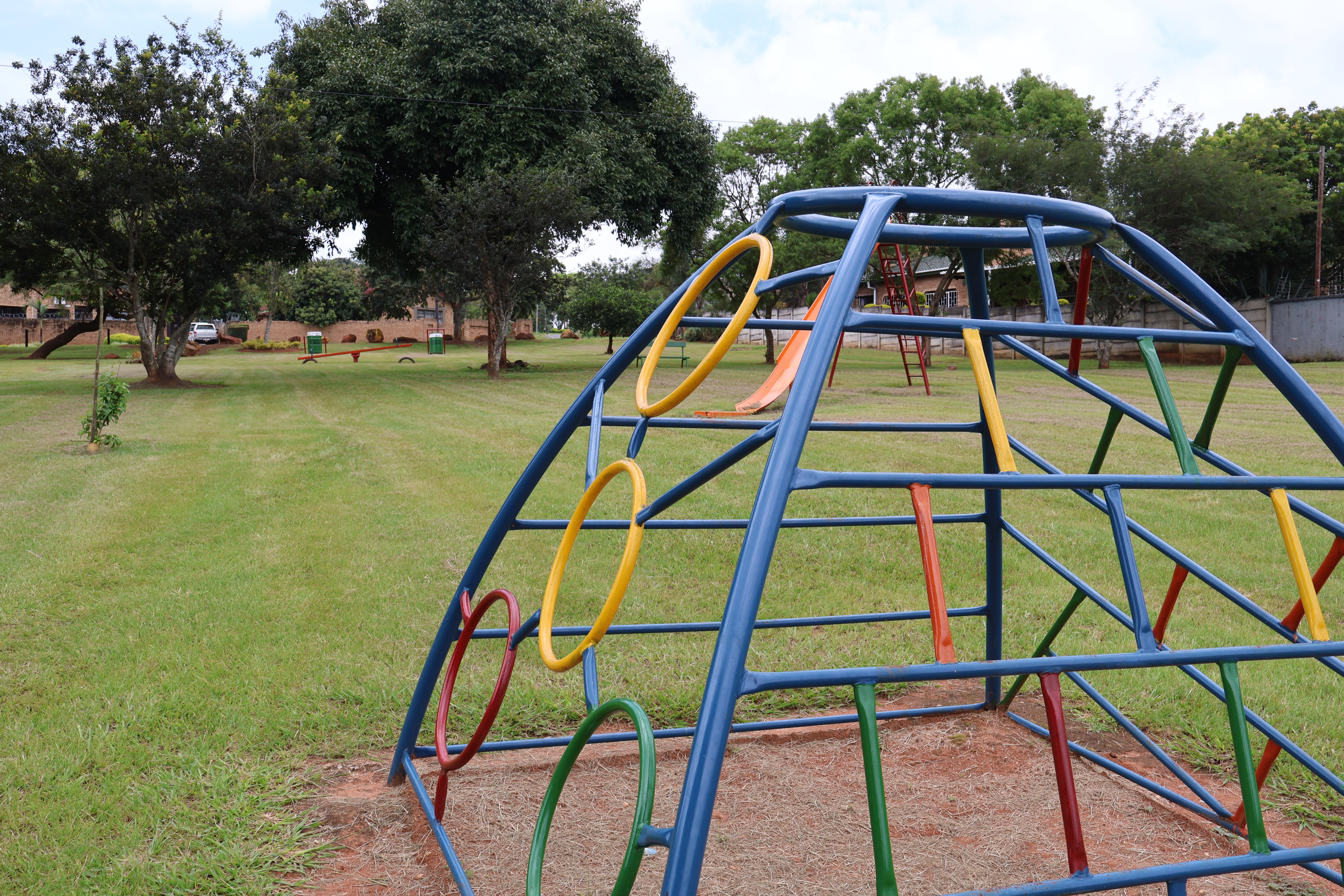
Playground in a park in White River

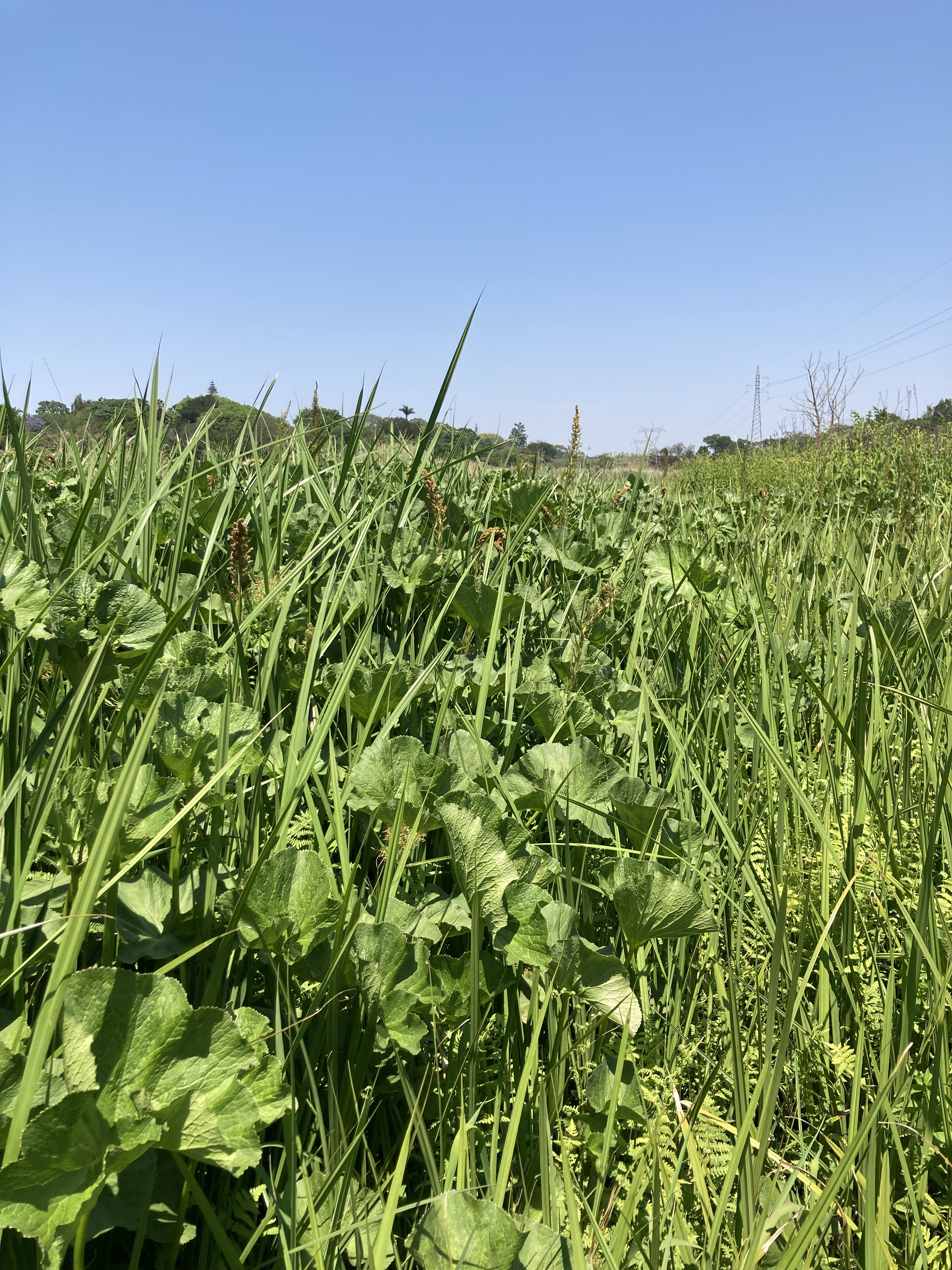
In March 1994, a piece of land in White River became a nature reserve. This is the wetland in the reserve. It provides important habitat for local biodiversity.

== Botany ==
The wider area surrounding White River has many endemic plant species. These include:

- Kalanchoe alticola
- Brachystelma bruceae
- Aloe barbertoniae
- Sterculia murex
- Drimiopsis gracilis
- Syncolostemon persimilis
- Berkheya nivea
- Streptocarpus pole-evansii
- Drimiopsis attwoodii
- Aloe petricola
- Streptocarpus dunnii
- Euphorbia vandermerwei
- Aloe simii
- Syncolostemon muddii
