= Vivo, South Africa =

Vivo
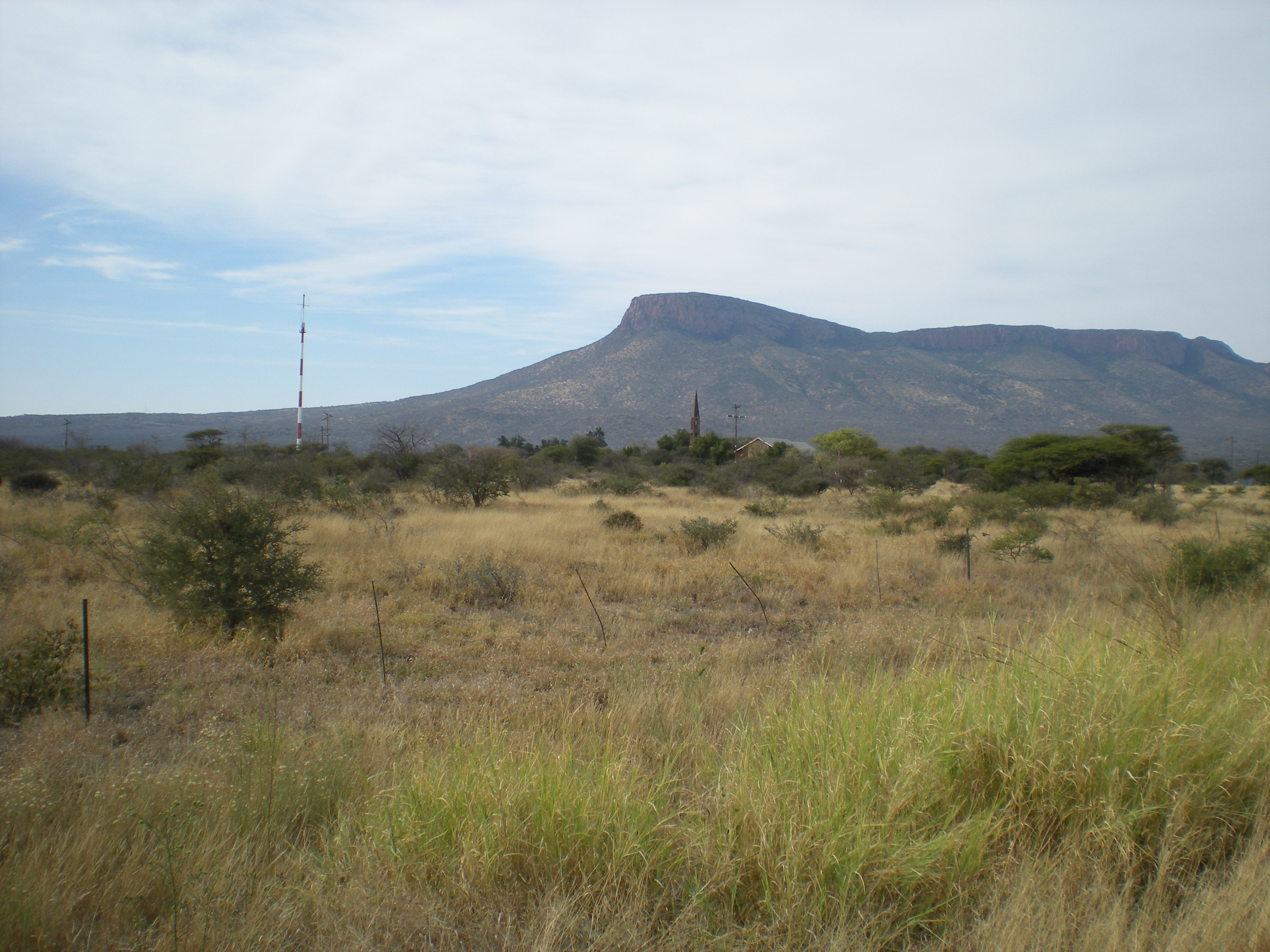
- Vivo, close to the centre of the town, with the Soutpansberg in the background

- Location within Limpopo Location within South Africa
- Coordinates: 23.043°S 29.277°E
- Country: South Africa
- Province: Limpopo
- District: Capricorn
- Municipality: Blouberg

Population
  - Total: 308
- Time zone: UTC+2 (SAST)
- Postal code (street): 0924
- PO box: 0924
- Area code: 015

Vivo is a small farming town in the Blouberg Local Municipality of the Capricorn District Municipality in the northern part of Limpopo province, South Africa.

The town lies south of the Brak River, in a gap between the Soutpansberg and the Blouberg Range, some 72 km west of Louis Trichardt. The name is thought to be derived from Sepedi phefo, ‘cold wind’, though it has been stated that the hills resemble the spelling of ‘Vivo’ when seen from a certain angle. The towns located closest to Vivo are Alldays and Makhado. The main economic activities in the area are mining, farming and conservation. The town once had a boarding school that hosted local farm children as well as various others from bigger cities as far as Johannesburg. Known as a military-type institution with very poor conditions for students, the school closed in the mid-1990s. The school with full primary school and secondary school facilities with a hostel reopened and is fully functional. The town has a post office, a filling station and a small convenience store. For larger purchases residents would have to travel to one of the neighbouring towns.
