= Lowveld National Botanical Garden =

Botanical garden near Mbombela in Mpumalanga, South Africa

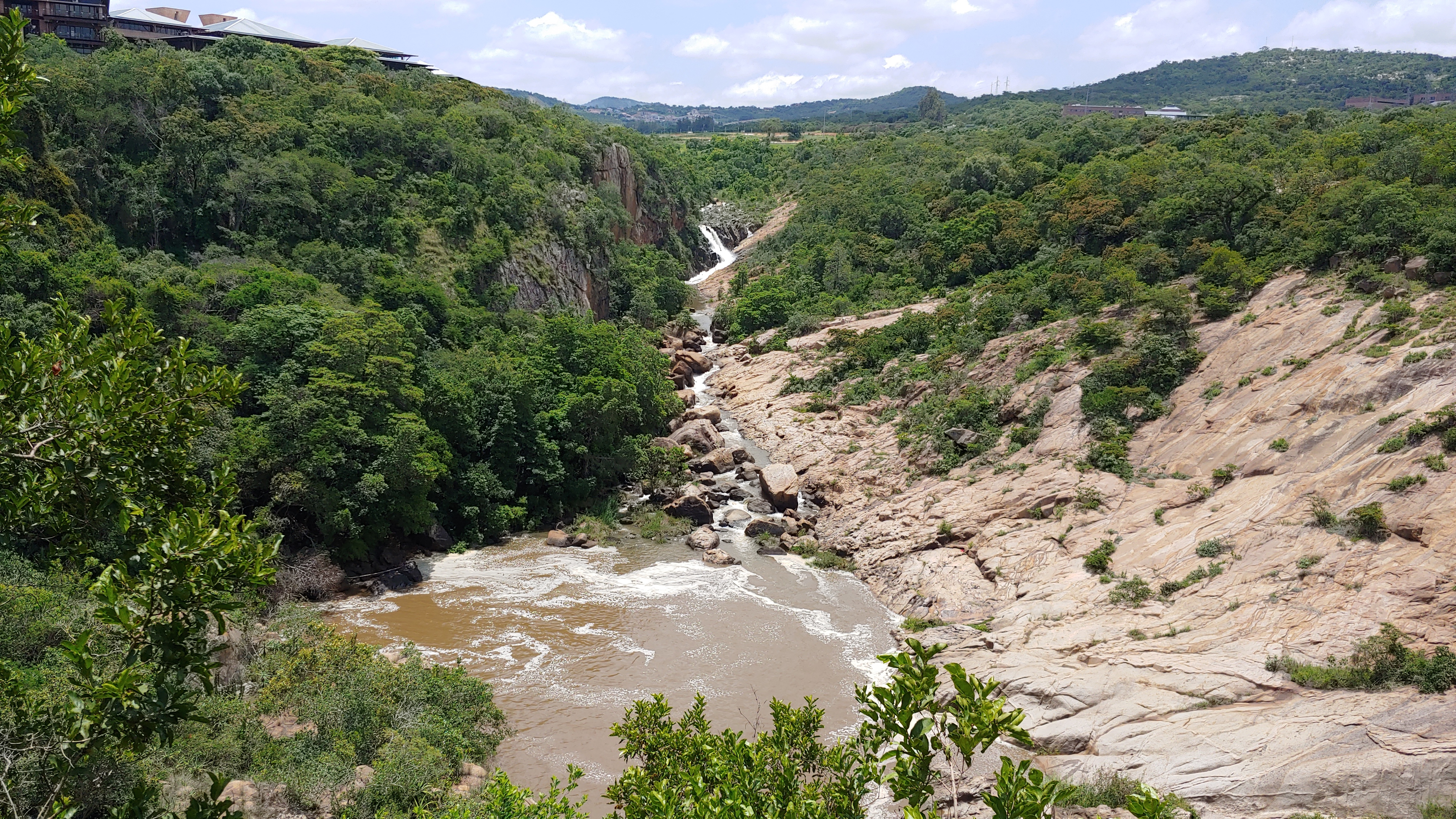
- Interactive map of Lowveld National Botanical Garden
- Type: Botanical garden
- Location: Mbombela
- Coordinates: 25°26′40″S 30°57′58″E
- Area: 165 hectares (410 acres)
- Website: sanbi.org/gardens/lowveld/

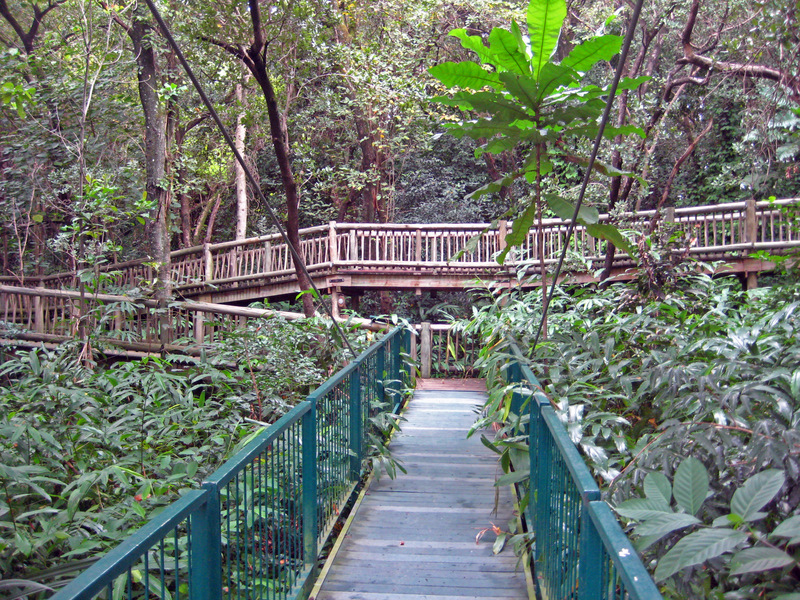
Walkways in the artificial forest, consisting of indigenous and introduced African plants

The Lowveld National Botanical Garden, one of the nine National Botanical Gardens of South Africa is located just outside Mbombela, Mpumalanga at the confluence of the Crocodile River and Nels River, which are separated by an extensive promontory. A lookout point at the far end of the garden, reached through a rainforest trail (surrounded by clivias, fig trees, and baobab) allows views of the river in the deep gorge.

600 native and 2,000 imported plant species grow in the garden. Almost 650 native tree species are found there as well. The largest collection of cycads in the country is found in Lowveld, as well as a gene bank for such plants.

The garden is 165 ha in size, with only 30 ha landscaped while the rest remains natural with low, or no maintenance.

The Botanical Garden was established in 1969 and officially opened on 10 September 1971. It was created on land made available by the Nelspruit Town Council and HL Hall and Sons, a large landowning and farming enterprise in the area.

The N4 road runs through the northern portion of the park.

The garden has hippos that live in the rivers running through it.

== Amenities ==
The garden includes a medicinal garden, children's play area, Braille garden, indigenous tree nursery and environmental education centre.

There is a restaurant near Entrance 1 of the garden and a tea garden closer to Entrance 2.

== Gallery ==
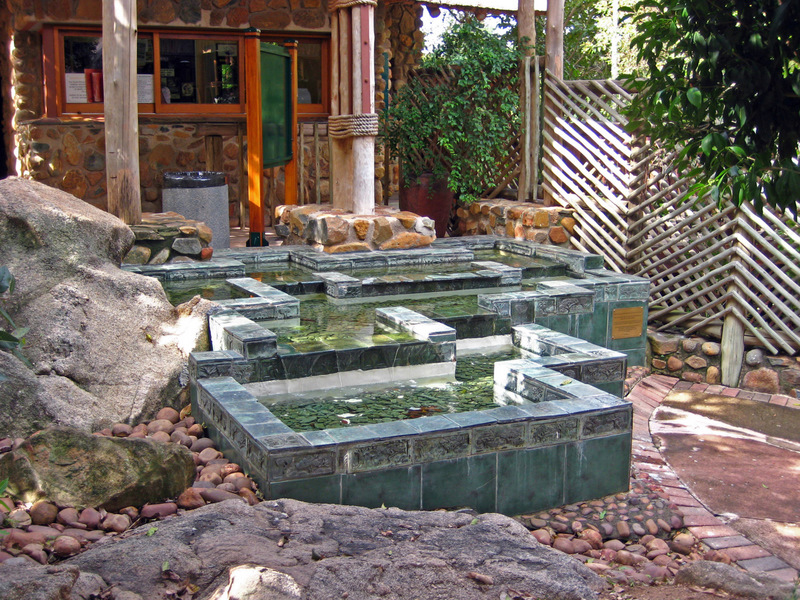
Water feature at the entrance

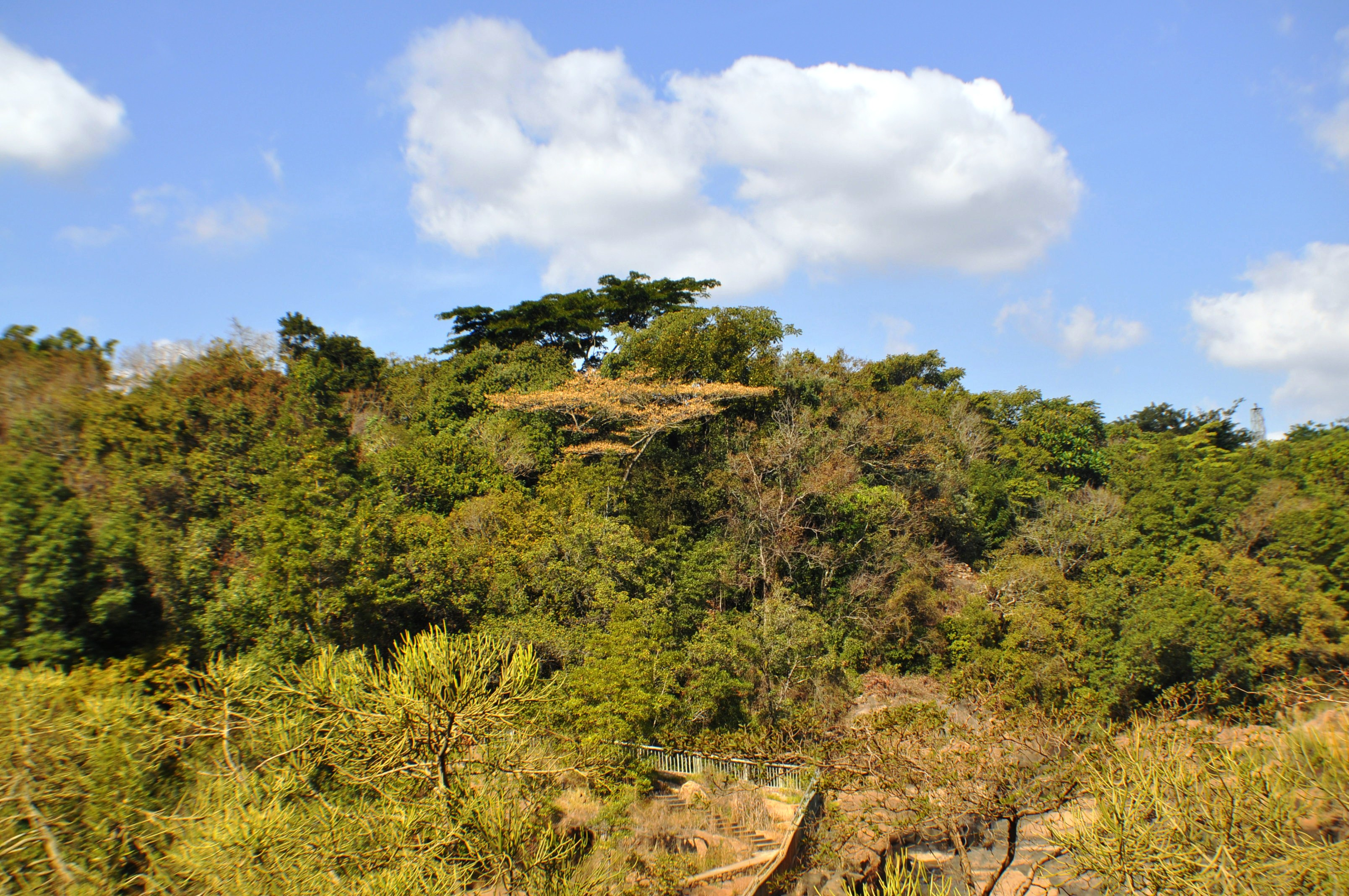
Riparian vegetation flanking the Crocodile River. A pedestrian and road bridge links the two sections.

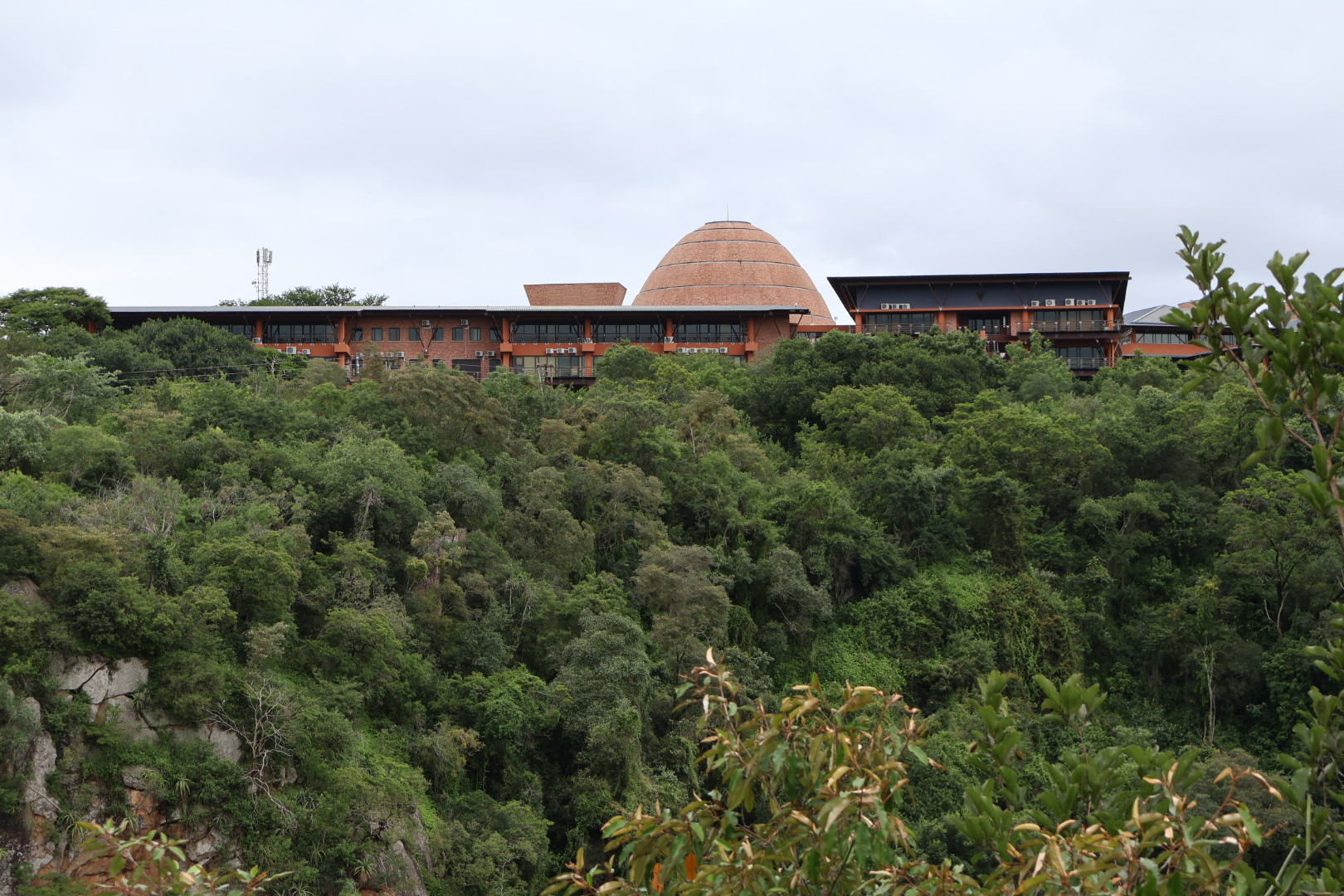
The Mpumalanga Provincial Legislature can be seen from the Botanical Gardens

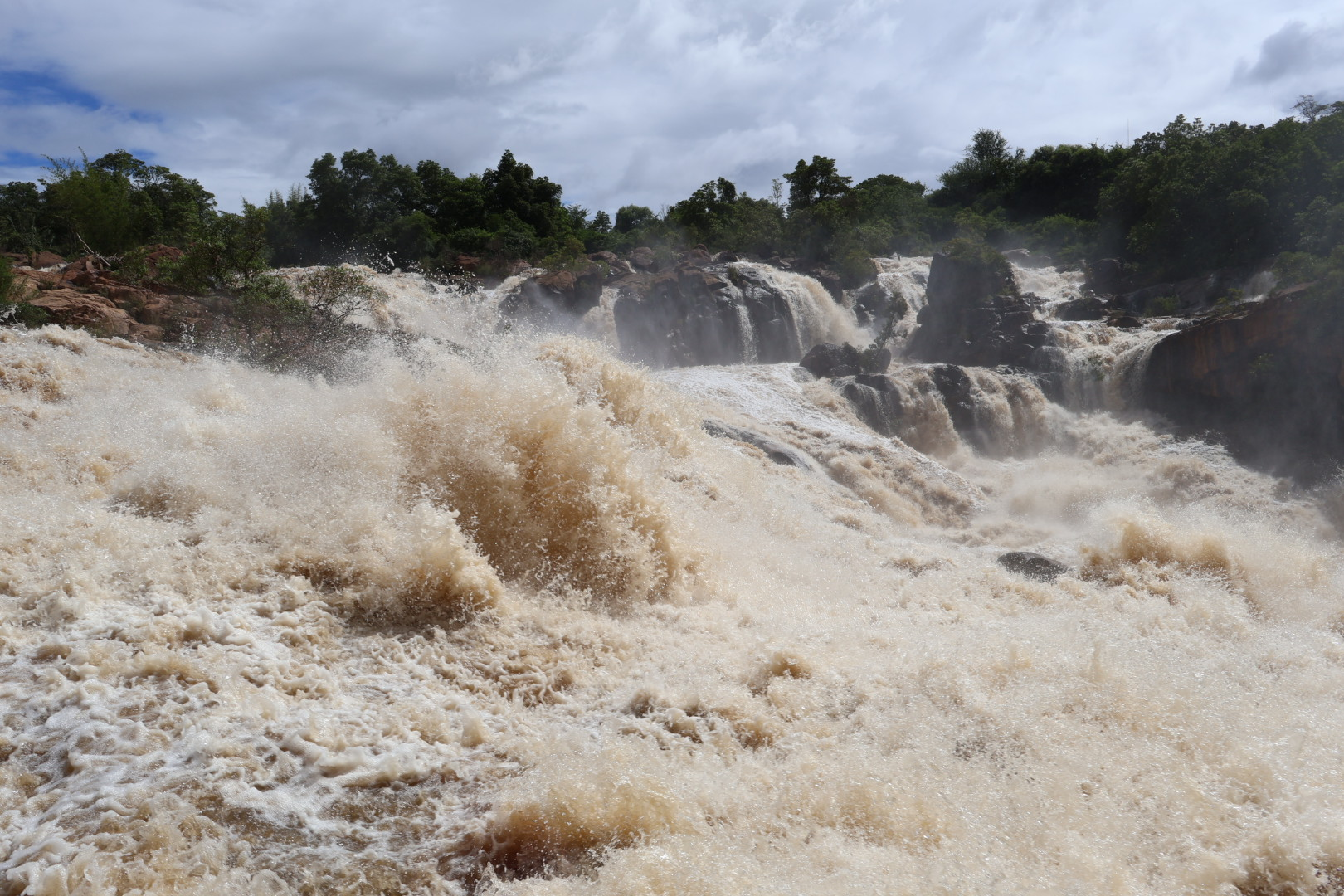
Crocodile River in the Lowveld Botanical Garden while in flood in January 2026

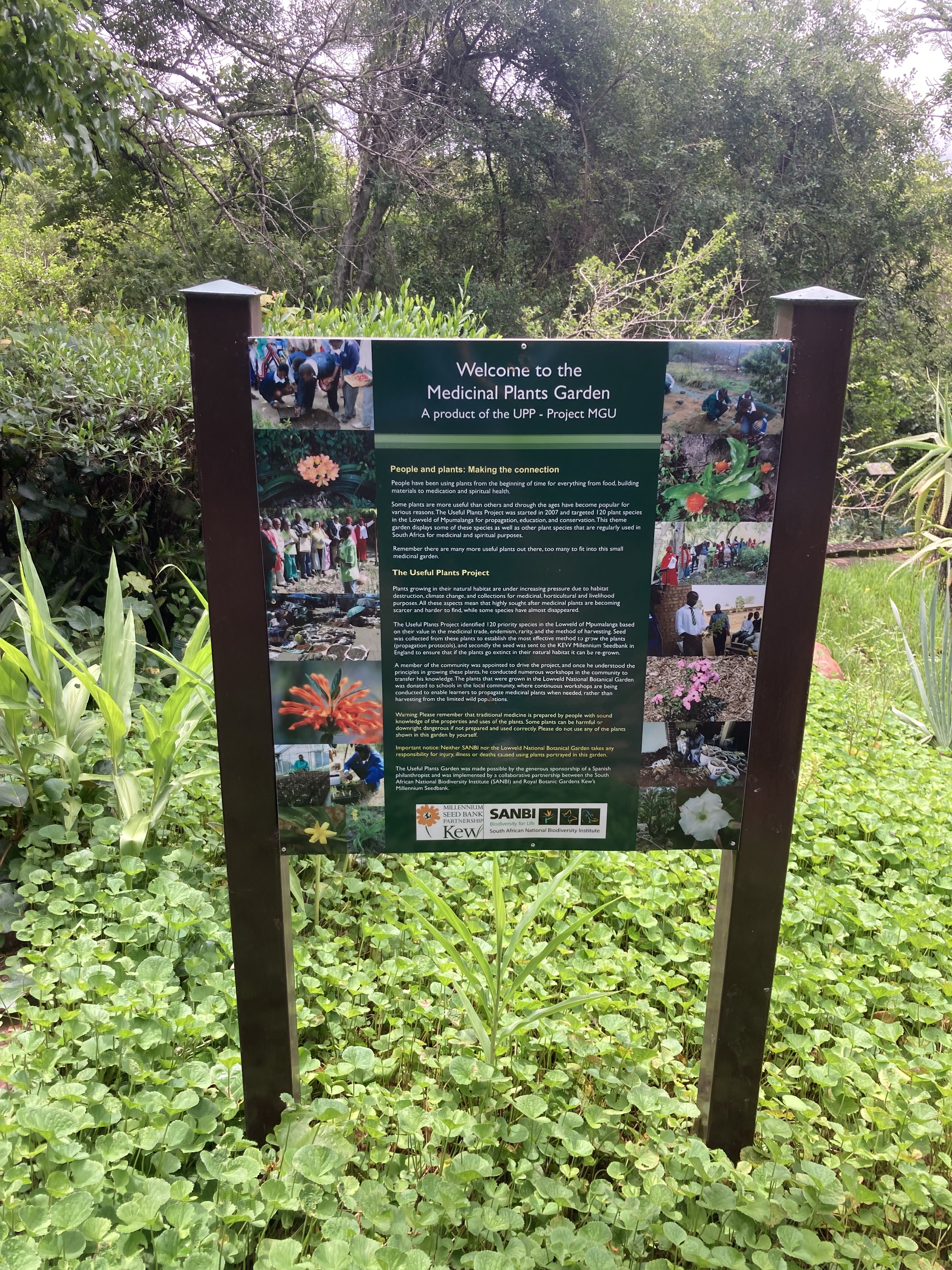
Medicinal Plants Garden sign in the Lowveld National Botanical Garden

== See also ==
- List of botanical gardens in South Africa
