= Alldays, South Africa =

Alldays
- Location within Limpopo Location within South Africa
- Coordinates: 22°40′S 29°6′E
- Country: South Africa
- Province: Limpopo
- District: Capricorn
- Municipality: Blouberg

Area
  - Total: 2.42 km^{2} (0.93 sq mi)

Population (2011)
  - Total: 2,987
  - Density: 1,230/km^{2} (3,200/sq mi)

Racial makeup (2011)
  - Black African: 97.7%
  - Coloured: 0.1%
  - Indian/Asian: 0.3%
  - White: 1.6%
  - Other: 0.3%

First languages (2011)
  - Northern Sotho: 85.8%
  - Venda: 4.9%
  - English: 1.9%
  - Afrikaans: 1.6%
  - Other: 5.9%
- Time zone: UTC+2 (SAST)
- Postal code (street): 0909
- PO box: 0909
- Area code: 015

Alldays is a small town in the Limpopo province of South Africa that serves a large area of private game and hunting farms. It has a population of 2,987.

The Venetia Diamond Mine is situated close to Alldays, located within the 360 square kilometre Venetia Limpopo Nature Reserve. It is one of De Beers’ six remaining diamond mines in South Africa and the only major diamond mine to be developed in the country during the past 25 years. Citrus farming on the banks of the Limpopo River is an important economic activity in the district.

The area of is known for its arid bushveld and Mopane bush. Several large game farms are located around Alldays, many of which are known as trophy hunting destinations. The hunting practices carried out at an Alldays game farm sparked significant public outcry in September 2015; however, the Limpopo environmental department found the farm to be compliant with South African hunting legislation. The town is served by the Alldays Airport.

The Blouberg ('blue mountain') mountain range is situated close to Alldays, and is a popular rock climbing destination.
