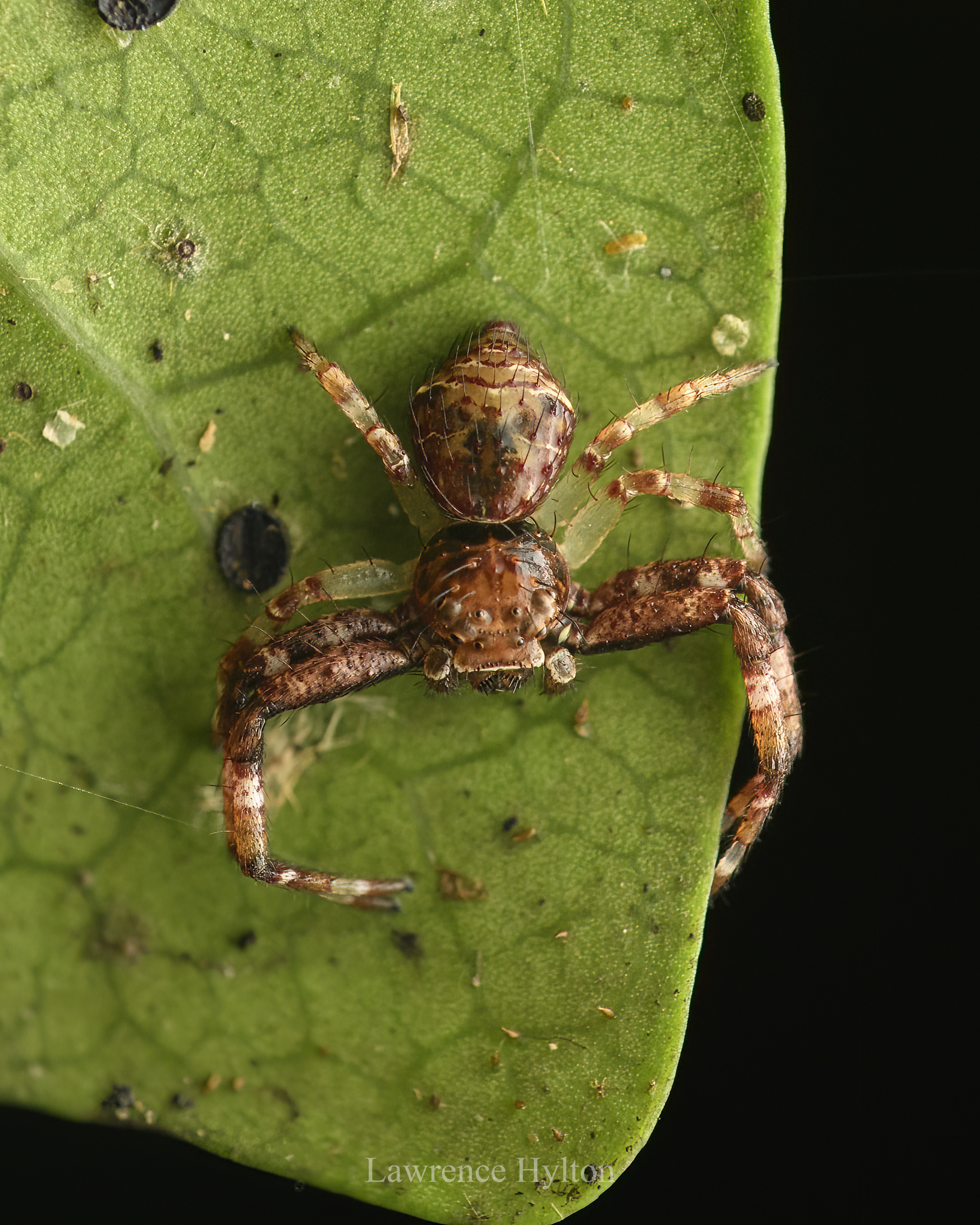
- S. guizhouensis from Hong Kong

Scientific classification
- Kingdom: Animalia
- Phylum: Arthropoda
- Subphylum: Chelicerata
- Class: Arachnida
- Order: Araneae
- Infraorder: Araneomorphae
- Family: Thomisidae
- Genus: Strigoplus; Simon

Type species
- Strigoplus albostriatus

Species
- Strigoplus albostriatus Simon, 1885 – Bhutan, Malaysia, Java; Strigoplus bilobus Saha & Raychaudhuri, 2004 – India; Strigoplus guizhouensis Song, 1990 – China; Strigoplus moluri Patel, 2003 – India; Strigoplus netravati Tikader, 1963 – India

= Strigoplus =

Genus of spiders

Strigoplus is a genus of spiders in the family Thomisidae. It was first described in 1885 by French arachnologist Eugène Simon in his work "Matériaux pour servir à la faune arachnologique de l'Asie méridionale". As of 2025, it contains five species from Asia.

== Description ==
Based on Simon's original description, Strigoplus spiders are characterized by having a relatively short and wide cephalothorax compared to the length. The posterior eyes are arranged in a moderately recurved line, with the median eyes nearly equidistant from each other and much closer together than the lateral eyes. The anterior eyes are arranged in a slightly recurved line, with the median eyes much smaller and closer together than the lateral eyes.

The clypeus area is about as wide as long, constricted and depressed at the base below the eyes, then thickened and slightly projecting forward, with a wide anterior margin. The chelicerae are short, and the apical portions are strongly acute. Both labial and maxillary parts are strongly acute.

== Distribution ==
The genus Strigoplus is distributed across tropical and subtropical regions of Asia, with species recorded from China, India, Bhutan, Malaysia, and Indonesia.

== Taxonomy ==
Simon noted in his original description that this genus has some relationships with the genera Tmarus and Pherecydes , but distinguished it easily by the anterior median eyes being much more separated from each other than from the lateral eyes, by the broader group of median eyes in front than behind, and finally by the armature of the front, the bandeau, the chelicerae and the buccal pieces.

Simon also noted it approaches the genus Strophius Keyserling, but differs by its obtuse labial piece, its equidistant posterior eyes, and its anterior tibiae and metatarsi that are cylindrical and provided underneath with series of spines.
