= Mookamedi Secondary School =

- Jakkalskuil, Mokopane, Limpopo, South Africa

Information
- School type: Public school
- Motto: Knowledge is freedom
- Established: 1985
- Head teacher: Mr K.D Manganye
- Staff: approx. 8 full-time
- Grades: 8-12
- Enrollment: Approximately 250 pupils
- Colors: White, Sky-blue and Grey
- Governing Authority: Limpopo Department of Education

Mookamedi Secondary School is a South African Public Secondary School located in Jakkalskuil Village, Bakenberg South, Mokopane, Limpopo province. It came to existence in 1985.

== History ==
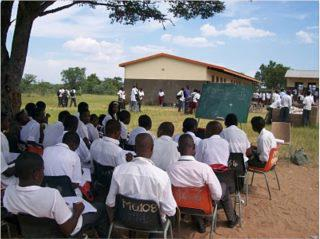
Mookamedi Secondary School around 2005–2007, photo by Tiyiko Mathe

Mookamedi Secondary School was established in 1985 as a Government School.

The first Matric class wrote examinations in 1990, five years following the school inception. As number of students registering with the institution increased in 2009, the school was offered mobile classes to serve as additional classrooms. The school serves learners from nearby villages such as Kabeane, Bokwidi, Kgalakwena, Basterspad as well as Jakkalskuil as a whole. The approximate average number of students attending at Mookamedi Secondary School ranges from 240 to 270 yearly.

=== Principals ===
- Mr. J.E Majoko
- Mr. K.D Manganye

== Venture ==
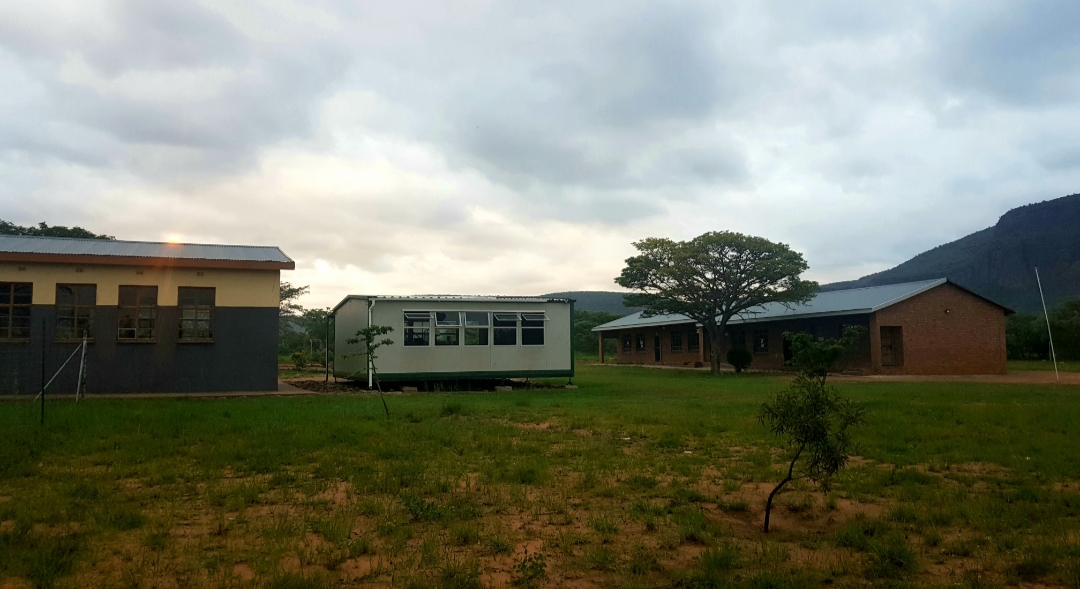
Mookamedi Secondary School

In 2010 the Embassy of Japan, which is a diplomatic mission of Japan to South Africa, built one block that contains 4 classrooms at Mookamedi Secondary School. The opening ceremony of these classes was held on 23 May 2014. Service rendered by Japanese Embassy known as Grant Assistance for Grassroots Human Security Projects (GGP) Programme, is estimated to R499 440.00 for building one block of classrooms which contains four classrooms.

== Clubs and activities ==
- LRC
- Netball
- Athletics
- Volleyball
- Soccer

== See also ==
- List of high schools in South Africa
