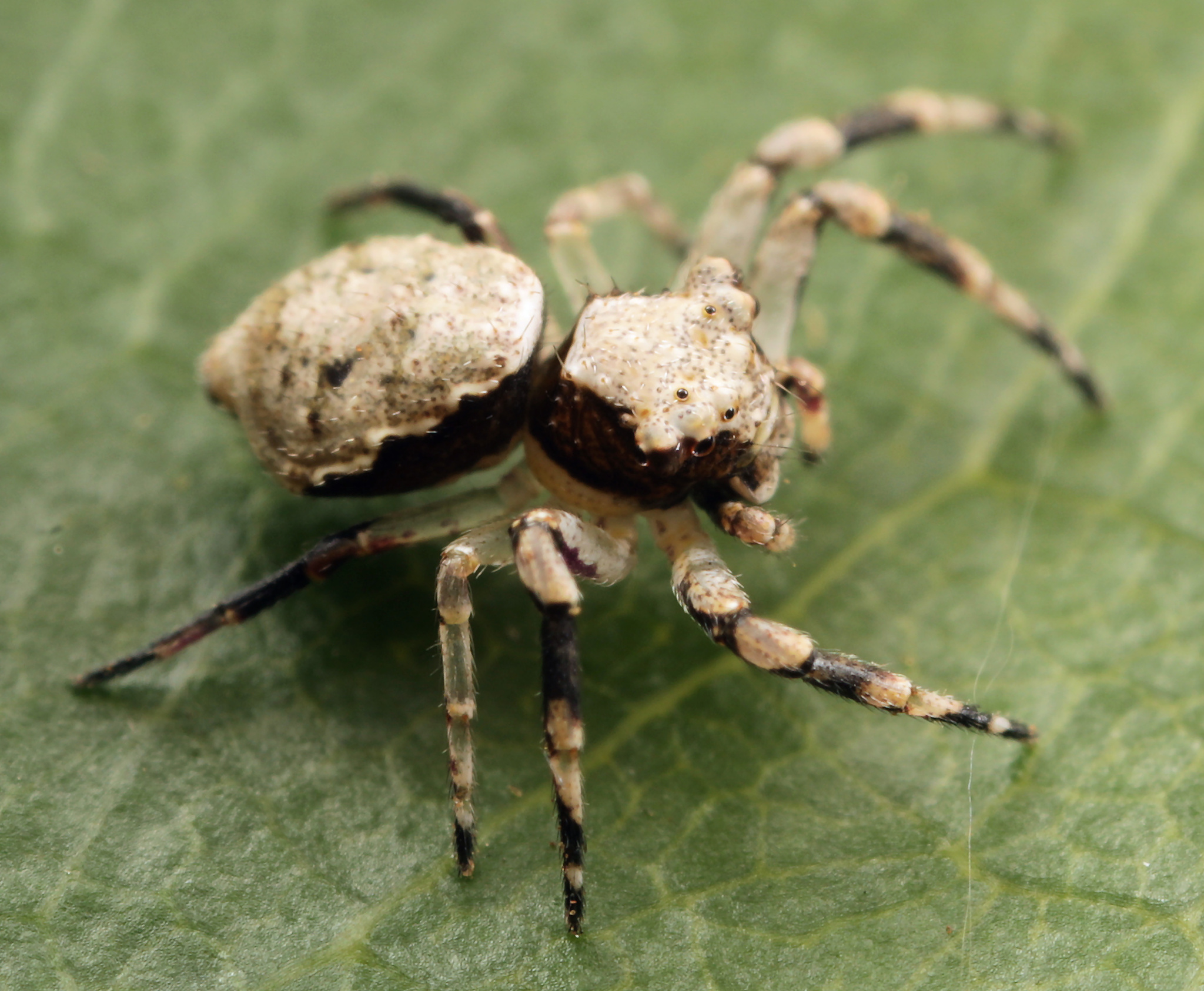

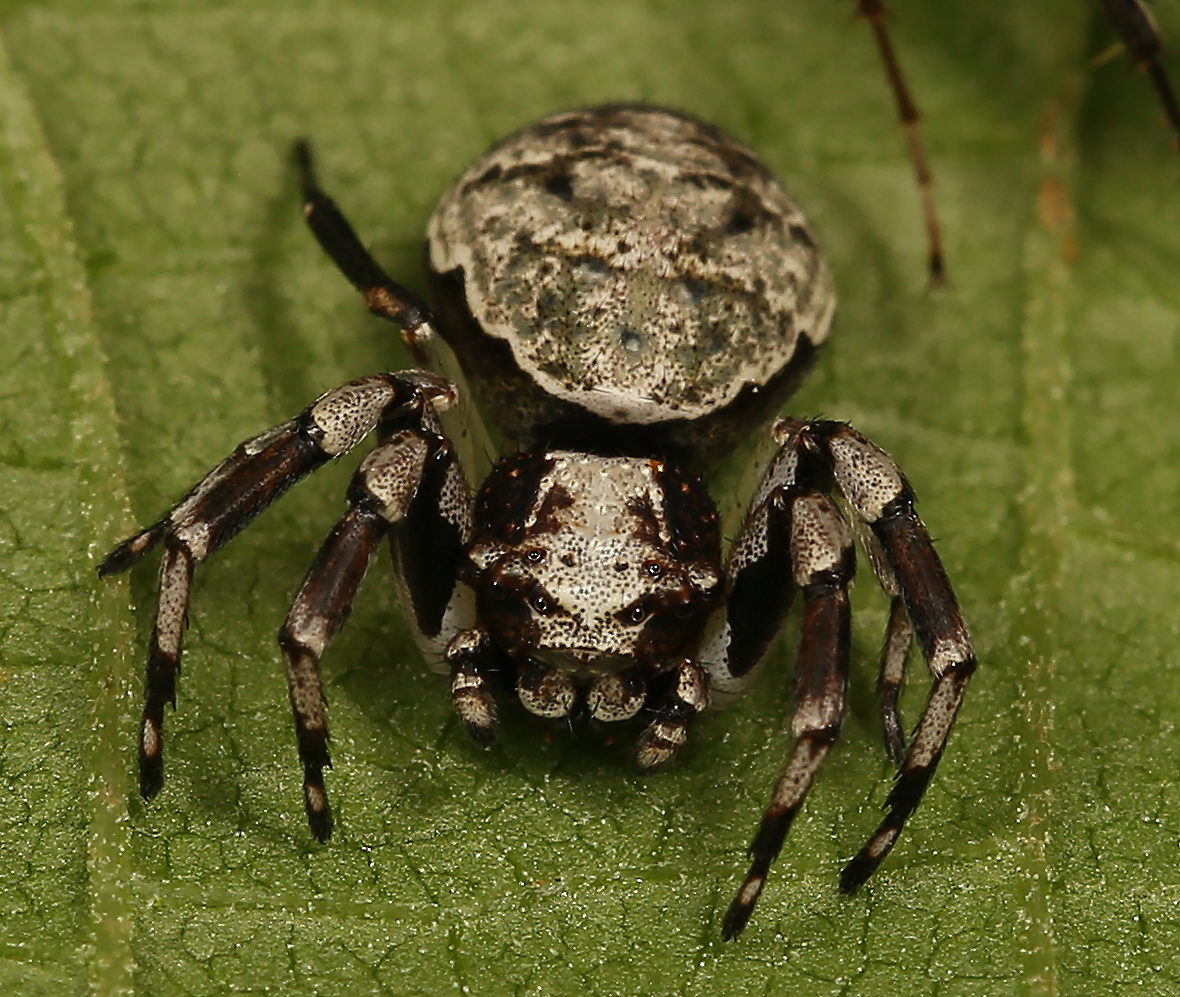

Scientific classification
- Kingdom: Animalia
- Phylum: Arthropoda
- Subphylum: Chelicerata
- Class: Arachnida
- Order: Araneae
- Infraorder: Araneomorphae
- Family: Thomisidae
- Genus: Pherecydes
- Species: P. zebra

Binomial name
- Pherecydes zebra Lawrence, 1927

= Pherecydes zebra =

Zebra Pherecydes Crab Spider

Species of spider

Pherecydes zebra is a species of spider in the family Thomisidae. It is found in Africa and is commonly known as zebra Pherecydes crab spider.

== Distribution ==
Pherecydes zebra is found in Burkina Faso, Mozambique, Namibia, Tanzania, and South Africa.

In South Africa, the species is known from KwaZulu-Natal, Limpopo, and Mpumalanga. Notable locations include Hluhluwe Nature Reserve, Kosi Bay Nature Reserve, Ndumo Game Reserve, Ophathe Game Reserve, Tembe Elephant Park, iSimangaliso Wetland Park, Nylsvley Nature Reserve, and Makalali Private Game Reserve.

The subspecies Pherecydes zebra tropicalis is endemic to Burkina Faso.

== Habitat and ecology ==
Pherecydes zebra are tree and grass dwellers and inhabit the Grassland, Forest, and Savanna biomes at altitudes ranging from 47 to 1415 m.

== Description ==
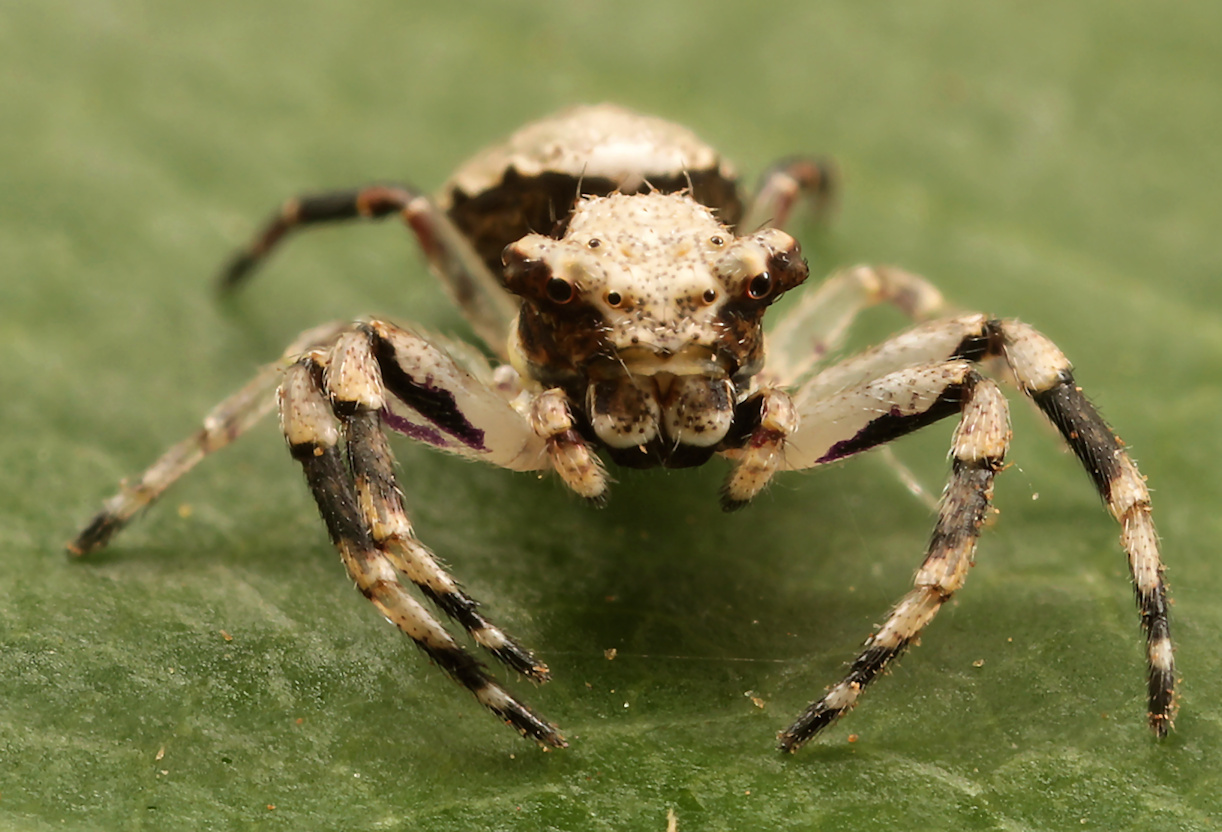

== Conservation ==
Pherecydes zebra is listed as Least Concern due to its wide geographical range. The species is recorded in eight reserves.

== Taxonomy ==
The species was originally described by Lawrence in 1927 from Namibia. It was revised by Dippenaar-Schoeman in 1980. Both sexes are known.
