= Pherecydes lucinae =

Scientific classification
- Kingdom: Animalia
- Phylum: Arthropoda
- Subphylum: Chelicerata
- Class: Arachnida
- Order: Araneae
- Infraorder: Araneomorphae
- Family: Thomisidae
- Genus: Pherecydes
- Species: P. lucinae

Binomial name
- Pherecydes lucinae Dippenaar-Schoeman, 1980

Species of spider

Pherecydes lucinae is a species of spider in the family Thomisidae. It is endemic to South Africa.

== Distribution ==
Pherecydes lucinae is found in South Africa, where it is known from the Eastern Cape, KwaZulu-Natal, Limpopo, and North West. Notable locations include Dassiekrans, Grahamstown, Pietermaritzburg, Pongola, Nylsvley Nature Reserve, and Rustenburg Nature Reserve.

== Habitat and ecology ==
Pherecydes lucinae inhabits the Grassland, Savanna, and Thicket biomes at altitudes ranging from 271 to 1556 m.

These tree and grass dwellers have been sampled from Lucerne fields and pine plantations.

== Conservation ==
Pherecydes lucinae is listed as Least Concern by the South African National Biodiversity Institute due to its wide geographical range. The species is recorded in three reserves including Nylsvley, Blouberg, and Rustenburg.

== Taxonomy ==
The species was originally described by Dippenaar-Schoeman in 1980 from Farm Vergeval, Pongola, KwaZulu-Natal. Both sexes are known.
