= Kabeane =

- Location within Limpopo Location within South Africa
- Coordinates: 23.85755°S 28.60789°E
- Country: South Africa
- Province: Limpopo
- District: Waterberg
- Municipality: Mogalakwena

Population (2011)Census 2011
  - Total: 410

Racial makeup

First languages
  - Northern Sotho: 71%
  - Tsonga: 28%
  - Other: 1%
- Time zone: UTC+2 (SAST)
- Postal code (street): 0633
- PO box: 0633

Kabeane is a village in the Mogalakwena Local Municipality of the Waterberg District Municipality of the Limpopo province in South Africa. The village's home town is Mokopane. The village is named after the "Kabeane River" which is one of the tributaries of the Mogalakwena River.

== Course ==
Residents of Kabeane village source water from Kabeane River, which supply Mogalakwena River with water.

== Population ==
According to City-Facts data collection, in 1975 population was estimated at 236, 319 in 1990, 348 in 2000 and 360 in 2015. The year 2015 population was estimated to 360 people, male estimated at 164 making 45.4%, and female was estimated at 196 being the highest at 54.6%, indicating population changed from 1976 to 2015 was high at +52.5% compared to population changed from 2000 to 2015, at lower growth rate of +3.4%.

== Development ==
Kabeane is one of the villages that lack municipal service delivery provided by Mogalakwena Local Municipality which is headed by Waterberg District Municipality of the ANC (African National Congress). Kabeane Village was one of the 38 villages that was listed by Mokgalakwena Local Municipality for WATER PROJECT which will help the community of these villages with water, the project was reported worth of R300 Million. The village's main challenges drilling and equipping new boreholes, storm water control, job creation, bulk containers, high-master lightning, sports facilities, community hall, home affairs satellite office, were listed for 2020/2021 development plan by Mogalakwena Local Municipality of the ANC. Nkontlha Primary School is used as voting station for the residents of Kabeane during National Elections in South Africa.

== Schools ==
=== Primary ===
- Nkontlha Primary school.

=== Secondary ===
Learners from Kabeane village, attend secondary schools from near by villages such as Jakkalskuil's Mookamedi Secondary School and Basterspad's Nkogru High, which are both located in Bakenberg South. Over the years, the two secondary schools have become the top leading schools in the Bakenberg South District.

==== Mookamedi Secondary history ====
Mookamedi Secondary School, is known by people who live in these villages that it was initially supposed to be built at Kabeane, Jakkalskuil community asked Kabeane community to allow the school to be headed between Kabeane and Jakkalskuil for both learners from these villages to be able to attend school. The school was established in 1985 as "Mookamedi Secondary School", which later people from Jakkalskuil immigrated next to the school, which is now part of Jakkalskuil known as Mookamedi.
