= Cas Janse van Vuuren =

South African academic

- Born: Jan Casper Gerhardus Janse van Vuuren; 20 February 1930; Nylstroom, Transvaal, Union of South Africa
- Died: 3 June 2014 (aged 84)

Academic background
- Education: University of Pretoria

Jan Casper “Cas” Gerhardus Janse van Vuuren (20 February 1930 – 3 June 2014) joined the University of South Africa in 1964 and worked his way up to rector and vice chancellor (1989 to 1993).

== Biography ==
Van Vuuren was born on 20 February 1930 in the district of Nylstroom (now Modimolle). He matriculated from Nylstroom High School and obtained a teaching diploma in 1951 and an MA degree in German.

In 1958 he conducted research for his doctoral thesis in pedagogy in Germany and Switzerland with a scholarship from the German government. He received his PhD from the University of Pretoria in 1963, followed by a BA (Hons) degree the following year in philosophy, from the same university.

He taught at Hoërskool Brits, the Afrikaans High School for Boys and the Gymnasium for boys in Gummersbach, Germany, before joining UNISA in 1964. In 1967, Van Vuuren was invited by the Goethe Institute, a global cultural institute, to visit various teaching centers in Germany. Van Vuuren served as a senior lecturer after which he was promoted to professor and head of the Department of Fundamental Pedagogy in 1968.

In 1971 he was appointed assistant to the dean and the following year as dean of the Faculty of Education.

The College of Law has a building on the Muckleneuk campus that was named after Cas van Vuuren.

One of the highlights of his term was the purchase of a Rieger Concert organ for what is now the ZK Matthews Hall.

Some of his personal achievements include: the DAAD scholarship to study in Germany, his appointments as a council member of the Pretoria Technikon, council member and member of the senate of the Pretoria College for Further Education, member of the advisory committee of the Pretoria College of Education, and member of the Transvaal Teachers' Association Executive Committee.

Van Vuuren published a German textbook (with G.A. Venter) as well as several articles on fundamental pedagogy. He was the chief marker for German in the then Transvaal matriculation examination. He was an elder in the N.G. Church and served on the board of Anton van Wouw Primary School. He was also a life member of the Federation of Afrikaans Cultural Associations (FAK).

He died on the 3 June 2014 after being diagnosed with a stomach ulcer.
