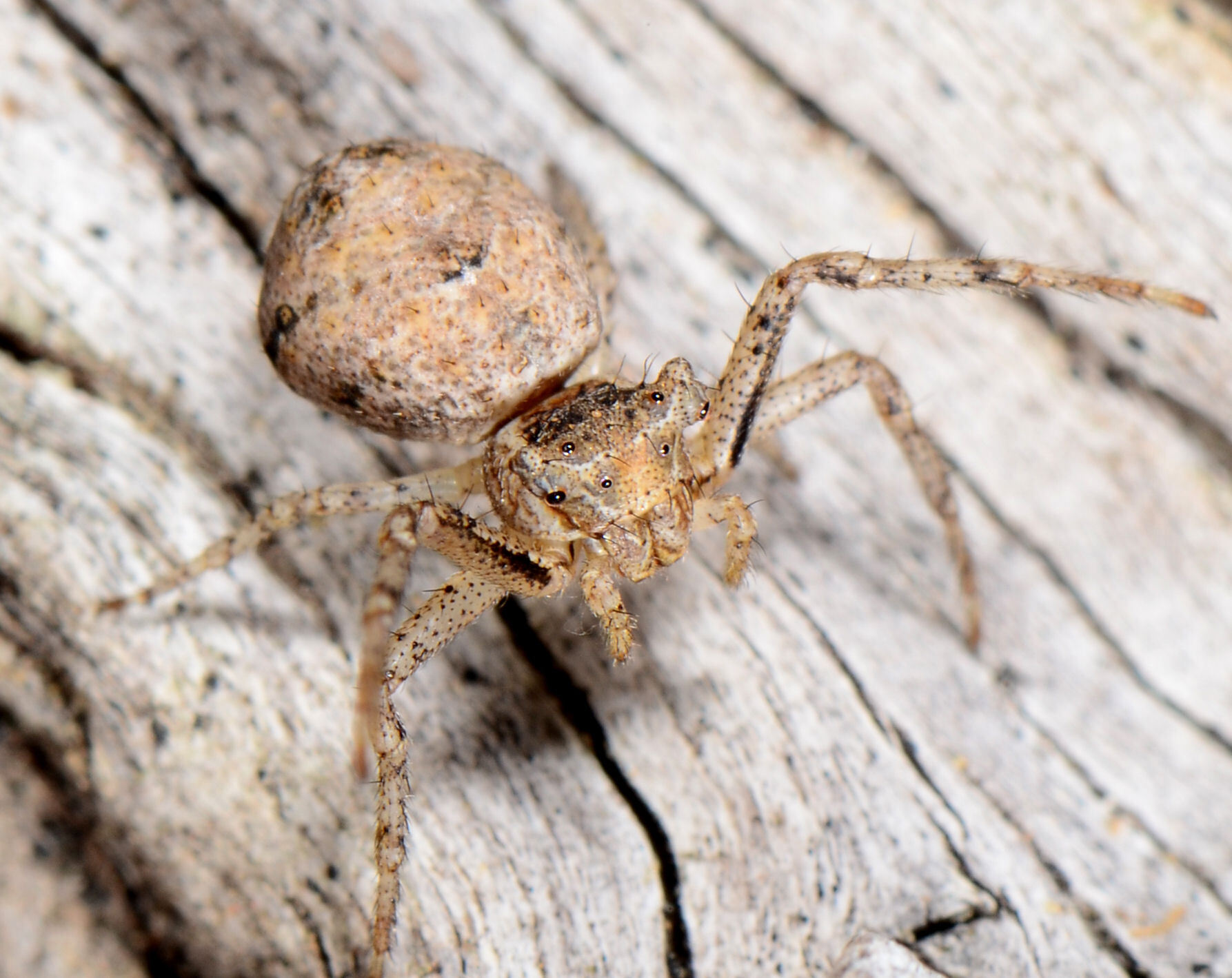
- female
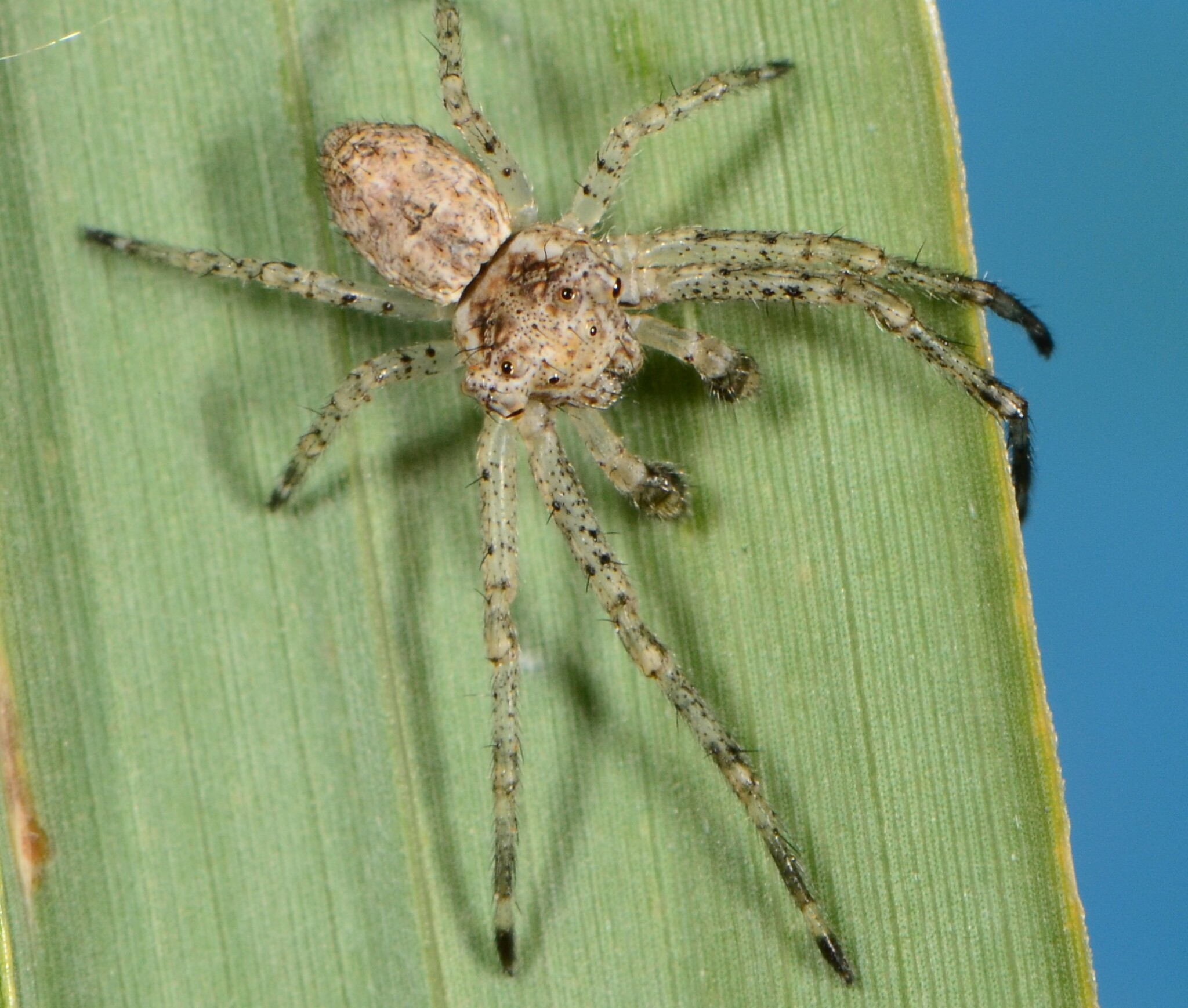
- male

Scientific classification
- Kingdom: Animalia
- Phylum: Arthropoda
- Subphylum: Chelicerata
- Class: Arachnida
- Order: Araneae
- Infraorder: Araneomorphae
- Family: Thomisidae
- Genus: Pherecydes
- Species: P. tuberculatus

Binomial name
- Pherecydes tuberculatus O. Pickard-Cambridge, 1883

= Pherecydes tuberculatus =

Common Pherecydes Crab Spider

Species of spider

Pherecydes tuberculatus is a species of spider in the family Thomisidae. It is found in southern Africa and is commonly known as common Pherecydes crab spider.

== Distribution ==
Pherecydes tuberculatus is found in Lesotho and South Africa.

In South Africa, the species is known from the Eastern Cape, Free State, KwaZulu-Natal, Limpopo, Northern Cape, and Western Cape. Notable locations include Addo Elephant National Park, Golden Gate Highlands National Park, Oribi Gorge Nature Reserve, Polokwane Nature Reserve, Richtersveld National Park, Tswalu Kalahari Reserve, Fernkloof Nature Reserve, Kirstenbosch National Botanical Garden, and Swartberg Nature Reserve.

== Habitat and ecology ==
Pherecydes tuberculatus inhabits the Grassland, Fynbos, Forest, Nama Karoo, Thicket, and Savanna biomes at altitudes ranging from 6 to 2826 m.

These tree and grass dwellers have been sampled from Lucerne fields and pine plantations.

== Description ==
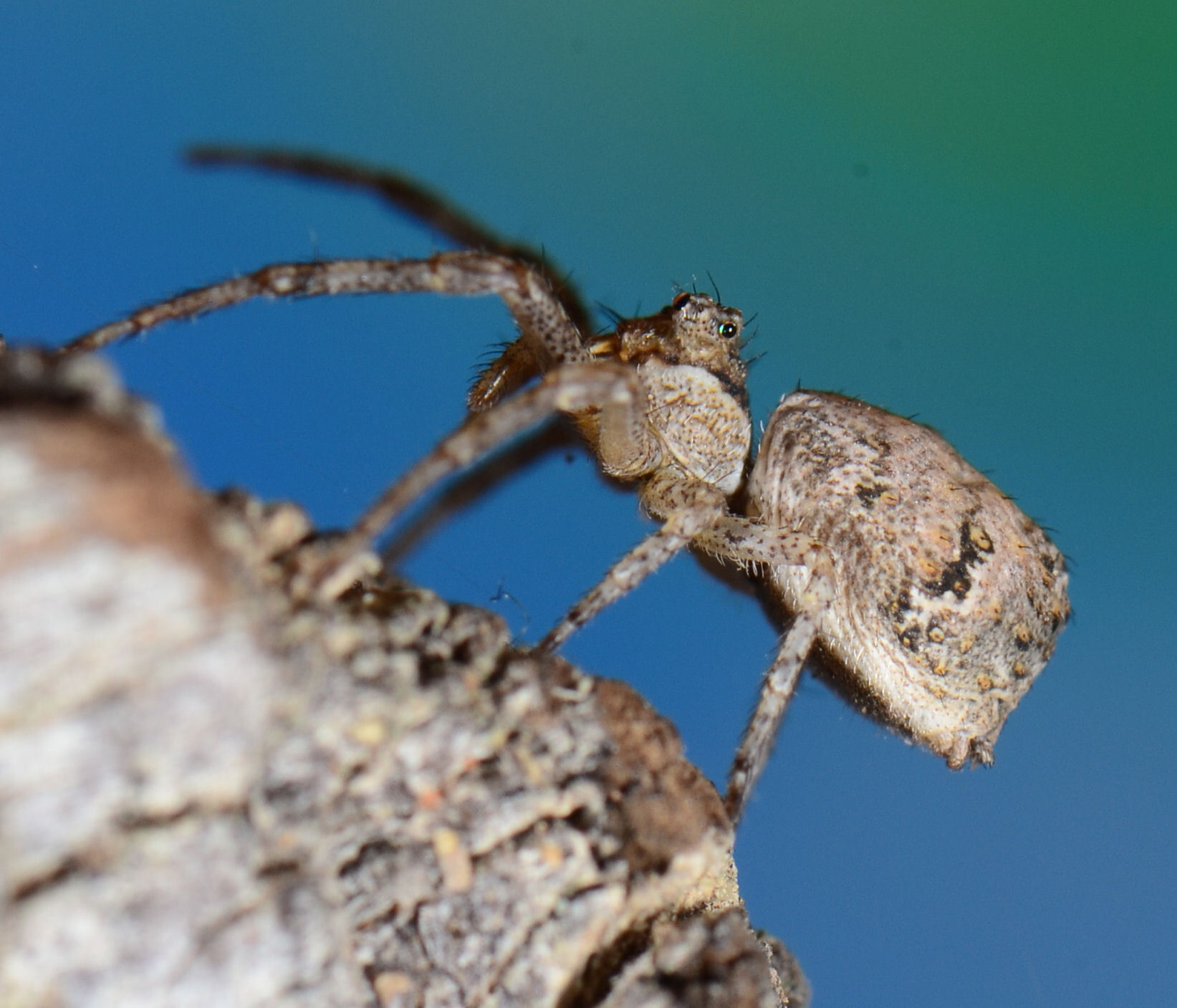
female

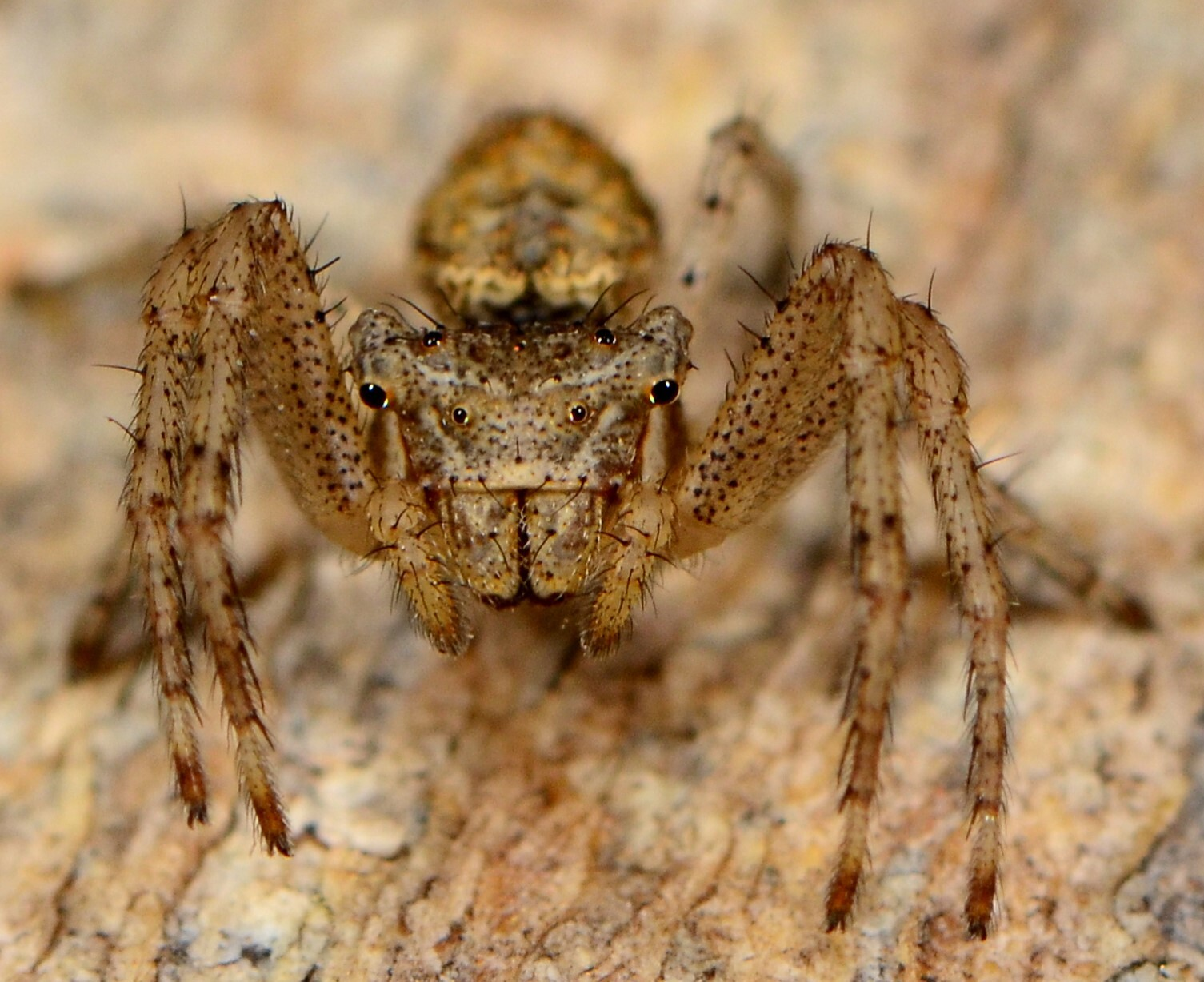
female

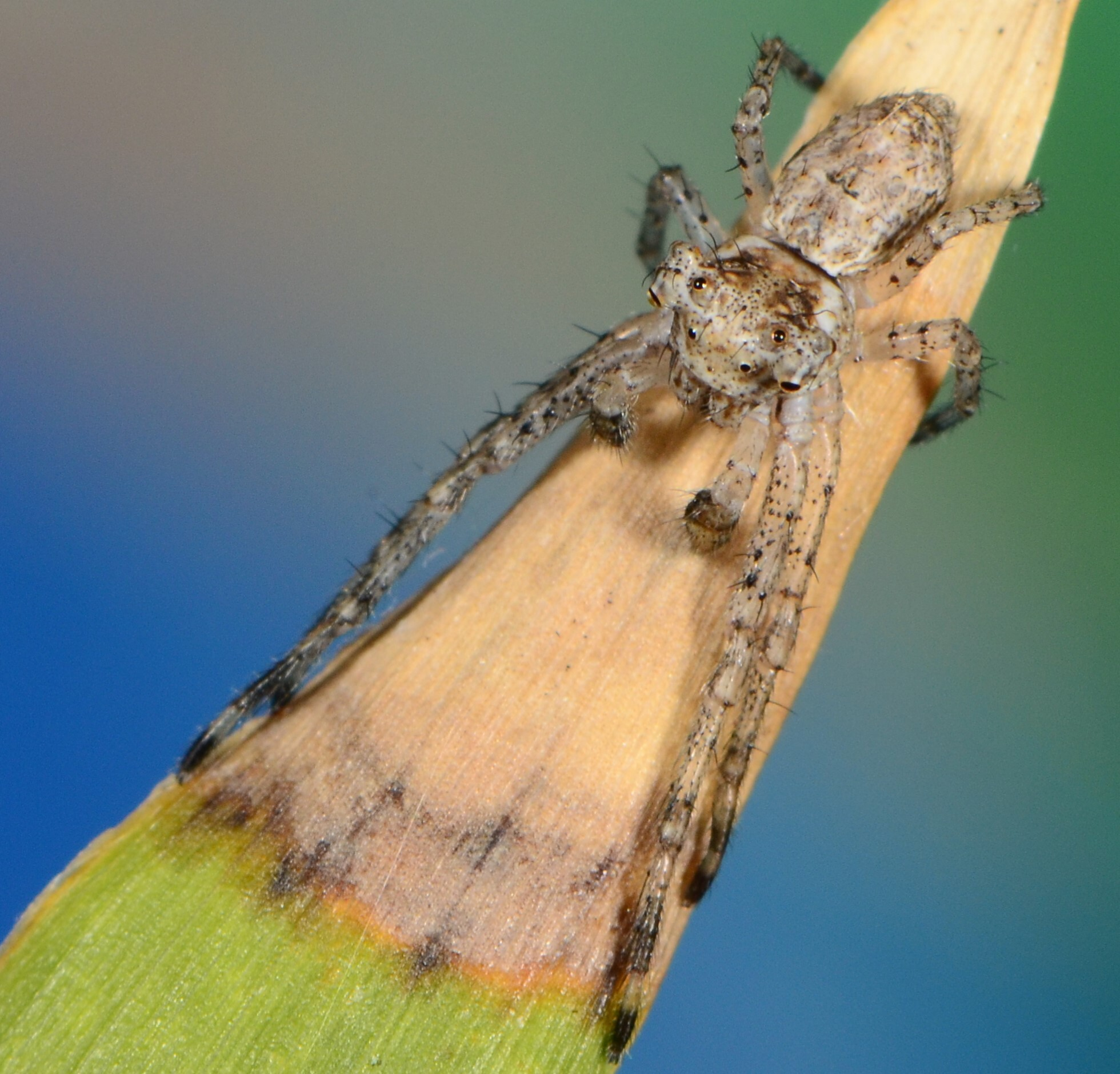
male

== Conservation ==
Pherecydes tuberculatus is listed as Least Concern by the South African National Biodiversity Institute due to its wide geographical range. The species is recorded in more than ten protected areas.

== Taxonomy ==
The species was originally described by O. Pickard-Cambridge in 1883 with the type locality given only as Caffraria. The species was revised by Dippenaar-Schoeman in 1980. Both sexes are known.
