= Doorndraai Dam =

- Interactive map of Doorndraai Dam
- Official name: Doorndraai Dam
- Location: Limpopo, South Africa
- Coordinates: 24°16′45″S 28°46′1″E
- Opening date: 1952 (renovated in 1974)
- Operators: Department of Water Affairs and Forestry

Dam and spillways
- Type of dam: buttress
- Impounds: Sterk River
- Height: 28 m
- Length: 236 m

Reservoir
- Creates: Doorndraai Dam Reservoir
- Total capacity: 46 500 000 m³
- Catchment area: 595 km^{2}
- Surface area: 560.6 ha

Doorndraai Dam is a buttress type dam on the Sterk River, Mogalakwena River basin, located near Mokopane, Limpopo, South Africa. It was established in 1952 and has been renovated in 1974. Its primary purpose is for municipal and industrial use. The hazard potential is ranked to be high.

== See also ==
- List of reservoirs and dams in South Africa
- List of rivers of South Africa
