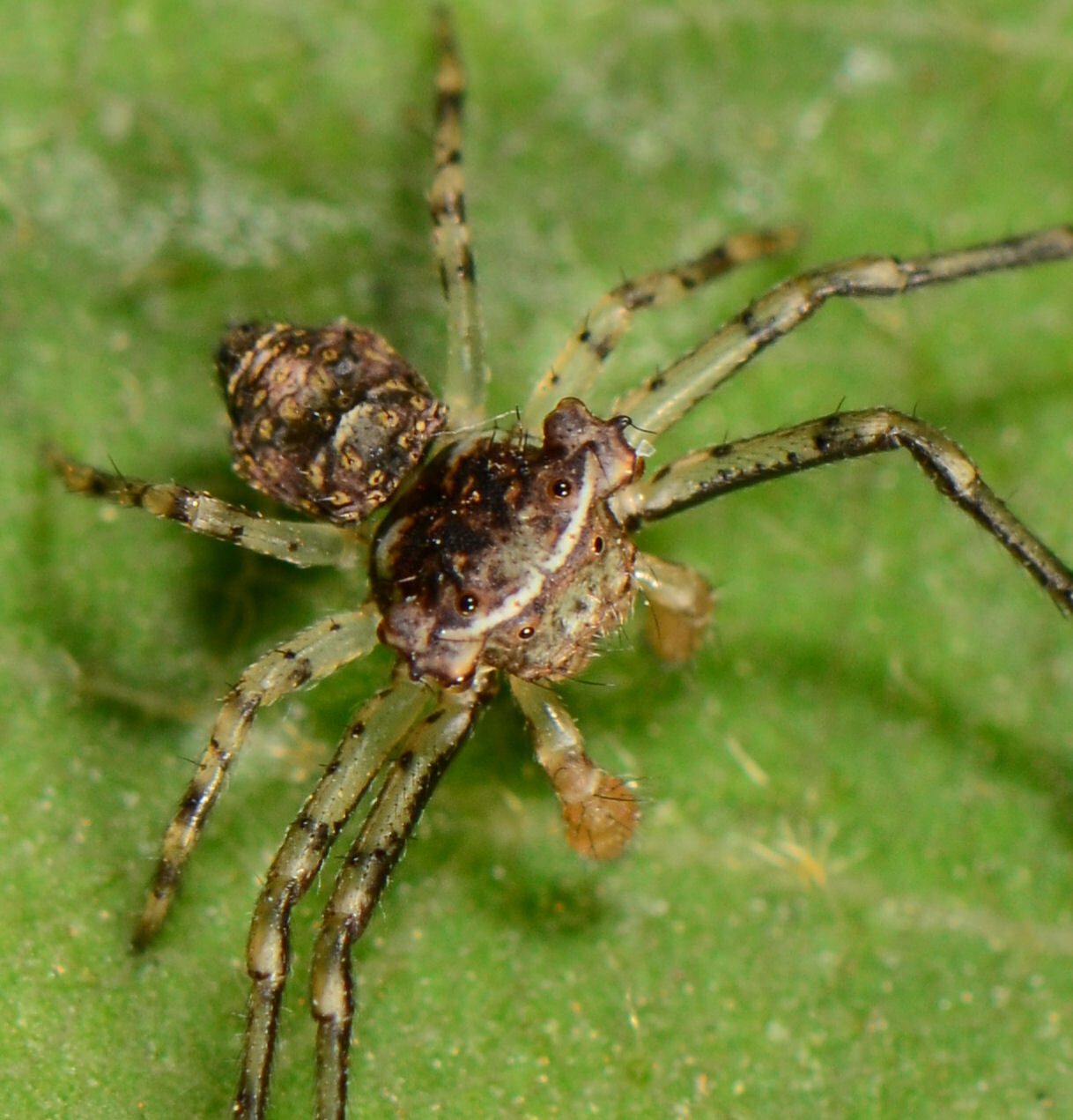
- male
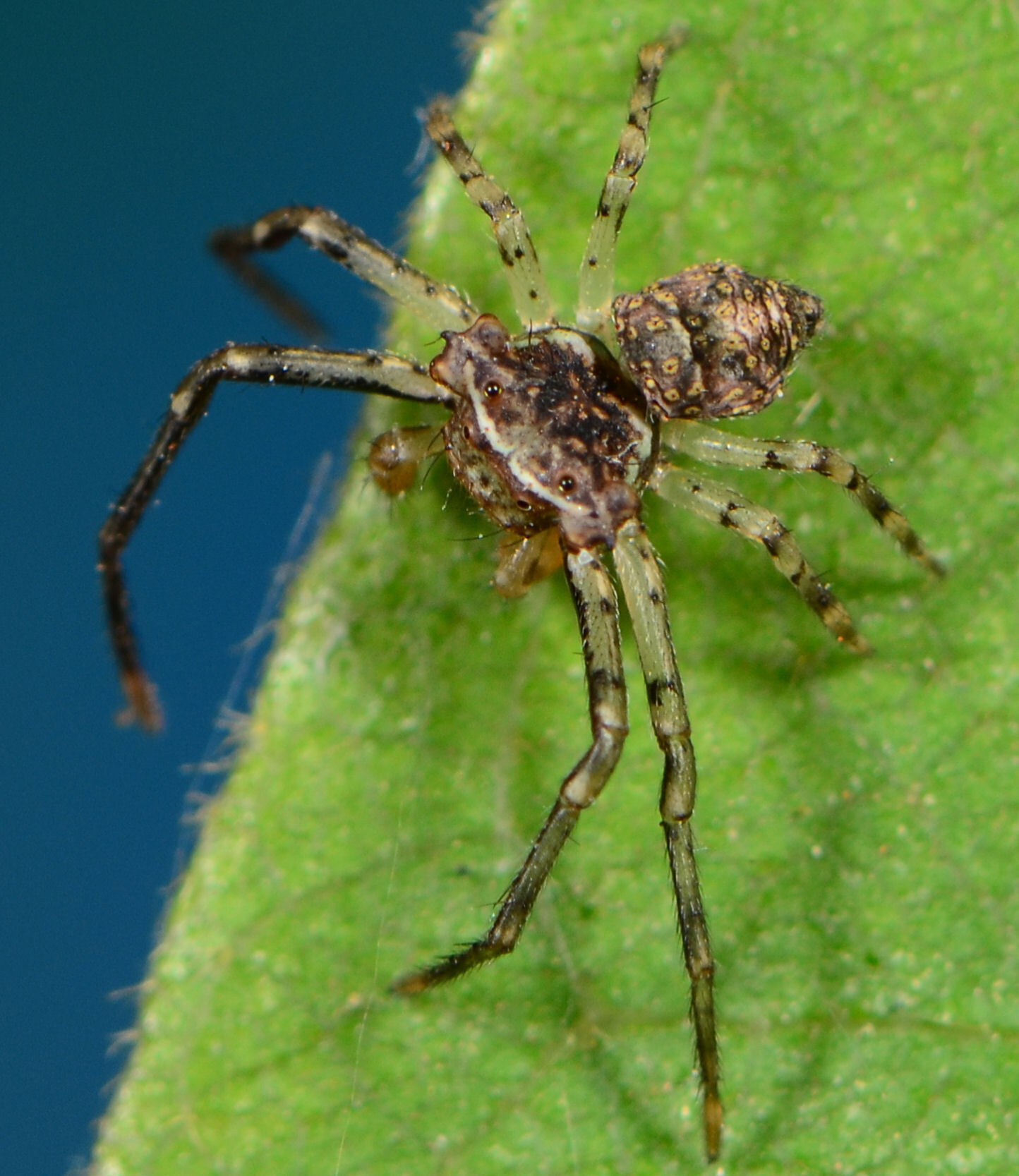
- male

Scientific classification
- Kingdom: Animalia
- Phylum: Arthropoda
- Subphylum: Chelicerata
- Class: Arachnida
- Order: Araneae
- Infraorder: Araneomorphae
- Family: Thomisidae
- Genus: Pherecydes
- Species: P. nicolaasi

Binomial name
- Pherecydes nicolaasi Dippenaar-Schoeman, 1980

= Pherecydes nicolaasi =

Nico's Pherecydes Crab Spider

Species of spider

Pherecydes nicolaasi is a species of spider in the family Thomisidae. It is endemic to South Africa and is commonly known as Nico's Pherecydes crab spider.

== Distribution ==
Pherecydes nicolaasi is found in South Africa, where it is known from the Eastern Cape, KwaZulu-Natal, and Limpopo.

Notable locations include Grahamstown, Ngome State Forest, Pietermaritzburg, Tembe Elephant Park, Umgeni Valley Nature Reserve, Luvhondo Nature Reserve, Polokwane Nature Reserve, Lekgalameetse Nature Reserve, and Magoebaskloof.

== Habitat and ecology ==
Pherecydes nicolaasi inhabits the Grassland, Thicket, Savanna, and Forest biomes at altitudes ranging from 91 to 1411 m. These are tree and grass dwellers.

== Conservation ==
Pherecydes nicolaasi is listed as Least Concern by the South African National Biodiversity Institute due to its wide geographical range. The species is well protected in six reserves.

== Taxonomy ==
The species was originally described by Dippenaar-Schoeman in 1980 from Ngome State Forest in KwaZulu-Natal. Both sexes are known.
