= Nyl River =

River in Limpopo Province, South Africa

Nyl River Nylrivier
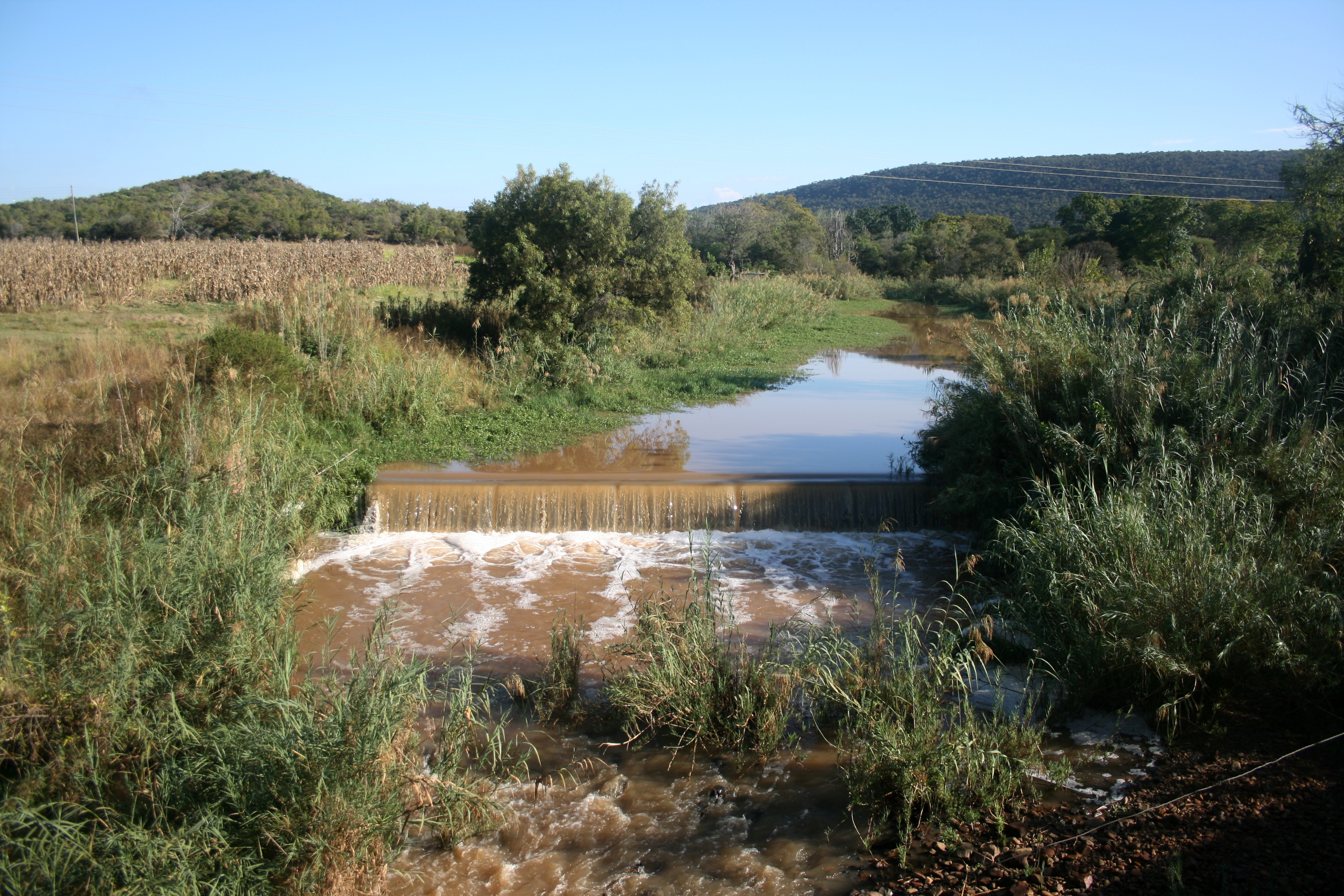
- Dropping over a weir in its upper reaches

- Location of the Nyl River mouth
- Etymology: Meaning "Nile" in the Afrikaans language; the river owes its name to a confusion

Location
- Country: South Africa
- State: Limpopo Province

Physical characteristics
- Source: Waterberg Massif
  - location: Near Bela-Bela (Warmbad)
  - elevation: 1,200 m (3,900 ft)
- Mouth
  - location: Mogalakwena River
  - coordinates: 24°16′25″S 28°58′37″E
  - elevation: 1,060 m (3,480 ft)
- Basin size: 2,425 km^{2} (936 sq mi)

The Nyl River (Afrikaans: Nylrivier) is a watercourse in Limpopo Province, South Africa. It flows at the head of the Mogalakwena River, being its southernmost tributary or uppermost section. It is located near Mookgophong (Naboomspruit) in the northern part of the Springbok Flats, a particular geological formation.

The name of the Nyl River originated in the word for "Nile". In the 1860s, a group of pious and enthusiastic Dutch Voortrekkers known as the Jerusalemgangers, saw the large flooded plain with its wide river flowing lazily northwards and were under the impression that they had arrived at the mighty Nylrivier, the Nile river. They settled the place and founded a town in 1866, calling it Nylstroom.

== Course ==
The Nyl river is fed mostly by smaller tributaries flowing from the Waterberg Massif that flow roughly northeastwards into a wide and shallow plain with a very feeble gradient. The main stream is known as Groot Nyl and has its sources to the east of Bela-Bela (Warmbad). Its most important tributaries are the Olifantspruit and the Tobiasspruit. Other tributaries are the Klein Nyl, Middelfonteinspruit, Hessie-se-Water, De Wet Zyn Loop, Bad se Loop, Andriesspruit, Kotjie se Loop and the Dorpspruit.

The Nyl plain becomes seasonally flooded and is full of reeds and other aquatic plants. It is known as Nylsvlei, from the word vlei usually applied to intermittent lakes, for the main course in its midst flows northeastwards very slowly. Further on it bends northwards as the north-leaning gradient of the river tilts to a sharper angle. Finally the Nyl becomes the Mogalakwena River shortly before the Dorps River joins the right bank of the stream.

=== Dams in the basin ===
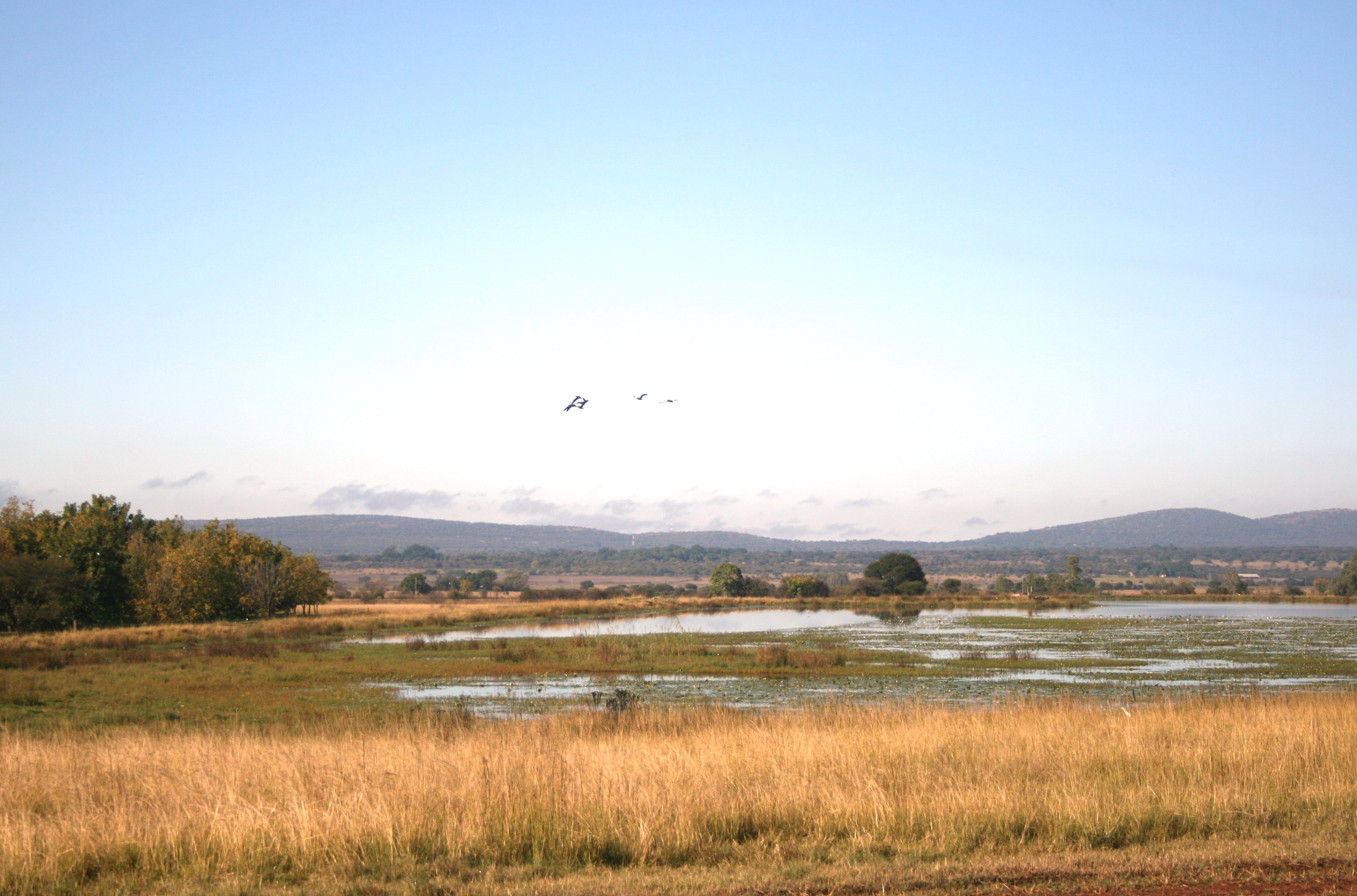
A submerged area beside the river that attracts water birds

The Donkerpoort Dam is a dam on the Klein Nyl near Modimolle, former Nylstroom. The reservoir is a popular fishing spot.

== Ecology ==
The flood-plain of the Nyl, also known as the Nyl pan (Afrikaans: Nylsvlei), is a seasonal wetland, for the basin of the Mogalakwena is affected by a five-year rain cycle in which the river is virtually dry for five years, followed by another five years in which there is sufficient water flow.

It is one of the largest single ecosystems in South Africa providing a haven for aquatic birds. This flood-plain is now the site of the Nylsvley Nature Reserve, a Ramsar wetland of international importance.

== See also ==
- Nylsvley Nature Reserve
- Drainage basin A
- List of rivers of South Africa
