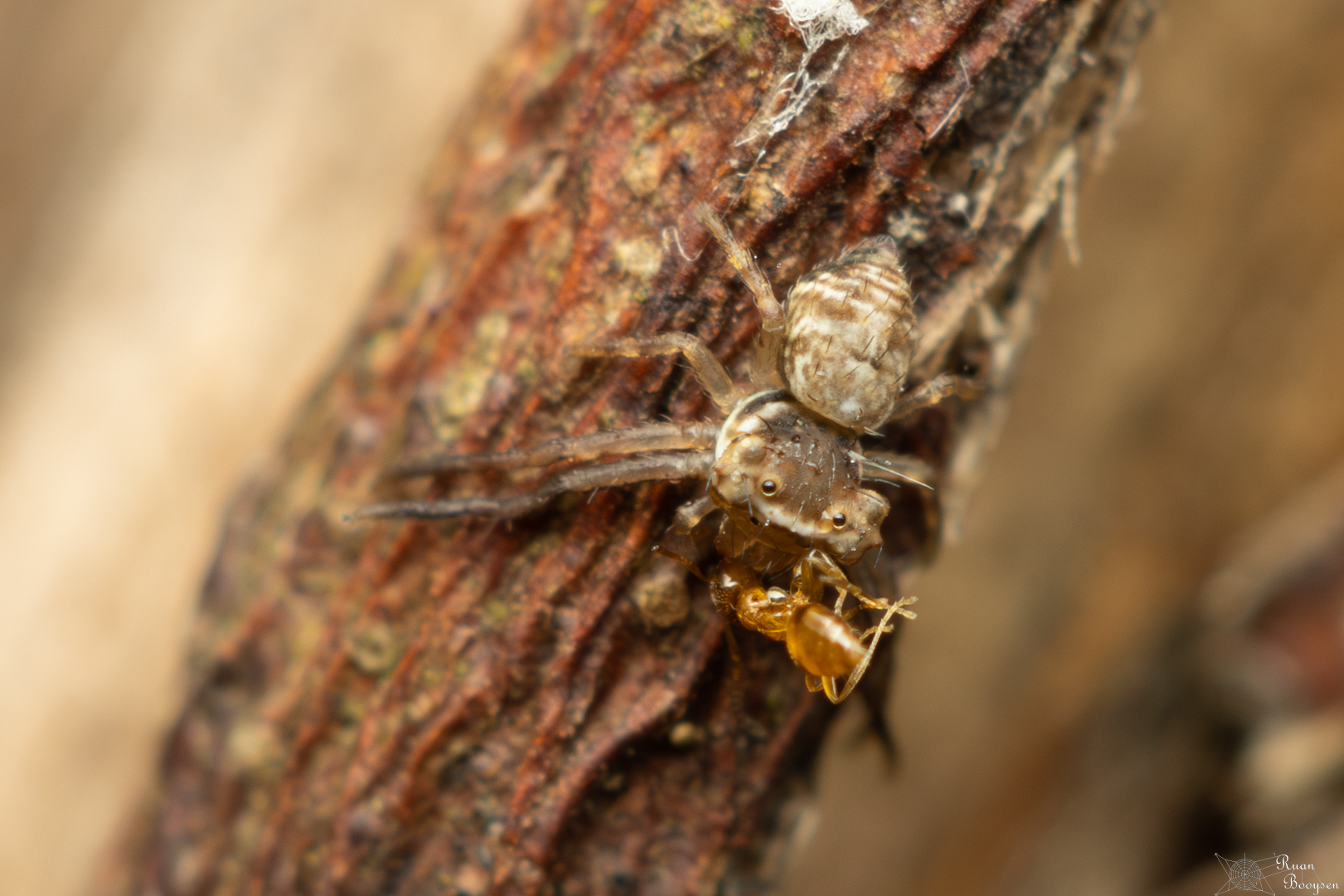

Scientific classification
- Kingdom: Animalia
- Phylum: Arthropoda
- Subphylum: Chelicerata
- Class: Arachnida
- Order: Araneae
- Infraorder: Araneomorphae
- Family: Thomisidae
- Genus: Pherecydes
- Species: P. ionae

Binomial name
- Pherecydes ionae Dippenaar-Schoeman, 1980

= Pherecydes ionae =

Iona Pherecydes Crab Spider

Species of spider

Pherecydes ionae is a species of spider in the family Thomisidae. It is found in Africa and is commonly known as Iona Pherecydes crab spider.

== Distribution ==
Pherecydes ionae is found in Tanzania and South Africa.

In South Africa, it is known from the Eastern Cape, KwaZulu-Natal, and Limpopo. Localities include Hogsback, and Kloof.

== Habitat and ecology ==
Pherecydes ionae inhabits the Savanna and Forest biomes at altitudes ranging from 1146 to 1307 m. These are tree and grass dwellers.

== Conservation ==
Pherecydes ionae is listed as Least Concern due to its wide geographic range in Africa.

== Taxonomy ==
The species was originally described by Dippenaar-Schoeman in 1980 from Tanzania. Only the female is known.
