= Mogalakwena River =

Mogalakwena
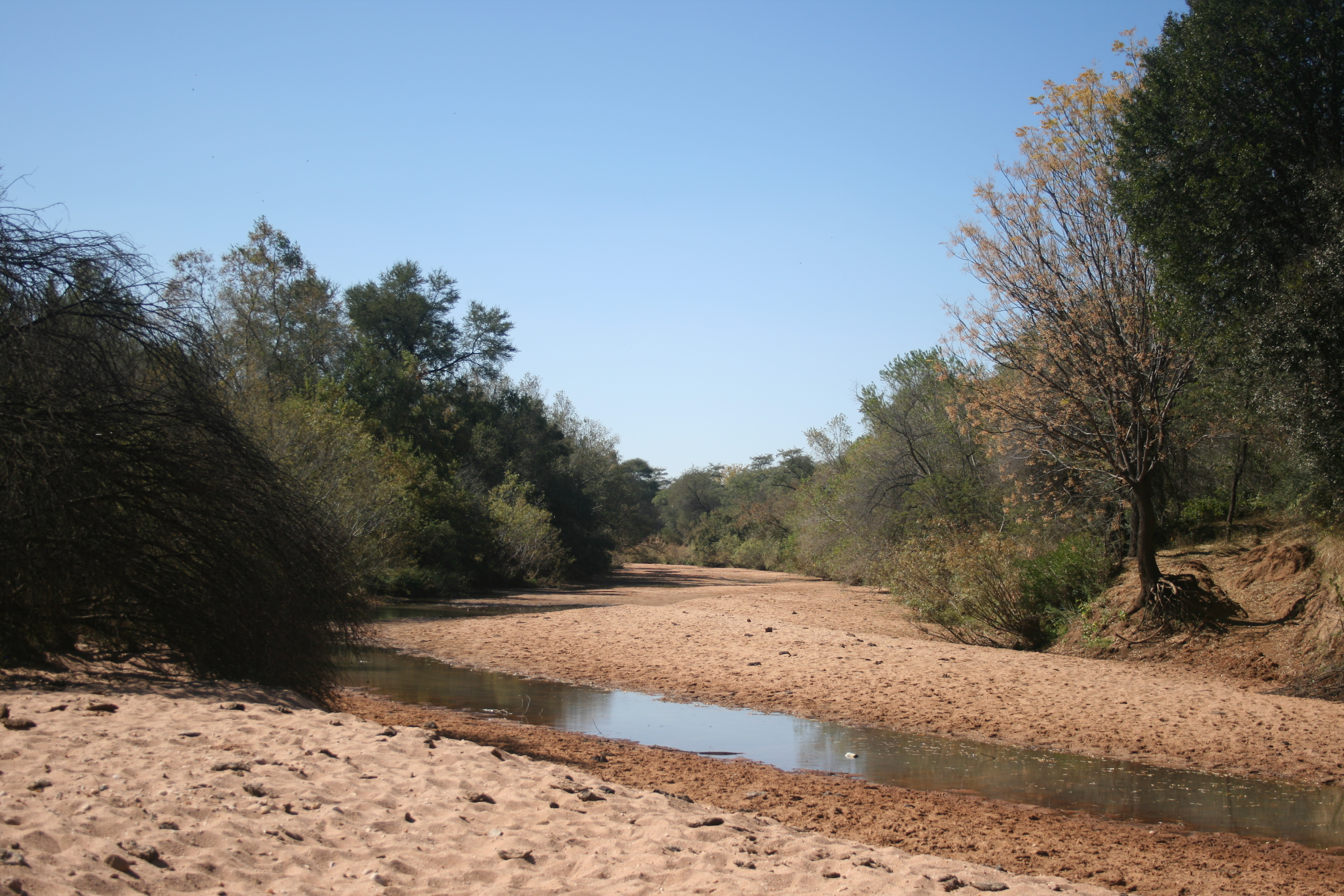
- View of the sandy river bed in winter, near Magagamatala in northern Limpopo

- Location of the Mogalakwena River mouth
- Etymology: Meaning "fierce crocodile", from bogale or mogale, 'fierce' and kwena, 'crocodile' in the Tswana language

Location
- Country: South Africa
- State: Limpopo Province

Physical characteristics
- Source
  - coordinates: 24°16′25″S 28°58′37″E
  - elevation: 1,060 m (3,480 ft)
- Source confluence: Nyl River
  - location: South of confluence with Dorps River
- Mouth
  - location: Limpopo River, South Africa/Botswana border
  - coordinates: 22°27′24″S 28°55′25″E
  - elevation: 634 m (2,080 ft)
- Basin size: 19,195 km^{2} (7,411 sq mi)

The Mogalakwena River (Afrikaans: Mogalakwenarivier) is one of the main watercourses in Limpopo Province, South Africa. It is also a major tributary of the Limpopo River.

== Course ==
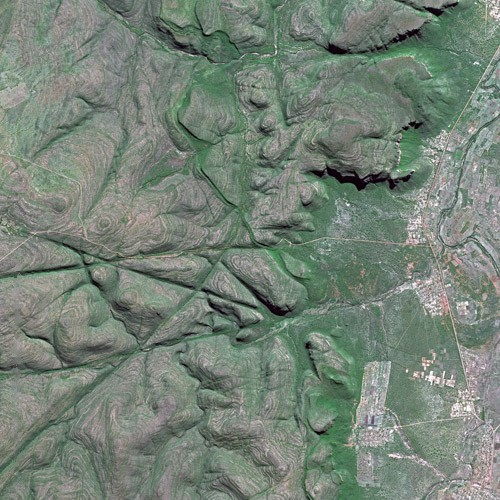
SPOT Satellite photograph of the northern Waterberg showing at right the Mogalakwena River at 900 m. The villages alongside are Kabeane, Jakkalskuil and Ga-Molekwa (also called Galakwena) in Mogalakwena Local Municipality.

This river flows from the eastern side of the Waterberg Massif northeastwards through a wide flooded plain as the Nyl River. After about 80 km it starts bending northwards and its name changes to Mogalakwena. Then it flows across Limpopo Province until it joins the right bank of the Limpopo River at the South Africa/Botswana border.

The basin of the Mogalakwena is affected by a five-year rain cycle in which the river is virtually dry for five years, followed by another five years in which there is sufficient water flow. In 2016 the river had the least water in living memory, and villagers at Bokwidi had to dig in the sand to find water for their livestock.

There are 8 dams in the Mogalakwena basin. The highest concentration of hippopotamus in the Limpopo River is found between the Mokolo and the Mogalakwena Rivers.

== Tributaries ==
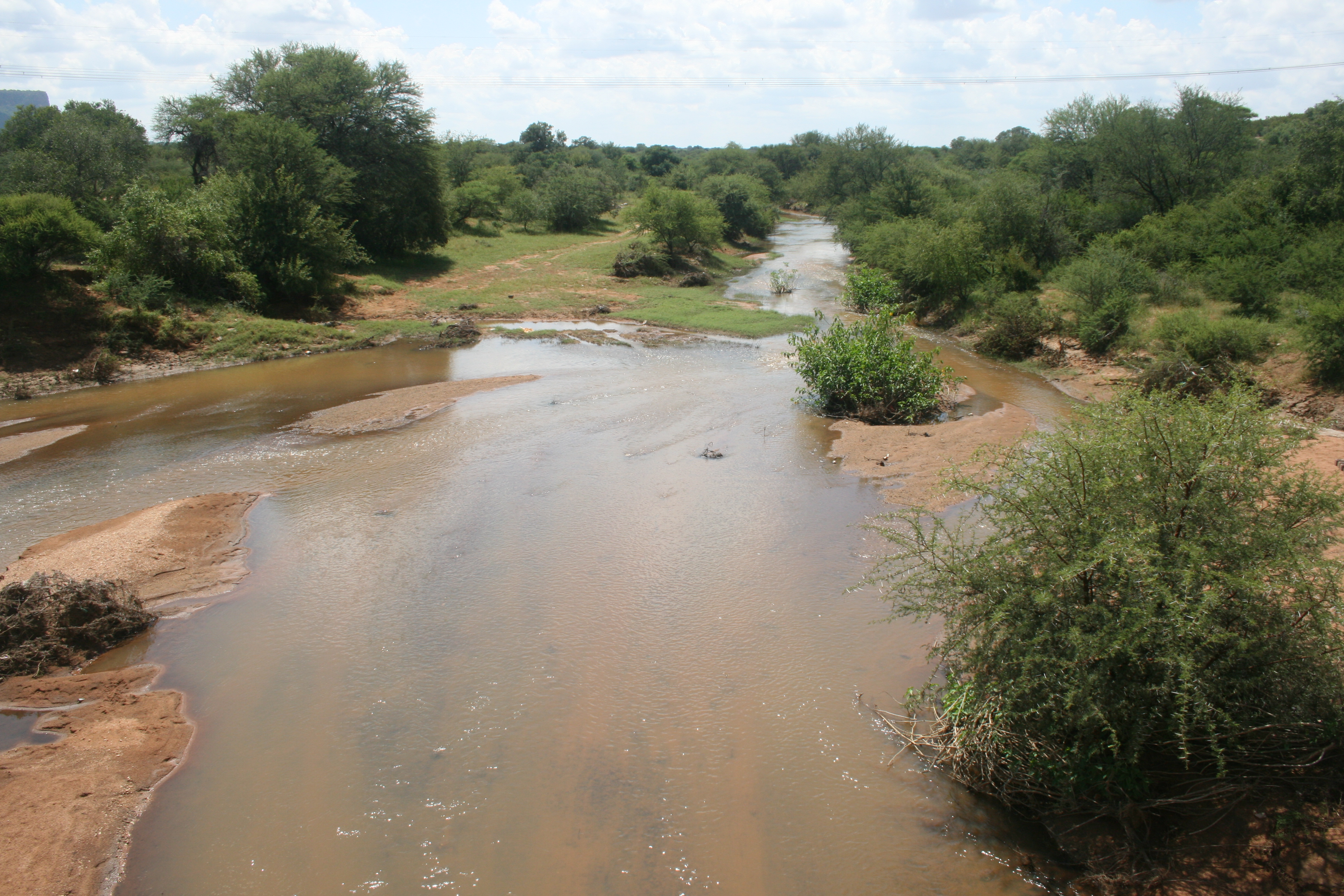
The Little Mogalakwena (or Motse) River near Marken, Limpopo, is a left bank tributary of the Mogalakwena

The upper or southernmost stretch of the Mogalakwena River is the Nyl River, known for its wide flood-plain, also known as the Nyl pan (Afrikaans: Nylsvlei). The flood-plain is partially conserved in the Nylsvley Nature Reserve, and incorporates one of the largest single ecosystems in South Africa for aquatic birds.

The Mothlakole, Dorps, Rooisloot (right), Groot Sandsloot (right), Witrivier (right), Sterk (left), Mokamolo (left), Little Mogalakwena (left), Matlalane (right), Seepabana (right), Ga-Mamoleka (right), Pholotsi and Thwathwe are some of the tributaries of the Mogalakwena.

== Dams in the basin ==
- Glen Alpine Dam
- Doorndraai Dam, in the Sterk River
- Combrink Dam, in the Dorps River
- Donkerpoort Dam, in the Klein Nyl River

== Ethnic groups ==
The region has a rich heritage of Bantu and San chiefdoms. with the Transvaal Ndebele of Langa people comprising the largest ethnic group in the catchment of the river, followed by the bapedi of Puka-Phokela, Lebelo kgomo and Tsonga people Nkuna. Lastly The Kattea, a little-known nomadic people akin to the San, used to live in the lands alongside the lower Mogalakwena. By 1905 however, they had been reduced to a few hundred individuals.

== See also ==
- Mogalakwena Local Municipality
- Drainage basin A
- List of rivers of South Africa
- List of reservoirs and dams in South Africa
