= Modimolle =

Modimolle Nylstroom
- Location within Limpopo Location within South Africa Location within Africa
- Coordinates: 24°42′00″S 28°24′22″E
- Country: South Africa
- Province: Limpopo
- District: Waterberg
- Municipality: Modimolle–Mookgophong

Area
  - Total: 74.9 km^{2} (28.9 sq mi)

Population (2011)
  - Total: 8,671
  - Density: 116/km^{2} (300/sq mi)

Racial makeup (2011)
  - Black African: 44.3%
  - Coloured: 1.1%
  - Indian/Asian: 0.7%
  - White: 53.6%
  - Other: 0.3%

First languages (2011)
  - Northern Sotho: 27.4%
  - Afrikaans: 53.2%
  - English: 4.1%
  - Tsonga: 3.8%
  - Other: 11.5%
- Time zone: UTC+2 (SAST)
- Postal code (street): 0510
- PO box: 0510
- Area code: 014

Modimolle, also known as Nylstroom, is a town located near the southern edge of the Waterberg Massif in Limpopo province, South Africa. It is a medium-sized town that focuses primarily on agriculture and farming (citrus, grapes and cattle) as well as wildlife and tourism. Nylstroom is also located approximately 135 kilometres (84 miles) north of Pretoria, South Africa's capital city.

The Waterberg Biosphere spreading north, a UNESCO designated Biosphere Reserve, contains approximately 15,000 square kilometres (5,792 square miles). Waterberg is the first region in the northern part of South Africa to be named as a Biosphere Reserve by UNESCO. The extensive rock formation was shaped by hundreds of millions of years of riverine erosion to yield diverse bluff and butte landform. The ecosystem can be characterised as a dry deciduous forest or Bushveld.

== History ==
In the 1860s, a group of Voortrekkers known as the Jerusalem Trekkers set off for the Holy Land. After discovering a wide river flowing northwards, they consulted the maps at the back of their Bibles and decided that it was the Nylrivier (Nile river). They called the stream Nyl River and settled the town and called it Nylstroom in 1866. After discovering what they believed to be a ruined pyramid, they were convinced that they had found the Nile. It was in fact, a natural hillock, known to the locals as Modimolle. In March 1866, the district of Waterberg was created out of some of the districts of Rustenburg and Zoutpansberg with a landdrost established in Nylstroom. A Dutch Reformed Church was built in 1889 and is the oldest church in South Africa north of Pretoria. It was also used as a hospital during the Second Boer War. The river is the Nyl River, a tributary of the Mogalakwena River.

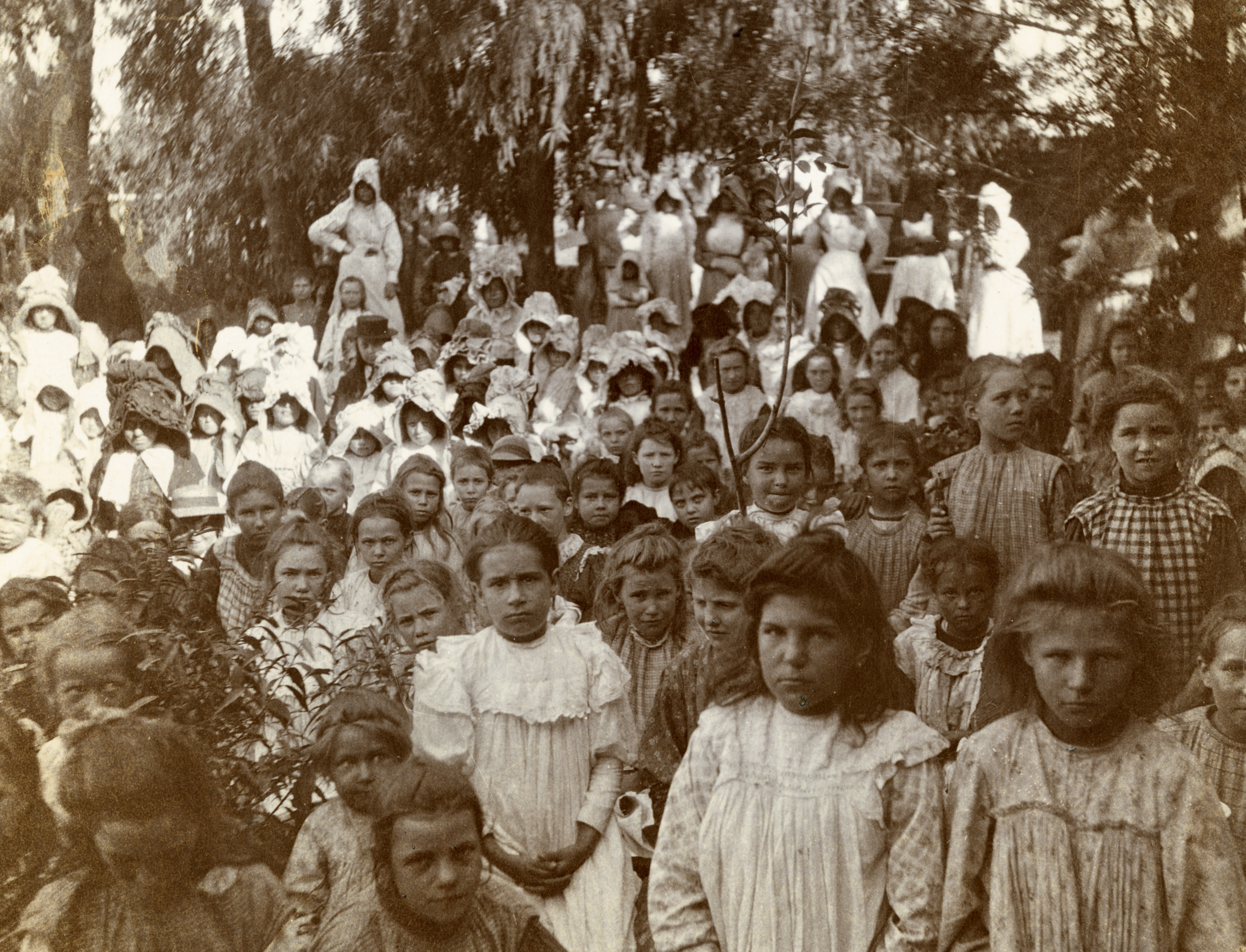
Boer women and children in the British concentration camp of Nystroom, c.1901

The first South African railway line reached Modimolle in 1898, connecting the town to Pretoria. During the Second Boer War, the British government operated a concentration camp in Modimolle, where Boer women and children where interned as part of the Lord Kitchener's scorched earth policy. 544 of those interned at the camp died of various causes before it was closed upon the conclusion of the war in 1902. Strijdom Huis (Strijdom House) was the primary residence of the 6th Prime Minister of South Africa, JG Strijdom, and is situated in Modimolle.

=== Name change ===
The South African government officially changed the name of the town to Modimolle in 2002. The name comes from the Sotho-Tswana phrase, Modimo o lle, meaning "the forefather's spirit has eaten", or "God has eaten".

Other numerous name changes include the renaming of both a municipal building and the town hall after Oliver Tambo, the library being renamed the Ruth First Memorial Library, as well as the renaming of several streets.

== Notable people ==
- John Edmond — Popular Folk Singer during the Rhodesian Bush War. Now living in Modimolle.
- Christiaan Beyers – Boer general, and Commandant-General of the Union Defence Force
- Carel Boshoff – Professor of theology and Afrikaner white nationalist
- Lucas Malan – Afrikaans academic and poet
- Eugène Marais – Poet, journalist, lawyer, naturalist and author
- Gerard Moerdijk – Architect
- Johannes Gerhardus Strijdom – 5th Prime Minister of South Africa
- Nelson Makamo – South African visual artist.
- Buti Manamela - Minister of Higher Education.
