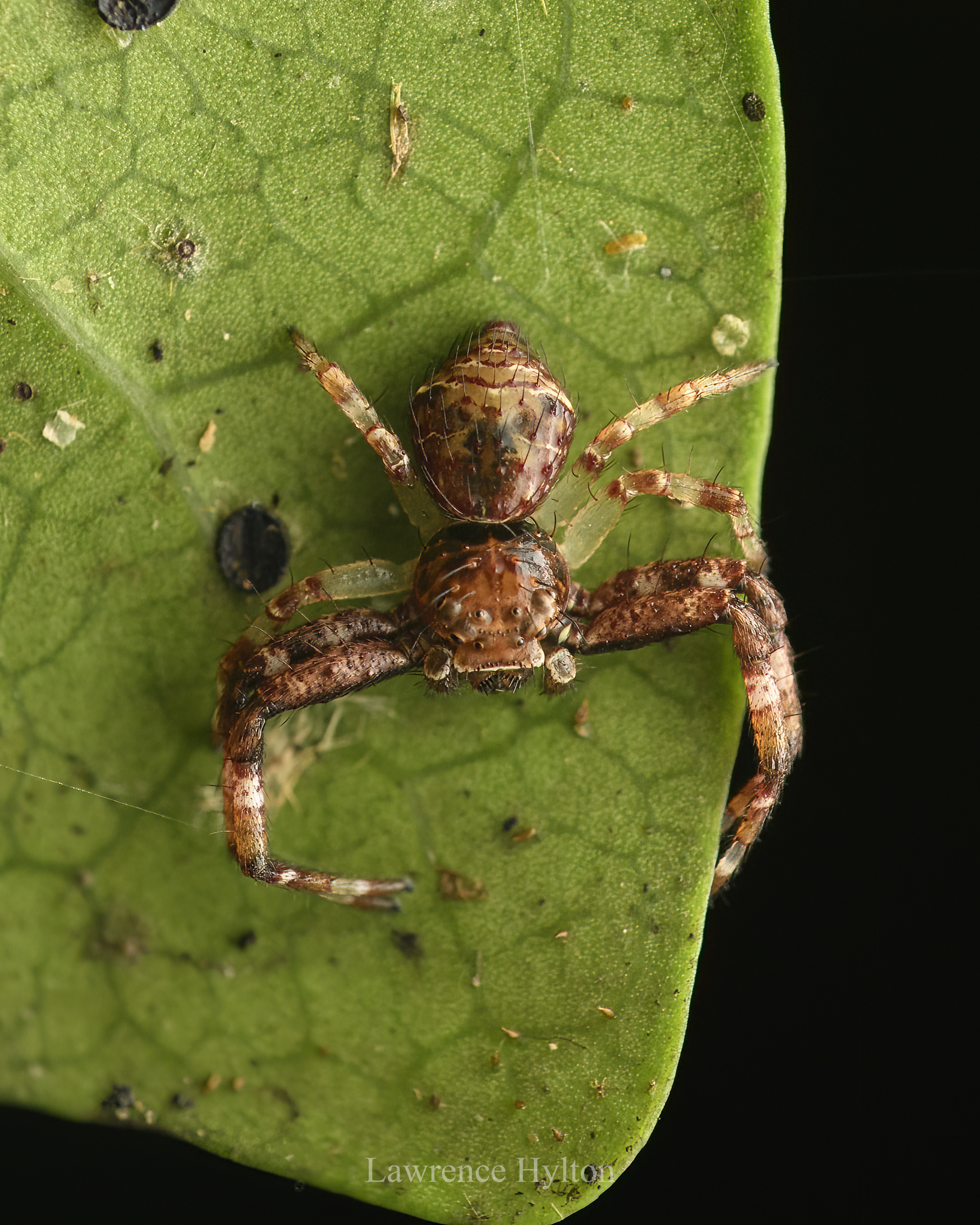
- from Hong Kong

Scientific classification
- Kingdom: Animalia
- Phylum: Arthropoda
- Subphylum: Chelicerata
- Class: Arachnida
- Order: Araneae
- Infraorder: Araneomorphae
- Family: Thomisidae
- Genus: Strigoplus
- Species: S. guizhouensis

Binomial name
- Strigoplus guizhouensis Song, 1990

= Strigoplus guizhouensis =

Species of spider

Strigoplus guizhouensis is a species of crab spider in the family Thomisidae. It is endemic to China.

== Etymology ==
The species name guizhouensis refers to Guizhou Province in China, where the type specimen was collected.

== Distribution ==
S. guizhouensis has been recorded from Guizhou, Yunnan, Guangxi, and Fujian provinces in China.

== Description ==
The female of S. guizhouensis has a body length of 5.40–7.17 mm, with the cephalothorax measuring 2.34 mm in length and 2.52 mm in width, and the opisthosoma measuring 3.69 mm in length and 3.24 mm in width. The carapace is blackish-brown in color with pale coloration on the head region and scattered dark brown setae. The thoracic region has a central transverse pale yellow stripe with two shorter oblique pale yellow stripes on each side.

The male was first described in 2006 and has a body length of 3.13 mm, with the cephalothorax measuring 1.36 mm in length and 1.50 mm in width, and the abdomen measuring 1.90 mm in length and 1.46 mm in width. The carapace is blackish-brown centrally with a reddish-brown middle section. Both sexes have a leg formula of 2143.

The species exhibits sexual dimorphism typical of crab spiders, with females being considerably larger than males.

== Habitat ==
S. guizhouensis has been collected from various locations in southwestern and southern China, suggesting it inhabits diverse environments within its range.
