= Glen Alpine Dam =

- Interactive map of Glen Alpine Dam
- Official name: Glen Alpine Dam
- Location: Bochum, Limpopo South Africa
- Coordinates: 23°11′30″S 28°41′5″E
- Opening date: 1968
- Operators: Department of Water Affairs and Forestry

Dam and spillways
- Type of dam: gravity & earth-fill
- Impounds: Mogalakwena River
- Height: 28 m
- Length: 1171 m

Reservoir
- Creates: Glen Alpine Dam Reservoir
- Total capacity: 18 900 000 m^{3}
- Catchment area: 11 289 km^{2}
- Surface area: 465.3 ha

Glen Alpine Dam is a combined gravity and earth-fill type dam located on the Mogalakwena River, near Ga-Mankgodi, Bochum Limpopo, South Africa. It was established in 1968 and its main purpose is for irrigation use. The hazard potential of the dam has been ranked as high (3).

== See also ==
- List of reservoirs and dams in South Africa
- List of rivers of South Africa
