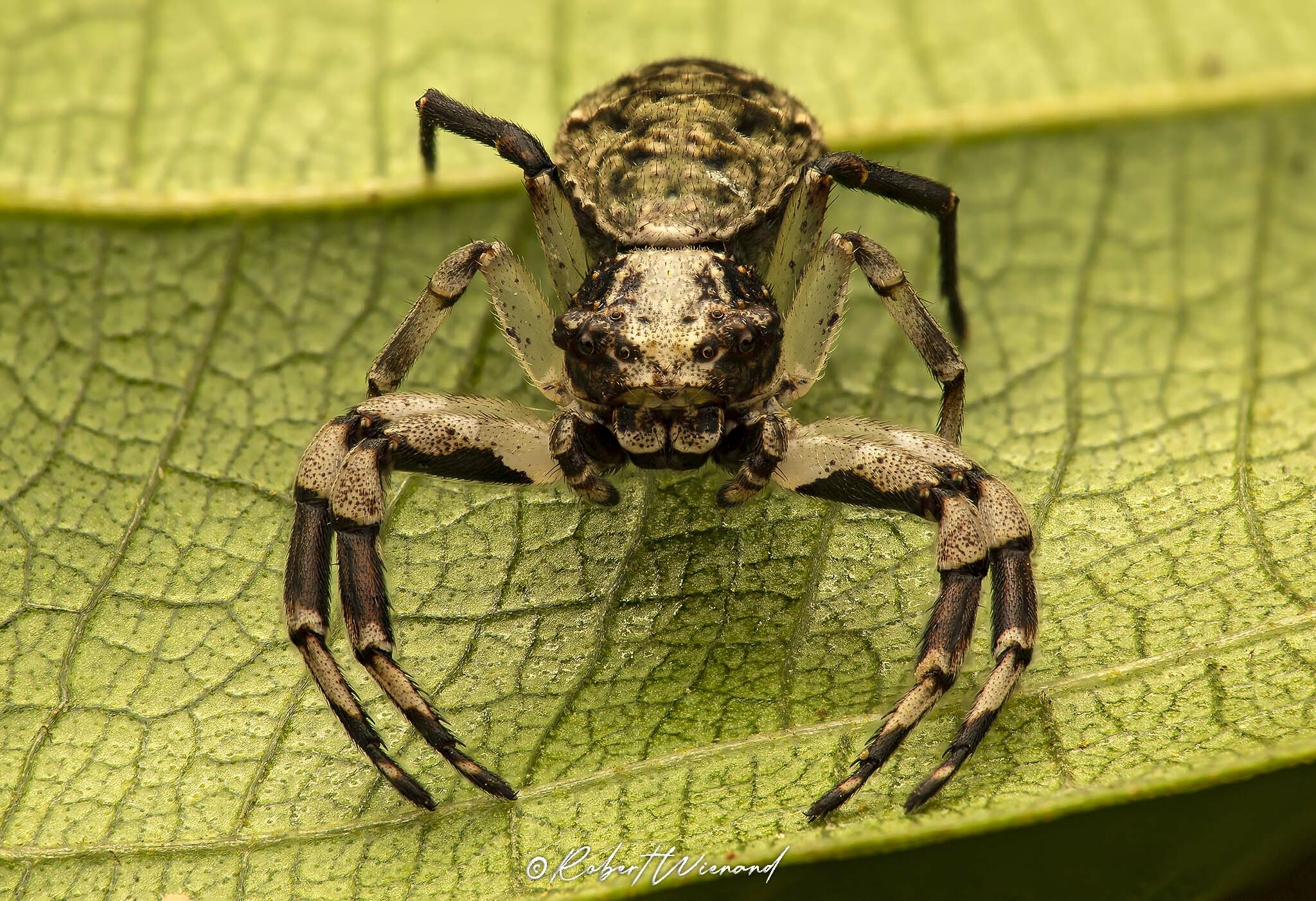

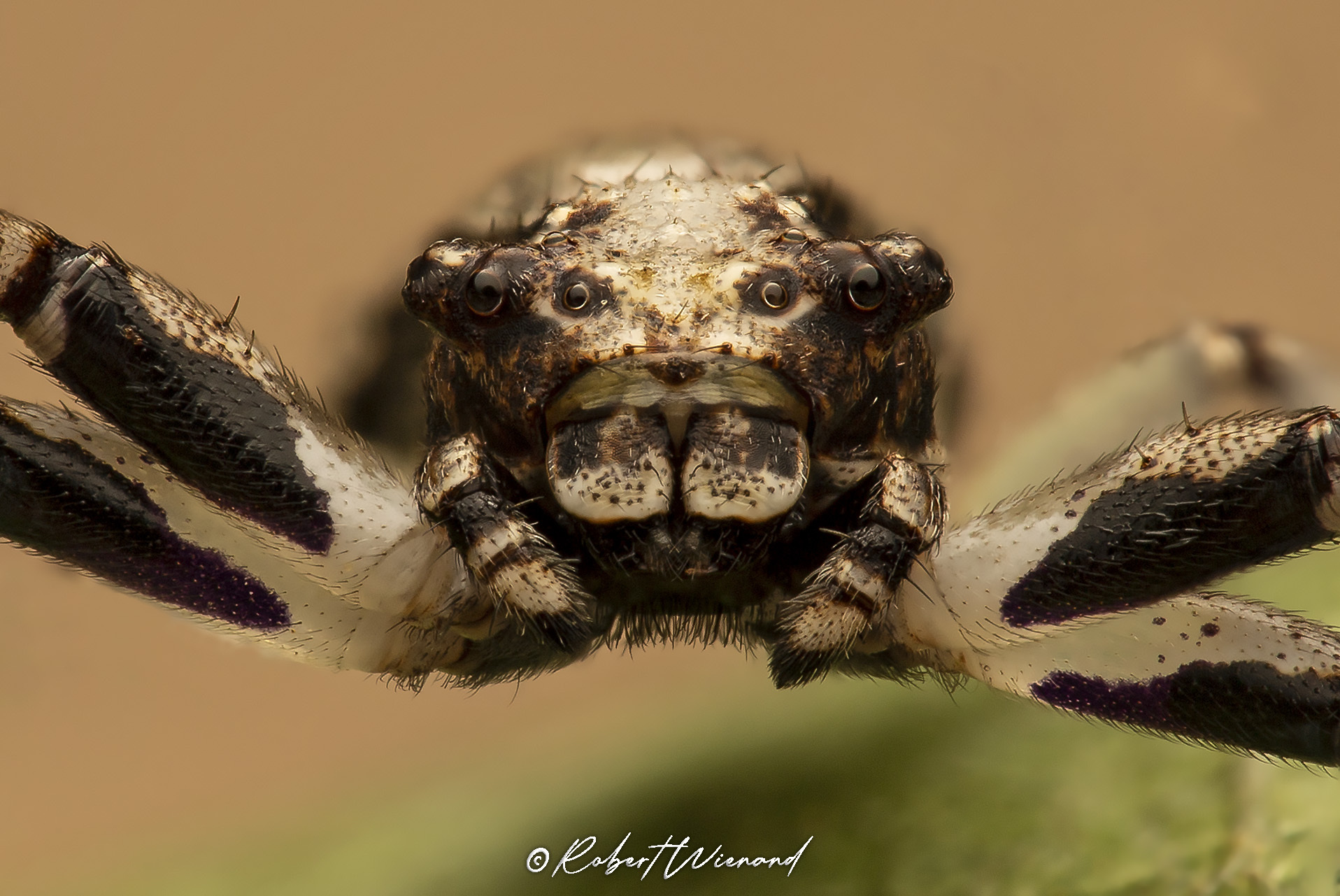

Scientific classification
- Kingdom: Animalia
- Phylum: Arthropoda
- Subphylum: Chelicerata
- Class: Arachnida
- Order: Araneae
- Infraorder: Araneomorphae
- Family: Thomisidae
- Genus: Pherecydes
- Species: P. carinae

Binomial name
- Pherecydes carinae Dippenaar-Schoeman, 1980

= Pherecydes carinae =

Carina's Pherecydes Crab Spider

Species of spider

Pherecydes carinae is a species of spider in the family Thomisidae. It is endemic to South Africa and is commonly known as Carina's Pherecydes crab spider.

== Distribution ==
Pherecydes carinae is found in South Africa.

In South Africa, the species is known from KwaZulu-Natal and Mpumalanga. Notable locations include Pongola, Ndumo Game Reserve, Tembe Elephant Park, Isandlwane Nature Reserve, and several sites within Kruger National Park.

== Habitat and ecology ==
Pherecydes carinae inhabits the Savanna biome at altitudes ranging from 44 to 1068 m.

These tree and grass dwellers have been sampled from Vachellia tortilis trees in KwaZulu-Natal.

== Conservation ==
Pherecydes carinae is listed as Least Concern by the South African National Biodiversity Institute due to its wide geographical range. It is protected in several reserves including Tembe Elephant Park, Ndumo Game Reserve, Isandlwane Nature Reserve, and Kruger National Park.

== Taxonomy ==
The species was originally described by Dippenaar-Schoeman in 1980. Both sexes are known.
