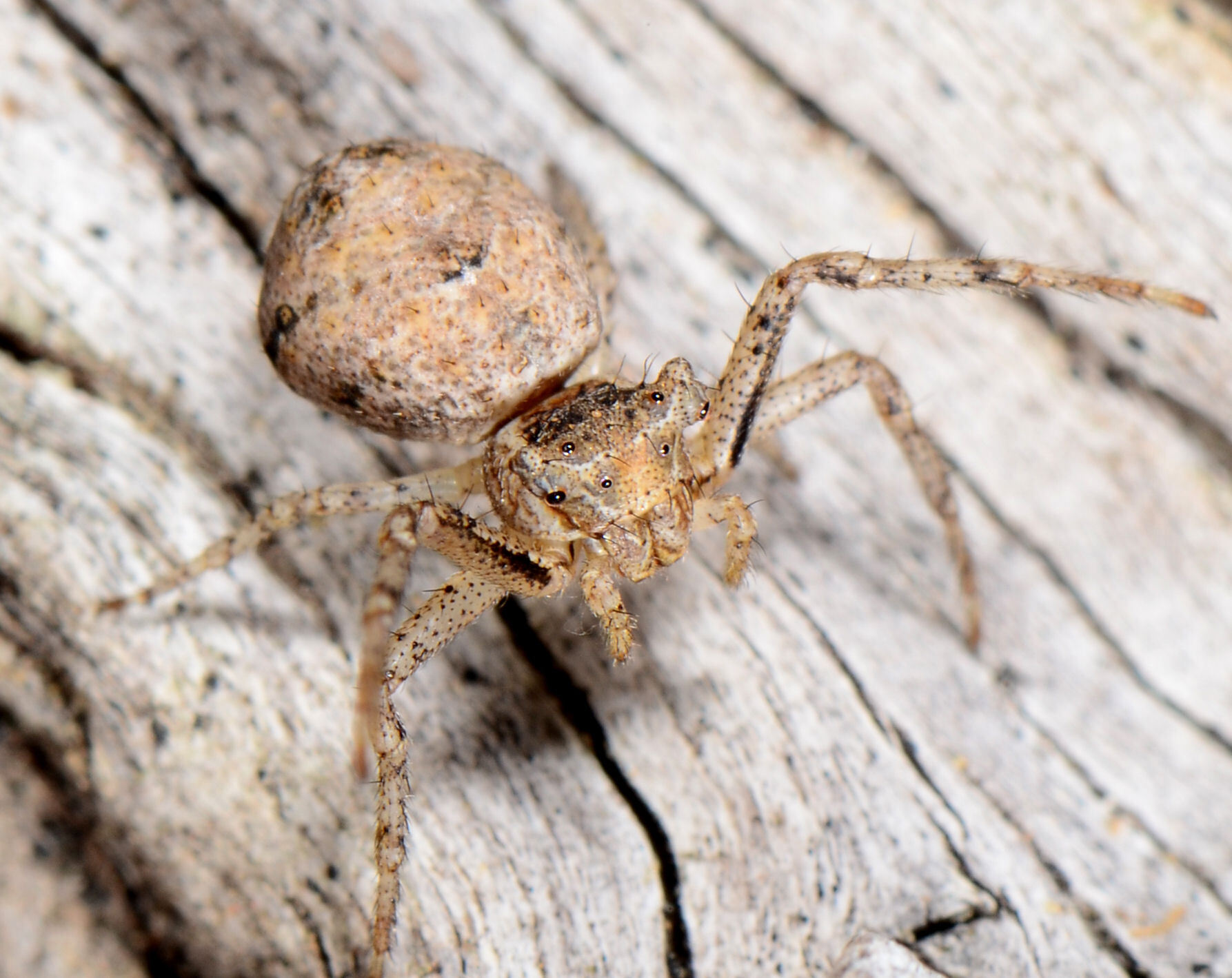
- female Pherecydes tuberculatus
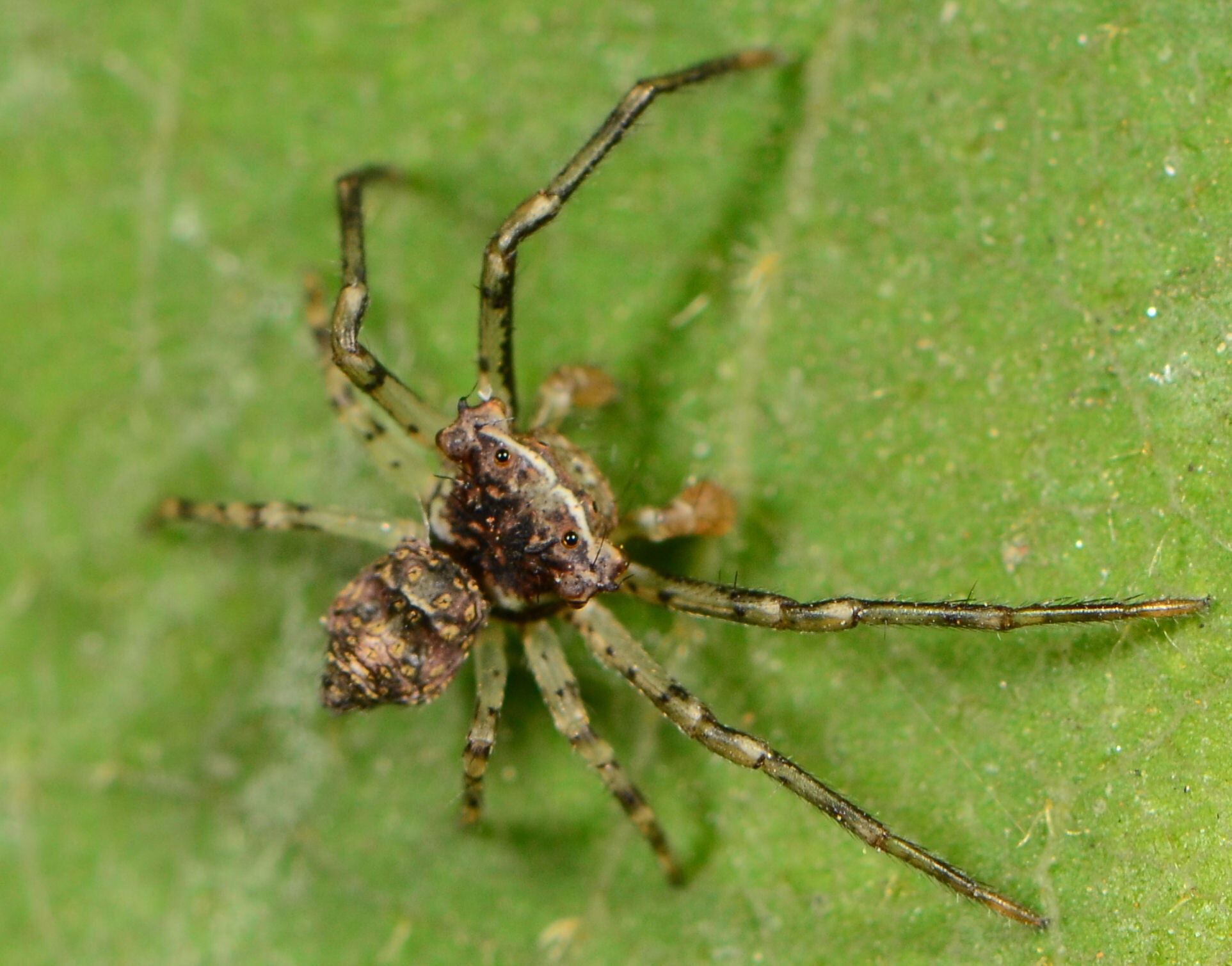
- male P. nicolaasi

Scientific classification
- Kingdom: Animalia
- Phylum: Arthropoda
- Subphylum: Chelicerata
- Class: Arachnida
- Order: Araneae
- Infraorder: Araneomorphae
- Family: Thomisidae
- Genus: Pherecydes; O. Pickard-Cambridge, 1883

Type species
- P. tuberculatus O. Pickard-Cambridge, 1883

Species
- 7, see text

= Pherecydes (spider) =

Genus of spiders

Pherecydes is a genus of African crab spiders first described by Octavius Pickard-Cambridge in 1883.

== Description ==
Members of Pherecydes are small spiders measuring 3 to 5 mm.

Colour varies between species with the carapace ranging from yellowish-brown mottled with dark brown to whitish-grey mottled with black, the abdomen from cream faintly mottled with brown to grey faintly mottled with black, and the legs from cream to fawn mottled with black and brown.

Legs I and II have numerous dark brown and yellow patches on the femora and patellae dorsally, while the tibiae and metatarsi are lightly banded.

The genus is recognised by the two lateral eyes situated on a common elevated area that is widely truncated on top, though this varies between species.

== Life style ==
These spiders have been sampled from trees and shrubs.

== Species ==
As of October 2025, this genus includes seven species and one subspecies:

- Pherecydes carinae Dippenaar-Schoeman, 1980 – South Africa
- Pherecydes ionae Dippenaar-Schoeman, 1980 – Tanzania, South Africa
- Pherecydes livens Simon, 1895 – Tunisia
- Pherecydes lucinae Dippenaar-Schoeman, 1980 – South Africa
- Pherecydes nicolaasi Dippenaar-Schoeman, 1980 – South Africa
- Pherecydes tuberculatus O. Pickard-Cambridge, 1883 – South Africa, Lesotho (type species)
- Pherecydes zebra Lawrence, 1927 – Burkina Faso, Tanzania, Namibia, Mozambique, South Africa
  - P. z. tropicalis Millot, 1942 – Burkina Faso
