= Jakkalskuil =

- Location within Limpopo Location within South Africa
- Coordinates: 23.819°S 28.611°E
- Country: South Africa
- Province: Limpopo
- District: Waterberg
- Municipality: Mogalakwena

Racial makeup

First languages
- Time zone: UTC+2 (SAST)
- PO box: 0633

Jakkalskuil is a village in the Mogalakwena Local Municipality of the Waterberg District Municipality of the Limpopo province in South Africa.

== Geography ==
The village is regarded as one of the villages that are situated in Bakenberg South of Mokopane. The village divided in three regions, Mookamedi which is named after Mookamedi Secondary School, Xawela where Sekanekamoyi Primary School and Jakkalskuil clinic are located, and Treseng.

== Course ==
Jakkalskuil community source water direct from one of the main watercourses, Mogalakwena River, in Limpopo, South Africa.

== Healthcare ==
- Jakkalskuil Clinic

== Schools ==
=== Primary ===
- Sekanekamoyi Primary school.

=== Secondary ===
- Mookamedi Secondary School
