= Bokwidi =

- Village
- Location within South Africa
- Coordinates: 23.8278938°S 28.6449888°E
- Country: South Africa

Bokwidi is a small village in the Waterberg District Municipality, Limpopo, South Africa. The settlement has a primary school situated in the northeast area.

Bokwidi village is currently under the traditional leadership of Ntona Ramasobana. The village has Senior Secondary school called Kolobe Ramasobana Senior Secondary School, named after Ntona Ramasobana.

There are several entertainment hubs in the village such as Bra Willy's tavern, Lembas tavern, Five Sisters, Sexychillas, Ivy's tavern and Nkhumane's tavern popularly known as Boxeng. In addition, there are also three legendary soccer teams, namely, Bokwidi Young Chiefs (a.k.a. BYC), Bokwidi Callies F.C (a.k.a. Maroma) and Bokwidi Celtics F.C (a.k.a. Selesele).

== See also ==
- Economy of South Africa
- History of South Africa
