= Nylsvley Nature Reserve =

Nature reserve in Limpopo Province, South Africa

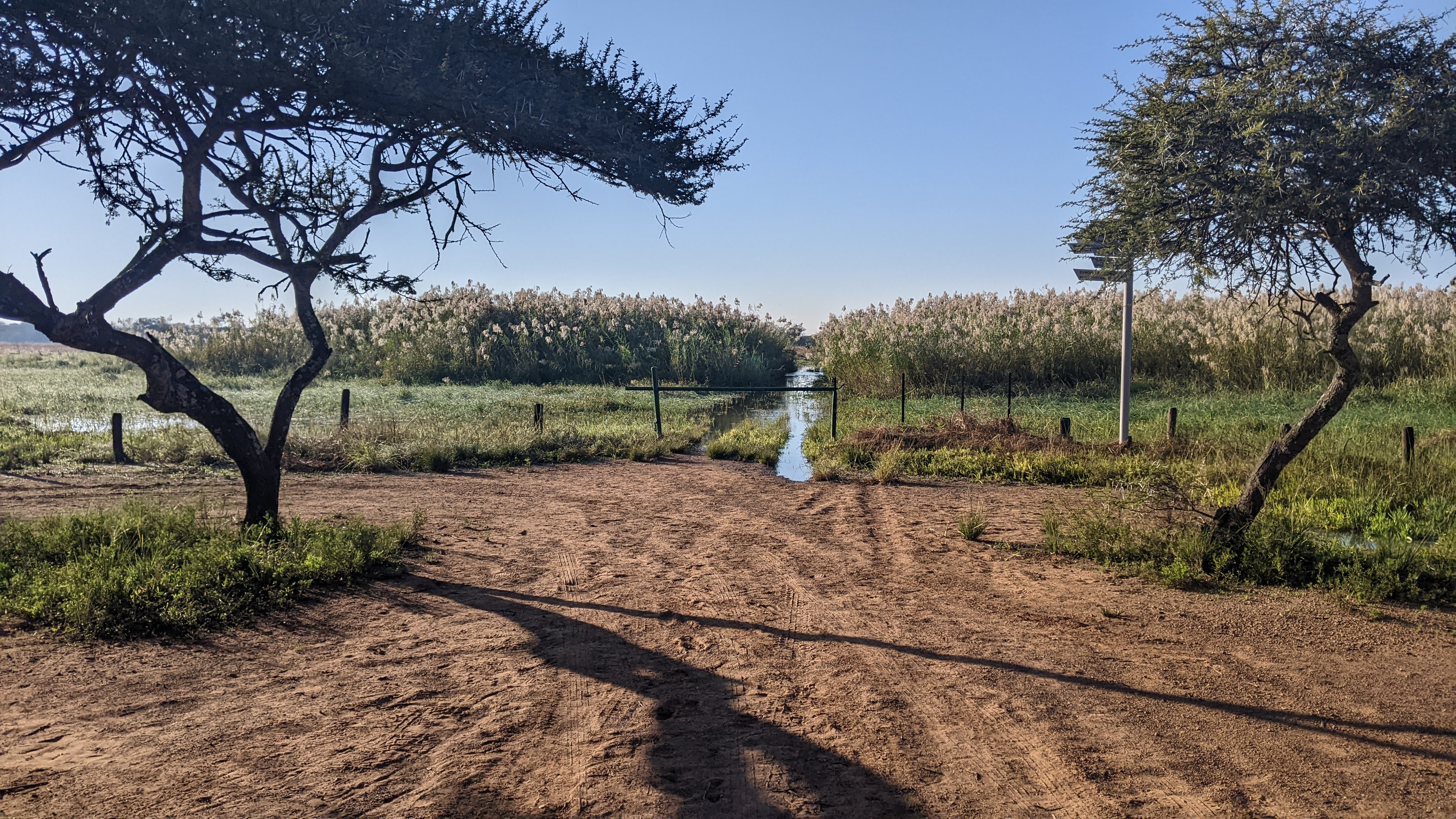
- Wetland with common reed
- Interactive map of Nylsvley Nature Reserve
- Location: Limpopo Province, South Africa
- Nearest city: Mookgophong
- Coordinates: 24°39′17″S 28°41′28″E
- Area: 40 km^{2} (15 mi^{2})
- Established: July 7, 1998; 27 years ago
- Administrator: Limpopo Department of Economic Development, Environment and Tourism
- Camp sites: Multiple

Ramsar Wetland
- Designated: 7 July 1998
- Reference no.: 952

Nylsvley Nature Reserve is a 40 km^{2} (15 mi^{2}) protected area, located on and beside the seasonally-inundated floodplain of the Nyl River, the uppermost section of the Mogalakwena which has a very shallow gradient. It is located near Mookgophong in the Limpopo Province of South Africa. The area has been declared a Ramsar wetland site because of its international conservation importance. The floodplain is made up of extensive reedbeds and grassveld surrounded by open woodland.

Situated in the upper catchment area of the Nyl River, and covering about 20% of the floodplain, the area boasts some 370 bird species – of which more than 100 are waterfowl – and during peak floods, over 80,000 birds are to be seen. The reserve is also home to roan antelope and tsessebe. The only stands of wild rice in South Africa, Oryza longistaminata, are to be found here.

The name 'Nylsvley' originated in vlei, a pan or seasonally flooded area, and in the word for "Nile". In the 1860s, a Voortrekker group of farmers saw a large flooded plain and a river flowing northwards and according to legend considered it to be the Nylrivier (Nile river).

== Pictures ==
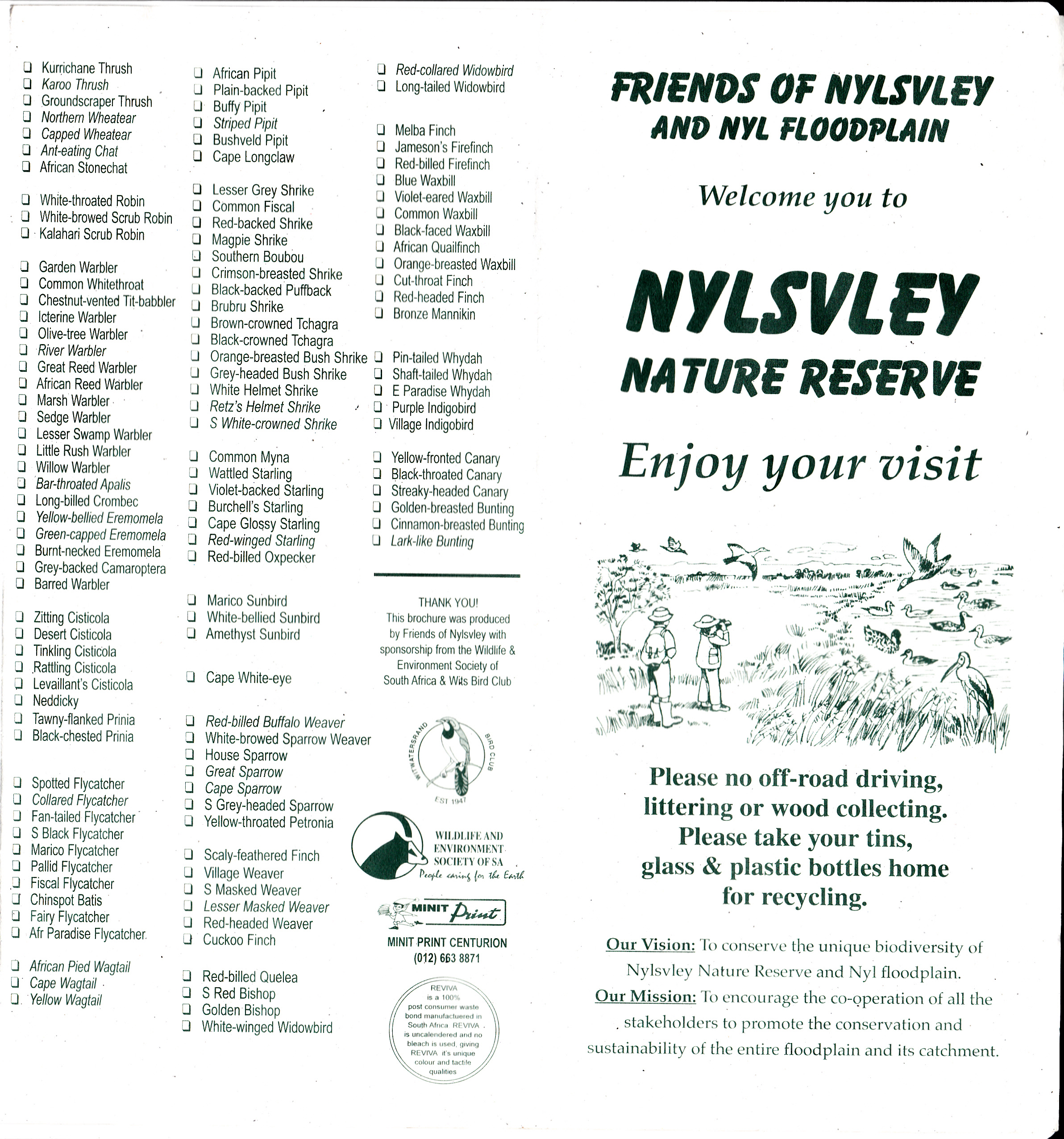
Nylsvley Brochure pg 1

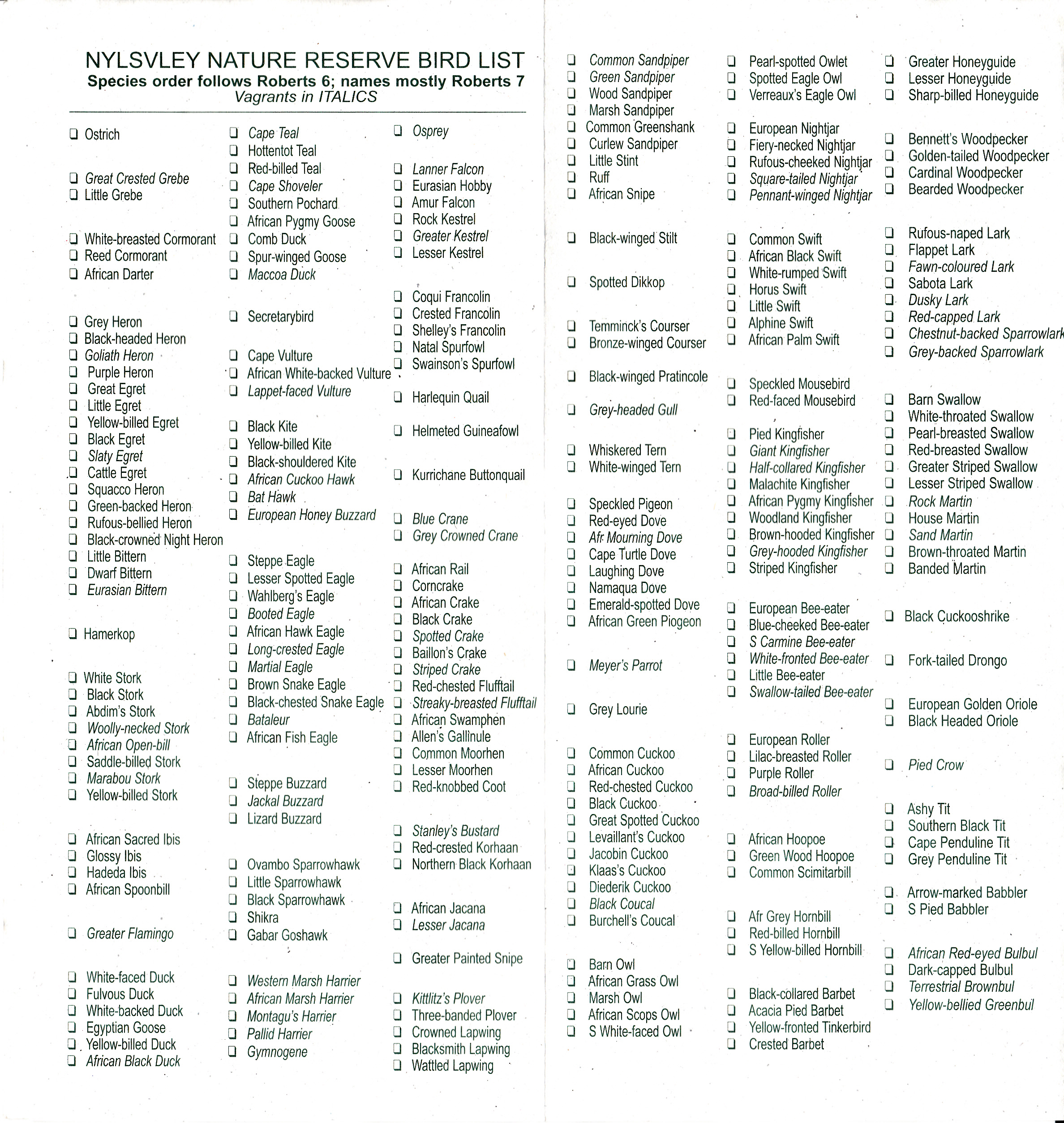
Nylsvley Brochure pg 2

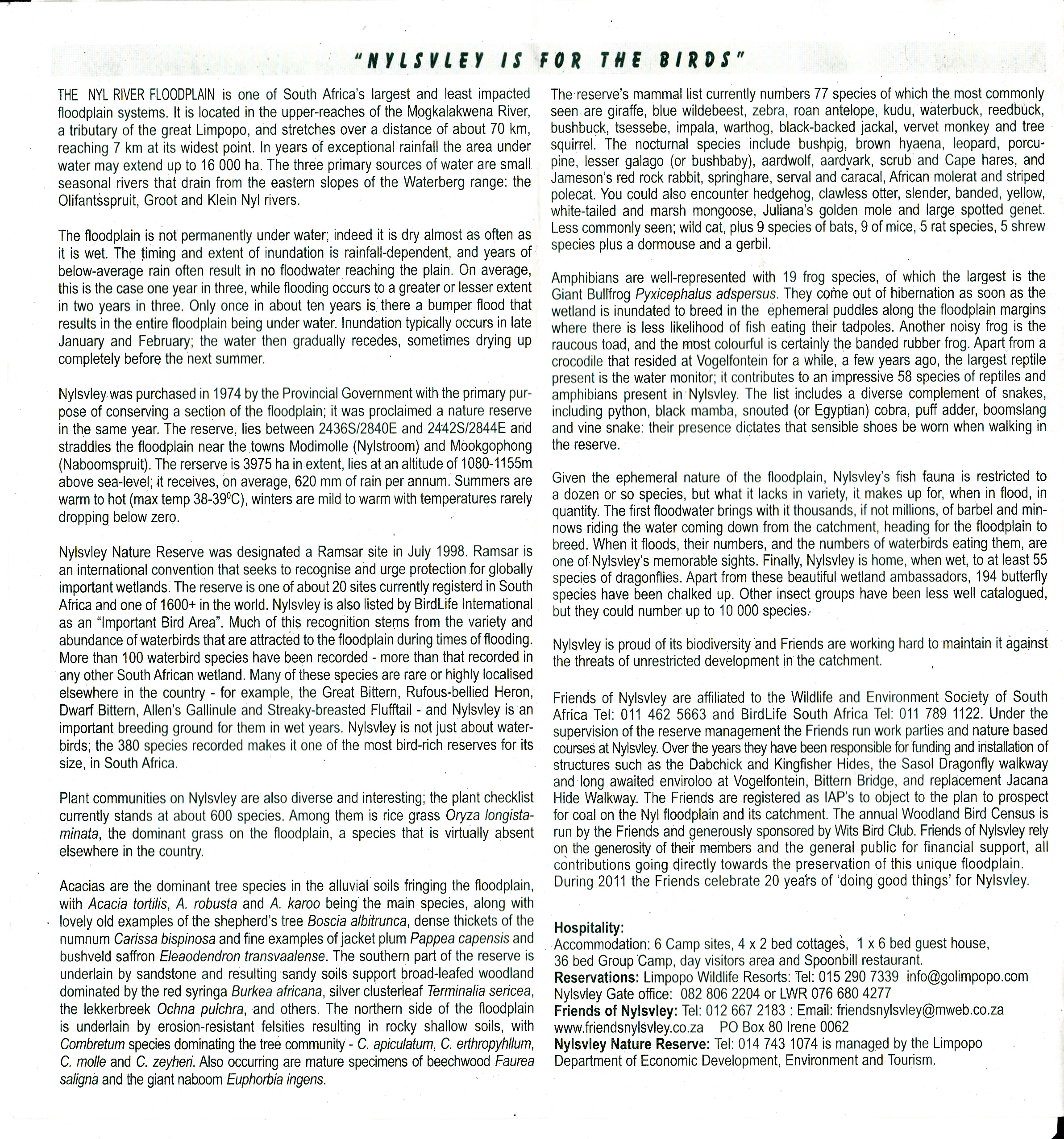
Nylsvley Brochure pg 3

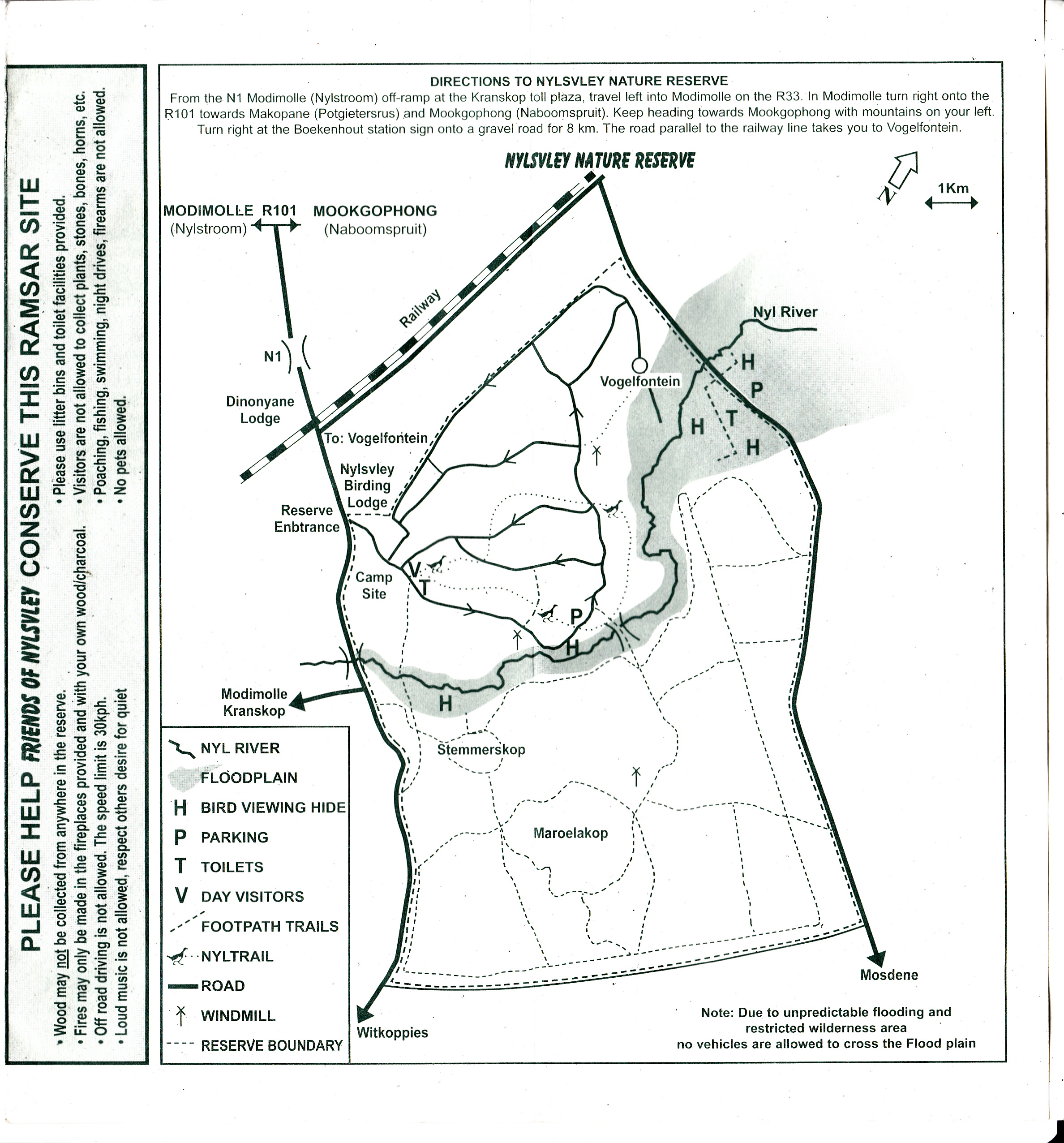
Nylsvley Brochure pg 4
