= Argun =

Argun may refer to:

- Argun (surname)
- Argun, Iran, a village in East Azerbaijan Province, Iran
- Argun, Chechen Republic, town in Chechen Republic, Russia
- Argun, Russia, several inhabited localities in Russia
- Argun (Caucasus), a river in Georgia and southern Russia
- Argun (Amur), a river in far eastern Russia and northeastern China
- Argun (mountain), a mountain in Ethiopia

== See also ==
- Arghun (c. 1258–1291), or Argun, ruler of the Mongol empire's Ilkhanate
- Arghun Aqa (before 1242–1278), Mongol noble
- Urgun, a town in Paktika Province, Afghanistan
- Argyn, a clan within the Kazakh ethnicity
- Medemia argun, flowering plant in the family Arecaceae
