= Sarah Monyamane =

South African politician

Sarah Monyamane MPL

Member of the Limpopo Provincial Legislature
- Incumbent
- Assumed office 22 May 2019

Personal details
- Citizenship: South Africa
- Party: African National Congress

Nkome Sarah Monyamane is a South African politician who has represented the African National Congress (ANC) in the Limpopo Provincial Legislature since 2019. She was formerly the Mayor of Mookgophong Local Municipality from 2011 to 2016.

== Political career ==
=== Mayor of Mookgophong Local Municipality ===
The ANC nominated her as its mayoral candidate after the 2011 local elections. Towards the end of her five-year mayoral term, in March 2016, the municipality was wracked with violent service delivery protests in which protesters called for her to resign as mayor. At least 22 people were arrested on public violence charges; several structures were set alight, including houses belonging to a councillor and to one of Monyamane's relatives; and one person was reportedly fatally shot.

In the 2016 local elections later that year, the ANC lost the mayoral seat in the municipality (newly amalgamated as Modimolle-Mookgophong Local Municipality) to the opposition Democratic Alliance and Monyamane was succeeded as mayor by Marlene van Staden, though she remained an ordinary local councillor.

=== Limpopo Provincial Legislature ===
She left the council in the 2019 general election when she was elected to her seat in the Limpopo Provincial Legislature, ranked 34th on the ANC's party list.

Monyamane was also a prominent member of the ANC's regional branch in Waterberg. In July 2018, she was elected as Deputy Regional Secretary of the branch, serving under Regional Secretary Jacob Moabelo and Regional Chairperson Morris Mataboge. Ahead of the party's next regional elective conference in 2022, the Sowetan reported that she was expected to stand for election as Regional Chairperson. However, when the conference took place in July 2022, she did not stand for the chairmanship and she was succeeded as Deputy Regional Secretary by Aaron Mokgehle.

=== ANC National Executive election ===
Later that year she was nominated to stand for election to the ANC's National Executive Committee; by number of branch nominations received, she was ranked 143rd of the top 200 nominees. However, when the party's 55th National Conference took place, she was not elected to the 80-member body.
