= Aeroflot Flight 418 =

1976 aviation accident

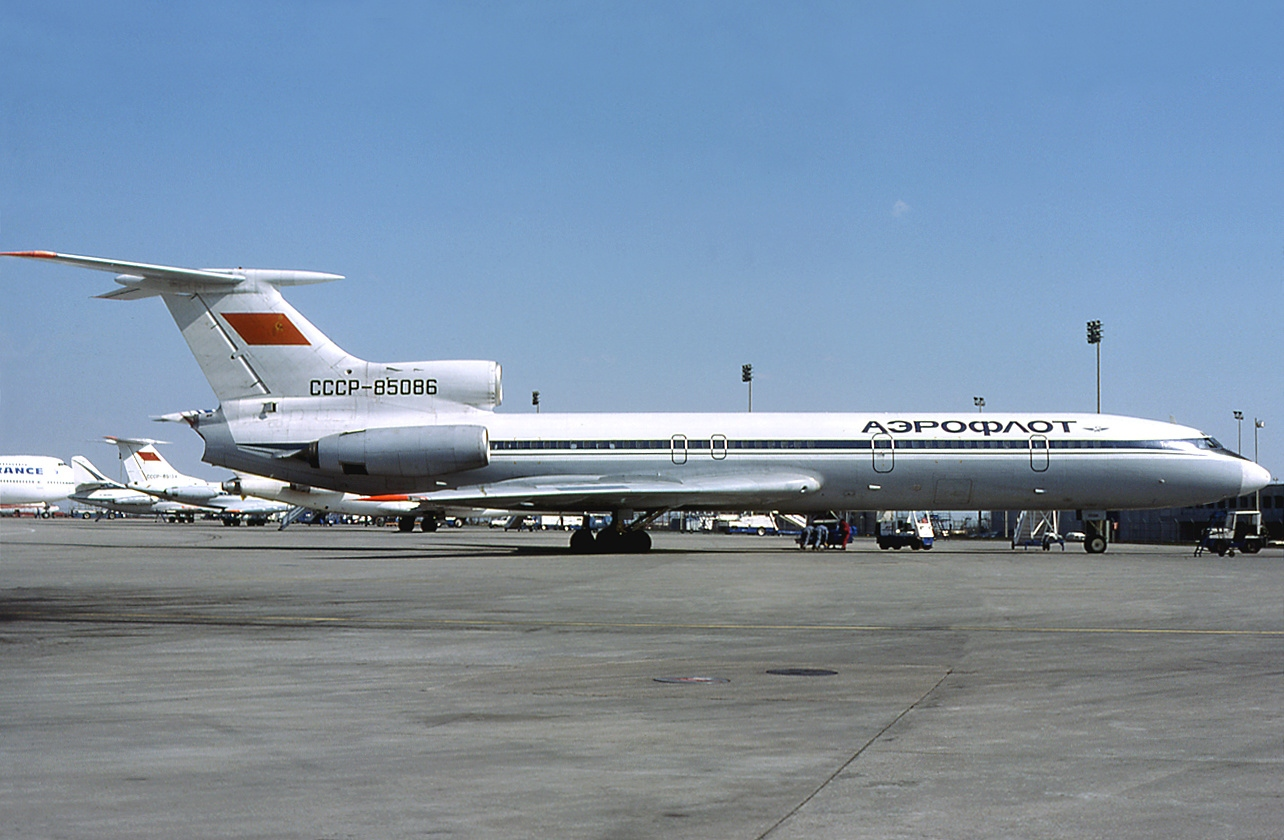
- An Aeroflot Tu-154, similar to the one involved in the accident.

Accident
- Date: 1 June 1976
- Summary: Inconclusive (possibly due to radar failure)
- Site: Mount San Carlos, Bioko, Equatorial Guinea; 3°30′N 8°42′E

Aircraft
- Aircraft type: Tupolev Tu-154A
- Operator: Aeroflot
- Registration: CCCP-85102
- Flight origin: Quatro de Fevereiro Airport, Luanda, Angola
- Stopover: Malabo International Airport, Bioko, Equatorial Guinea
- 1st stopover: N'Djamena International Airport, Chad
- Last stopover: Tripoli International Airport, Libya
- Destination: Sheremetyevo International Airport, Moscow, Soviet Union
- Occupants: 46
- Passengers: 36
- Crew: 10
- Fatalities: 46
- Survivors: 0

Aeroflot Flight 418 was an international passenger flight from Luanda to Moscow Sheremetyevo with three intermediate stops. On 1 June 1976, the Tupolev Tu-154A (CCCP-85102) operating the first leg of the flight, collided with Mount San Carlos of Bioko Island while en route. All 46 occupants on board were killed as a result of the crash.

An investigation made by the commission was unable to conclude the cause of the crash but stated that the crash was due to radar failure on board the aircraft.

== Aircraft ==
The aircraft involved, manufactured in 1975 at the Kuibyshev Aviation Plant, Samara, was a "brand new" Tupolev Tu-154A registered CCCP-85102 with MSN 75A102. At the time of the accident, the aircraft had accumulated 2,119 hours and 1,069 cycles.

== Passengers and crew ==
There were 36 passengers and 10 crew members on board the aircraft. (Note: On 4 June 1976, The Associated Press reported that there were 36 passengers and 10 crew members on board the aircraft.; On 12 June 1976, Flight International reported that there were 46 passengers and crew.; On 11 December 1976, Flight International reported that there were 42 passengers and 4 crew members.; In 1988, in his book Uncovering Soviet disasters: exploring the limits of glasnost, James E. Oberg wrote that there were 46 occupants on board the aircraft.; The Bureau of Aircraft Accidents Archives reported that there were 45 occupants in total, including 35 passengers and 10 crew members.) The 36 passengers included 32 Angolans, (Note: On 16 June 1976, Reuters reported that were 36 Angolans and 13 Russians onboard while on 1 June 2020, Russian Planet reported that there were 31 Angolan passengers.) 20 of whom were wounded soldiers going to the Soviet Union for treatment and the rest were mostly students, one Hungarian and three Soviets.

There were 10 crew members on board the flight, including four Soviet flight attendants. The flight crew was described as "experienced" by Russian Planet.

== Description ==
The aircraft was en route from Quatro de Fevereiro Airport to Malabo International Airport when it struck a mountain 750 metres (2,460 ft) high at Bioko, Equatorial Guinea. All 42 passengers and 4 crew perished.

== Investigation ==
The cause of the accident could not be determined, but the investigation commission suspected a possible failure of the MSRP-12 radar on the aircraft may have led the crew to be unaware of their position.

== See also ==
- Aeroflot accidents and incidents
- Aeroflot accidents and incidents in the 1970s
