= Leucadendron comosum subsp. homaeophyllum =

Conservation status
- Critically Endangered (IUCN 3.1)

Scientific classification
- Kingdom: Plantae
- Clade: Tracheophytes
- Clade: Angiosperms
- Clade: Eudicots
- Order: Proteales
- Family: Proteaceae
- Genus: Leucadendron
- Species: L. comosum
- Subspecies: L. c. subsp. homaeophyllum

Trinomial name
- Leucadendron comosum subsp. homaeophyllum (Meisn.) I.Williams

Subspecies of plant

Leucadendron comosum subsp. homaeophyllum, the Villiersdorp ridge-cone conebush, is a flowering shrub and subspecies of Leucadendron comosum, belonging to the genus Leucadendron and forming part of the fynbos biome. The species is endemic to the Western Cape where it occurs in the Stettynskloof Mountains and Du Toitskloof Mountains. The shrub was considered extinct but rediscovered in 2002.

The shrub grows up to 1.7 m tall and dies after burning but the seeds survive. The shrub flowers in December. The seeds are stored in a conebush on the female plant and only fall to the ground when the flower has ripened and are dispersed by the wind, the seeds have wings. The plant is unisexual and there are separate plants with male and female flowers, which are pollinated by small beetles. The plant grows mainly in mountainous areas in sandstone soil at altitudes of 600 to 1 000 m.
