= Marlene van Staden =

South African politician (1981–2023)

Mayor of the Modimolle–Mookgophong Local Municipality
- In office 23 August 2016 – 8 June 2023
- Preceded by: Office established
- Succeeded by: Aaron Sechele Sebolai

Personal details
- Born: Marlene Vermaak; 2 February 1981 Empangeni, Natal Province, South Africa
- Died: 8 June 2023 (aged 42) Groenkloof, Pretoria, Gauteng, South Africa
- Party: Democratic Alliance
- Spouse: Hannes van Staden
- Children: 2
- Education: University of Pretoria (BCom); University of South Africa (PGCE, BComHon)

Marlene van Staden (née Vermaak; 2 February 1981 – 8 June 2023) was a South African politician who was the mayor of the Modimolle–Mookgophong Local Municipality from 2016 to 2023. She was a member of the Democratic Alliance.

== Early life and education ==
Van Staden was born on 2 February 1981 in Empangeni in the Natal Province. She and her family moved to the town of Vaalwater in Limpopo in 1989. Van Staden matriculated from Nylstroom High School (Afrikaans: Hoërskool Nylstroom) in Modimolle and went on to study at the University of Pretoria where she obtained a Bachelor of Commerce (BCom) in Tourism Management. She later graduated from the University of South Africa with a Post-Graduate Certificate in Education (PGCE) and a BCom Honours degree in Business Management, specialising in the field of Financial Management.

== Mayoral career ==
=== First term as mayor ===
Composition of the municipal council of the Modimolle–Mookgophong municipality following the 2016 elections: African National Congress: 13 seats Economic Freedom Fighters: 6 seats Democratic Alliance: 7 seats Freedom Front Plus: 2 seats

Van Staden was recruited to join the Democratic Alliance by senior party member Désirée van der Walt. In the 2016 local government elections, no party won a majority of seats on the municipal council of the newly amalgamated Modimolle–Mookgophong Local Municipality. At the inaugural council meeting on 23 August 2016, Van Staden, a newly elected DA councillor, was elected as the inaugural mayor of the municipality with the support of the Economic Freedom Fighters and the Freedom Front Plus councillors. She had won the mayoral vote with 17 out of 28 votes cast, while the candidate from the African National Congress received only 11 votes. After the result of the mayoral vote was announced, cheers erupted from the public gallery and some vuvuzela blasts were heard.

In August 2017, the DA called on the Public Protector to investigate expenditure by the former ANC administration in the now-dissolved Mookgophong Local Municipality, after the office of the mayor of the Modimolle–Mookgophong municipality found six irregular transactions valued at R684,298 by the office of the former mayor of the Mookgophong municipality.

In late-May 2018, the provincial government placed the municipality under administration due to the municipality's financial crisis and it being unable to pay workers' salaries and service providers. Also, in May 2018, Eskom announced that it would be implementing rolling blackouts in the municipality with effect from 28 June 2018 due to municipality's debt of close to R250 million to the power utility. Van Staden approached the provincial government to help the municipality. The municipality then successfully lodged an application for a stay of legal proceedings against it in the Limpopo High Court. A court order was then granted in terms of section 152 of the Municipal Finance Management Act, 56 of 2003, which meant that Eskom could no longer implement rolling blackouts.

On 10 August 2018, forensic auditors arrived at the municipality to audit the municipality's finances. Van Staden welcomed this development. The Limpopo provincial government received the report in February 2019 but did not release it until September 2019. After the report was released, the DA responded by saying it would lay criminal charges against the former municipal manager, Ombali Sebola, and two service providers following a recommendation by the report. Van Staden said that the municipality would initiate disciplinary proceedings against the municipality's acting Chief Finance Officer, Makgitla Lekalakala and the Revenue Manager, Jackson Sithole.

On 27 August 2018, EFF leader Julius Malema said that the party wanted to remove Van Staden as mayor of the municipality. In November 2018, the EFF and ANC both filed a motion of no confidence in Van Staden. She also received a letter from the provincial Executive Council, in which it stated its intention to disband the municipal council and call for new elections in terms of section 139(1)(c) of the Constitution.

In July 2020, Van Staden endorsed interim DA leader John Steenhuisen's campaign to become DA leader for a full term, ahead of the DA Federal Congress. Steenhuisen was elected party leader for a full term at the congress.

=== Second term as mayor ===
Composition of the municipal council of the Modimolle–Mookgophong municipality after the 2021 elections: African National Congress: 14 seats Democratic Alliance: 7 seats Economic Freedom Fighters: 4 seats Freedom Front Plus: 3 seats

In the run-up to the local government elections on 1 November 2021, Van Staden was announced as the DA's mayoral candidate for the municipality. In the election, the ANC increased their support, but not enough to win an outright majority on the council. It won 49.83% of the vote or 14 seats on the 28-seat council, which meant that it was still a hung council. The DA, EFF and FF Plus won the remainder of the seats. It was unclear which party could lead a coalition. The first council meeting on 19 November 2021 collapsed because the ANC councillors did not attend it, which caused the council to not have a quorum. The second council meeting on 22 November 2021 was postponed after the election for the council speaker ended in a 14–14 stalemate. The third council meeting on 23 November 2021 collapsed after the ANC councillors disrupted council proceedings after the speaker's vote ended in a tie for the second time. At the fourth council meeting on 29 November, the ANC's Sinah Langa was elected as council speaker in a 15–13 vote. The election for the mayor ended in a 14–14 tie between Van Staden and ANC councillor Aaron Sebolayi.

The council convened for the fifth time on 2 December 2021 to elect new leadership. The election for the mayor once again ended in a 14–14 tie between Van Staden and Sebaloyi. Thereafter, it was decided that a R1 coin toss would determine the winner of the mayoral election. The coin toss went in Van Staden's favour and she was re-elected as mayor of the municipality. Van Staden said that she was shocked that she was re-elected through a coin toss and said that other measures could have been used to break the stalemate but all parties agreed on a coin toss.

After the Modimolle-Mookgophong municipality collected nearly R1 million in one day in March 2022, in the wake of threatening to cut off electricity to government buildings as a result of the non-payment of municipal bills, Van Staden said that it was necessary and that "the municipality cannot function without money and the municipality cannot provide better services without money".

Van Staden stood for provincial leader of the DA at the party's provincial conference on 27 May 2023, but lost to current Member of Parliament Lindy Wilson.

== Personal life ==
Van Staden was married to Hannes. They had two sons, Luan and Dian.

=== Illness and death ===
Van Staden was diagnosed with stage 4 breast cancer in September 2022 and received chemotherapy. She underwent a double mastectomy on 19 April 2023. Follow-up tests showed no signs of cancer. On 17 May 2023, she was admitted to hospital in Polokwane with viral meningitis. The cancer had spread and she was admitted to the Mary Potter Oncology Centre in Groenkloof in Pretoria in late-May 2023 where she died on 8 June 2023, at the age of 42.
