= List of ultras of Africa =

This is a list of all the ultra prominent peaks (with topographic prominence greater than 1,500 metres) in Africa. Also shown is Mount Catherine in Sinai, Egypt which is not geographically part of Africa. Not listed here are the 5 Ultras of the Canary Islands and Madeira which near the African Coast but listed under Europe.

== Atlas Mountains ==
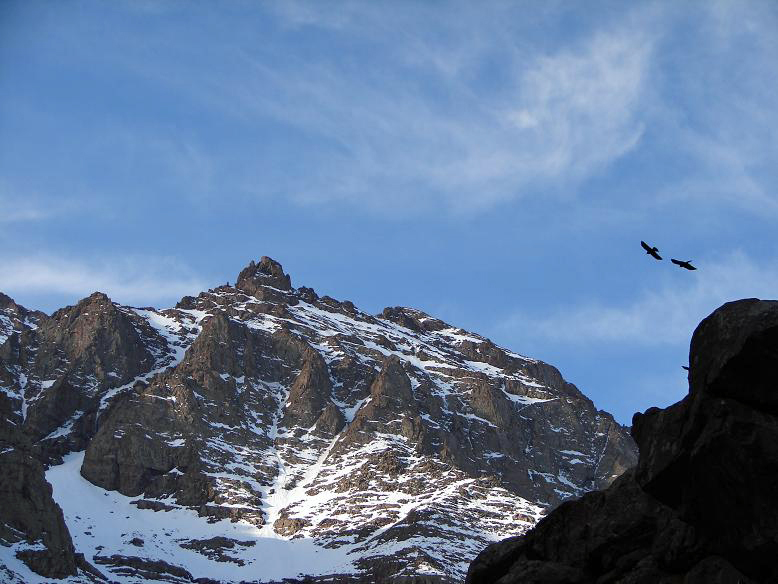
Jbel Toubkal, Morocco

No	Peak	Country	Elevation (m)	Prominence (m)	Col (m)
1	Toubkal	Morocco	4,167	3,755	412
2	M'Goun	Morocco	4,071	1,904	2167
3	Tidirhine (Rif)	Morocco	2,456	1,901	555
4	Lalla Khedidja	Algeria	2,308	1,720	588
5	Jbel Bou Naceur	Morocco	3,340	1,642	1698
6	Djebel Chélia	Algeria	2,328	1,612	716
7	Jbel Igdet	Morocco	3,615	1,609	2006

== Mountain ranges of the Sahara ==
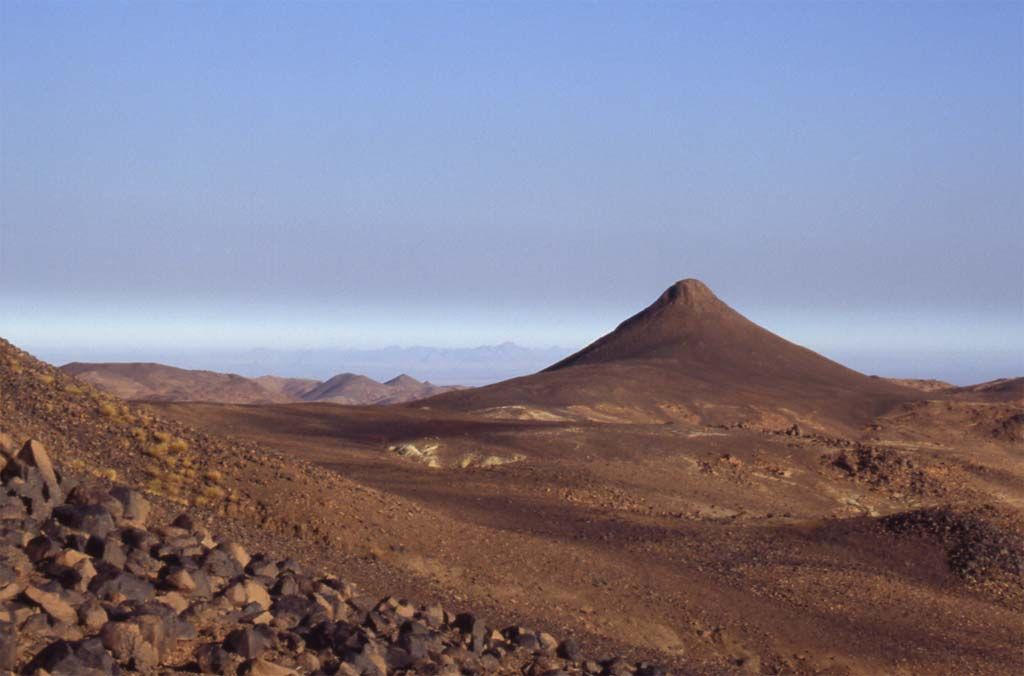
Mount Tahat, Algeria

No	Peak	Country	Elevation (m)	Prominence (m)	Col (m)
1	Emi Koussi	Chad	3,445	2,934	511
2	Deriba Caldera	Sudan	3,042	2,512	530
3	Mount Tahat	Algeria	2,908	2,328	580
4	Toussidé	Chad	3,315	1,593	1722

== Egypt ==
No	Peak	Country	Elevation (m)	Prominence (m)	Col (m)
(-) (Note: Located in the Sinai Peninsula, which is geographically a part of Asia)	Mount Catherine	Egypt	2,629	2,404	225
1	Shaiyb al-Banat	Egypt	2,187	1,787	440

== Cape Verde islands ==
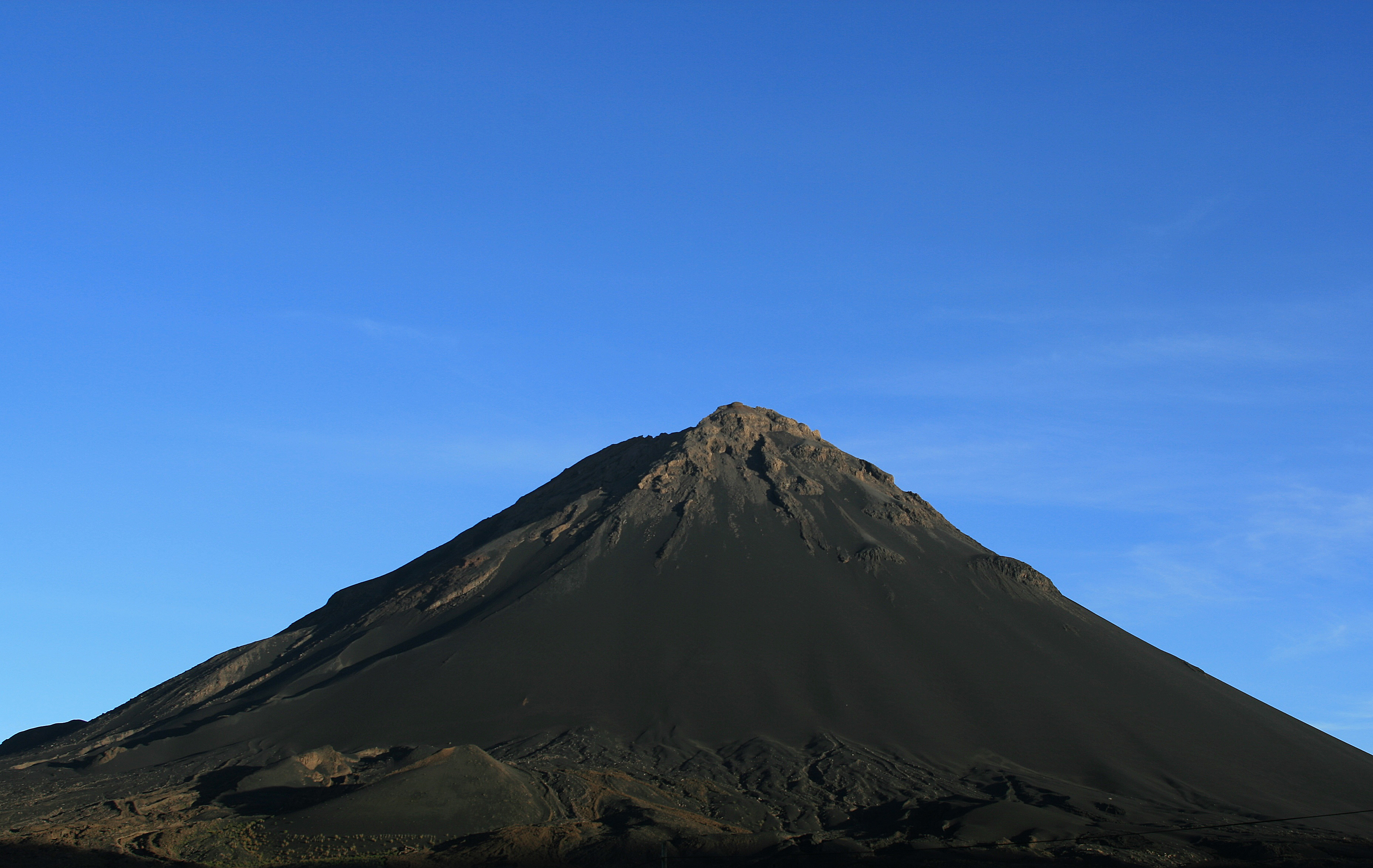
Mount Fogo, Cape Verde

No	Peak	Country	Elevation (m)	Prominence (m)	Col (m)
1	Mount Fogo	Cape Verde (Fogo)	2,829	2,829	0
2	Tope de Coroa	Cape Verde (Santo Antão)	1,979	1,979	0

== West Africa ==
No	Peak	Country	Elevation (m)	Prominence (m)	Col (m)
1	Mount Bintumani	Sierra Leone	1,945	1,665	280

== Cameroon Line ==
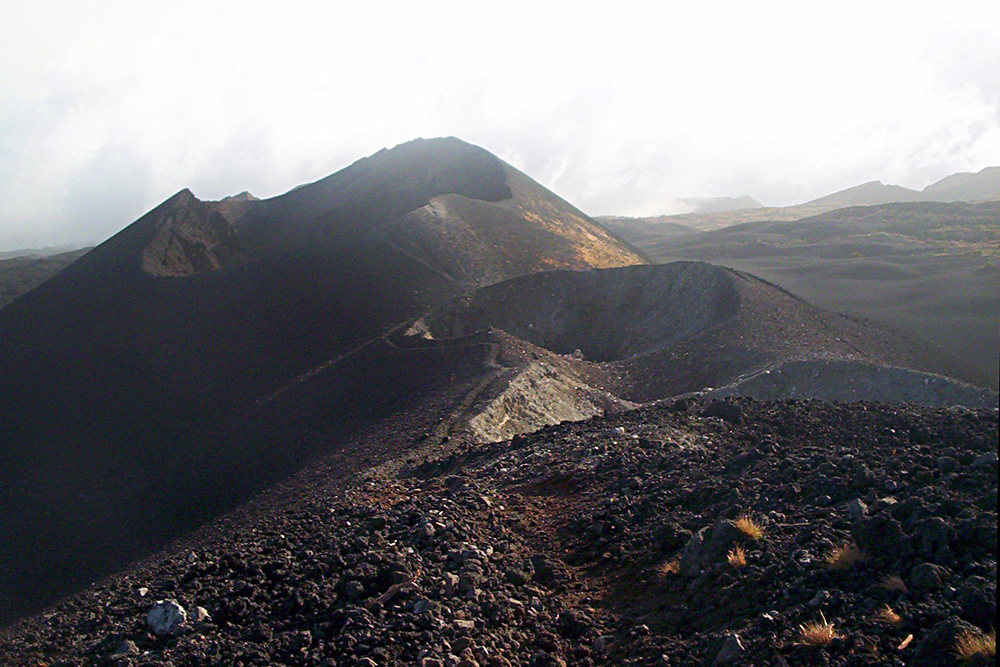
Mount Cameroon, Cameroon

No	Peak	Country	Elevation (m)	Prominence (m)	Col (m)
1	Mount Cameroon	Cameroon	4,070	3,931	139
2	Pico Basilé	Equatorial Guinea (Bioko)	3,011	3,011	0
3	Mount Oku	Cameroon	3,011	2,491	520
4	Pico de São Tomé	São Tomé and Príncipe (São Tomé)	2,024	2,024	0
5	Gran Caldera de Luba	Equatorial Guinea (Bioko)	2,261	1,539	722

== Ethiopian Highlands ==
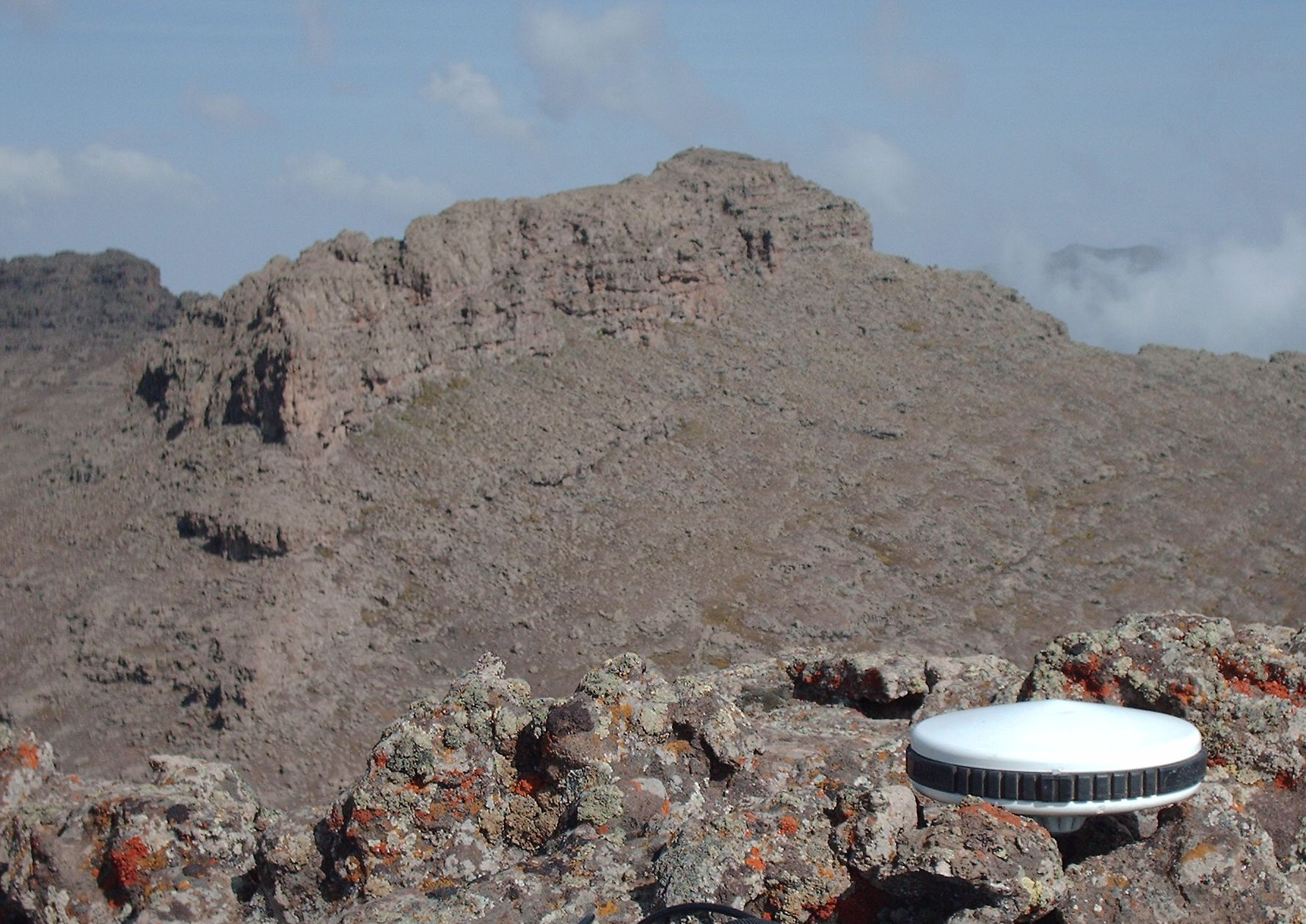
Ras Dashen, Ethiopia

No	Peak	Country	Elevation (m)	Prominence (m)	Col (m)
1	Ras Dashen	Ethiopia	4,533	3,980	553
2	Tullu Dimtu	Ethiopia	4,400	2,527	1873
3	Ch'ok'e	Ethiopia	4,100	2,225	1875
4	Argun	Ethiopia	3,418	2,208	1210
5	Amba Farit	Ethiopia	4,270	2,061	2209
6	Guge	Ethiopia	3,568	2,013	1555
7	Ramlo	Eritrea	2,248	1,920	328
8	Mount Abuna Yosef	Ethiopia	4,260	1,909	2351
9	Mai Gudo	Ethiopia	3,359	1,859	1770
10	Tulu Welel	Ethiopia	3,301	1,742	1559
11	Mount Smith	Ethiopia	2,560	1,690	870
12	Aggio	Ethiopia	3,358	1,630	1728
13	Argun North	Ethiopia	3,405	1,610	1795
14	Moussa Ali	Djibouti / Eritrea / Ethiopia	2,021	1,607	414
15	Bada	Ethiopia	4,195	1,605	2590
16	Belaya	Ethiopia	2,731	1,601	1130
17	Karkoor	Somalia	2,120	1,598	522
18	Dubbi	Ethiopia	3,950	1,550	2400
19	Guna Terara	Ethiopia	4,120	1,510	2610
20	Delo	Ethiopia	3,240	1,510	1730
21	Gara Muleta	Ethiopia	3,405	1,502	1903

== Surrounding the Western Rift Valley ==
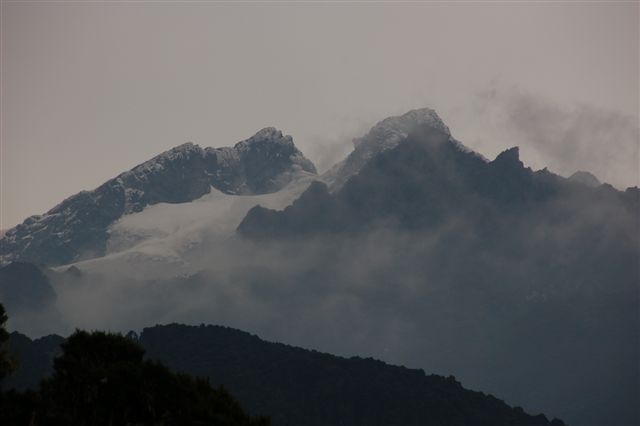
Mount Stanley, Uganda/Congo

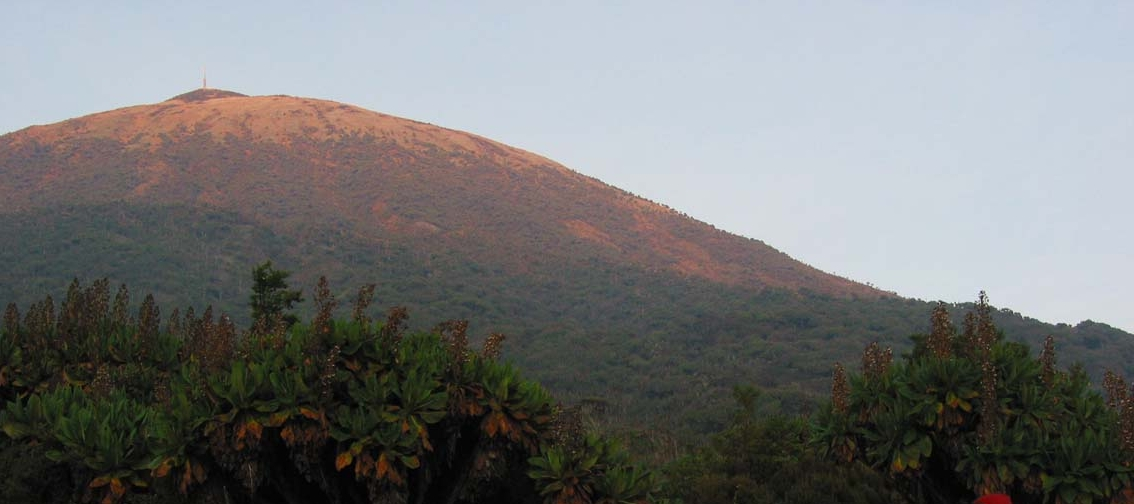
Mount Karisimbi, Rwanda

No	Peak	Country	Elevation (m)	Prominence (m)	Col (m)
1	Mount Stanley	Democratic Republic of the Congo / Uganda	5,109	3,951	1158
2	Mount Karisimbi	Rwanda / Democratic Republic of the Congo	4,507	3,312	1195
3	Kinyeti	South Sudan	3,187	2,120	1067
4	Emogadong	South Sudan	2,623	1,730	893
5	Kabobo	Democratic Republic of the Congo	2,725	1,604	1121
6	Mont Mohi	Democratic Republic of the Congo	3,480	1,592	1888
7	Wuhevi	Democratic Republic of the Congo	3,095	1,570	1525
8	Mount Muhabura	Rwanda / Uganda	4,127	1,530	2597

== Surrounding the East African Rift ==
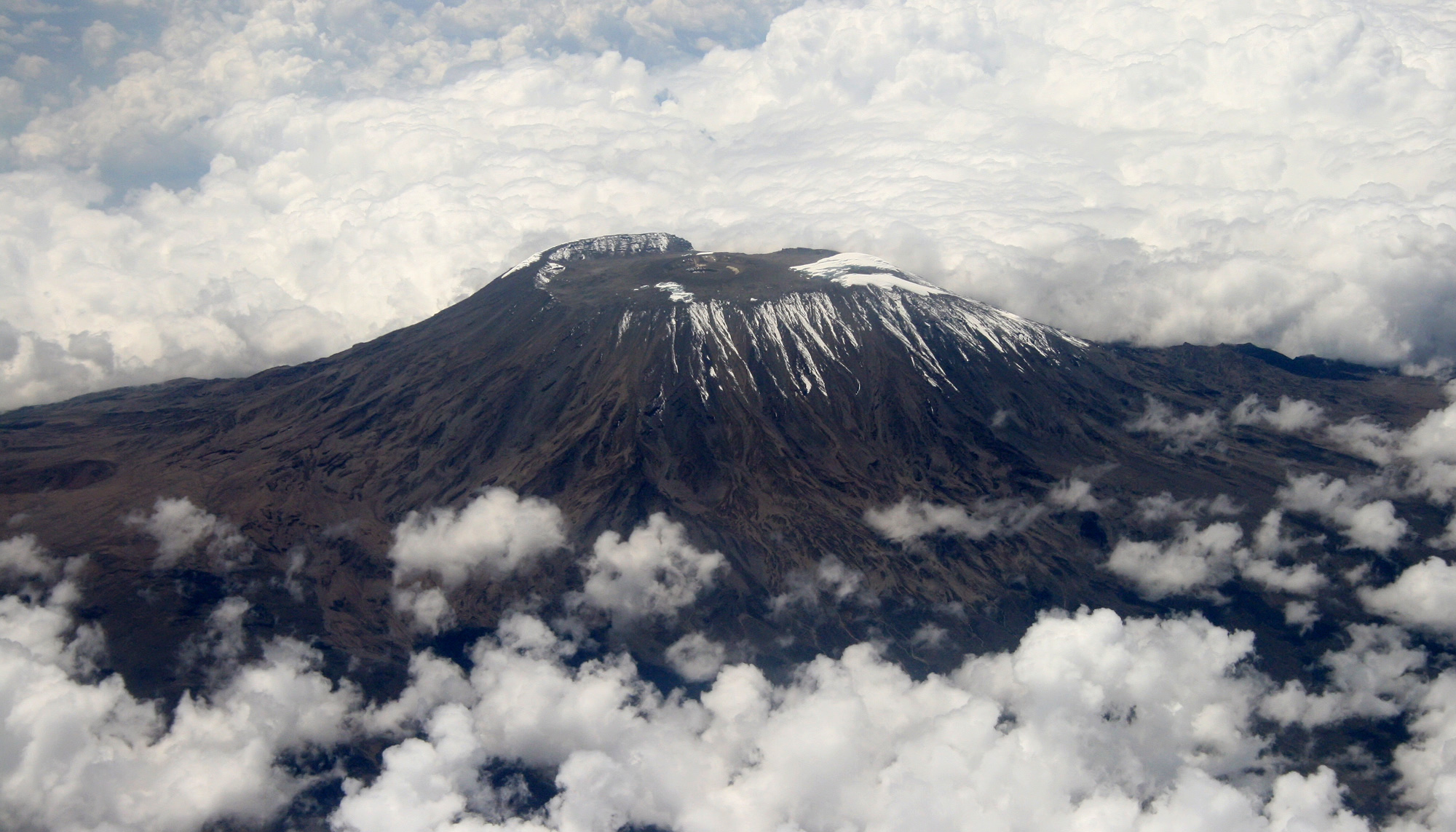
Mount Kilimanjaro, Tanzania

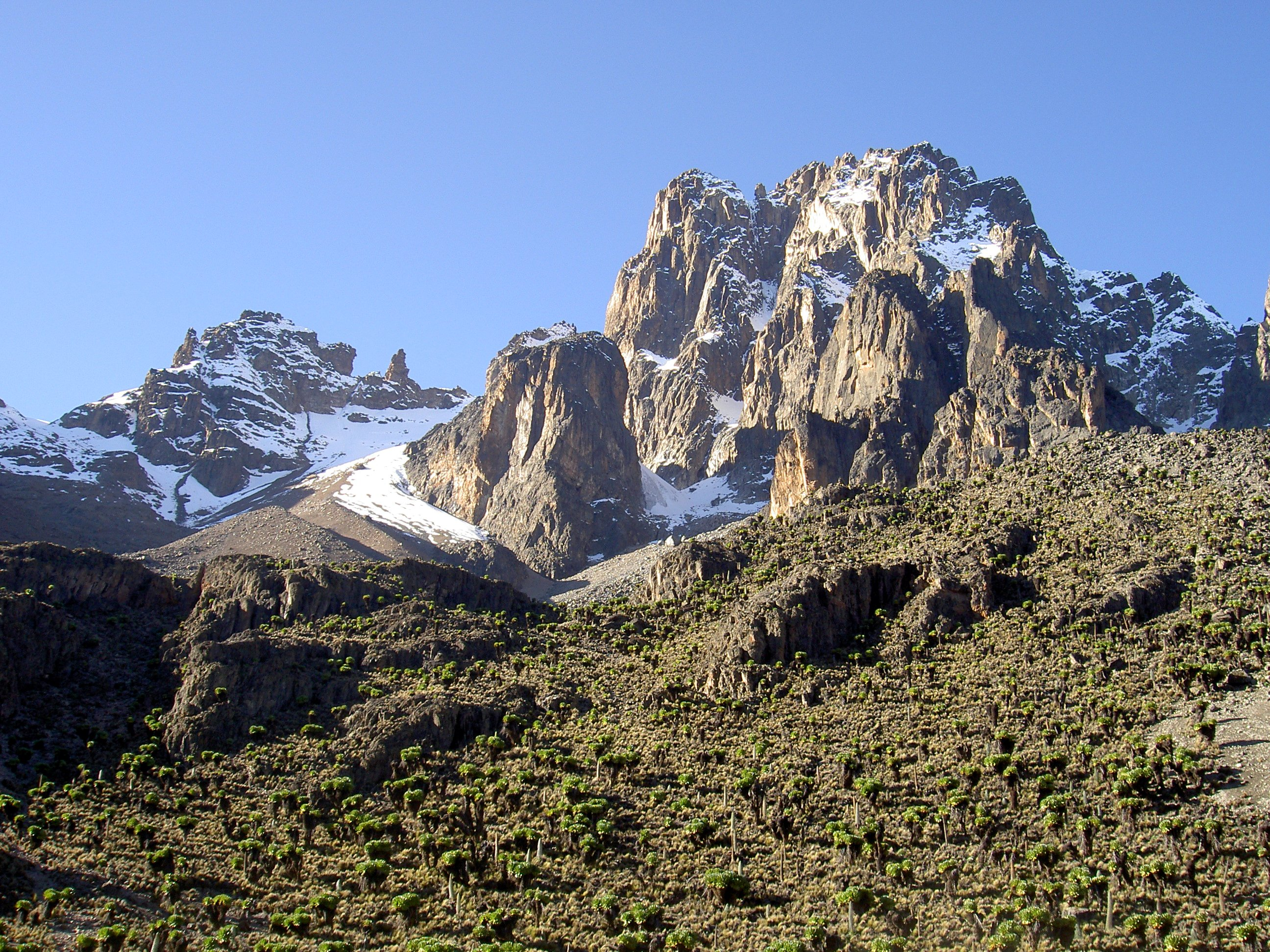
Mount Kenya, Kenya

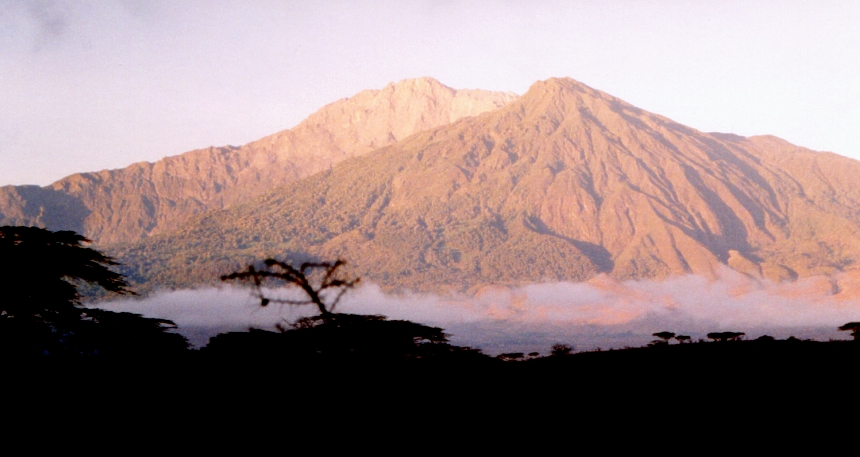
Mount Meru, Tanzania

No	Peak	Country	Elevation (m)	Prominence (m)	Col (m)
1	Mount Kilimanjaro	Tanzania	5,895	5,885	10
2	Mount Kenya	Kenya	5,199	3,825	1374
3	Mount Meru	Tanzania	4,565	3,170	1395
4	Mount Elgon	Kenya/Uganda	4,321	2,458	1863
5	Mulanje Massif	Malawi	3,002	2,319	683
6	Kimhandu Hill	Tanzania	2,653	2,121	532
7	Mount Satima	Kenya	4,001	2,081	1920
8	Mount Hanang	Tanzania	3,420	2,050	1370
9	Loolmalassin	Tanzania	3,682	2,040	1642
10	Gelai Peak	Tanzania	2,948	1,930	1018
11	Mount Moroto	Uganda	3,083	1,818	1265
12	Kitumbeine Volcano	Tanzania	2,858	1,770	1088
13	Chepunyal Hills	Kenya	3,334	1,759	1575
14	Mount Namuli	Mozambique	2,419	1,757	662
15	Shengena	Tanzania	2,464	1,750	714
16	Sungwi	Tanzania	2,300	1,730	570
17	Mount Kadam	Uganda	3,063	1,690	1373
18	Mtorwi	Tanzania	2,980	1,688	1292
19	Cherang'any Hills	Kenya	3,530	1,572	2009
20	Mount Kulal	Kenya	2,285	1,542	743
21	Karenga	Tanzania	2,279	1,529	750
22	Mount Ng'iro	Kenya	2,848	1,501	1347

== Southern African Plateau ==
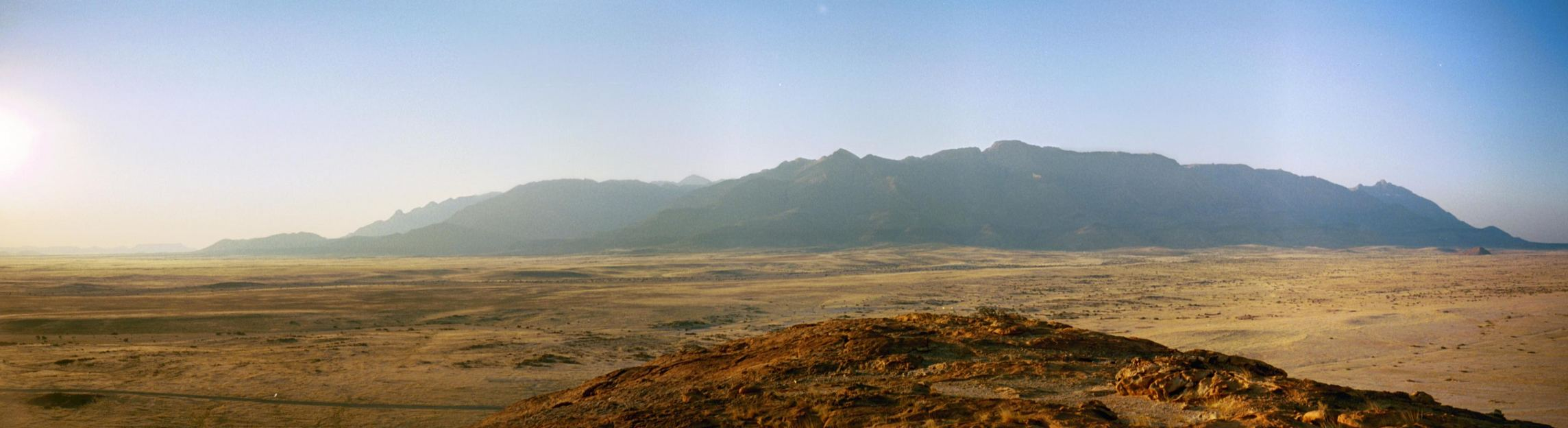
Brandberg Mountain, Namibia

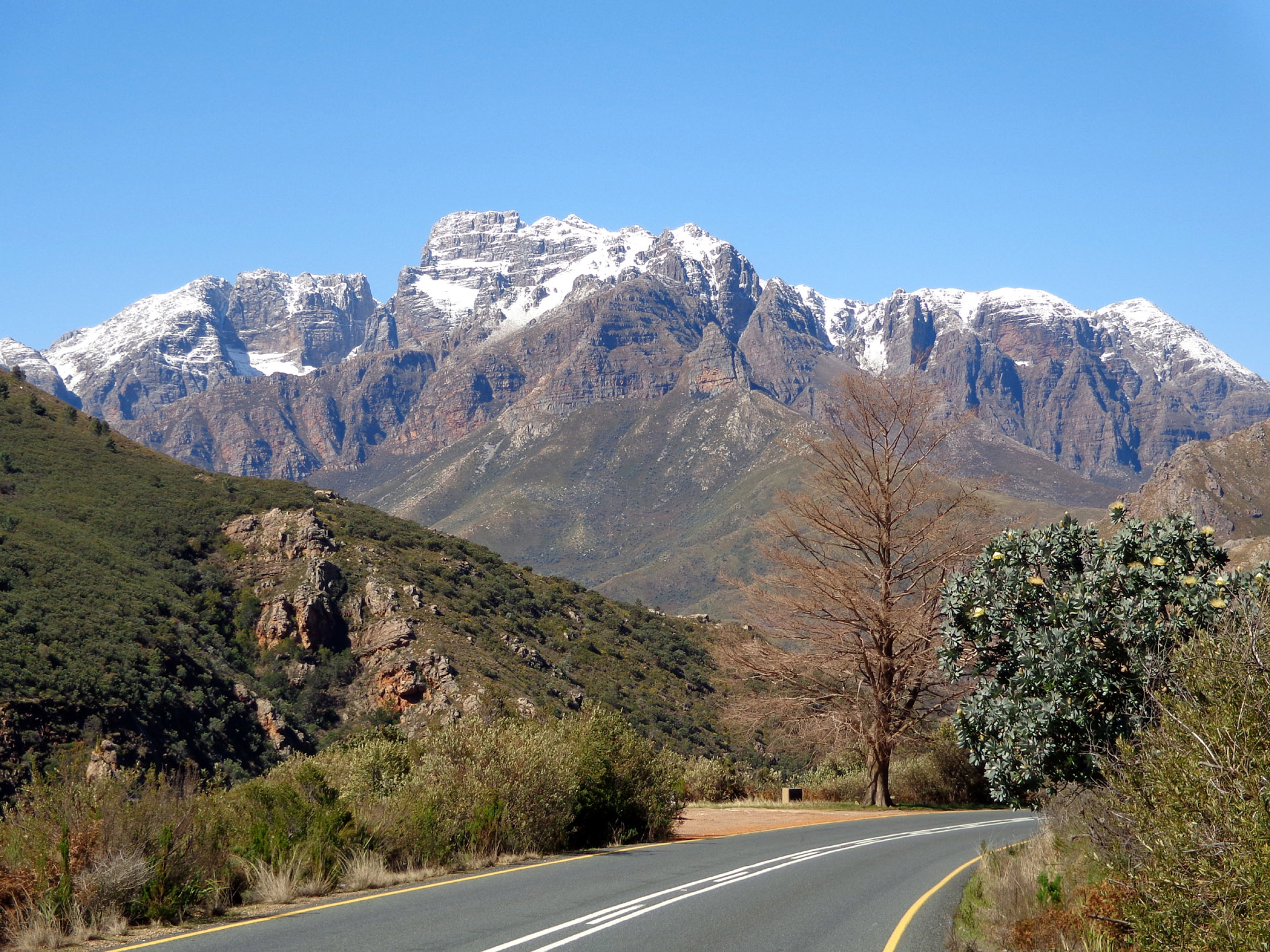
Du Toits Peak, South Africa

No	Peak	Country	Elevation (m)	Prominence (m)	Col (m)
1	Thabana Ntlenyana	Lesotho	3,482	2,390	1092
2	Brandberg Mountain	Namibia	2,606	1,802	804
3	Du Toits Peak	South Africa	1,995	1,730	265
4	Mount Tama	Angola	2,489	1,610	879
5	Seweweekspoortpiek	South Africa	2,325	1,543	782
6	Mount Nyangani	Zimbabwe	2,592	1,515	1077
7	Mount Moco	Angola	2,620	1,510	1110

== Madagascar and surrounding islands ==
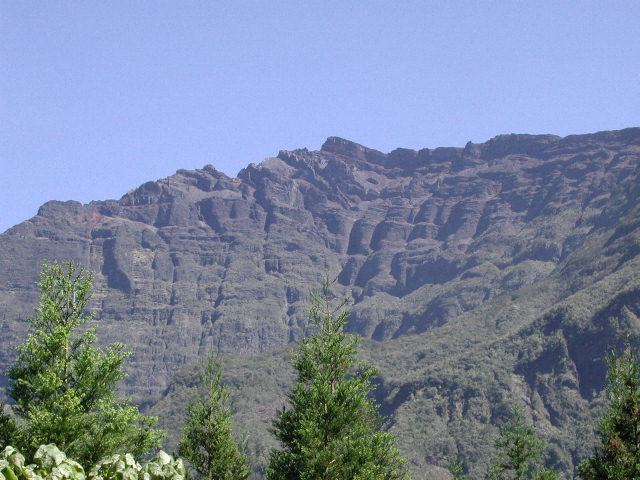
Piton des Neiges, Réunion

No	Peak	Country	Elevation (m)	Prominence (m)	Col (m)
1	Piton des Neiges	France (Réunion)	3,069	3,069	0
2	Maromokotro	Madagascar	2,876	2,876	0
3	Mount Karthala	Comoros (Grande Comore)	2,361	2,361	0
4	Pic Boby	Madagascar	2,658	1,875	783
5	Tsiafajavona	Madagascar	2,643	1,663	980
6	Mount Ntringui	Comoros (Anjouan)	1,595	1,595	0

== Sources ==
- List
- Map
