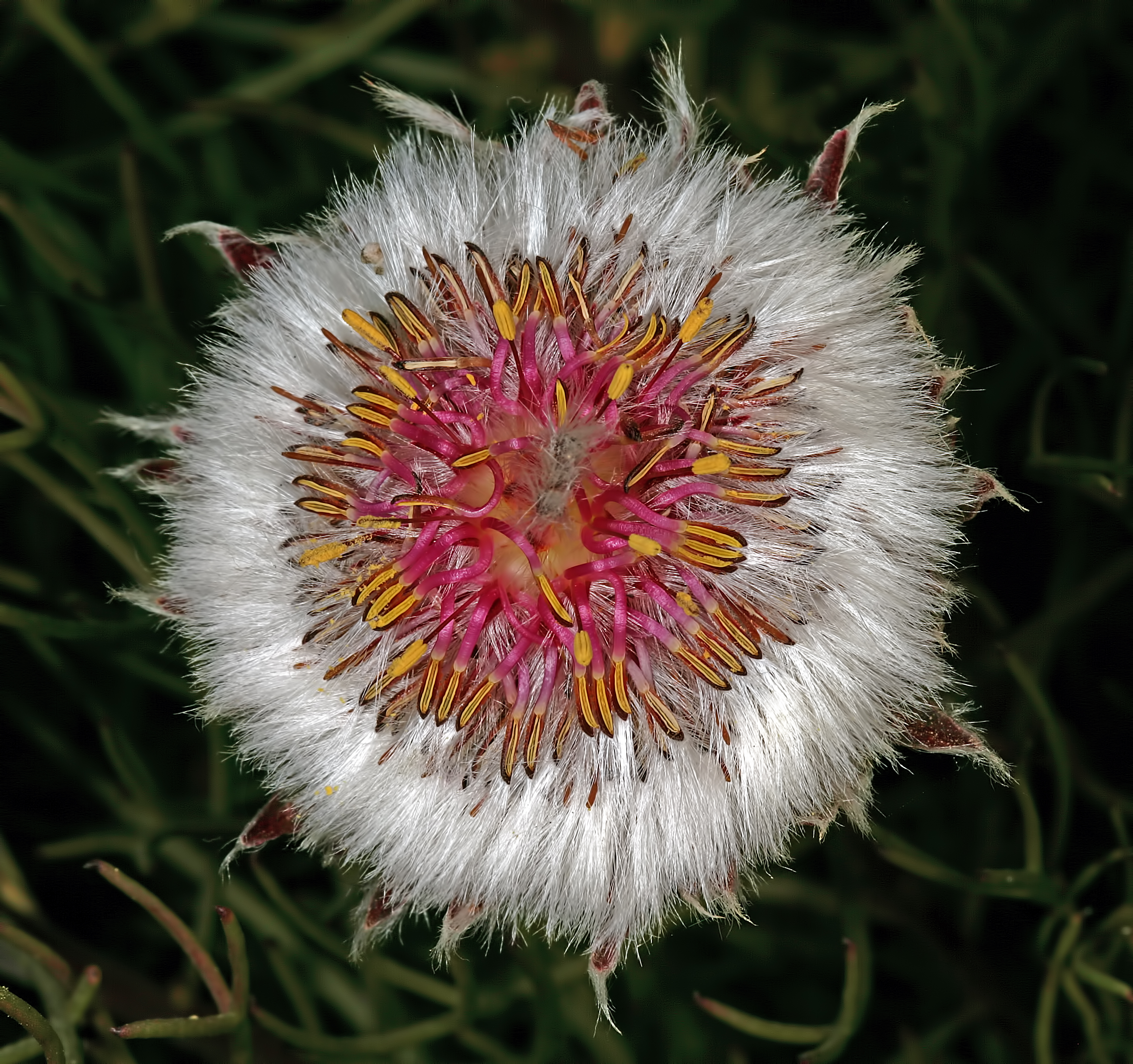

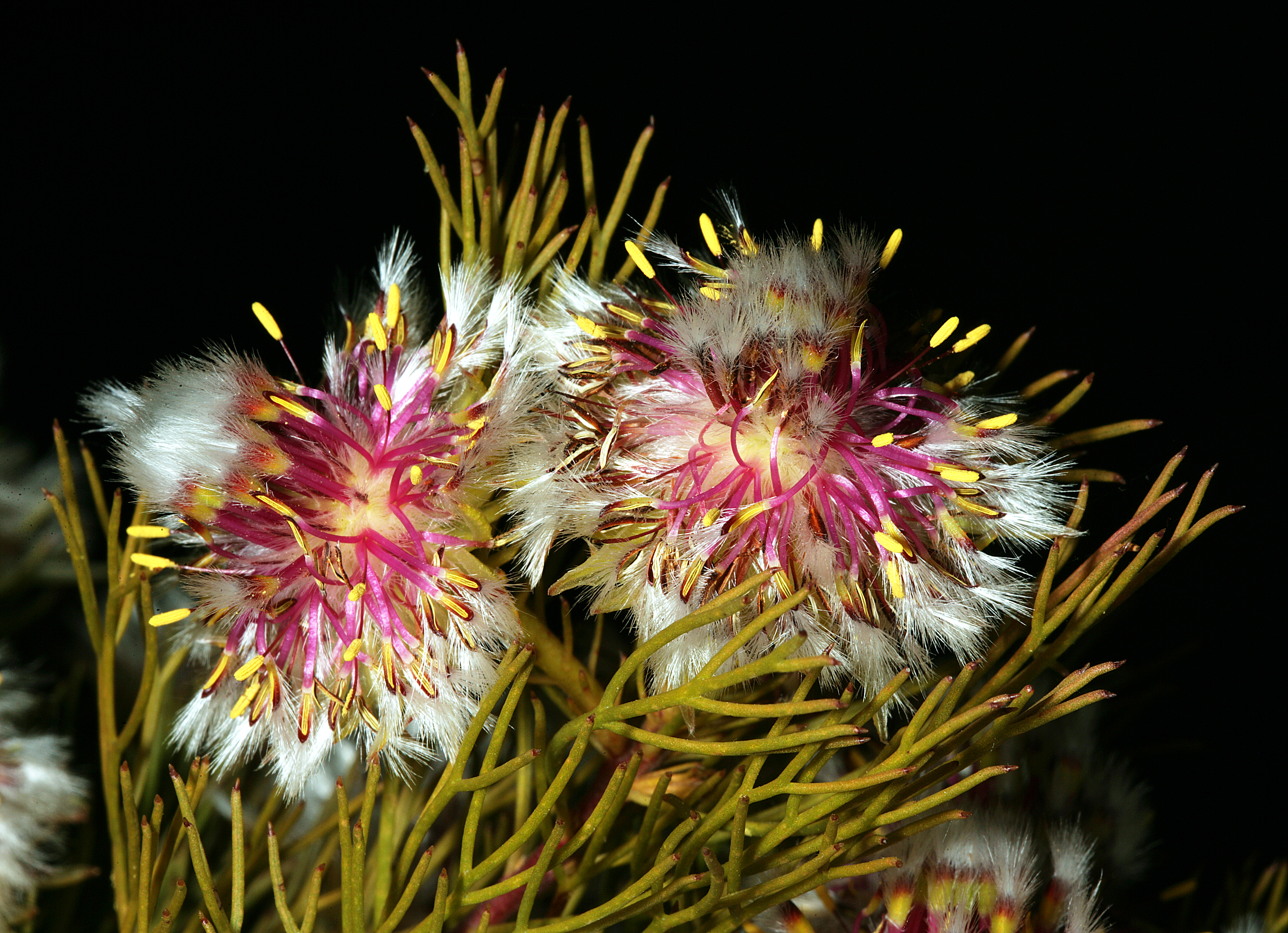

Conservation status
- Least Concern (IUCN 3.1)

Scientific classification
- Kingdom: Plantae
- Clade: Tracheophytes
- Clade: Angiosperms
- Clade: Eudicots
- Order: Proteales
- Family: Proteaceae
- Genus: Serruria
- Species: S. phylicoides

Binomial name
- Serruria phylicoides (P.J.Bergius) R.Br.

= Serruria phylicoides =

Species of plant

Serruria phylicoides, the bearded spiderhead, is a flower-bearing shrub that belongs to the genus Serruria and forms part of the fynbos. The plant is native to the Western Cape, where it occurs in the Du Toits Peak, the Hottentots Holland Mountains, the Riviersonderend Mountains and the Kleinrivier Mountains. The shrub grows 1.0 m tall and bears flowers from August to November.

In Afrikaans it known as donsigespinnekopbos.
