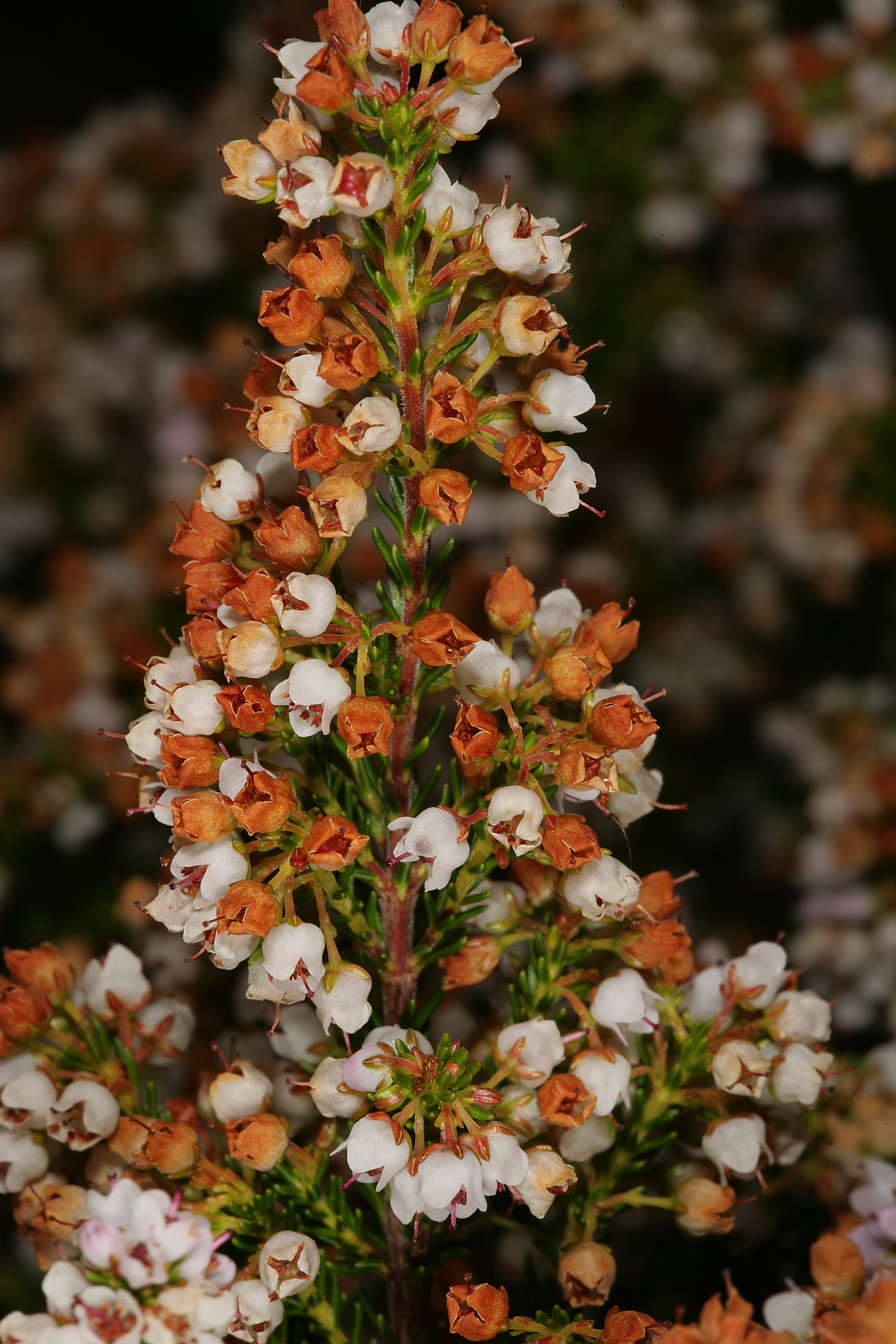

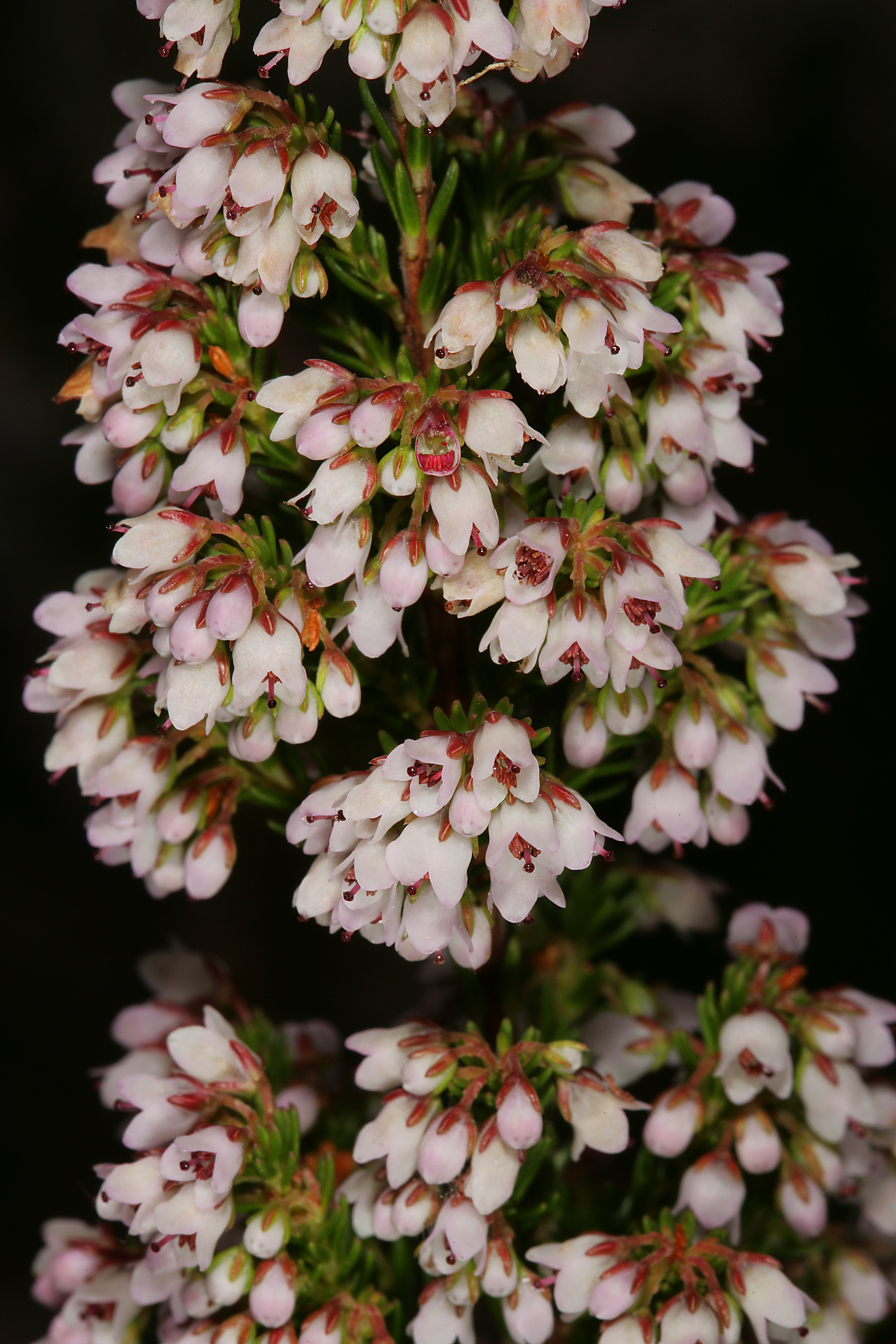

Scientific classification
- Kingdom: Plantae
- Clade: Tracheophytes
- Clade: Angiosperms
- Clade: Eudicots
- Clade: Asterids
- Order: Ericales
- Family: Ericaceae
- Genus: Erica
- Species: E. curvirostris

Binomial name
- Erica curvirostris Salisb., (1802)

Synonyms
- Erica decunata Steud.; Erica thyrsoidea Tausch

= Erica curvirostris =

Species of flowering plant

Erica curvirostris is a plant belonging to the genus Erica and forming part of the fynbos. The species is endemic to the Western Cape and occurs in the Du Toitskloof Mountains, Hottentots Holland Mountains, Kogelberg, Kleinrivier Mountains and Table Mountain.
