= Leucadendron comosum =

Conservation status
- Least Concern (IUCN 3.1)

Scientific classification
- Kingdom: Plantae
- Clade: Tracheophytes
- Clade: Angiosperms
- Clade: Eudicots
- Order: Proteales
- Family: Proteaceae
- Genus: Leucadendron
- Species: L. comosum

Binomial name
- Leucadendron comosum (Thunb.) R. Br., 1810

Species of plant

Leucadendron comosum, the ridge-cone conebush is a species of plant in the family Proteaceae. It was first described by Carl Peter Thunberg, and given the correct name by Robert Brown.

== Subspecies ==
There are two subspecies recognized under L. comosum.

- Leucadendron comosum subsp. comosum (Common ridge-cone conebush)
- Leucadendron comosum subsp. homaeophyllum (Villiersdorp ridge-cone conebush)
