= Gabal Sha'ib El Banat =

Mountain in Egypt

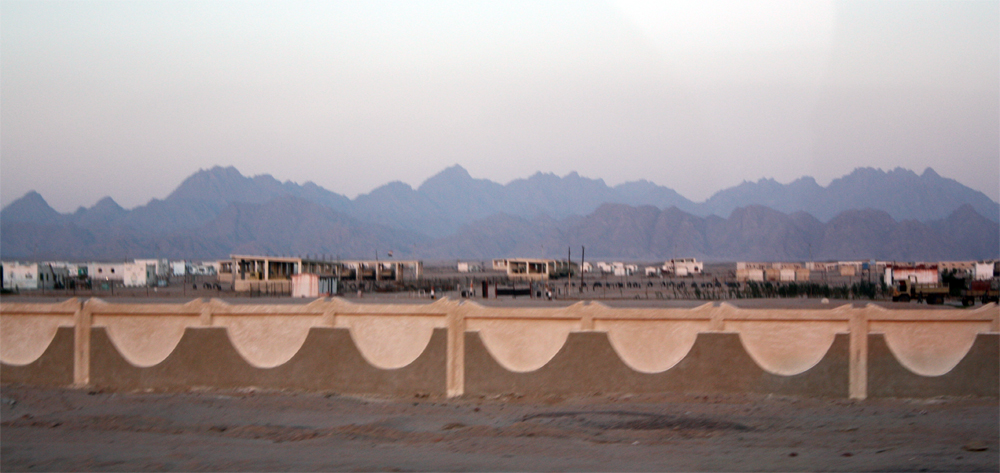
- Shayib al-Banat mountains along the Hurghada-Safaga Road, Egypt

Highest point
- Elevation: 2,187 m (7,175 ft)
- Prominence: 1,747 m (5,732 ft)
- Listing: Ultra
- Coordinates: 26°58′47″N 33°29′11″E

Geography
- Location within Egypt
- Location: Red Sea Governorate
- Parent range: Red Sea Hills

Gabal Sha'ib El Banat is a mountain in Egypt, situated in the Saharan Eastern Desert, 40 km from the Red Sea, between the cities of Hurghada and Safaga.

== Geography ==
Gabal Sha'ib El Banat is the highest peak of the Eastern Desert mountain range, and the highest peak of mainland Egypt (excluding the Sinai Peninsula and therefore Mount Catherine).

=== Peaks ===
The group of peaks of the Shaiyb al-Banat is composed of four mountains:

- Gabal Abu Dukhan (1,705 m.),
- Gabal Qattar (or Gattar, 1,963 m.),
- Gabal Shayeb El-Banat (2,187 m.),
- Gabal Umm Anab (1,782 m.).

Seasonal rivulets on its slopes are from precipitation and springs.

== People ==
The area of Gabal Sha'ib El Banat is mainly inhabited by the Ma'aza tribe, also known as Bani Attia, which is composed of about 4,000/5,000 people that live in an area of 90,000 km². These people are nomads and live with their cattle of sheep, goats, and dromedaries. The Bedouin Arab of Banu Hilal have lived in area between 11th and 12th centuries.

== See also ==
- List of Ultras of Africa
