= Guge (mountain) =

Mountain in Ethiopia

- Location within Ethiopia

Highest point
- Elevation: 4,212 m (13,819 ft)
- Prominence: 2,013 m (6,604 ft)
- Listing: Ultra; Ribu
- Coordinates: 6°12′13″N 37°23′20″E

Geography
- Country: Ethiopia
- Parent range: Central Ethiopian Highlands

Guge (Gugee) is a mountain located in South Ethiopia Peoples’ Region, Ethiopia. Guge is an Ultra-prominent peak and is the 27th highest in Africa. It has an elevation of 3,568 metres (11,706 ft).

== See also ==
- List of ultras of Africa
