= Emogadong =

Mountain in South Sudan

- Location within South Sudan

Highest point
- Elevation: 2,623 m (8,606 ft)
- Prominence: 1,730 m (5,680 ft)
- Isolation: 28.82 km (17.91 mi)
- Listing: Ultra
- Coordinates: 4°11′50″N 33°7′48″E

Geography
- Country: South Sudan
- State: Eastern Equatoria
- Parent range: Central East African Plateau

Emogadong is a mountain located in Eastern Equatoria, South Sudan. Emogadon is an Ultra-prominent peak, and is the 41st highest in Africa. It has an elevation of 2,623 m (8,606 ft).

== See also ==
List of ultras of Africa
