= Chepunyal Hills =

Ultra-prominent peak in Kenya

- Location within Kenya

Highest point
- Elevation: 3,334 m (10,938 ft)
- Prominence: 1,759 m (5,771 ft)
- Listing: Ultra
- Coordinates: 1°37′15″N 35°15′30″E

Geography
- Country: Kenya
- Parent range: Great Rift Valley

Chepunyal Hills is a hill and ultra-prominent peak located in West Pokot, Kenya. It is the 36th highest ultra-prominent peak in Africa. It has an elevation of 3,334 m (10,938 ft).

== See also ==
- List of ultras of Africa
