= Du Toitskloof Pass =

Coordinates: 33°43′29.1″S 19°08′48.0″E

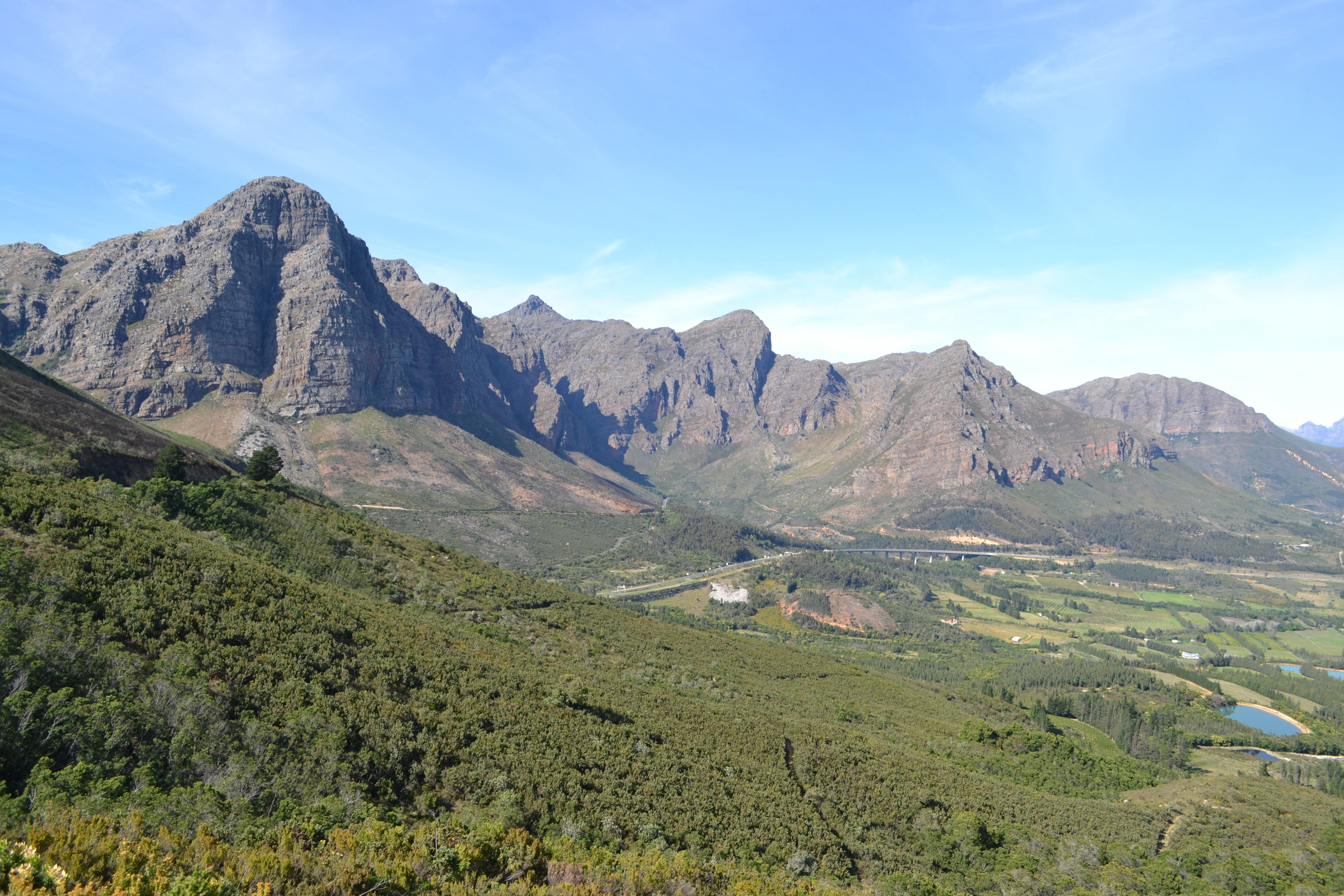
- Du Toitskloof Pass
- Interactive map of Du Toitskloof Pass
- Elevation: 820 m (2,690 ft)
- Traversed by: N1 and R101

Third Approach
- Range: Du Toitskloof Mountains

Du Toitskloof Pass (English: Du Toit's Rift) is situated in the Western Cape province of South Africa, on the regional route R101 between Paarl and Worcester. It was initially an animal track where a road was built around the time of World War II, including a 200m Du Toitskloof Tunnel.

Since the opening of the 3900m Huguenot Tunnel in 1988, the pass no longer forms part of the N1 national road and was renumbered as R101.

== Geography ==
=== Route ===
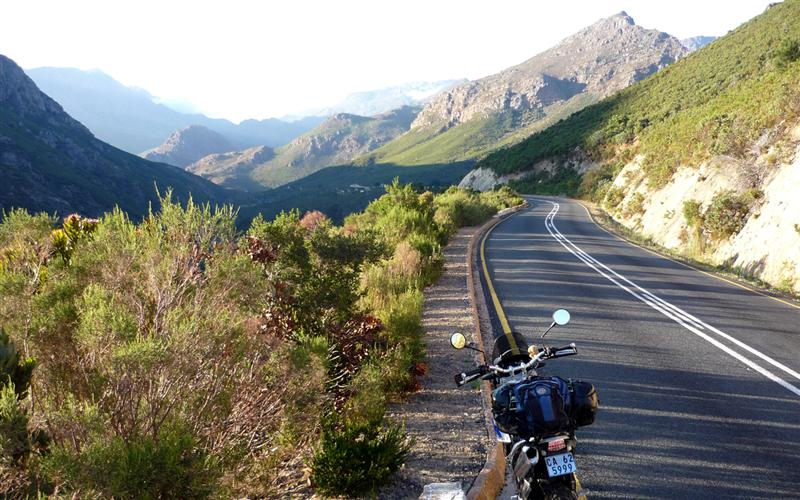
Part of the pass

Originally 48 km long, the pass climbed to 820 metres (2,690 ft). The Huguenot Tunnel, opened in 1988, is the largest curved structure in South Africa and shortens the road by 11 kilometres (6.8 mi). It is operated as a toll road. There is an impressive viaduct on the Paarl approach side.

The surrounding peaks often sport a covering of snow and the Mountain Club of South Africa has huts in the area. Du Toits Peak is the highest mountain at 1,995 metres (6,545 ft).

== History ==
The pass was named after Francois Du Toit, a 17th-century Huguenot refugee and pioneer who settled in the foothills. Prior to 1825, farmers used the pass to get to the interior beyond. At that time, Detlef Siegfried Schonfeldt (a former lieutenant in the 45th Württemberg Hussars) of the farm Du Toitskloof asked the Cape Colony government for money for a road through the pass but no funds were provided. Another pass became the better route and in 1845, the route over the Bainskloof Pass was constructed, named after engineer Andrew Geddes Bain. In 1930, engineer P.A. de Villiers explored the idea of a road over the pass and in 1938 it was investigated further by the National Roads Board with the route finalised in 1940. The project was started in the summer of 1941/42. It cost R1.25 million and was 40 km long with the road opened in March 1949 by Prime Minister DF Malan.
