= Leucadendron comosum subsp. comosum =

Conservation status
- Least Concern (IUCN 3.1)

Scientific classification
- Kingdom: Plantae
- Clade: Tracheophytes
- Clade: Angiosperms
- Clade: Eudicots
- Order: Proteales
- Family: Proteaceae
- Genus: Leucadendron
- Species: L. comosum R.Br.
- Subspecies: L. c. subsp. comosum

Trinomial name
- Leucadendron comosum subsp. comosum

Subspecies of plant

Leucadendron comosum subsp. comosum, the common ridge-cone conebush, is a flowering shrub and subspecies of Leucadendron comosum, belonging to the genus Leucadendron and forming part of the fynbos biome. The species is endemic to the Western Cape and the Eastern Cape where it occurs in the Langeberg, Outeniqua Mountains, Kouga Mountains, Swartberg, Touwsberg and Rooiberg.

The shrub grows up to 1.7 m tall and dies after burning but the seeds survive. The shrub flowers from October to November. The seeds are stored in a tol on the female plant and only fall to the ground when the flower has ripened and are dispersed by the wind, the seeds have wings. The plant is unisexual and there are separate plants with male and female flowers, which are pollinated by small beetles. The plant grows mainly in mountainous areas in sandstone soil at altitudes of 600 - 1,400 m.
