= Huguenot Tunnel =

Toll tunnel in South Africa

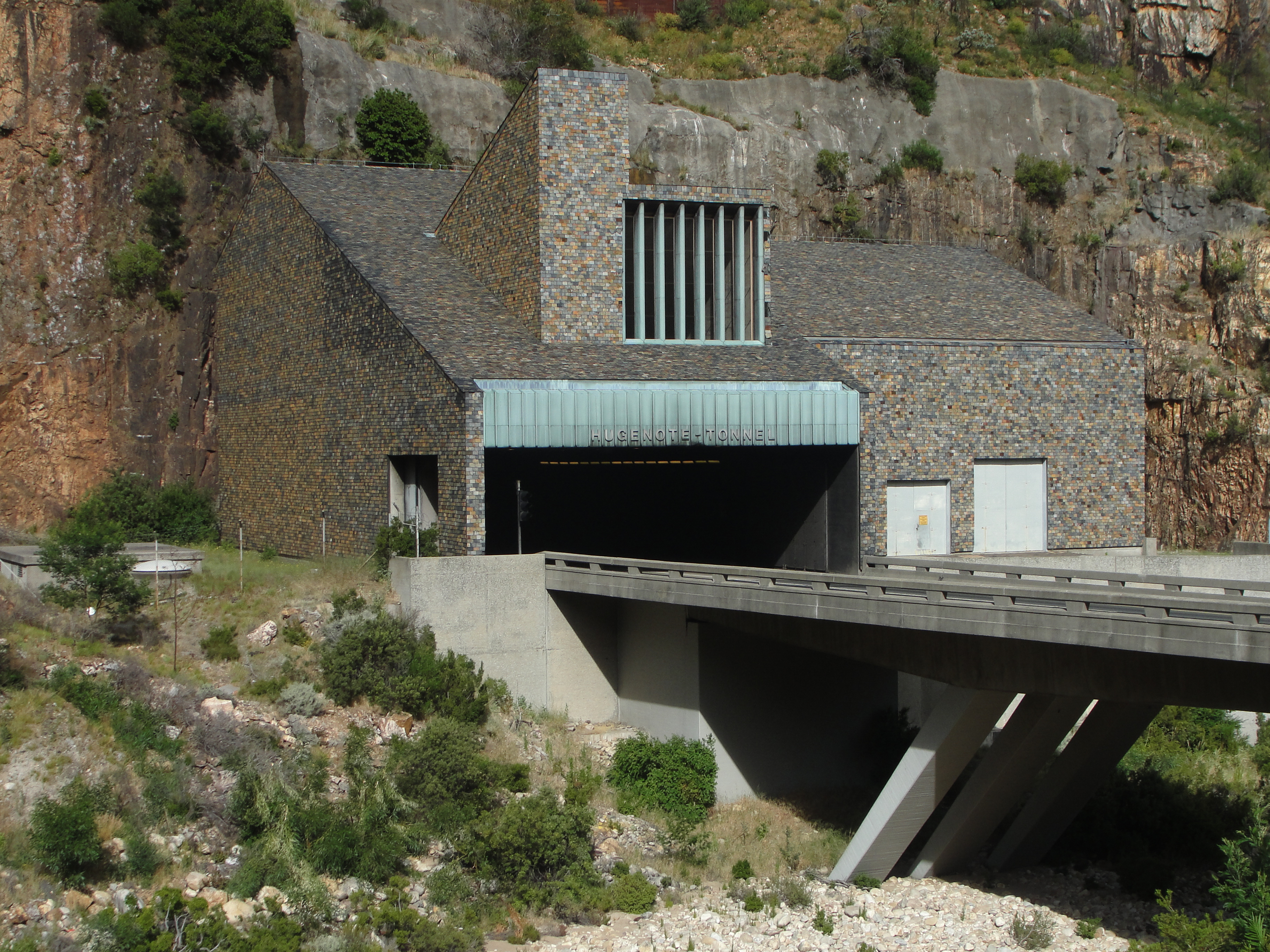
- North entrance to the Huguenot Tunnel
- Interactive map of Huguenot Tunnel

Overview
- Coordinates: 33.727778°S 19.06667°E
- Route: N1
- Crosses: Du Toitskloof Mountains

Operation
- Work began: 1984
- Constructed: Hochtief; Concor
- Opened: 18 March 1988

Technical
- Length: 3,900 m (12,800 ft)
- No. of lanes: 2
- Operating speed: 90 km/h
- Tunnel clearance: 5 m (16 ft)

The Huguenot Tunnel is a toll tunnel near Cape Town, South Africa. It extends the N1 national road through the Du Toitskloof mountains, which separate Paarl from Worcester, providing a route that is safer, faster (between 15 and 26 minutes) and shorter (by 11 km) than the old Du Toitskloof Pass travelling over the mountain. On average, 12,000 vehicles use the tunnel every day with up to 22,500 vehicles using it daily on holidays.

== History ==
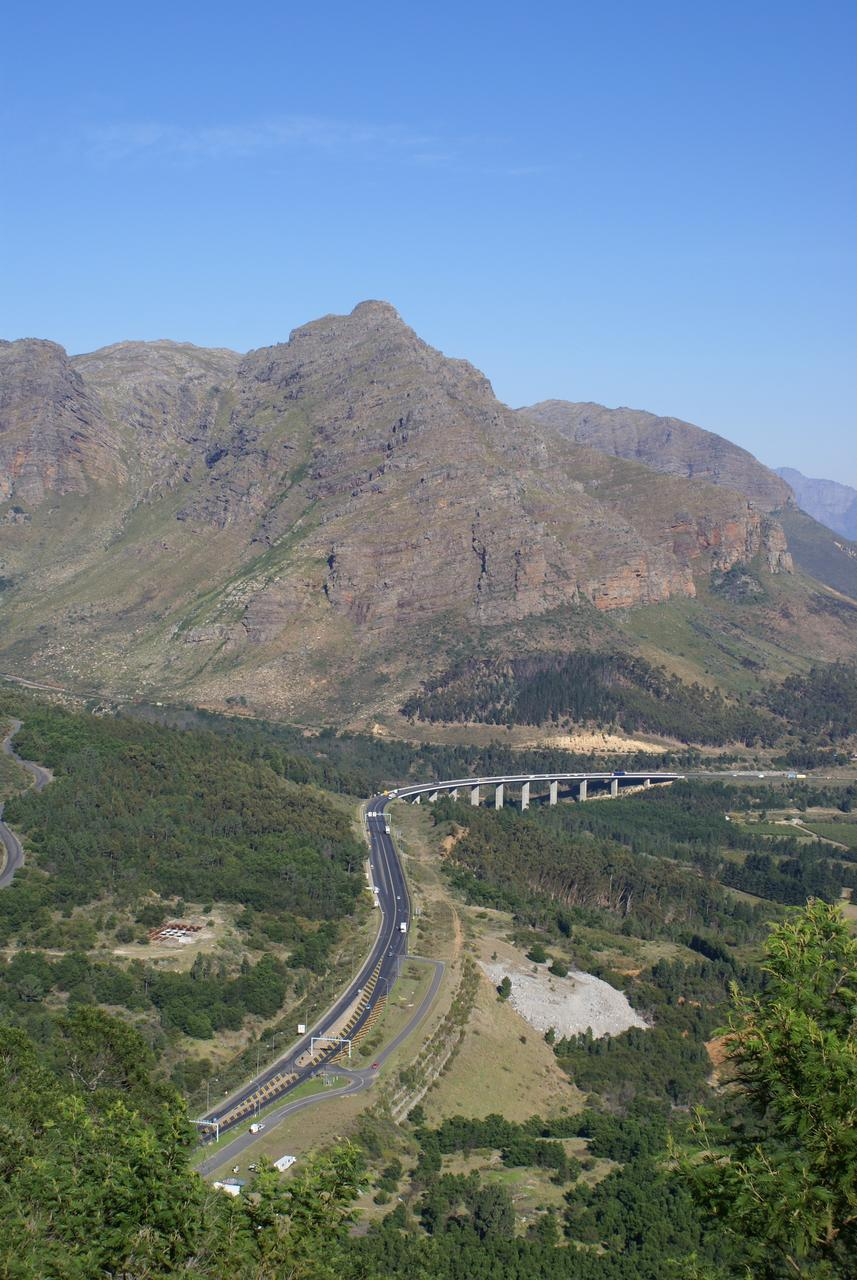
View of new road into Huguenot Tunnel

An idea for a tunnel through the Du Toitskloof Mountains was conceived in the 1930s but was put on hold due to the outbreak of World War II. The idea developed into a pass over the mountains, the Du Toitskloof pass, using the labour of Italian prisoners of war between 1942 and 1945 and continued with ordinary labour until its completion in 1948.

A 1983 economic impact assessment estimated that the construction of the tunnel would contribute R200 million to the economy of the Western Cape by 1988.

Geological surveys and design started in 1973, and excavation followed in 1984, tunneling from both ends using drilling and blasting.

The tunnel was named after the French Huguenot refugees that settled in the area in the late 1600s with one of the Huguenot refugees being Francois Du Toit, after whom Du Toitskloof was named.

=== Construction ===
The tunnel was designed by South African VKE and Swiss Electrowatt, Zurich consulting engineers.

There were two phases to the tunneling, the first a pilot tunnel to examine the route's geographical obstacles. The second phase bored a 5 m tunnel through granite rock as well as the construction of portals, drainage and ventilation tunnels. The two tunnel headings met with an error of only 3 mm over its entire 3.9 km length. The tunnel was finally opened on 18 March 1988 and cost a total of R202.6 million (equivalent to US$95 million) to construct.

The tunnel is maintained by Tolcon, a subsidiary of the Murray & Roberts construction company. The tunnel was constructed by Hochtief and Concor.

== Current plans ==
Currently the tunnel carries one lane of traffic in each direction. Plans are underway to open a second unfinished tunnel, the "northern bore", to carry eastbound traffic. This will allow for two lanes of traffic in each direction, with each tunnel carrying traffic in one direction only.

In 2002, traffic peaks occurred during Easter (a record on 26 April 18 200 vehicles) and the December school holidays (12 000 vehicles per day).

== Toll ==
The toll as proclaimed on 1 March 2025 was (in South African Rand):

- Light Vehicles: R53
- 2-axle heavy vehicles: R146
- 3 and 4-axle heavy vehicles: R229
- 5 and more-axle heavy vehicles: R371

The tunnel has 13 video cameras that feed into an automatic incident detection system, which can sound alarm devices for any of the following conditions:

- Stopped vehicles
- Fast and slow-moving traffic
- Traffic queue
- Wrong-way driving

== Sources ==
- Press release from the SA National Roads Agency
- Traficon NV
