= Argun, Russia =

Argun (Russian: Аргун) is the name of several inhabited localities in Russia.

Urban localities

- Argun, Chechen Republic, a town of republic significance in the Chechen Republic, 43°17′46″N 45°52′58″E

Rural localities

- Argun, Irkutsk Oblast, a village in Kachugsky District of Irkutsk Oblast, 53°22′03″N 105°55′47″E
- Argun, Zabaykalsky Krai, a selo in Sretensky District of Zabaykalsky Krai, 52°23′03″N 118°33′32″E
