= Kimhandu Hill =

Mountain in Tanzania

- Location within Tanzania

Highest point
- Elevation: 2,633 m (8,638 ft)
- Prominence: 570 m (1,870 ft)
- Isolation: 10.24 km (6.36 mi)
- Listing: Mountains of Tanzania; Ultra
- Coordinates: 7°10′11″S 37°40′10″E

Geography
- Country: Tanzania
- Parent range: Uluguru Mountains

Kimhondu Hill is a mountain located in Morogoro Region, Tanzania. Kimhondu Hill is an Ultra-Prominent peak and is the 20th highest is Africa. It is part of the Uluguru Mountain range. It has an elevation of 2,633 m (8,638 ft).

== See also ==
- List of Ultras of Africa
