= Bada (mountain) =

Mountain in Ethiopia

- Location within Ethiopia

Highest point
- Elevation: 4,210 m (13,810 ft)
- Prominence: 1,629 m (5,344 ft)
- Listing: Ultra; Ribu
- Coordinates: 7°54′34″N 39°23′35″E

Geography
- Parent range: Southern Ethiopian Highlands

Bada is a mountain located in Oromiya, Ethiopia. Bada is an ultra-prominent peak and is the 56th highest in Africa. It has an elevation of 4,210 m (13,810 ft).

== See also ==
- List of ultras of Africa
