= Argun, Zabaykalsky Krai =

Argun Аргун
- Selo
- Location within Zabaykalsky Krai Location within Russia
- Coordinates: 52°23′N 118°33′E
- Country: Russia
- Region: Zabaykalsky Krai
- District: Sretensky District
- Time zone: UTC+9:00

Argun (Russian: Аргун) is a rural locality (a selo) in Sretensky District, Zabaykalsky Krai, Russia. Population: 105 (2010 census); 136 (2002 census); There are 2 streets in this selo.

== Geography ==
This rural locality is located 60 km from Sretensk (the district's administrative centre), 346 km from Chita (capital of Zabaykalsky Krai) and 5,506 km from Moscow. Bolshiye Boty is the nearest rural locality.
