= Mount Tama =

Mountain in Angola

- Location within Angola

Highest point
- Elevation: 2,489 m (8,166 ft)
- Prominence: 1,610 m (5,280 ft)
- Isolation: 216.53 km (134.55 mi)
- Coordinates: 13°47′S 13°11′E

Geography
- Location: Namibe, Angola
- Parent range: Angola Plateau

Mount Tama is a mountain located in the Namibe province of Angola. Mount Tama is an Ultra-Prominent Peak and is the 53rd highest in Africa. It has an elevation of 2,489 m (8,166 ft).
