= Argun (surname) =

Argun (Russian: Аргун) is the surname of the following people:

- Aleksei Argun (1937 – 2008), Abkhazian politician
- Mübeccel Argun (1909–1982), Turkish physical education instructor, sportswoman, and radio presenter
