= Argun (mountain) =

Mountain in Ethiopia

- Location within Ethiopia

Highest point
- Elevation: 3,418 m (11,214 ft)
- Prominence: 2,207 m (7,241 ft)
- Isolation: 69.61 km (43.25 mi)
- Listing: Ultra; Ribu
- Coordinates: 6°6′N 36°45′E

Geography
- Location: Ethiopia
- Parent range: Central Ethiopian Highlands

Argun is a mountain located in South Ethiopia Regional State, Ethiopia. Argun is an Ultra-prominent peak and is the 19th highest in Africa. It has an elevation of 3,418 m (11,214 ft).

== See also ==
List of Ultras of Africa
