= Mookgophong Local Municipality =

Mookgophong
- Local municipality
- Seal

- Location in Limpopo
- Coordinates: 24°40′S 29°0′E
- Country: South Africa
- Province: Limpopo
- District: Waterberg
- Seat: Mookgophong
- Wards: 5

Government
  - Type: Municipal council
  - Mayor: Sarah Monyamane

Area
  - Total: 5,689 km^{2} (2,197 sq mi)

Population (2011)
  - Total: 35,640
  - Density: 6.265/km^{2} (16.23/sq mi)

Racial makeup (2011)
  - Black African: 85.6%
  - Coloured: 0.4%
  - Indian/Asian: 0.2%
  - White: 13.2%

First languages (2011)
  - Northern Sotho: 51.0%
  - Afrikaans: 13.3%
  - Tsonga: 12.5%
  - Sotho: 6.3%
  - Other: 16.9%
- Time zone: UTC+2 (SAST)
- Municipal code: LIM364

Mookgophong Local Municipality was a municipality located in the Waterberg District Municipality of Limpopo province, South Africa. The seat of Mookgophong Local Municipality was Mookgophong.

The Municipality was named after the type of tree found in the area, Mokgopa (a cactus).

After municipal elections on 3 August 2016 it was merged into the larger Modimolle–Mookgophong Local Municipality.

== Main places ==
The 2001 census divided the municipality into the following main places:

Place	Code	Area (km^{2})	Population	Most spoken language
Mookgophong	91601	1.20	7,685	Northern Sotho
Naboomspruit	91603	5.87	3,626	Afrikaans
Roedtan	91604	0.46	159	Afrikaans
Remainder of the municipality	91602	4,263.18	19,280	Northern Sotho

== Politics ==
The municipal council consisted of ten members elected by mixed-member proportional representation. Five councillors were elected by first-past-the-post voting in five wards, while the remaining five were chosen from party lists so that the total number of party representatives was proportional to the number of votes received. In the election of 18 May 2011 the African National Congress (ANC) won a majority of six seats on the council. The following table shows the results of the election.

Party	Votes				Seats		
Party	Ward	List	Total	%	Ward	List	Total
ANC	5,802	5,953	11,755	65.4	4	2	6
DA	1,767	1,822	3,589	20.0	1	1	2
VF+	850	730	1,580	8.8	0	1	1
COPE	548	461	1,009	5.6	0	1	1
NFP	5	25	30	0.2	0	0	0
Total	8,972	8,991	17,963	100.0	5	5	10
Spoilt votes	165	128	293				
