= Argun, Iran =

Argun ارگون
- Village
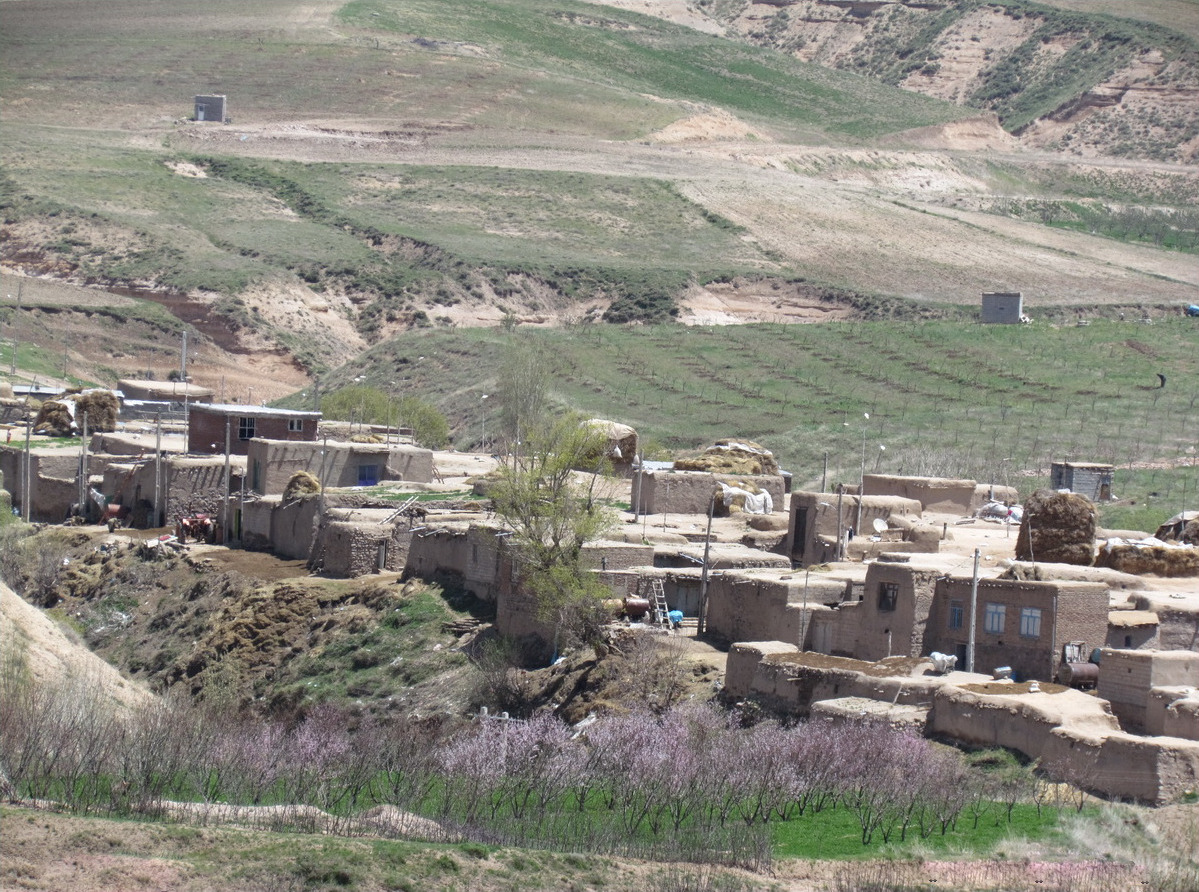

- Location within Iran
- Coordinates: 37°21′12″N 46°36′54″E
- Country: Iran
- Province: East Azerbaijan
- County: Maragheh
- Bakhsh: Saraju
- Rural District: Sarajuy-ye Sharqi

Population (2006)
  - Total: 193
- Time zone: UTC+3:30 (IRST)
  - Summer (DST): UTC+4:30 (IRDT)

Argun (Persian: ارگون, also Romanized as Ārgūn; also known as Ārqūn-e ‘Olyā) is a village in Sarajuy-ye Sharqi Rural District, Saraju District, Maragheh County, East Azerbaijan Province, Iran. At the 2006 census, its population was 193, in 27 families.

== Name ==
According to Vladimir Minorsky, the name of the village is derived from the Mongolian personal name Arghun.
