= San Carlos (Equatorial Guinea) =

- Gran Caldera de Luba
- Location within Equatorial Guinea

Highest point
- Elevation: 2,261 m (7,418 ft)
- Prominence: 1,539 m (5,049 ft)
- Listing: Ultra; Ribu
- Coordinates: 03°21′39″N 08°32′21″E

Geography
- Location: Bioko, Equatorial Guinea

Geology
- Mountain type: Shield volcano
- Last eruption: Unknown

San Carlos (also Gran Caldera de Luba, or simply Caldera) is a basaltic shield volcano with a broad summit caldera on the island of Bioko, Equatorial Guinea. With an elevation of 2,261 metres above sea level it is the second highest peak in Equatorial Guinea.

== See also ==
- Luba Crater Scientific Reserve
- List of Ultras of Africa
