= Modimolle–Mookgophong Local Municipality =

Modimolle–Mookgophong
- Local municipality
- Country: South Africa
- Province: Limpopo
- District: Waterberg

Government
  - Type: Municipal council
  - Mayor: Aaron Sebolai (ANC)

Area
  - Total: 10,367 km^{2} (4,003 sq mi)

Population (2022)
  - Total: 130,113
  - Density: 12.551/km^{2} (32.506/sq mi)

Racial makeup (2022)
  - Black African: 81.2%
  - Coloured: 0.4%
  - Indian/Asian: 0.5%
  - White African: 17.6%
- Time zone: UTC+2 (SAST)
- Municipal code: LIM368

Modimolle–Mookgophong Municipality (Northern Sotho: Mmasepala wa Modimolle–Mookgophong; Afrikaans: Modimolle–Mookgophong Munisipaliteit; Tsonga: Masipala wa Modimolle–Mookgophong) is a local municipality within the Waterberg District Municipality, in the Limpopo province of South Africa. It was established after the August 2016 local elections by merging the Mookgophong and Modimolle local municipalities. As of 2022, the total population is 130,113.

== Politics ==
The municipal council consists of twenty-eight members elected by mixed-member proportional representation. Fourteen councillors are elected by first-past-the-post voting in nine wards, while the remaining fourteen are chosen from party lists so that the total number of party representatives is proportional to the number of votes received.

The following table shows the results of the 2021 election.

Party	Ward			List			Total seats
Party	Votes	%	Seats	Votes	%	Seats	Total seats
African National Congress	12,386	49.94	12	12,363	49.72	2	14
Democratic Alliance	5,708	23.01	1	5,798	23.32	6	7
Economic Freedom Fighters	3,635	14.66	0	3,648	14.67	4	4
Freedom Front Plus	2,578	10.39	1	2,530	10.18	2	3
9 other parties	495	2.00	0	525	2.11	0	0
Total	24,802	100.00	14	24,864	100.00	14	28
Valid votes	24,802	98.80		24,864	98.44		
Invalid/blank votes	300	1.20		394	1.56		
Total votes	25,102	100.00		25,258	100.00		
Registered voters/turnout	50,580	49.63		50,580	49.94		
