= Du Toits Peak =

Mountain range in South Africa

- Dutoitspiek
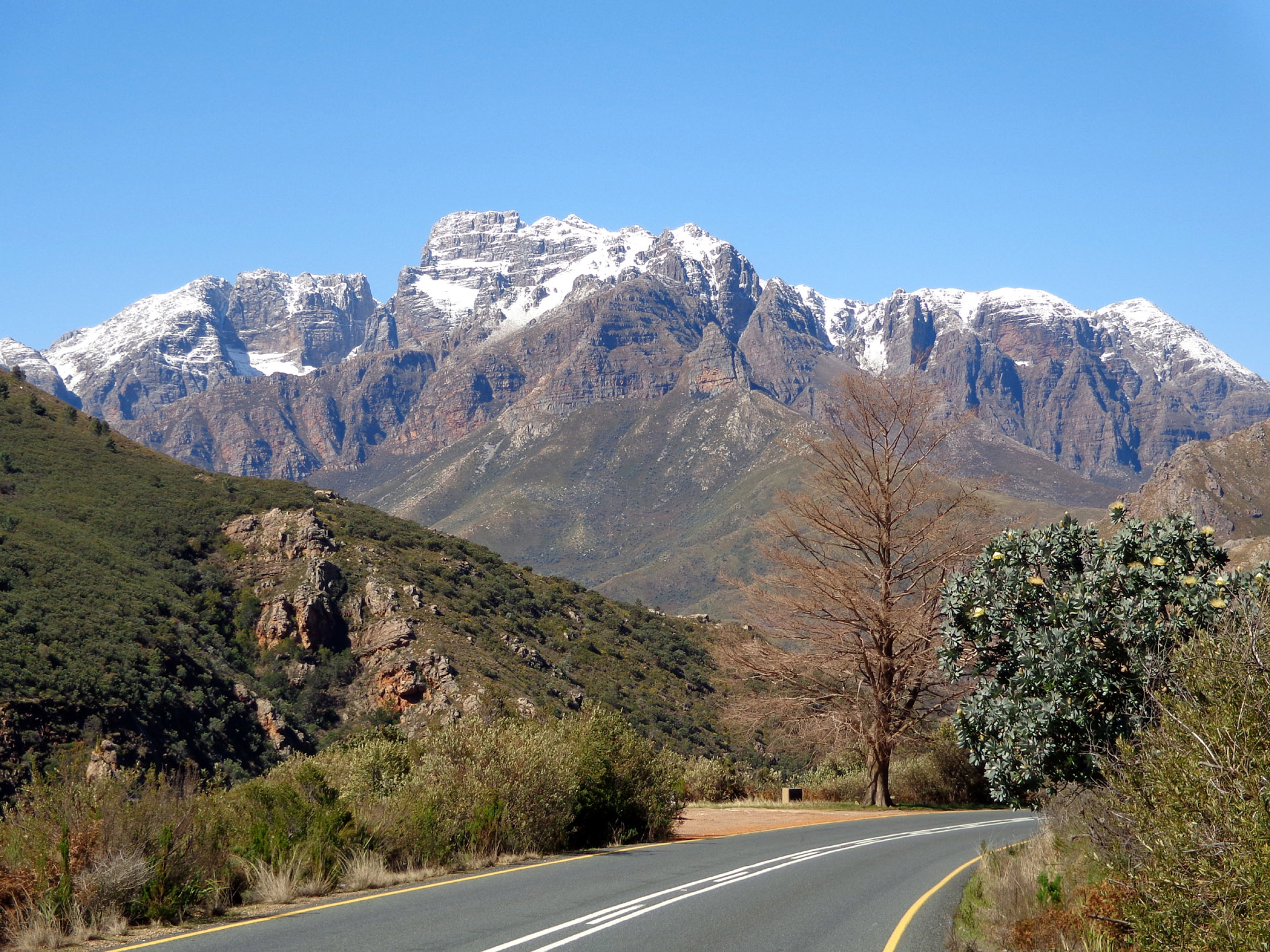
- Du Toitskloof Mountains from Du Toitskloof Pass

Highest point
- Elevation: 1,995 m (6,545 ft)
- Prominence: 1,740 m (5,710 ft)
- Listing: Ultra; Ribu; List of mountains in South Africa
- Coordinates: 33°45′18″S 19°11′12″E

Geography
- Location within South Africa
- Location: Western Cape, South Africa
- Parent range: Du Toitskloof Mountains

The Du Toitskloof Mountains (Afrikaans: [dəˈtoːis.kluəf]; Dutoitsberge) are a range in the Cape Fold Belt in the Western Cape Province of South Africa. The highest point is Du Toits Peak (Dutoitspiek) (1,995 m or 6,545 ft) which is the highest seaward facing peak in the Cape Fold Belt ranges, i.e. the highest peak in the Western Cape within direct sight of the ocean.

Located between Paarl and Worcester in the south-west of South Africa, 70 kilometres (43 mi) to the north-east of the provincial capital of Cape Town, the mountains form a formidable barrier between Cape Town and the rest of Africa. The N1 highway, also called the Cape to Cairo Road crosses them at the Du Toitskloof Pass. The old route culminated at 820 metres (2,690 ft); however, the new Huguenot Tunnel, of 3.7 kilometres (2.3 mi) in length, cuts out the old mountain pass. Sometimes the Du Toitskloof Mountains together with the Wemmershoek Mountains and others are called the Klein Drakenstein, but it is more usually considered part of the greater Boland mountain range.

Structurally, the mountains form part of the Cape Syntaxis, a complex portion of the Cape Fold Belt where the north-south trending ranges meet the east-west trending ranges in a complex series of folds and thrusts. The range mostly consists of Table Mountain sandstone, an erosion-resistant quartzitic sandstone. Vegetation is almost exclusively montane fynbos of the Cape floristic region. The rest of the mountains are barren rocks and steep cliffs. Precipitation occurs primarily in the winter months as rain on the lower slopes and as snow higher up, usually above 1000m. Climate varies dramatically, with the surrounding valleys being up to 10 °C (18 °F) warmer than the mountains. The climate falls within the Mediterranean type.

The Limietberg Nature Reserve, known for its mountain fynbos, is located in the Du Toitskloof Mountains.

== See also ==
- List of Ultras of Africa
