= Ports Regulator =

South African government agency

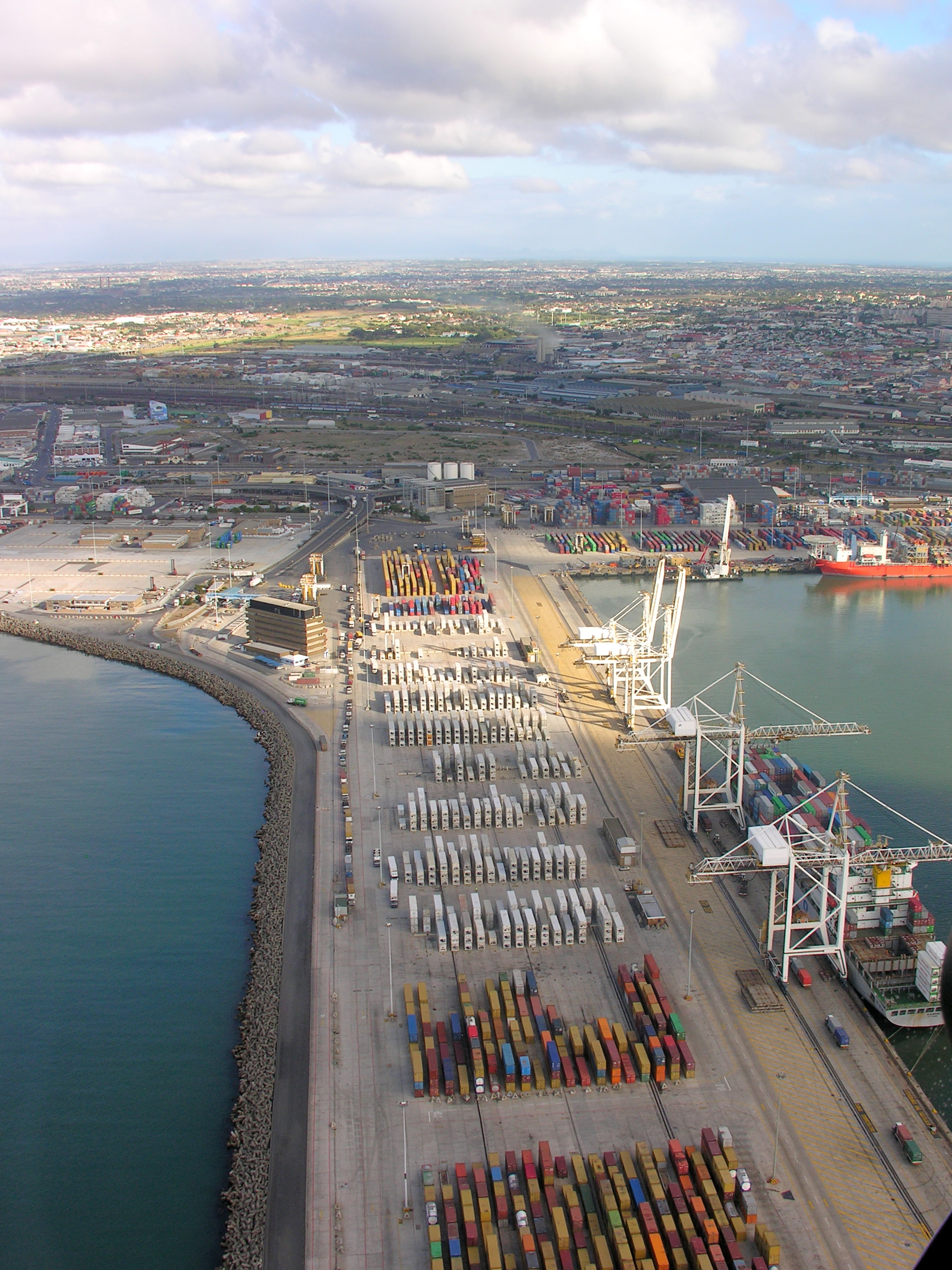
- The Port of Cape Town

National government agency overview
- Formed: 2005; 21 years ago
- Type: Port economic activity regulator
- Jurisdiction: South Africa
- Headquarters: Durban, South Africa
- National government agency executive: Zenzele Bongani Aubrey Ncobo, Chairperson
- Parent National government agency: Department of Transport
- Key document: National Ports Act 12 of 2005
- Website: portsregulator.org

The Ports Regulator of South Africa, often referred to simply as the Ports Regulator, is a South African national government agency responsible for the regulation of economic activities of the ports system in South Africa. It is based in Durban, close to the city's port.

The Regulator consists of a Chairperson and members, appointed by the Minister of Transport. The agency has a distinct mandate from the Transnet National Ports Authority, which manages South Africa's commercial ports.

== Mandate ==
The Ports Regulator was established through the National Ports Act 12 of 2005, which was promulgated in 2006. The agency is a component of South Africa's National Commercial Ports Policy.

The Regulator is responsible for, among other things:

- Economic regulation South Africa's ports, in line with the national government's strategic objectives
- Promoting equity of access to ports, and to facilities and services provided within them
- Monitor the activities of the National Ports Authority to ensure that it performs its functions in accordance with the National Ports Act
- Manage complaints and appeals under the Ports Act

== Legislation ==
Aside from the Ports Act, relevant legislation to the Ports Regulator includes:

- The National Commercial Ports Policy
- The S.A White Paper on Commercial Ports
- The National Freight Logistics Strategy
- The Regulatory Principles developed by the Ports Regulator

== See also ==
- Ports and harbours in South Africa
- Logistics in South Africa
- Transnet National Ports Authority
- The National Ports Act 12 of 2005
