= Transnet Port Terminals =

South African seaport operator

- Formerly: South African Port Operations
- Type: Division
- Industry: Transport; Logistics
- Predecessor: Portnet
- Founded: 2007; 19 years ago
- Headquarters: Durban, KwaZulu-Natal, South Africa
- Number of locations: 18 terminals (2026)
- Area served: South Africa
- Key people: Jabu Mdaki (CEO)
- Services: Maritime cargo handling Ship operations Logistics coordination
- Revenue: ▲ R20.63 billion (2026)
- Number of employees: 9,219 (2026)
- Parent: Transnet
- Website: transnet.net/TransnetPortTerminals

Transnet Port Terminals (TPT) is a South African state-owned company and an operating division of local transport and logistics company Transnet. Founded in 2007, the company is based in Durban, KZN.

TPT is responsible for managing cargo at 18 terminals, spread across seven of South Africa's eight commercial seaports, and multiple inland ports. It operates container, mineral bulk, agricultural bulk, and automotive terminals, providing services including the loading and unloading of ships, storage and handling of cargo, and the transfer of goods between ships, rail, and road transport.

== History ==
Transnet Port Terminals originated in Portnet, Transnet's ports and harbors division. In 2000, Transnet restructured Portnet into separate infrastructure and operational businesses, creating the National Ports Authority and South African Port Operations (SAPO), respectively. SAPO became responsible for operating Transnet's port terminals, while the National Ports Authority became the landlord and infrastructure authority.

SAPO subsequently expanded and upgraded its terminal operations, including major investments in container facilities at Cape Town and Durban, and infrastructure at other ports. By 2003, SAPO was operating terminals at South Africa's commercial ports and was undertaking a program to improve cargo handling efficiency and integrate port operations more closely with the wider freight supply chain.

In 2007, SAPO was renamed Transnet Port Terminals, as part of Transnet's introduction of a unified corporate identity for its operating divisions. The change was accompanied by the renaming of the National Ports Authority as Transnet National Ports Authority.

In the following years, TPT continued to invest in terminal capacity and equipment. Its operations expanded at the Port of Ngqura, where the container terminal was developed as part of the Coega port project, and at existing container, bulk, break-bulk, and automotive terminals around the country.

In the 2020s, TPT faced declining equipment availability and decreasing port productivity, prompting Transnet to pursue substantial investment and operational reforms.

In 2023, the company announced a long-term procurement and maintenance strategy with original equipment manufacturers for critical port handling equipment, including rubber-tired gantry cranes, as part of efforts to improve equipment reliability across its terminals.

== Operations ==
Transnet Port Terminals provides cargo handling services for imports, exports, and transshipments at South Africa's commercial ports. Its customers include shipping lines, freight forwarders, and cargo owners.

TPT's operations are divided into four principal cargo segments – containers, dry bulk, break-bulk, and automotive.

In the 2024–25 financial year, TPT operated 16 coastal terminals with 68 berths across seven commercial ports, as well as three inland terminals connected by rail to the ports of Richards Bay and Gqeberha. While SA has eight commercial seaports, Mossel Bay does not have a TPT terminal.

=== Containers ===
TPT operates container terminals at Cape Town, Durban, Ngqura, and Gqeberha. The terminals have a combined annual capacity of approximately 5.7 million twenty-foot equivalent units (TEUs).

=== Dry bulk ===
TPT handles mineral and agricultural bulk commodities using conveyor systems, tipplers, stackers, reclaimers, and ship loading and unloading equipment. Mineral bulk terminals are operated at Richards Bay, Port Elizabeth, and Saldanha, while agricultural bulk operations are conducted at Durban and East London.

=== Break-bulk ===
Break-bulk terminals handle commodities including steel, timber, granite, abnormal cargo, project cargo, and other general cargo. TPT operates multi-purpose terminals across all seven of its commercial ports, with some traditional bulk cargo also handled at break-bulk facilities.

=== Automotive ===
TPT operates automotive terminals at Durban, East London, and Gqeberha. These terminals handle vehicles transported to and from ships using roll-on/roll-off operations.

== See also ==
- Ports and harbours in South Africa
- Logistics in South Africa
- Transport in South Africa
