= Grindrod Limited =

South African logistics holding company

- Formerly: Grindrod Unicorn Group Limited (Grincor)
- Type: Public
- Traded as: JSE: GND
- ISIN: ZAE000072328
- Industry: Logistics in South Africa
- Founded: 1910; 116 years ago
- Founder: Captain John Grindrod
- Headquarters: Durban, KwaZulu-Natal, South Africa
- Area served: Worldwide
- Key people: Cheryl Carolus (Chairperson); Kwazi Mabaso (CEO); Fathima Ally (CFO)
- Services: Road freight transport Rail freight transport Warehousing and distribution Port and terminal operations Freight forwarding
- Revenue: ▲ R5.56 billion (2025)
- Operating income: ▲ R1.14 billion (2025)
- Net income: ▲ R2.07 billion (2025)
- Total assets: ▲ R16.13 billion (2025)
- Total equity: ▼ R9.70 billion (2025)
- Number of employees: 4,012 (2025)
- Divisions: Port and Terminals; Logistics
- Subsidiaries: Grindrod Rail; Grindrod Logistics; Grindrod Terminals; Terminal de Carvão da Matola
- Website: www.grindrod.com

Grindrod is a South African logistics holding company founded in 1910 and based in Durban, KZN. Listed on the JSE, the company operates through subsidiaries and joint ventures, with activities spanning port and terminal operations, rail freight transport, and associated logistics services.

== History ==
=== Establishment and early expansion (1910–1985) ===
Grindrod traces its origins to 1910, when Captain John Edward Grindrod established Grindrod & Company, a clearing and forwarding agency in Durban, KwaZulu-Natal. The business subsequently expanded into ships' agency services, ship chandling, and coaling. In 1922, Grindrod and Leon Renaud established a coastal shipping enterprise operating between Durban and ports along South Africa's eastern coastline. Renaud subsequently established African Coasters in 1933, which became closely associated with Grindrod's shipping operations.

In 1964, mining company Union Corporation acquired a controlling interest in African Coasters, providing capital for fleet modernization. Two years later, African Coasters merged with Smith's Coasters to form Unicorn Shipping Holdings. The business expanded further through the acquisition of Thesen's Steamship Company in 1967, strengthening its coastal shipping operations.

During the 1970s, Unicorn diversified into containerized freight transport and tanker operations. In 1971, it established a container depot in Durban and introduced a weekly container shipping service between Durban and Cape Town. The company subsequently expanded its container handling facilities to other South African ports and acquired its first large petroleum products tanker in 1973.

=== Public listing and diversification (1986–2017) ===
In 1986, the company was listed on the Johannesburg Stock Exchange through a newly established holding company, Grindrod Unicorn Group Limited, commonly known as Grincor. The restructuring returned control of Unicorn Lines to the Grindrod group and coincided with the establishment of Grindrod Terminals, marking a further expansion into cargo handling and terminal operations.

In 1999, Grindrod acquired Island View Shipping, expanding into international dry bulk shipping. The group also consolidated its interests in Unicorn Shipping, acquiring the remaining minority shareholding previously held by Safmarine. In 2001, Grindrod Unicorn Group Limited was renamed Grindrod Limited, reflecting its expansion beyond its original shipping operations.

During the 2000s, Grindrod expanded its interests in freight logistics, port infrastructure, and financial services. In 2005, it acquired Marriott Corporate Property Bank, which subsequently operated as Grindrod Bank. The following year, Grindrod acquired a 12.24% interest in the Port of Maputo in Mozambique, while investing in the expansion of the nearby Matola coal terminal. By 2007, the group had increased its interest in the Maputo Port Development Company and expanded its investments in bulk cargo and vehicle handling facilities.

During the 2010s, the company continued investing in freight infrastructure in Southern Africa. In 2015, it announced plans to expand its coal and magnetite handling capacity at Richards Bay, while pursuing further investments in the Port of Maputo and regional railway infrastructure.

=== Restructuring and divestments (2017–2024) ===
In August 2017, Grindrod announced plans to separate its international shipping business from the rest of the group. The restructuring followed a strategic review intended to allow its shipping, freight logistics, and financial services businesses to operate independently. In June 2018, the shipping division was spun off as Grindrod Shipping Holdings, a Singapore-incorporated company with a primary listing on the Nasdaq and a secondary listing on the Johannesburg Stock Exchange.

In 2022, Grindrod agreed to sell its banking business to African Bank for approximately R1.5 billion. The acquisition was completed in November of that year, ending Grindrod's involvement in banking.

In 2023, Grindrod acquired the remaining 40.3% interest in RBT Grindrod Terminals, consolidating its ownership of the Richards Bay bulk terminal business. The group also continued expanding its logistics activities across Southern Africa. In February 2024, the Mozambican government extended the concession held by the Maputo Port Development Company to operate the Port of Maputo until 2058.

In September 2024, Grindrod acquired the remaining 35% shareholding in Terminal de Carvão da Matola from the Vitol Group for approximately R1.36 billion, consolidating its ownership of the Mozambican coal export terminal.

=== Railway liberalization and recent developments (2025–present) ===
In August 2025, Grindrod was among the first private companies granted access to South African state-owned company Transnet's national freight railway network under the country's railway liberalization program. The initiative opened parts of the state-owned network to private train operators, ending Transnet's exclusive position as the country's national freight rail operator.

In May 2026, Grindrod signed a rail access agreement with the Transnet Rail Infrastructure Manager, formally authorizing its participation in the newly opened freight railway network. On 1 November 2026, it operated the first private test freight train on the Transnet network, traveling along the North-East Corridor between South Africa and Mozambique. The operation represented a significant milestone in the introduction of private freight railway operators in South Africa.

== Operations ==
As of 2026, Grindrod operates a freight logistics business focused on port infrastructure, cargo handling, rail transport, and associated logistics services, primarily across Southern and East Africa. The company operates through subsidiaries and joint ventures, and is organized into two principal divisions – Port and Terminals, and Logistics. Its operations primarily serve the mining, agricultural, manufacturing, and international trading industries.

=== Port and terminals ===
The Port and Terminals division operates dry bulk, breakbulk, container, and vehicle handling facilities at ports in South Africa, Mozambique, and Namibia. Its principal facilities include terminals at Maputo, Matola, Richards Bay, Durban, and Walvis Bay. These facilities handle commodities such as coal, minerals, agricultural products, and general cargo. The division also provides stevedoring, cargo storage, and terminal management services.

In South Africa, the company operates bulk cargo handling facilities at Richards Bay and Durban. In June 2024, Transnet selected a Grindrod-led consortium to develop and operate a container terminal at Richards Bay under a 25-year concession. The project forms part of efforts to expand private sector participation in South Africa's port infrastructure.

In Mozambique, Grindrod owns the Terminal de Carvão da Matola, a major coal export terminal, and holds a 24.7% interest in the Maputo Port Development Company, which operates the Port of Maputo under a government concession. The Matola terminal handled approximately 9.9 million tons of cargo in 2025. Grindrod also operates a vehicle terminal at Maputo and participates in container handling and logistics facilities associated with the port.

=== Logistics ===
The Logistics division provides rail freight transport, road transport, container depot services, freight forwarding, customs clearing, warehousing, and maritime services. Its rail activities include locomotive leasing, railway operations, rolling stock maintenance, and railway infrastructure management. The division operates across several African countries, including South Africa, Zimbabwe, Mozambique, and Zambia.

Grindrod's railway operations include its controlling interest in Beitbridge Bulawayo Railway, which operates a railway concession in Zimbabwe. The company also provides locomotives and rolling stock to freight operators and mining companies. In 2024, Grindrod expanded its cooperation with the National Railways of Zimbabwe to increase freight capacity, including the deployment of additional locomotives and wagons.

In 2025, Grindrod was among the first private companies granted access to Transnet's South African freight railway network. Following the signing of a rail access agreement in May 2026, the company completed its first test train operation on the North-East Corridor in November 2026, with commercial coal transportation expected to commence in 2027.

The division also operates container depots through United Container Depots, providing container storage, maintenance, refrigerated container services, and cargo handling. Its freight forwarding activities include an investment in Röhlig-Grindrod, a partnership established in 2000 with German logistics company Röhlig. Maritime services are provided through Sturrock Grindrod Maritime, which specializes in ships agency, maritime logistics, and marine engineering services.

=== Subsidiaries ===
Grindrod's principal operating subsidiaries include the following companies:

Subsidiary	Established	Sector	Ownership *	Ref
Terminal de Carvão da Matola Limitada		Coal export terminal operations	100%	
Grindrod Terminals Richards Bay Proprietary Limited		Bulk cargo terminals and port logistics	100%	
Grindrod Mozambique Limitada		Port terminals and cargo handling	100%	
Maputo Car Terminal Limitada		Vehicle terminal operations	100%	
Walvis Bay Bulk Terminals Proprietary Limited		Bulk cargo terminals	100%	
Grindrod Rail Consultancy Services Proprietary Limited		Rail operations and consultancy	100%	
Beitbridge Bulawayo Railway	1997	Railway infrastructure and freight transport	62.8%	
United Container Depots Proprietary Limited	1984	Container storage, maintenance, and logistics	100%	
Grindrod Logistics Mozambique Limitada		Container depots and intermodal logistics	100%	
Indicus Dry Terminal Limitada		Inland container terminal operations	74.3%	
Grindrod Logistics Africa Proprietary Limited		Cross-border freight and project logistics	75%	
Sturrock Grindrod Maritime Proprietary Limited	2012 (Note: The present Sturrock Grindrod Maritime business was formed through the combination of Sturrock Shipping and Grindrod Ships Agency in 2012. Its predecessor, Sturrock Shipping, was established in 1969.)	Ships agency and maritime services	75% (Note: The 75% interest relates to the South African company. Grindrod also reports wholly owned Sturrock Grindrod Maritime operations in several other countries.)	

* Ownership interests reflect the group structure published in April 2026. Establishment dates are provided where independently verifiable or disclosed in company records. These are distinguished from dates on which Grindrod acquired the businesses.

== Corporate social responsibility ==
Grindrod operates a corporate social investment program focused on education, environmental sustainability, and community development in the regions where its subsidiaries operate. The company's investment targets allocate 70% of CSI expenditure to education, 20% to environmental projects, and 10% to other community initiatives. In 2025, Grindrod reported spending R6.65 million on such projects.

Through partnerships with various associations, Grindrod has funded school infrastructure, educational resources, and university scholarships. In 2025, the company reported sponsoring 12 university students and providing school bursaries to 62 children of qualifying employees.

Grindrod's community initiatives also extend beyond South Africa. In Mozambique, Grindrod supported the development of a community education center in the Marracuene district, and partnered with organization Mozambikes to provide bicycles to schoolchildren. In Namibia, Grindrod donated educational technology to schools in the Erongo Region. Other initiatives have included food distribution, environmental conservation projects, and youth employment programs.

== See also ==
- Logistics in South Africa
