= Tschukundu =

History

South Africa
- Builder: Farocean Marine

General characteristics
- Type: Tugboat

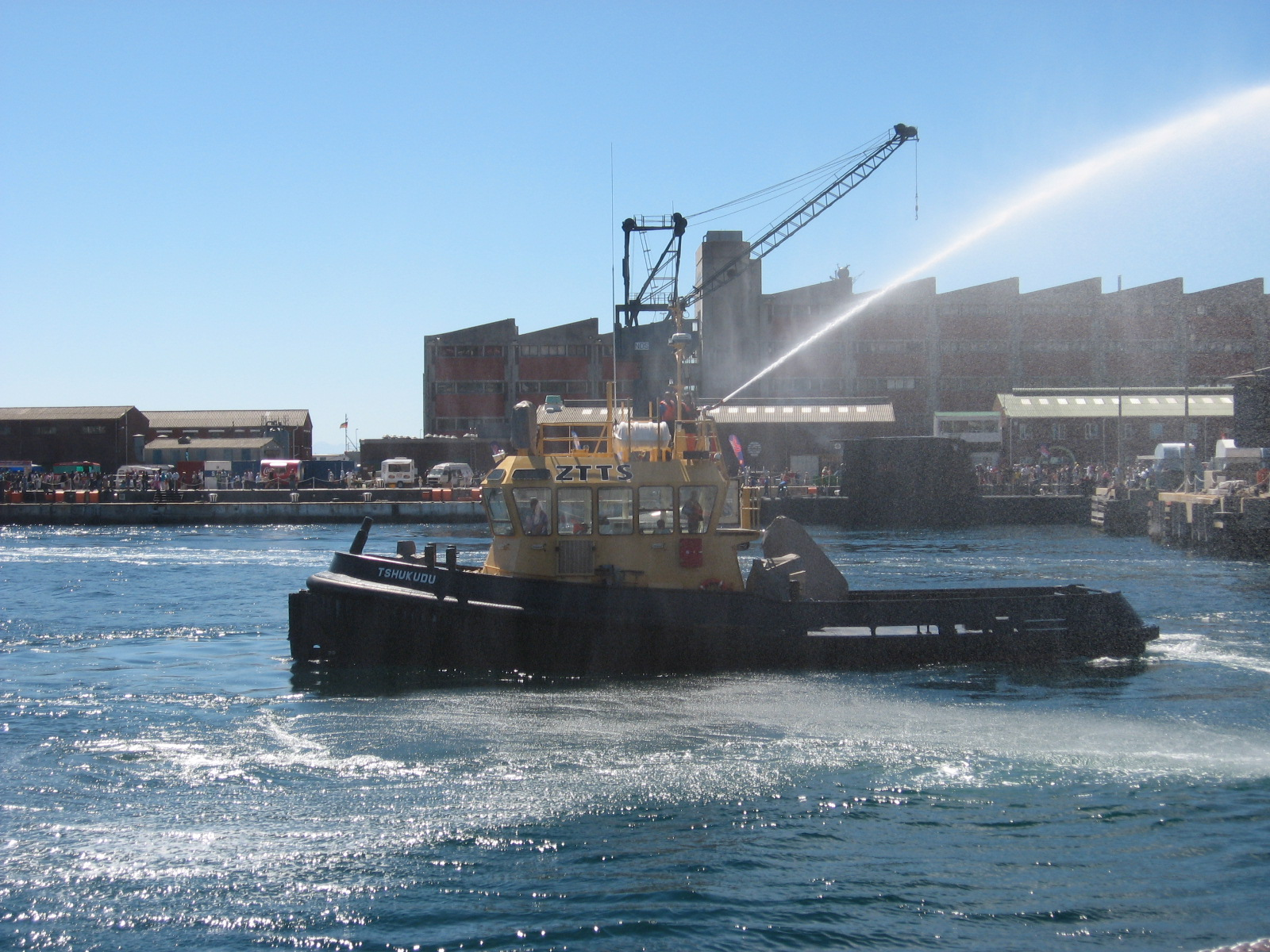

Tschukundu and Indlovu are tugboats, built in South Africa by Farocean Marine to a design from Dutch shipbuilders the Damen Group. The tug's design was based on the Damen Stan Tug 2006. The vessels have special bows for handling the South African Navy's submarines. They were delivered in February 2006 to their homeport of Simonstown.

South Africa's National Ports Authority also operates a floating crane named Indlovu, based in Durban.
