= List of ports of entry in South Africa =

External image
- Map of ports of entry in South Africa

This is a list of ports of entry in South Africa.

All ports of entry are managed by the Border Management Authority (BMA), with the exception of those located within national parks, which are managed by SANParks.

== Airports ==
=== Airports with regular scheduled international flights ===
- Cape Town International Airport (Cape Town)
- King Shaka International Airport (Durban)
- Kruger Mpumalanga International Airport (Mbombela)
- O. R. Tambo International Airport (Johannesburg)

=== Other airports with customs/immigration facilities ===
- Bram Fischer International Airport (Bloemfontein)
- Lanseria Airport
- Pilanesberg International Airport
- Polokwane International Airport (Gateway International)
- Chief Dawid Stuurman International Airport
- Upington Airport

South African Department of Home Affairs - South African Ports of Entry

== Sea ports ==
=== East coast ===
South African sea ports

- Port of Durban
- Port of East London
- Port of Mossel Bay
- Port Elizabeth
- Port of Ngqura
- Port of Richards Bay

=== West coast ===
- Port of Cape Town
- Saldanha Bay harbour

== Land ports ==
=== Botswana border ===
Botswana–South Africa border ports of entry

- Bray
- Derdepoort
- Groblersbrug
- Kopfontein
- Makopong
- Makgobbistad
- McCarthy's Rest
- Middlepits (Middelputs)
- Platjan
- Pontdrif
- Ramatlabama
- Skilpadshek
- Stockpoort
- Swartkopfontein
- Tweerivieren
- Zanzibar

=== Eswatini border (Swaziland) ===
Eswatini–South Africa border ports of entry

- Bothashoop
- Emahlathini
- Golela
- Jeppe's Reef
- Josefsdal
- Mahamba
- Mananga
- Nerston
- Onverwacht, KZN
- Oshoek
- Waverley

=== Lesotho border ===
Lesotho–South Africa border ports of entry

- Boesmansnek
- Caledonspoort
- Ficksburg Bridge
- Makhaleng Bridge
- Maseru
- Monantsa Pass
- Ongeluksnek
- Peka Bridge
- Qacha's Nek
- Ramatsilitso
- Sani Pass
- Sepapu's Gate
- Tele Bridge
- Van Rooyen's Gate

=== Mozambique border ===
Mozambique–South Africa border ports of entry

- Giriyondo
- Kosi Bay
- Lebombo
- Pafuri

=== Namibia border ===
Namibia–South Africa border ports of entry

- Alexander Bay, Northern Cape
- Gemsbok
- Nakop
- Onseepkans
- Rietfontein
- Sendelingsdrif
- Vioolsdrif

=== Zimbabwe border ===
- Beit Bridge
