= Ports and harbours in South Africa =

This list of Ports and harbours in South Africa details the ports, harbours around the coast of South Africa.

== List of ports and harbours in South Africa ==
== Port/Harbour name ==	Province	Town name	Coördinates	Remarks
East London Harbour	Eastern Cape	East London	33°1′S 27°54′E	
Gans Bay Harbour	Western Cape	Gans Bay	34°35′S 19°20′E	
Gordon's Bay Harbour	Western Cape	Gordon's Bay	34°9′S 18°51′E	
Gordon's Bay Island Harbour	Western Cape	Gordon's Bay	34°9′S 18°51′E	
Hermanus Harbour	Western Cape	Hermanus	34°26′S 19°13′E	
Hout Bay Harbour	Western Cape	Hout Bay	34°3′S 18°20′E	
Kalk Bay Harbour	Western Cape	Kalk Bay	34°7′S 18°27′E	
Knysna Harbour	Western Cape	Knysna	34°2′S 23°2′E	
Koeberg Nuclear Power Station Harbour	Western Cape	Koeberg	33°40′S 18°25′E	
Lamberts Bay Harbour	Western Cape	Lamberts Bay	32°5′S 18°18′E	
Mossel Bay Harbour	Western Cape	Mossel Bay	34°10′S 22°8′E	
Mouille Point Marina	Western Cape	Mouille Point	33°53′S 18°24′E	
Port Alfred Marina	Eastern Cape	Port Alfred	33°35′S 26°53′E	
Port of Port Elizabeth	Eastern Cape	Port Elizabeth	33°57′S 25°38′E	
Port Nolloth	Northern Cape	Port Nolloth	29°15′S 16°51′E	
Port of Cape Town	Western Cape	Cape Town	33°54′S 18°26′E	
Port of Durban	KwaZulu-Natal	Durban	29°52′S 31°2′E	
Port of Ngqura	Eastern Cape	Port Elizabeth	33°48′S 25°41′E	
Port of Richards Bay	KwaZulu-Natal	Richards Bay	28°48′S 32°5′E	
Robben Island Harbour	Western Cape	Robben Island	33°47′51″S 18°22′37″E	
Saldanha Bay Harbour	Western Cape	Saldanha Bay	33°1′S 17°57′E	
Simon's Town Harbour	Western Cape	Simon's Town	34°11′S 18°26′E	Marine Base
Struis Bay Harbour	Western Cape	Struis Bay near Cape Aghulas	34°47′S 20°3′E	
St Helena Bay Harbour	Western Cape	St Helena Bay	32°44′43″S 18°00′32″E	
