= Port of Cape Town =

Seaport of the city of Cape Town, South Africa

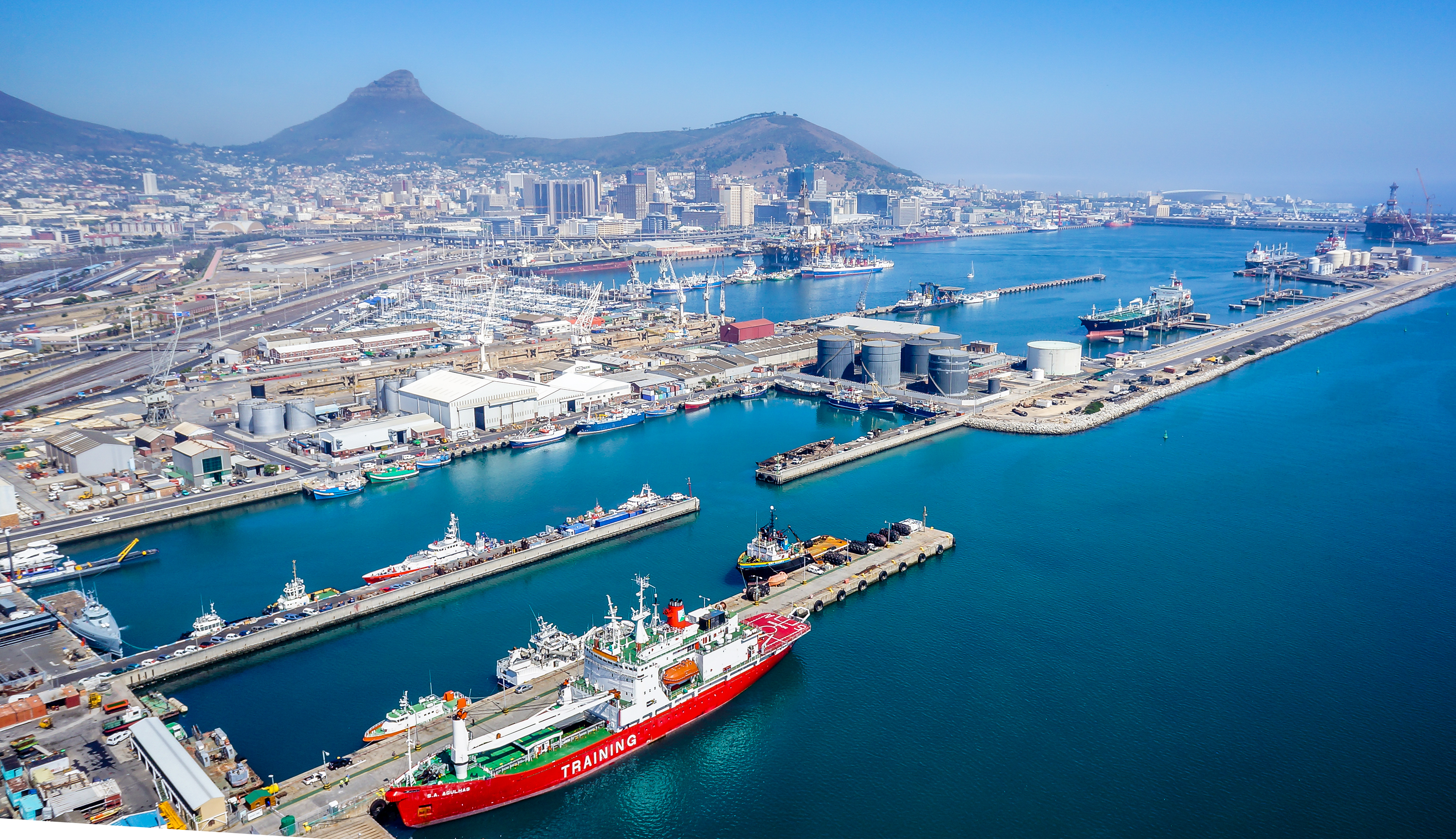
- Interactive map of Port of Cape Town
- Location within South Africa

Location
- Country: South Africa
- Location: Cape Town
- Coordinates: 33°54′S 18°26′E
- UN/LOCODE: ZACPT

Details
- Opened: 1652; 374 years ago
- Operated by: Transnet National Ports Authority
- Owned by: Transnet National Ports Authority
- Type of Harbor: Artificial
- Size of harbour: 9,163 hectares (109,590,000 sq yd)
- Land area: 253 hectares (3,030,000 sq yd)
- Size: 9,416 hectares (112,610,000 sq yd)
- No. of berths: 15

Statistics
- Annual container volume: ~ 700,000 TEU (2024)
- 2025 World Bank Container Port Performance Index: 400th (out of 400)

The Port of Cape Town is a seaport situated next to the central business district of Cape Town, South Africa. The port, which lies within Table Bay, is managed by the Transnet National Ports Authority, a subsidiary of state-owned enterprise Transnet. It is one of 8 ports in South Africa, and among its busiest, facilitating tourist and container ships. The port is also the largest in the Western Cape province.

Much of the port's land operations are situated in the Foreshore area, formed from reclaimed land when the port was rebuilt. The reclamation expanded Cape Town CBD's area significantly. It sits next to the V&A Waterfront, which has docking for private yachts in its marina, docking for tour boats near the mall, a dry dock, and cruise ship docking facilities for ships under a certain size.

The Port of Cape Town has a land area of 253 hectares (630 acres), and a water area of 9,163 hectares (22,640 acres), for a combined area of 9,416 hectares (23,270 acres). It comprises Container, Multi-Purpose and Fresh Produce terminals, the Cape Town Cruise Terminal, 15 berths (with the longest being 1,368 metres or 1,496 yards), and the ability to handle around 90 commodities on its port list.

== History ==
The history of the port follows that of Cape Town, which traces its roots back to 6 April 1652 when Jan van Riebeeck of the Dutch East India Company (VOC) established a revictualing station there. Earlier explorers had called it Table Bay from the late 15th century onwards.

The first harbour construction was a jetty built in 1654 by Jan van Riebeeck. Ships all anchored in the bay, and goods were transferred to and from the shore by smaller vessels. Table Bay is notorious for violent winter storms, when the wind blows on to a lee shore.

Massive shipping losses were sustained by the Dutch Vereenigde Oostindische Compagnie (VOC), to the extent that eventually Table Bay was closed during the winter months, and ships were ordered to use Simon's Bay (part of False Bay, where Simon's Town is now) in winter.

A vicious storm in 1858, long after the demise of the VOC, saw 30 ships blown ashore and wrecked, with huge loss of life. Lloyd's of London declined all further insurance on ships in Table Bay in winter, resulting in the British Colonial Government starting the construction, in 1860, of the first breakwater. This developed into the Victoria and Alfred Basin, the first safe harbour. There has been extensive expansion since then.

During the 2005/06 financial year, the Port of Cape Town handled 3,400 vessels for a gross tonnage of 48,778,963-gt. Total cargo handled at the port (excluding containers) was 3,718,005 tonnes; container tonnage is estimated at 9.948 million tonnes. In 2010, the port handled 719,825 TEU.

The 2022 World Bank Container Port Performance Index ranked Cape Town 344th out of the 348 ports surveyed. Shipping company Maersk announced that they would be bypassing the Port of Cape Town from December 2023 due to reliability and transit time concerns.

In the 2023 World Bank report, the Port of Cape Town slipped to bottom of the 405 ports surveyed. However, in June 2024, Transnet stated that the Performance Index contained factual errors that it had no opportunity to contest or correct.

Transnet further stated that it had met with World Bank representatives to raise these issues, and that in light of potential reputational impacts, the two parties had reached an agreement to allow measured terminals an opportunity to comment on the index in future.

In January 2024, fruit exporters threatened to sue Transnet for losses, with some fruit exports having declined 60% from the previous year as a result of the logistics problems at the port.

In July 2025, it was reported that the Cape Town Container Terminal (CTCT) achieved performance of 62% above target in the week ending 20 July. A total of 19,931 twenty-foot equivalent units (TEUs) were handled, against a target of 12,283. Since April 2025, the CTCT has consistently exceeded goals, closing the first quarter at 32% above its targeted volumes. This sustained improvement is supported by ongoing investment in terminal infrastructure, and a people-first approach in its workforce engagement.

At the end of August 2025, Transnet reported that the Cape Town Container Terminal increased its period-on-period refrigerated container volumes by 32%, and that overall export volumes had increased by 24%.

In September 2025, the first 9 of 25 new rubber-tired gantry cranes (RTGs) were introduced at the Cape Town Container Terminal. The new diesel-electric RTGs are equipped with an anti-sway system to operate in high wind conditions, and are also fitted with video cameras that provide operators with a 3D view to assist with load handling, spreader handling, and crane operation.

Other initiatives to improve efficiencies at the terminal include adding a fourth shift, a performance-based incentive scheme, and real-time performance monitoring.

In the same month, the World Bank stated that the Port of Cape Town had achieved the most improvement out of all ports globally, in the former's 2024 Container Port Performance Index (CPPI), improving by 237.9 points to rise from 405th (of 405) in 2023 to 400 (of 403) in the 2024 rankings.

In October 2025, a 25-year agreement was signed with Cape Town-based FFS Tank Terminals to operate and upgrade a key liquid bulk terminal at the port. The investment will double diesel storage capacity and expand bitumen facilities, with the aims of securing supply to local industries and supporting long-term economic growth.

In the Container Port Performance Index 2025, Cape Town remained 400th, placing it last almost the ports evaluated.

== Main areas ==
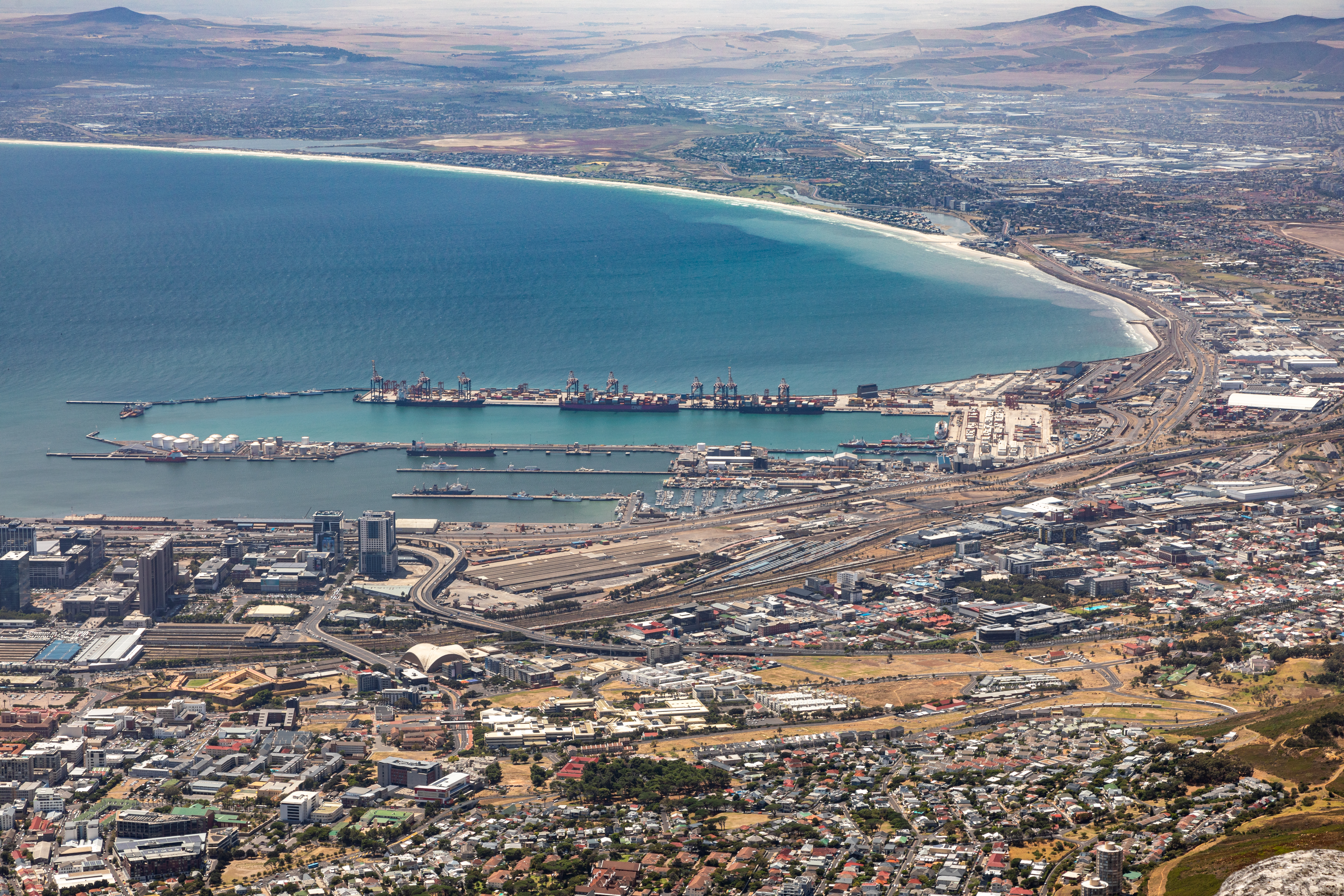
The Port of Cape Town and Table Bay (background), Foreshore (mid-left), and District Six (bottom right)

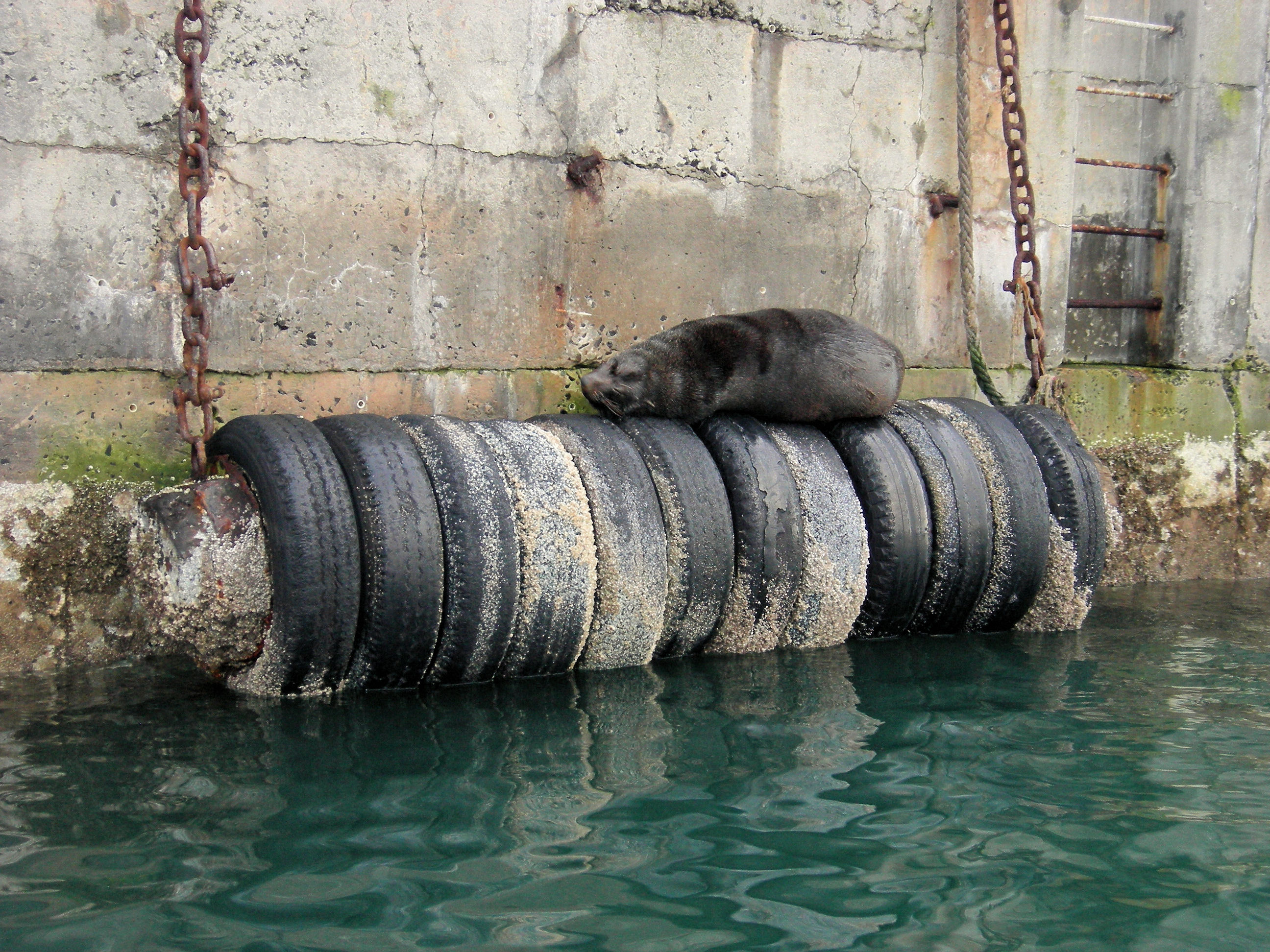
A Cape fur seal in the port

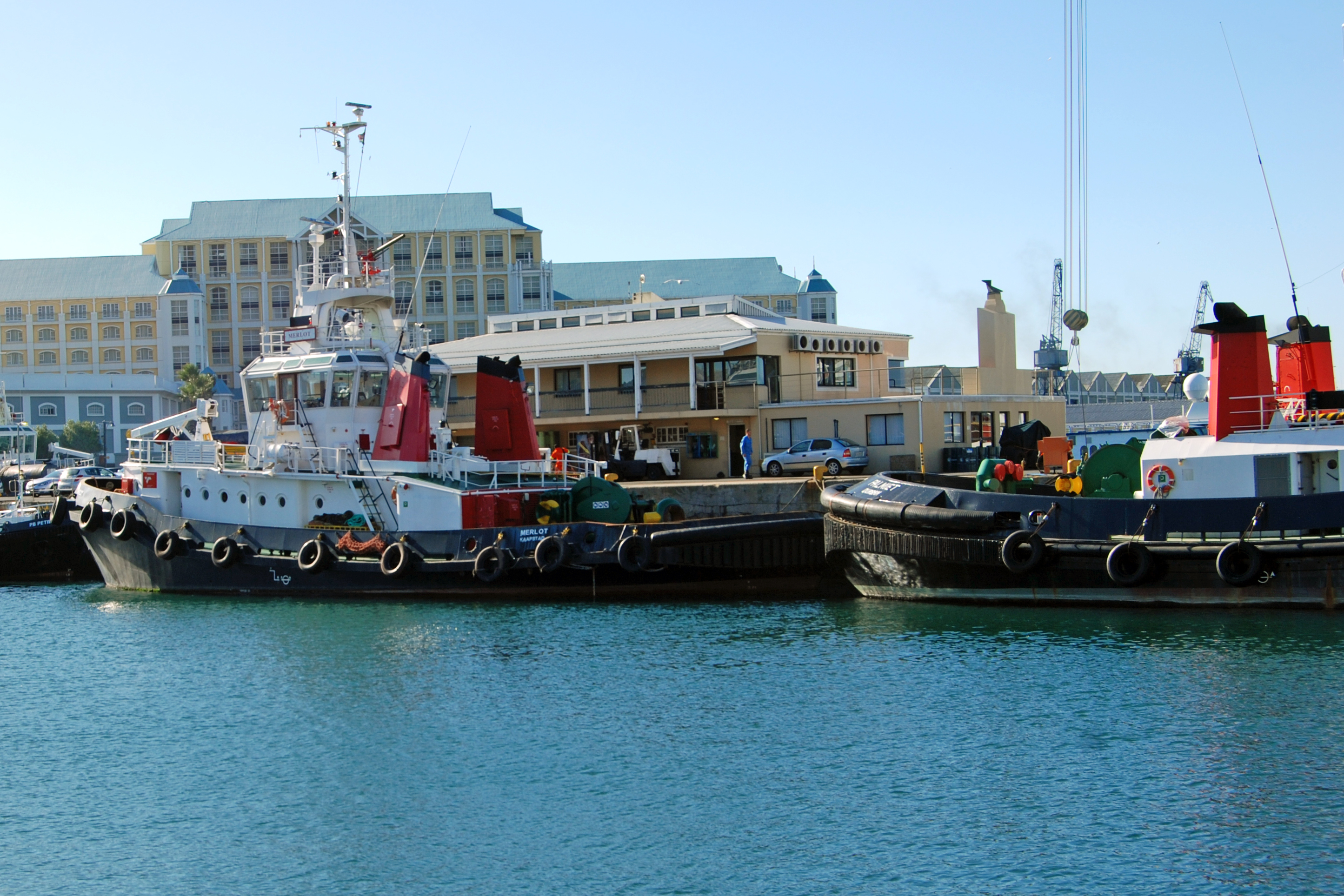
Tugboats Merlot and Palmiet, moored at Jetty 1 in the port. The Table Bay Hotel (part of the V&A Waterfront) is in the background

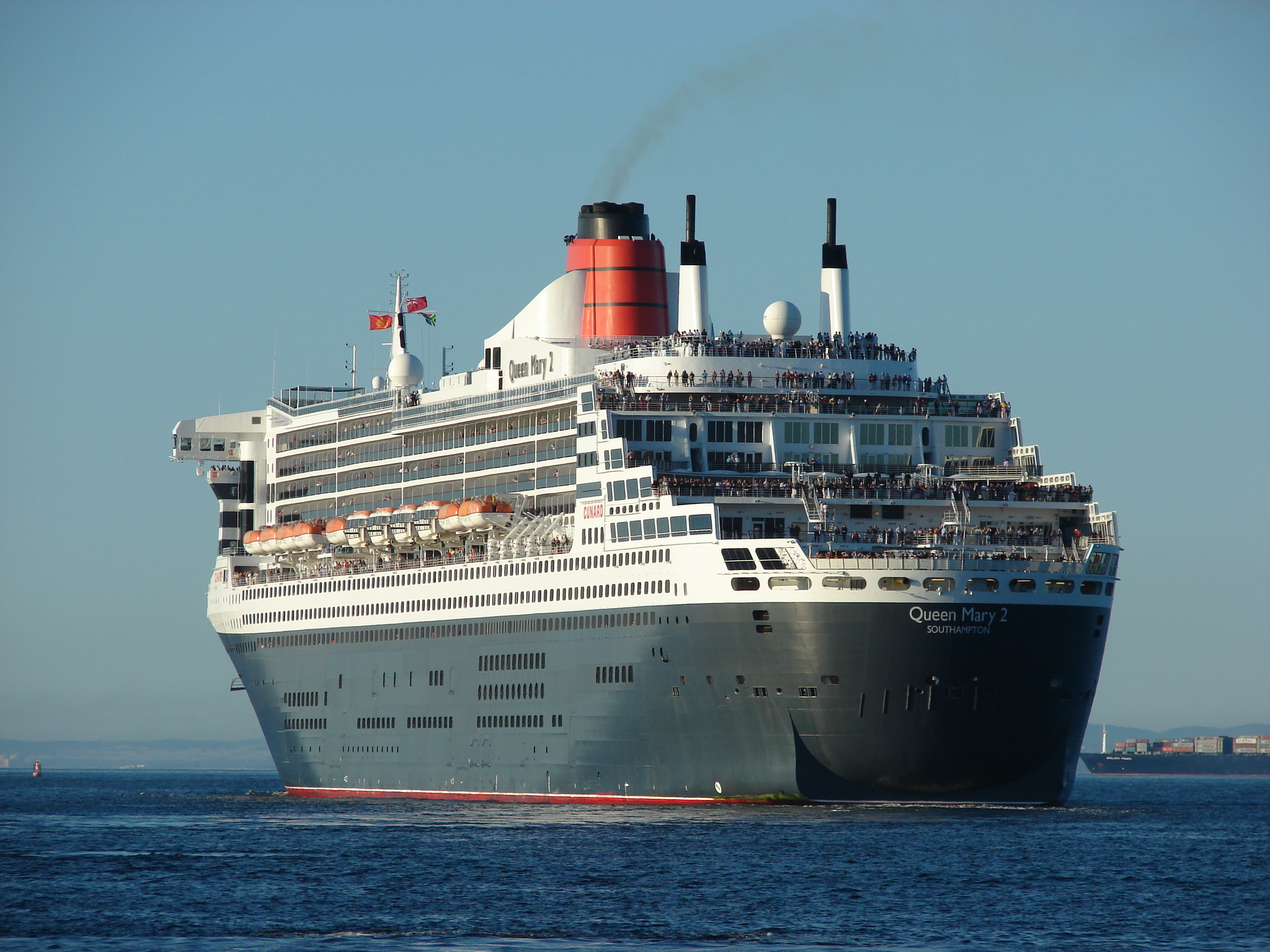
The Queen Mary 2, a British ocean liner, near the Port of Cape Town

The port evolved greatly over the centuries and currently consists of several main components:

- The Ben Schoeman Dock: This is the larger outer dock of the port, where the container terminal is situated.
- The Duncan Dock: This is the smaller and the older inner dock, containing the multi-purpose and fruit terminals as well as a dry dock, repair quay and tanker basin.
- The yachting marina.
- The Victoria and Alfred Basins: These were the main piers of the original Cape Town harbour, but now house the Victoria & Alfred Waterfront. However, these basins are still used by smaller commercial vessels such as fishing and pleasure boats and also by smaller passenger cruise ships.

== Port operations ==
Because of its position along one of the world's busiest trade routes, the Port of Cape Town is one of the busiest ports in South Africa, handling the largest amount of fresh fruit. It is second only to Durban as a container port.

The port also has significant repair and maintenance facilities that are used by several large fishing fleets. Because of the many tourist attractions offered by Cape Town and its surrounding region, many cruise ships also berth in the port.

The Port of Cape Town is home to the Cape Town Cruise Terminal, where many large cruise ships dock, forming part of the city's thriving tourism industry.

Other terminals at the Port of Cape Town include:

- Container (CTCT)
- Dry bulk (CTAR)
- Break-bulk (CTAR & FPT)
- Liquid bulk (Chevron, Grindrod, and others)
- Fabrication site (Mossgas)

The port serves the South African and West African oil and gas industries, with its specialist deep water facilities.

The port is open 24 hours a day, 7 days a week. All vessels berthing in the port require a pilot on board. Transfer is by pilot boat but plans have been made to introduce a helicopter transfer service. Several tugs, launches, workboatsm and other specialized vessels are operated by the port.

The Transnet National Ports Authority (owned by the national government) is the landlord of the port, and deals with all aspects of port management and control, compliance, and the maintenance of port infrastructure, including the quays, buildings, and the leasing of all unused land for port-related activities.

== Development ==
In January 2024, it was announced that major upgrades would be undertaken at the Port of Cape Town. These included the procurement of technical equipment to stabilize vessels during adverse weather, and a helicopter piloting service to improve efficiency and in-depth research towards a more accurate predictive model for wind - which was shutting down operations for around 1,200 hours per year.

Port of Cape Town Manager, Rajesh Dana, stated that the development of the Culemborg precinct of land adjacent to the port would enhance the port's operations significantly. The Culemborg Intermodal Logistics Precinct Development project, which is being rolled out in a phased approach, will see the precinct integrate port, road, and rail connectivity for back-of-port facilities, and enable moving cargo between Culemborg and the port.

In April 2025, the port acquired the first 9 of a total of 28 new rubber-tired gantry cranes it had ordered, which Original Equipment Manufacturer (OEM), Liebherr Africa, had begun assembling onsite. The Cape Town Container Terminal (CTCT) said the investment in new equipment would largely benefit the agricultural sectors and regional exporters. The cranes would allow operating speeds to reach up to 90 kilometres per hour (56 mph), a significant improvement over the 72 km/h (45 mph) cap of its existing 2 cranes.

Rubber-tired gantry cranes are mainly used as stacking equipment, and for moving containers between the stack and the ship-to-shore cranes. The CTCT is expected to take delivery of the next 9 cranes in November 2025, and the final 10 in June 2026.

Also in April 2025, it was announced that Transnet Port Terminals (TPT) was embarking on an ambitious development program that includes procuring new equipment and expanding capacity at the Cape Town Container Terminal, in a bid to enhance operation efficiency. The announcement was made at an engagement between TPT and the South African Chamber of Commerce and Industry (Sacci). At the time, TPT was expecting new equipment that would improve port efficiency to be delivered over the period from the end of March 2025 to May 2026. The equipment includes 7 ship-to-shore cranes.

Transnet stated at the time that, with significant demand for capacity at the terminal, it would be aligning terminal and berthing capacity to 1.4 million TEUs, and in line with that, upgrading functions such as truck staging facilities and associated processes. It was also considering realigning rail infrastructure. Western Cape Terminals stated that it wanted to grow the port's container business, and aimed to increase the Cape Town Container Terminal's landside capacity.

The Cape Town Multipurpose Terminal (CTMT) will be developed into an agricultural hub, for barley, wheat grain, and rice. CTCT will be expanded to service agricultural citrus and deciduous fruit linked to the hinterland. The Port of Cape Town will also support the hub port at the Port of Durban.

Western Cape Terminals further said that the port was looking at building additional reefer capacity for refrigerated goods and to build agility. To do so, private sector participation and two additional generators would be required.

== Gallery ==
Images of the Port of Cape Town
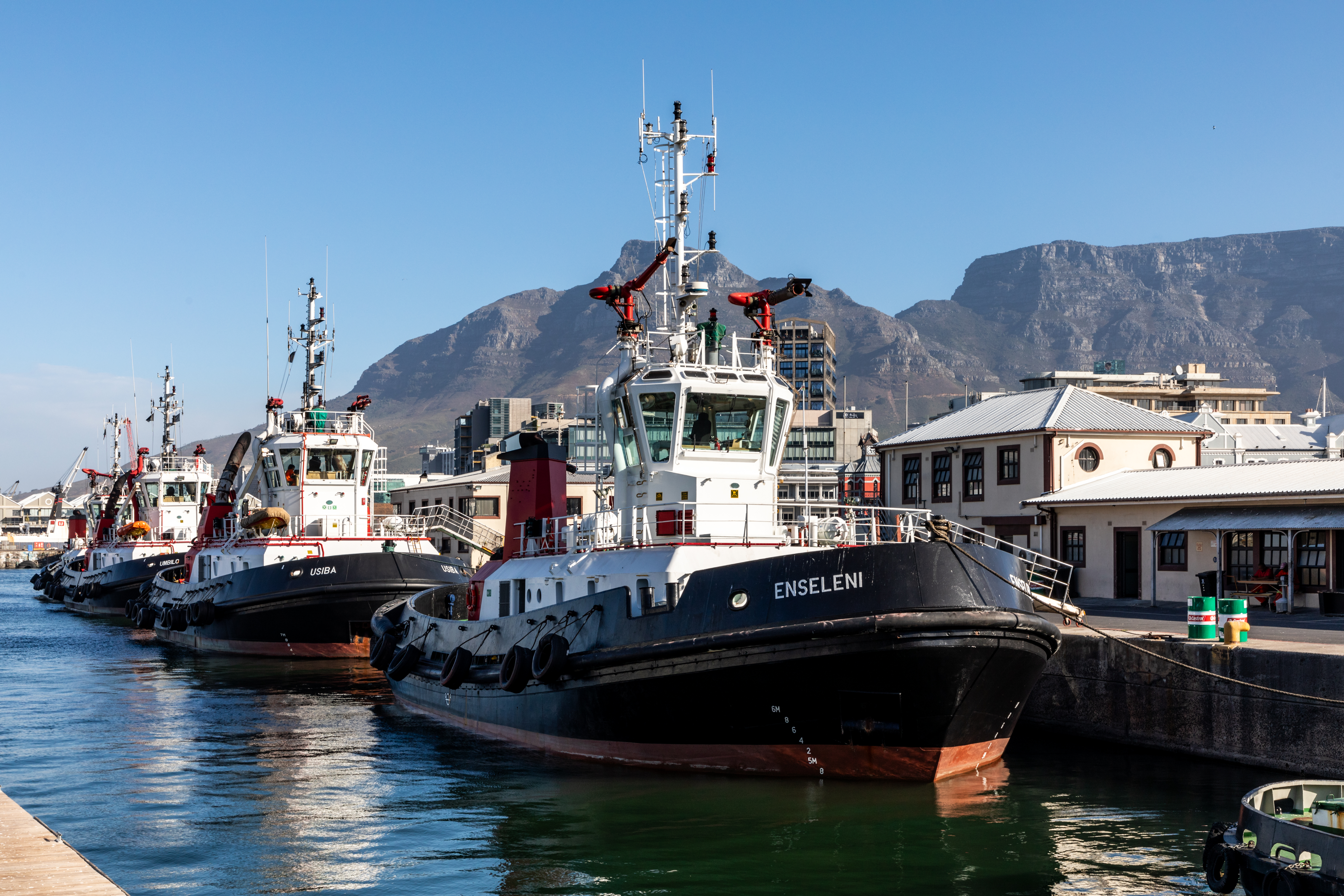
Tug boats Umbilo, Usiba, and Enseleni

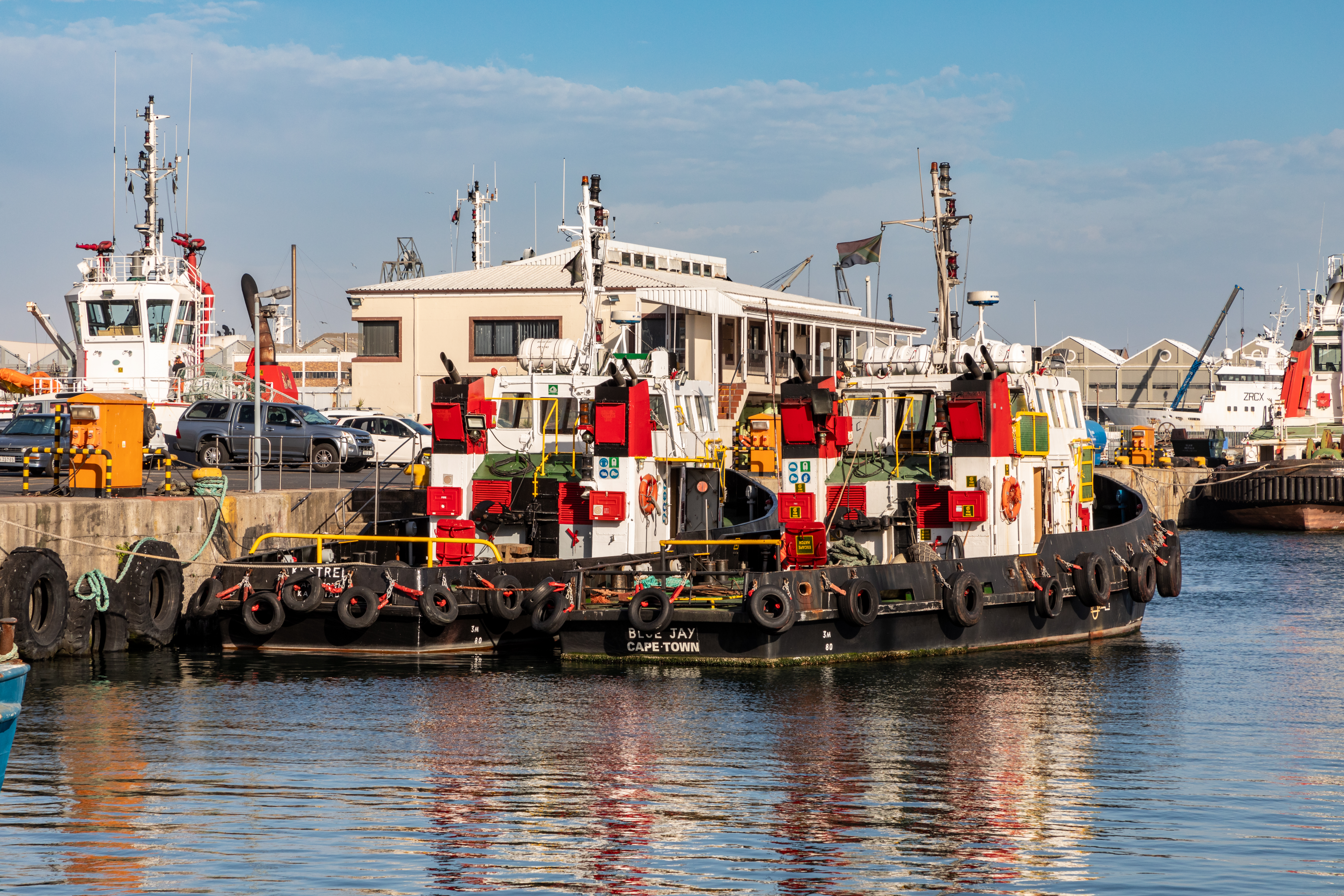
Tugboats Kestrel and Blue Jay

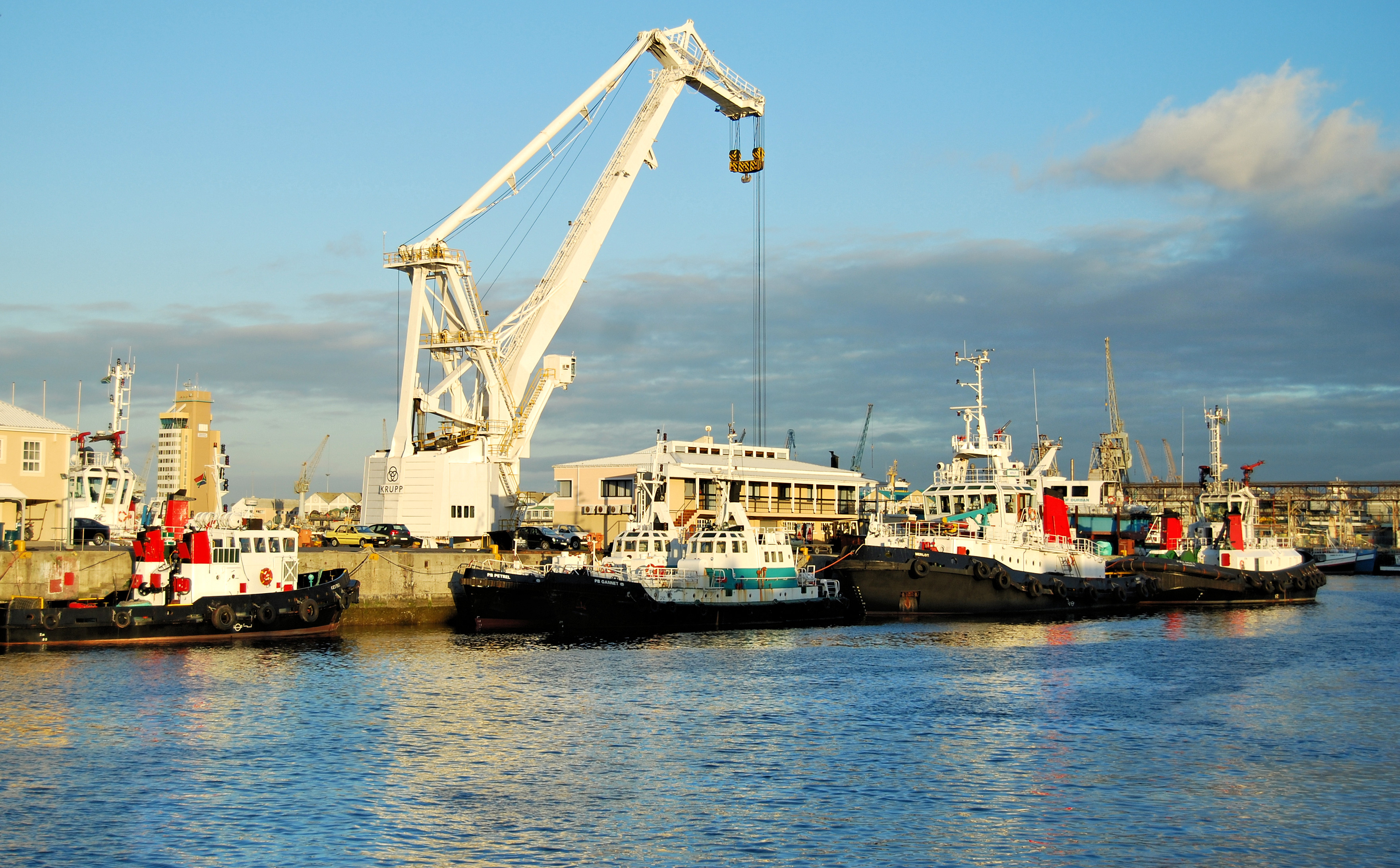
Jetty 1

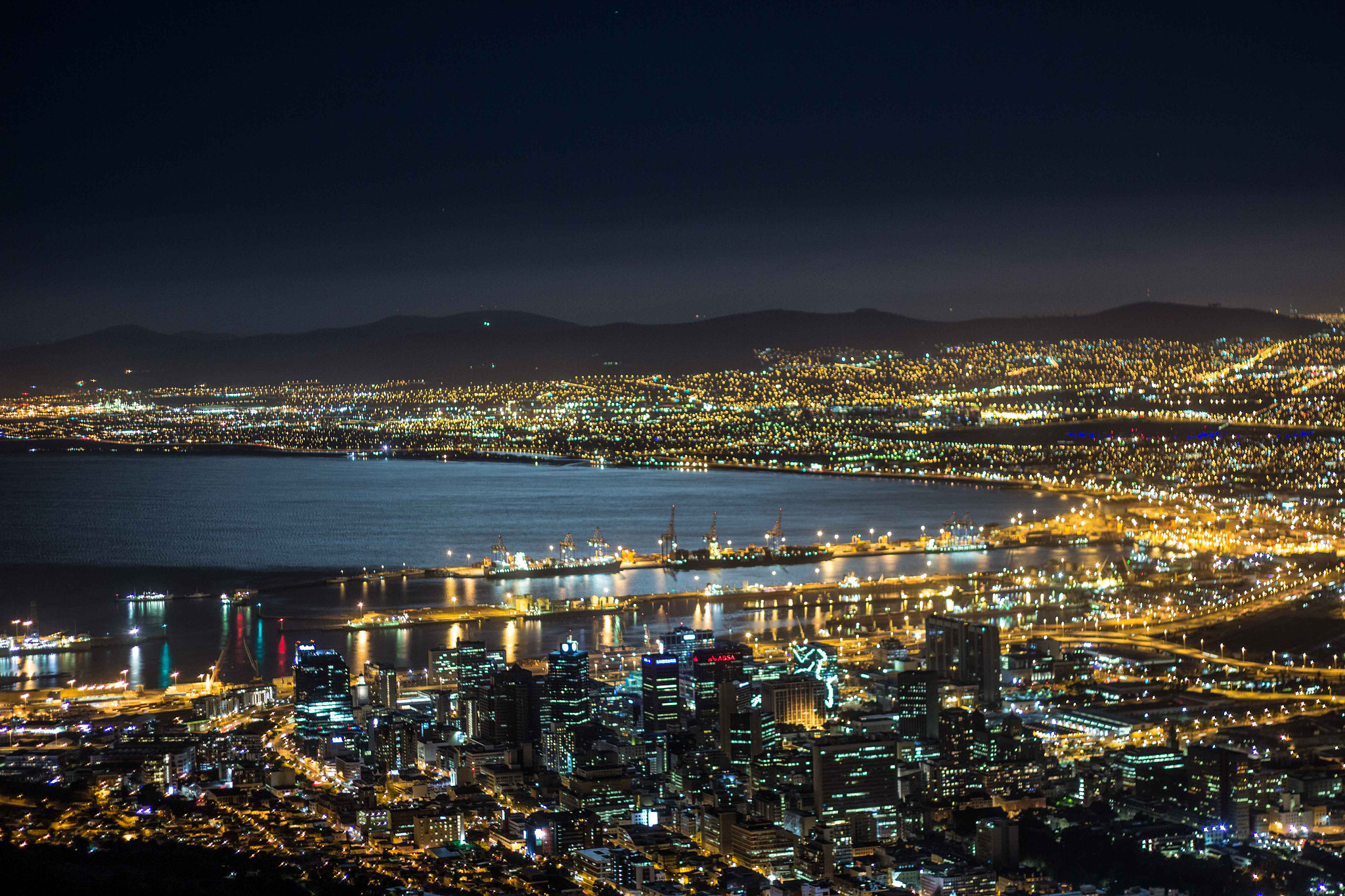
The port at night

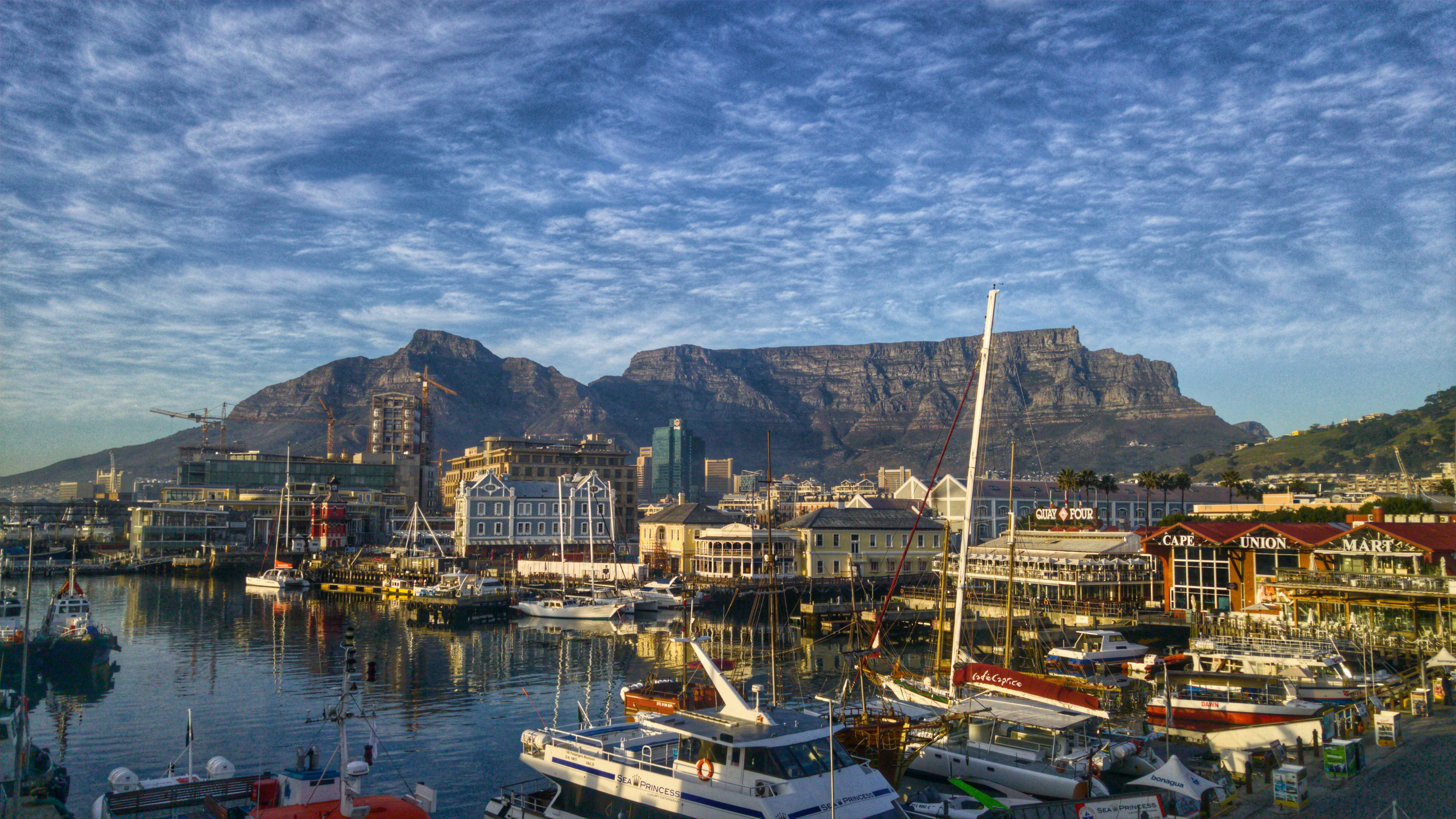
The V&A Waterfront, situated to the right of the port. Both are located in the City Bowl area, beneath Table Mountain

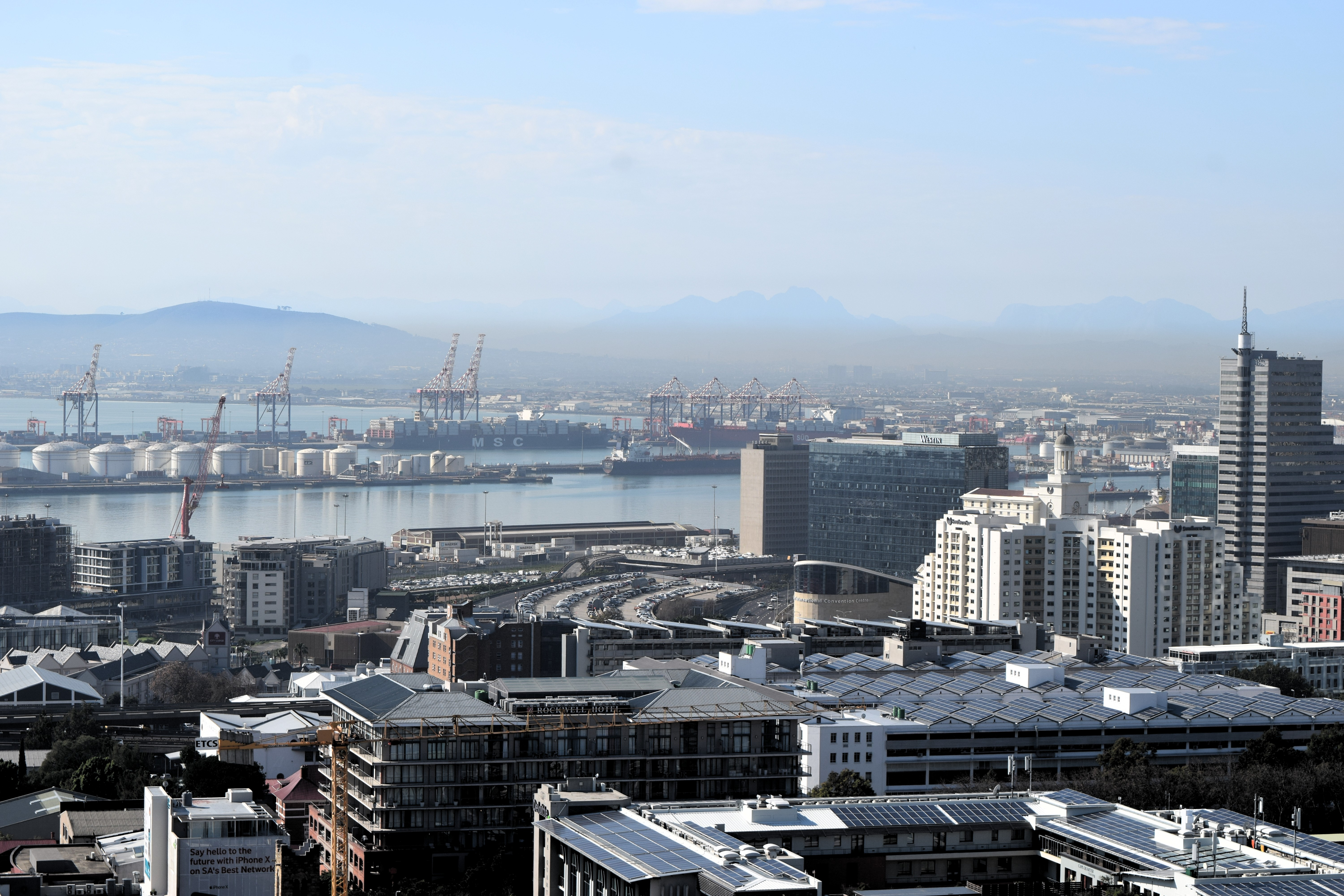
The Port of Cape Town viewed from Cape Town CBD

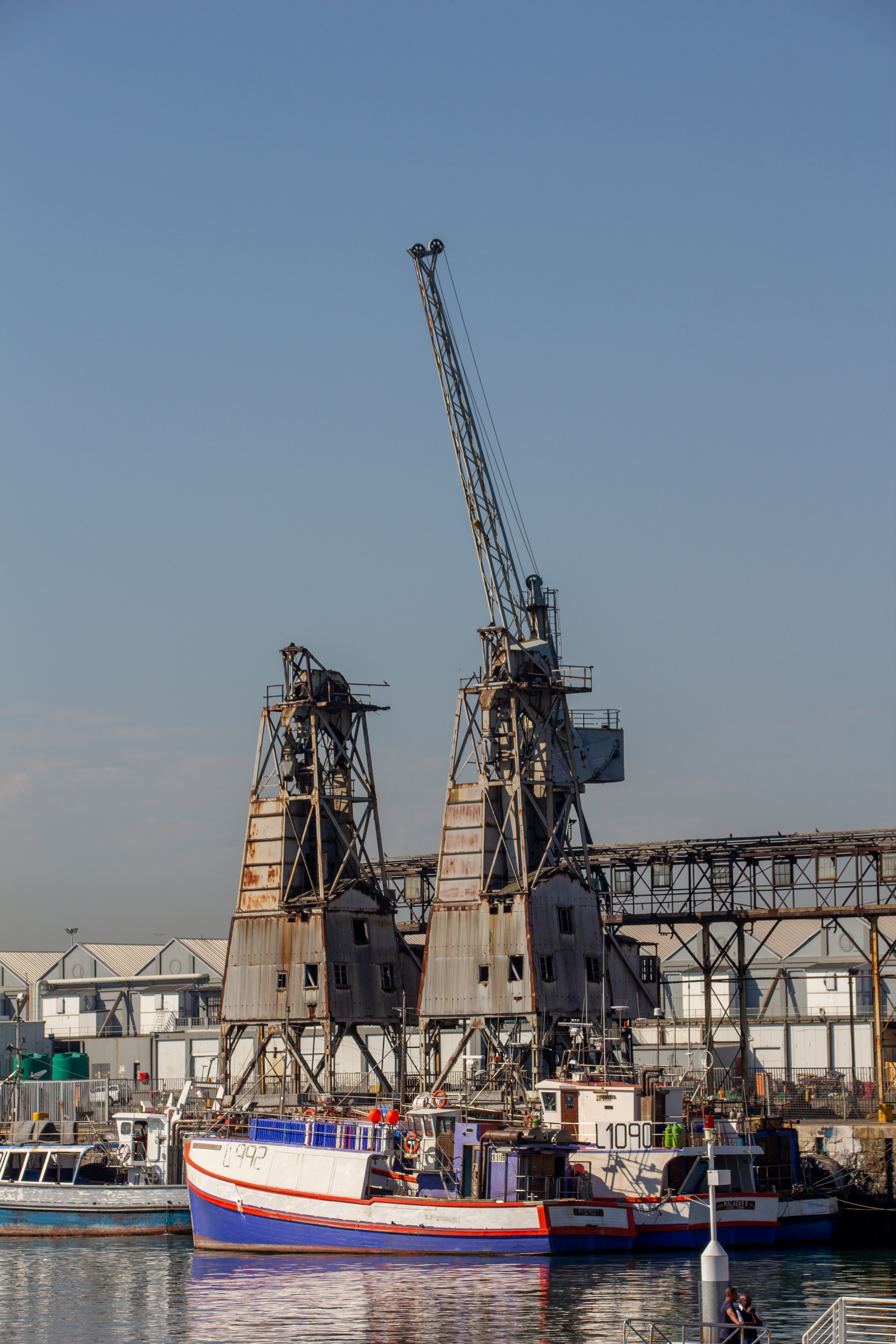
Cranes at the port

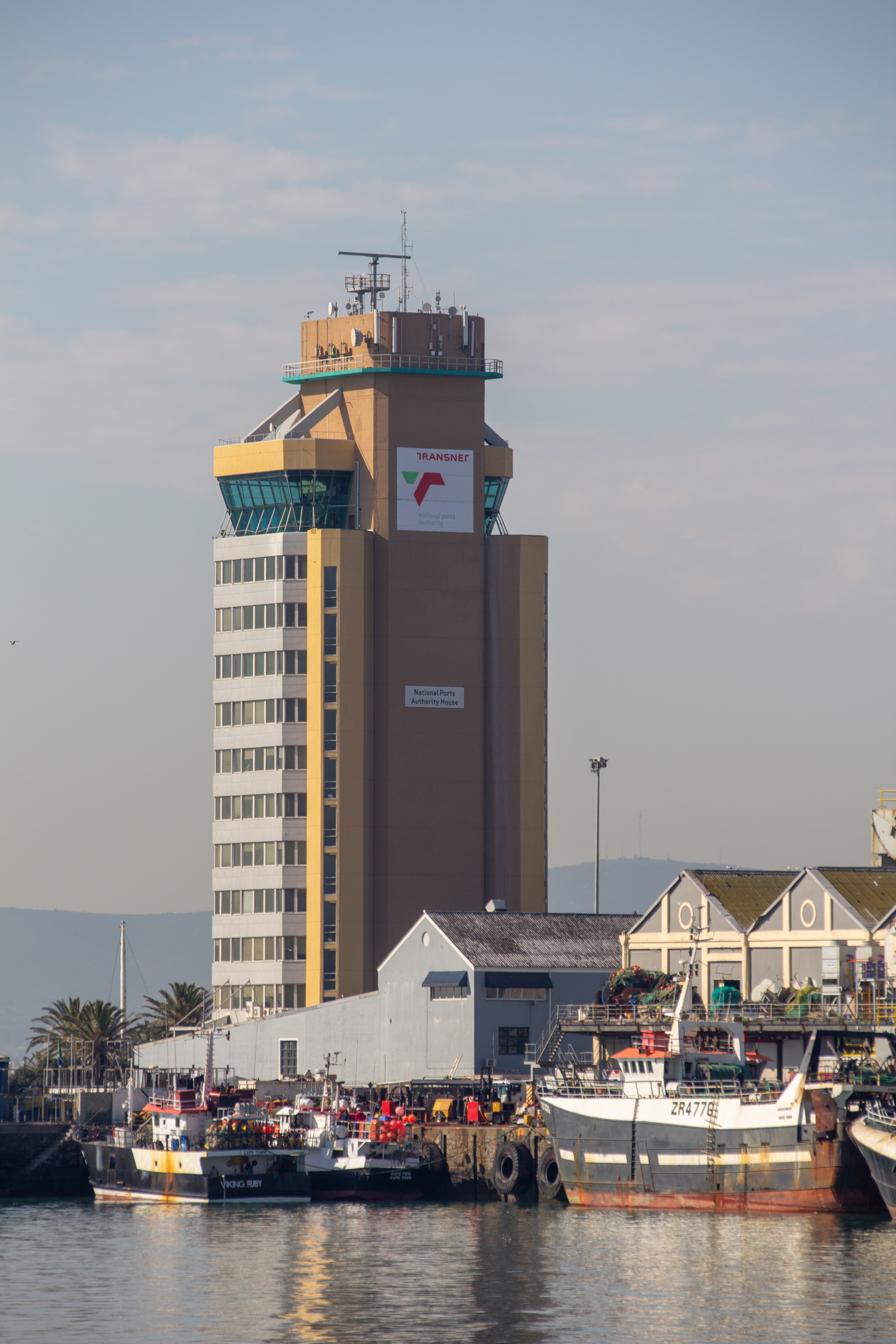
The Port of Cape Town control tower

== See also ==
- List of ports of entry in South Africa
- Logistics in South Africa
- Transport in South Africa
- Cape Town CBD
- Economy of the Western Cape
- Economy of South Africa
