= Port of Ngqura =

Seaport in the Eastern Cape, South Africa

- Interactive map of Port of Ngqura
- Location within South Africa

Location
- Country: South Africa
- Location: Nelson Mandela Bay Metropolitan Municipality
- Coordinates: 33°48′03″S 25°41′02″E
- UN/LOCODE: ZACNGQ

Details
- Opened: 2009; 17 years ago (commercially)
- Operated by: Transnet National Ports Authority
- Owned by: Transnet National Ports Authority
- Type of Harbor: Artificial
- No. of berths: 4 container berths at -16m Port Chart Datum, 2 general cargo berths at -16m Port Chart Datum and 1 general cargo berth at -18m Port Chart Datum

Statistics
- Annual container volume: 2.0 million TEU per annum (design capacity)
- Port Chart Datum: 1.026m below South African Mean Sea Level
- 2025 World Bank Container Port Performance Index: 380 (out of 400)

The Port of Ngqura is a deepwater port on the east coast (Indian Ocean) of South Africa, 20 km northeast of Gqeberha. It was authorised by an act of parliament in 2002, construction started in September 2002 and the port became operational in October 2009, when the MSC Catania docked at the port.

== Overview ==
The Port of Ngqura is South Africa's newest port and the deepest container port in the country. It has an entrance channel -18 m Port Chart Datum in depth, a turning basin of 600 m in diameter and also at -18 m Port Chart Datum, 1 general cargo berth at -18 m Port Chart Datum, and 4 container berth and 2 general cargo berth at -16 m Port Chart Datum.

The Port Chart Datum at the Port of Ngqura is 1.026 m below the South African Mean Sea Level.

The biggest container vessels to have been handled at the port are MSC's 12,500 TEU vessels.

The Port of Ngqura complements the existing ports of South Africa (mainly the twin sister port, Port of Gqeberha) and the deepwater ports in Richards Bay and Saldanha.

The first phase construction of the Port of Ngqura Greenfields project commenced in September 2002. The MSC Catania, was the first commercial vessel to berth at the port. It off-loaded 275 containers on 4 October 2009.

The Port of Ngqura forms part of the Coega Industrial Development Zone, but falls under the jurisdiction of the Transnet National Ports Authority.

The main intended function of the Port of Ngqura is to service the industrial bulk commodity requirements of the regional and national hinterland. The port was also planned to serve as a container terminal that would relieve congestion in other ports and to serve as a transhipment hub serving primarily the African East and West coast traffic and also inter-line traffic from South America to Asia.

The Port of Ngqura is a deepwater port and the medium to long term expectations are that:

- The port would attract new transhipment volumes under the container hub principle as well as handle an increasing number of Gauteng containers.
- The port will serve as a bulk port to handle commodities such as manganese, chemicals, oil and refined hydrocarbons.
- Coega Industrial Development Zone generated cargoes be handled through the port (none of these potential cargoes have been finalized).

The Port of Ngqura is the only port in South Africa that has an environmental authorization (Record of Decision or RoD) for its construction and operation.

In 2023, World Bank Container Port Performance Index, the port was ranked 404th out of 405, and in 2024 it was the fourth-most improved port, but still finished 402nd out of 403. It improved further the following year, ranking 380th out of 400.

== Environmental considerations ==
Two of the physical characteristics that had the most significant influence on the lay-out of the port, were the paleo-channel that runs through the site and Jahleel Island that is situated 1 km off-shore. The paleo channel provided an opportunity to establish a deepwater port without the need to dredge large quantities of consolidated material. This dramatically reduced capital costs associated with dredging.

The bay's birdlife, which includes a significant African penguin population was deemed to be environmentally sensitive, so construction was forbidden within 500 m of the island. The main breakwater was designed and constructed to meet the requirements of the Jahleel Island exclusion zone.

=== Sand bypass system ===
One of the coastal processes considered relevant during the design of the port was sediment transport. Littoral transport is maintained by a fixed embedded jet pump sand bypass that was a world-first. It mimics the natural long shore drift of sand along the coast of South Africa.

This is achieved by pumping the sand from the updrift (west) section of the coast to the downdrift (east) section of the coast. Sand is captured in a sand trap and the sand is pumped via pipelines to a discharge point on the opposite end of the port. Both capturing and discharge occurs in the wave zones. The system serves to prevent accretion and erosion on the western and eastern sides respectively.

== eMendi Admin Building ==
A new port administration building was launched by the Transnet National Ports Authority (TNPA) at the port on 23 June 2017. The five-storey, 10 000 m^{2} building was named eMendi in reference to the SS Mendi troop ship that sank in the English Channel a hundred years before in 1917, carrying over 800 servicemen, the majority of whom were black South Africans. The name was unveiled by TNPA Chief Executive Richard Vallihu, Chief Operating Officer Phyllis Difeto and Ngqura Port Manager Tandi Lebakeng at an event attended by port employees.

The building is a 4-star green rated building, incorporating into its design rainwater harvesting, solar panels and light motion sensors in certain areas. The building’s large window areas allow it to take advantage of the port’s panoramic views and natural lighting flowing into the building, thereby reducing the need for electrical lighting. It represents an investment of R255 million into the economy of the Eastern Cape Province, South Africa.

A lime kiln, dating back some 65 years is located outside the port side of the atrium and was declared a heritage site and protected against damage during construction. The building has a capacity for 205 staff, and is divided into east and west wings, separated by an atrium which extends the full height of the building and is serviced by two circular scenic lifts.

A porte-cochère at the entrance welcomes both staff and visitors. In addition to offices, other facilities include a gymnasium, canteen, boardrooms, training rooms, a Port Operations Centre and staff rest areas. The building includes a basement comprising parking bays as well as storage and plant rooms. There is also an open parking area outside.

== Construction ==
New technological advancements in port construction were made during the building of the quays (built in the dry), the building of the breakwaters, the use of 30 ton dolosse, and the implementation of the sand bypass system (one of only 3 in the world and unique in itself).

=== Breakwaters ===
The port is protected by two breakwaters. The western breakwater is 1.3 km in length and the eastern breakwater is 2.7 km in length. The breakwaters are rubble mound constructions with dolosse serving as armour protection. The main (eastern) breakwater is the longest in South Africa. The breakwaters and dolosse were constructed and placed from September 2002 to February 2006.

The crest of the breakwaters at the Port of Ngqura has been formed by 26,500 30-ton dolosse. The dolosse used at the Port of Ngqura weighed 30 tonnes each and they were the largest in the world at their time of construction. They were designed and developed in-house by Transnet National Ports Authority. Approximately 26,500 units were placed- each one 13 m^{3} in volume. These structures combined used approximately 344,500 m^{3} of concrete (or 826,800 tons).

A crane driver using a global positioning system (GPS) fitted to the end of his crane ensured that each of the two-storey tall structures was precisely placed to meet to the calculated coordinates of the model studies.

The dolosse protect the breakwaters by dissipating rather than blocking the energy of incoming waves. Most of the wave action energy is deflected to the side by their angular design. Over time the structures settle and lock into place as the waves subtly shift them. Together, they form an interlocking yet porous wall that grows stronger with time.

A double layer of 30 ton dolosse units was placed along the exposed side of the breakwaters and a single layer was placed along the leeward side of the main breakwater.

The construction of the eastern breakwater water was a 24-hour operation with rock being tipped at a peak-time rate of a 40-ton truckload every three minutes. 800 ton crawler cranes mounted on portal crawlers were used to place the dolosse on the rubble mound breakwaters. The portal crawlers were constructed high enough to allow the haul trucks access to the construction face where back tipping and skip placement of rock was carried out on a 24-hour cycle.

== Rail links ==
Transnet is upgrading a rail corridor which will connect Ngqura with manganese mines around Hotazel in the Northern Cape. The corridor would be 1,003 km long, and would mostly involve upgrades of existing rail lines; capacity is expected to increase from 5·5 million tonnes / year to 16 mpta.

== See also ==
- Transport in South Africa
- Logistics in South Africa
- Coega
- 2021 Transnet Cyberattack
