= Transnet =

South African state-owned transport and logistics company

Transnet SOC Ltd.
- Type: State-owned enterprise
- Industry: Rail transport Port management Logistics; Pipeline management
- Predecessor: SAR&H
- Founded: April 1990; 36 years ago
- Headquarters: Johannesburg, Gauteng, South Africa
- Area served: South Africa
- Key people: Andile Sangqu (Chairperson)
- Revenue: ▲ R88.6 billion (2025/26)
- Operating income: ▲ R20 billion (2025/26)
- Net income: ▲ R4.6 billion (2025/26)
- Total assets: ▲ R375.3 billion (2025/26)
- Total equity: ▲ R142.5 billion (2025/26)
- Number of employees: 44,544 (2025/26)
- Divisions: Transnet Engineering; Transnet Freight Rail; Transnet National Ports Authority; Transnet Pipelines; Transnet Port Terminals; Transnet Property; Transnet Rail Infrastructure Manager
- Website: transnet.net

Transnet is a major South African state-owned transport and logistics company. Founded in 1990 and based in Johannesburg, Transnet has interests in rail infrastructure and management, port operations, and pipelines.

== History ==
=== Railway development ===
Railways were first developed in the area surrounding Cape Town and later in Durban around the 1840s. The first line opened in Durban on 27 June 1860. The initial network was created to serve the agricultural production area between Cape Town and Wellington.

The news that there were gold deposits in the Transvaal Republic moved the Cape Colony Government (supported by British Government) to link Kimberley as soon as possible by rail to Cape Town as part of the colonial dream.

In the Union of South Africa (31 May 1910 – 31 May 1961), consisting of the four earlier colonies: the Cape of Good Hope, Natal, Orange Free State and Transvaal; all railways in South Africa finally became unified as a state-owned railway system in 1910 when the Central South African Railways, the Cape Government Railways and the Natal Government Railways were all fused by an Act of Parliament (South Africa Act 1909). Thus was born the South African Railways and Harbours (SAR&H).

=== South African Transport Services ===
On 31 May 1961, the Union became the Republic of South Africa. By 1981 government decided that the SAR&H should restructure itself along business lines in order to evolve from a state-owned corporation towards privatization. Later, when commercial aviation started, the South African Airways also became a part of this huge land, sea and air transport system.

Integral to the process was a change in the name and image of the organization, which would reflect its new mission as a state business enterprise. In April 1981, the country's railway, harbour, road transport, aviation and pipeline operations became known as South African Transport Services (SATS). At the same time, the enterprise was restructured into units and divisions with strong emphasis placed on localized management.

The Legal Succession to the South African Transport Services Act, 1989 transformed the South African Transport Services from a government department into a public company. On 1 April 1990, after 80 years of government and parliamentary control, SATS received company status.

=== 2010s ===
In December 2013, Transnet appointed nine black-owned companies to supply it with fuel over the following five years in a $1.5 billion deal aimed at promoting the South African government's black economic empowerment drive.

On 17 March 2014, Transnet's CEO, Brian Molefe, announced contracts of R50 billion with four international manufacturing companies to build 1,064 locomotives (465 diesel and 599 electric). GE would supply 233 diesel locomotives, CNR 232 diesel locomotives, Bombardier Transportation 240 electric locomotives and CSR 359 electric locomotives. Of the total of 1,064 locomotives, 70 would be imported complete and the rest would be built locally by Transnet Engineering in Pretoria and Durban.

The alternators of the first two diesel locomotives delivered to Transnet by China's state-owned CRRC Corporation, posed serious problems soon after they arrived in South Africa the previous year, rendering the locomotives unable to operate. Transnet is now refusing to accept a further 18 locomotives that are waiting to be shipped to South Africa.

Transnet subsequently terminated its contracts with Brian Molefe and his successor Siyabonga Gama. A forensic report states Molefe misled the Transnet board into approving costs. Molefe and three others increased the locomotive deal by at least R16 billion to R54 billion. By late 2018, both were under criminal investigation.

The organization fired Gama in October 2018 on the basis that it required a trustworthy CEO. In June 2020 it was reported in the Daily Maverick that three senior executives (Nonkululeko Sishi, Lenny Moodley and Shulami Qalinge) implicated in facilitating state capture had been dismissed. On 27 May 2022, Gama, along with four other executives, was arrested by the National Prosecuting Authority on charges of corruption, fraud and money laundering, and granted bail ahead of another court hearing in July 2022.

=== 2020s ===
On 22 July 2021, Transnet experienced "an act of cyberattack, security intrusion and sabotage," that caused it to declare force majeure at several key container terminals, including its Durban, Ngqura, Port Elizabeth and Cape Town harbors. The Durban port handles 60% of South African container traffic. As of 26 July most computer systems had been restored, but Transnet's investigation into the attack's severity continued.

In September 2024, President Cyril Ramaphosa instructed the SIU to investigate allegations of maladministration related to Siyabonga Gama's reinstatement as CEO of Transnet Freight Rail in February 2011.

== Divisions ==
The primary divisions of Transnet include:

- Transnet National Ports Authority (NPA)
- Transnet Port Terminals (formerly SAPO)
- Transnet Pipelines
- Transnet Freight Rail
- Transnet Engineering
- Transnet Rail Infrastructure Manager
- Transnet Property

== See also ==
- Metrorail
- Passenger Rail Agency of South Africa
- Petroleum industry in South Africa
- Logistics in South Africa
- Transport in South Africa
