= Logistics in South Africa =

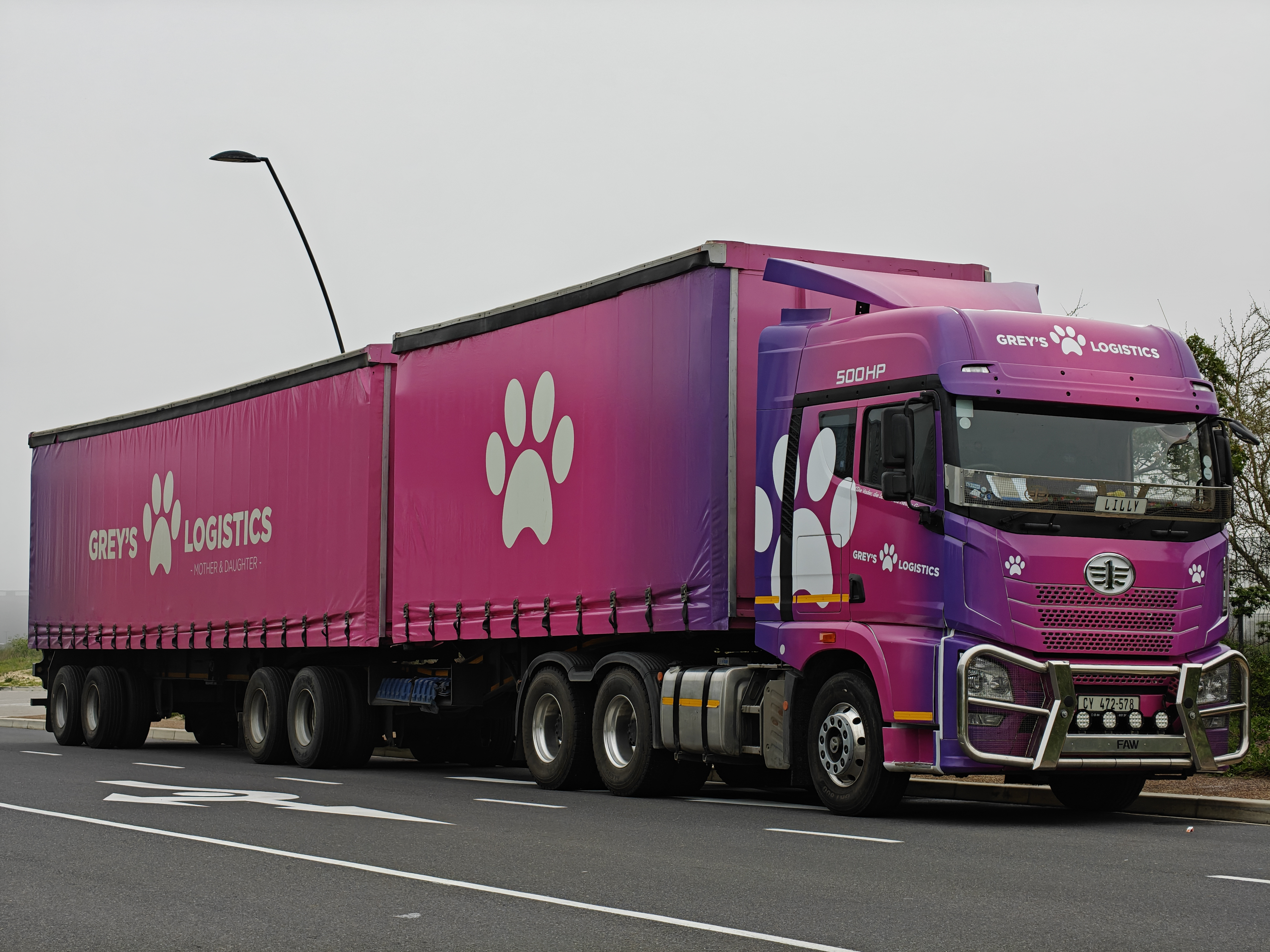
Freight semi-truck in Milnerton, a suburb of Cape Town containing numerous large warehouses

South Africa has an extensive logistics industry that supports the country's global trade competitiveness and economic integration. In 2024, the sector generated over half a trillion rand in annual economic output.

The country has a robust logistics industry, the network of which supports its supply chain, from manufacturing to the point of consumption. As in other developed countries, SA's logistics sector consists of, among other things, physical infrastructure such as trucks, warehouses and other storage facilities, local and international courier companies, institutional knowledge, and a multimodal transport system including airports, sea ports, rail freight, and road freight systems.

As of 2026, according to the World Bank, South Africa's logistics infrastructure and performance indices rank highly, continue to increase, and are comparable to those of China and the United States. In the 2023 World Bank Logistics Performance Index, South Africa ranked joint 19th place, out of 139 countries - an increase of 14 places since the previous year.

In recent years, the country's logistics, and in particular its freight sector, has shifted away from state-owned operations and infrastructure, and more towards public investment and public private partnerships.

== Economic significance ==
In 2024, South Africa's logistics sector contributed R518.4 billion towards the country's GDP, a year-over-year increase of 4.3%.

South Africa's logistics sector is expected to grow at a CAGR of 9.1% from 2026 to 2033. In 2025, the country accounted for 2.3% of the global logistics market. In 2026, South Africa's logistics sector was growing the fastest out of all countries in the Middle East & Africa region.

Examples from Wesgro of the South African logistics sector's impact on the country's economy as a whole are in the table below.

Sector	The role of logistics	Logistics requirements
Agriculture	Inputs and products transported between processing sites and markets; supports export value chains (e.g., citrus, wine).	Cold-chain logistics; reliable road and rail corridors; and reliable port access
Construction	Transporting heavy machinery and building materials to sites	Heavy-haul transport capacity; dependable roadways; and efficient scheduling and delivery
Fishing	Distribution of seafood to domestic and export markets	Cold storage; efficient ports; access to airfreight for perishable products
Manufacturing	Enables a supply of raw materials and distribution of finished goods	Predictable inbound logistics; efficient distribution networks
Mining	Bulk commodities transported from mines to ports and processing hubs	Multimodal, integrated transit systems; high-capacity corridors; operational reliability
Pharmaceuticals & medical supplies	Secure, on-time delivery of essential goods	Secure transport; time-critical logistics and cold-chain for temperature-sensitive products
Retail & e-commerce	Enables fast, reliable delivery and replenishment of goods	Robust warehousing and fulfilment facilities; courier networks; last-mile delivery network; tracking of goods

In terms of provincial impact, Gauteng contributed 34.7% of South Africa freight and logistics market activity in 2025. This was followed by the Western Cape, at 19.6%.

== Industry structure ==
=== Major players ===
In terms of companies engaging directly in logistics, the sector in SA is highly competitive, with no dominant players. Among companies operating in the market are SA-based Transnet, Grindrod, and Super Group; UAE-based DP World (including its SA subsidiary Imperial Logistics); Switzerland-based Kuehne+Nagel; German-based DHL Group; and Denmark-based DSV (including German subsidiary DB Schenker).

Equites, a South African JSE-listed real estate investment trust (REIT), is focused entirely on the logistics sector. In 2026, the company held a total of 59 logistics-related properties worth around R30 billion.

Modal share of South Africa's land freight transport (2025 data)
1. Road freight (85.0%)
2. Rail freight (15.0%)

=== Freight transport ===
South Africa's logistics sector consists of a combination of freight transport routes, including those by road, rail, air, and sea, which are shared by private and state-owned logistics companies.

State-owned Transnet owns, and for the most part manages, South Africa's rail and seaport assets. As of 2023, the total value of those assets was R7.5 billion.

=== Warehousing and distribution ===
Warehousing and distribution are major logistics segments, and are among the fastest-growing logistics services in South Africa. Demand for these facilities is being driven in part by local and foreign retailers upgrading supply chains, third party logistics providers increasing fulfilment capacity due to the growth of ecommerce, and FMCG companies developing more modern, efficient facilities.

Numerous developers have constructed large (30,000 sqm+) warehouse facilities along the N3 and N1 corridors, to facilitate the storage and distribution of consumer goods, including those from e-commerce companies. These warehouses support a retail sector that in 2024 was worth approximately R1.4 trillion. The presence of e-commerce companies such as Takealot, Amazon, AliExpress, Temu, and Shein continues to grow in South Africa, and these companies make extensive use of warehousing.

South Africa's food storage capacity as a proportion of production is high, and only slightly behind China's, despite having a population that is 21 times smaller.

Warehousing in South Africa is shifting from passive storage to technology-intensive logistics operations. Automation, inventory optimization, and e-commerce fulfilment are driving value-added services beyond traditional storage. Cold chain storage in South Africa is growing, supported by the food and pharmaceutical industries. South Africa's cold chain storage sector is the largest and most mature in Africa.

As of 2025, prime rent for warehousing averaged around R100 per sqm, and the average yield (return) was 8.25%.

Warehouses tend to be concentrated in and around South Africa's largest cities - most notably Durban, Johannesburg, and Cape Town. The primary use varies between cities. For example, Durban and Cape Town's warehouses, which are close to the ocean, are focused on export markets. Meanwhile, Joburg's warehouses are focused on inland distribution. Johannesburg has the largest concentration of warehousing facilities in South Africa.

Examples of suburbs within major metros that have high concentrations of warehousing facilities are:

- Cape Town: Montague Gardens, Epping Industria, Airport Industria
- Durban: Prospecton, Riverhorse Valley, Springfield Park
- Johannesburg: City Deep, Isando, Jet Park

=== Courier services ===
There are a large number of local and international courier companies operating in South Africa, delivering documents and parcels on-demand for individuals and commercial entities. These companies provide services such as domestic and international delivery, cross-border e-commerce logistics, customs clearance, freight forwarding, warehousing, distribution, and last-mile parcel delivery. Courier companies operating in SA include:

Company type	Courier company	Parent company	HQ of parent company	Established in SA	Reference
SA companies	Aerospeed Couriers		Johannesburg, SA	1993; 33 years ago	
SA companies	BEX Express		Johannesburg, SA	1994; 32 years ago	
SA companies	Buffalo International		Johannesburg, SA	2017; 9 years ago	
SA companies	CCD Couriers		Johannesburg, SA	1995; 31 years ago	
SA companies	Collivery		Johannesburg, SA	1991; 35 years ago	
SA companies	CourierIT	The Courier Guy	Johannesburg, SA	2000; 26 years ago	
SA companies	Fastway Couriers	City Logistics	Johannesburg, SA		
SA companies	Internet Express		Johannesburg, SA	1999; 27 years ago	
SA companies	RAM Hand-to-Hand Couriers		Johannesburg, SA	1988; 38 years ago	
SA companies	The Courier Guy		Johannesburg, SA	2000; 26 years ago	
Foreign companies	Aramex		Dubai, UAE	1992; 34 years ago	
Foreign companies	DHL	DHL Group	Bonn, Germany	1978; 48 years ago	
Foreign companies	DPD Laser	Geopost	Issy-les-Moulineaux, France	1989; 37 years ago	
Foreign companies	FedEx	FedEx Corporation	Memphis, USA	1989; 37 years ago	
Foreign companies	UPS	United Parcel Service	Atlanta, USA	1988; 38 years ago	

=== Mail and other parcel services ===
The government-owned South African Post Office (SAPO) is the primary provider of letter delivery. However, as in other countries, this means of delivering information has declined as digital communications have become preferred by many. In 2025, SAPO processed 142.7 million pieces of mail.

PostNet South Africa operates the local master franchise of American company PostNet. As of 2026, there are over 500 owner-operated PostNet locations across South Africa. These outlets offer services including mailboxes, and both local and international parcel delivery. Courier partners include DHL and Aramex.

Various companies operate automated parcel locker facilities and/or staffed pickup points inside retail outlets, in South Africa's major cities. These include Pargo, Bob Box, and PUDO (which is owned by The Courier Guy).

== Freight transport ==
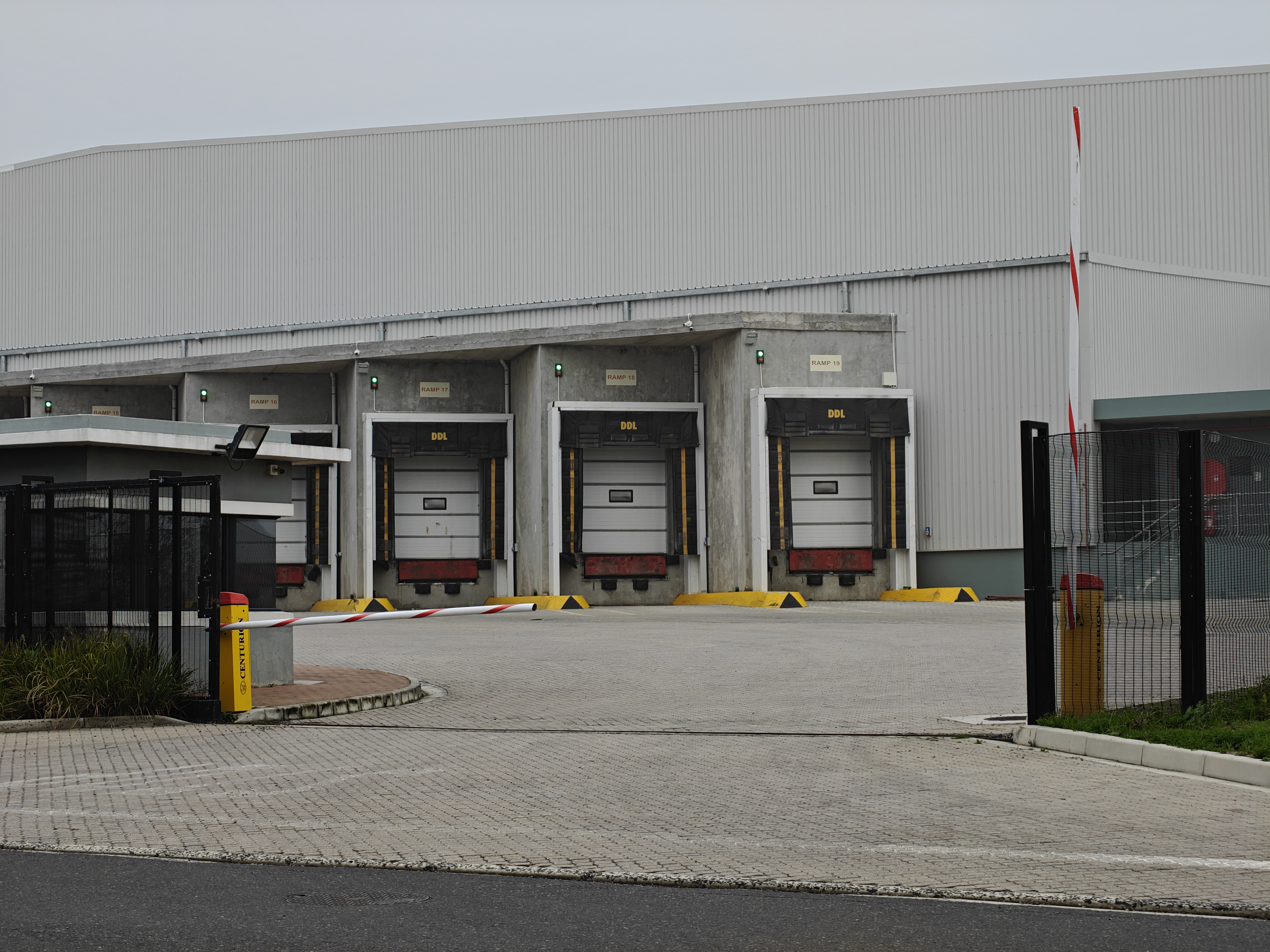
Semi-truck loading bays in Cape Town

=== Road freight ===
Transport by road is by far the most popular means of moving freight around South Africa. As of October 2025, over 85% of land freight in SA travels by road. For every ton of freight moved by rail, more than six tons is moved by road. Each year, almost 1 billion tons (984 million) of freight is transported along South Africa's road networks. This is an increase of over 50% over the period between 2010 and 2025.

National roads in South Africa are administered by SANRAL, a state-owned company that reports to the Department of Transport. SANRAL is responsible for financing, managing, planning, developing, and maintaining the national road network. Municipalities also have control over and put funding into certain roadways. Certain avenues of private funding for roadways in South Africa also exist.

=== Air freight ===
South Africa's air freight sector serves primarily international trade rather than domestic distribution. Most air freight consists of high-value, perishable, and/or time-sensitive goods that cannot economically be transported by sea or road. Air freight represents well under 1% of South Africa's freight by mass, but carries a disproportionately high share of high-value goods.

The country's air cargo network is dominated by O.R. Tambo International Airport in Johannesburg, which functions as Southern Africa's principal air cargo gateway. The airport has a total cargo capacity of 650,000 tons.

According to the Department of Transport's Draft Airfreight Strategy for South Africa, 2025, by weight, 95% of all air freight flows through O.R. Tambo, with a further 3% transiting via Cape Town International, and 1% via King Shaka International. The same draft identified O.R. Tambo International and Cape Town International as the country's principal air cargo gateways. Domestic air freight accounts for less than 5% of total air freight in SA.

South Africa's air freight market size was estimated at approximately R55.3 billion in 2024, with a projected CAGR of 8.75% through 2030. Also in 2024, South Africa accounted for a 19.5% share of the total air freight market in the Middle East and Africa region.

The majority state-owned Airports Company South Africa (ACSA) manages all of South Africa's largest airports by cargo volume. The three largest such airports are O.R. Tambo International in Joburg, Cape Town International in Cape Town, and King Shaka International in Durban. These airports focus on different cargo:

- O.R. Tambo is focused on most of SA's manufactured exports and imports
- Cape Town International deals primarily with agricultural exports, such as fruit, flowers, and seafood
- King Shaka International supports manufacturing and automotive exports

Out of all air freight flowing through South Africa's airports, O.R. Tambo handles

Major players in the South African air freight sector include South African Airways Cargo, Ethiopian Cargo, Qatar Airways Cargo, Emirates SkyCargo, Lufthansa Cargo, Turkish Cargo, and Cargolux. Freight forwarders such as DHL, FedEx, UPS, and DSV also play a large role in the sector.

=== Rail freight ===
South Africa has a longer rail network than all other Sub-Saharan African countries combined, at a total length of 23,000 km. Its network also features most of the double track rail in the region. State-owned Transnet Freight Rail is one of the largest players in the region.

Approximately 15% of SA's land freight moves by rail.

As of 2026, South Africa has three "Bulk Mineral Rail Corridors", which are dedicated heavy haul lines for export minerals. These routes, which total 2,241km, are:

- Sishen → Port of Saldanha (OREX), for transporting iron ore and manganese
- Ermelo → Richards Bay Coal Terminal, for transporting coal
- Northern Cape manganese fields → Gqeberha / Ngqura, for transporting manganese

The country's "Core Rail Network", with a combined length of 4,481km, plays a major role in connecting the country's geographically separated economic hubs (metro areas), industrial hubs, inland logistics centers, and seaports. As of 2026, the network is as follows:

- Cape Town ⟷ Kimberley ⟷ Johannesburg: General freight
- Durban ⟷ Richards Bay: Coastal freight
- Johannesburg ⟷ Durban: General freight (SA's busiest intermodal freight corridor)
- Johannesburg ⟷ Gqeberha / Ngqura: Automotive exports and manufactured goods
- Johannesburg ⟷ Polokwane: Mining supplies, and agricultural and manufacturing freight
- Johannesburg ⟷ Richards Bay: General freight
- Johannesburg ⟷ KuGompo City: Automotive and general freight
- Johannesburg ⟷ Komatipoort: Cross-border freight to Mozambique and the rest of the SADC
- Johannesburg ⟷ Beitbridge: Cross-border freight into Zimbabwe
- Johannesburg ⟷ Mahikeng / Ramatlabama: Cross-border freight into Botswana

As of 2026, Transnet Freight Rail moves 17% of South Africa's freight annually, including 100% of its export coal and iron ore. The company coordinates its rail freight services with other Transnet divisions, such as ports, pipelines, and engineering. With over 25,000 employees, Transnet Freight Rail generates over R14 billion in annual revenue.

For its 2025/2026 financial year, Transnet expected to transport a total rail cargo volume of around 168 million tons, up around 5%, from 160.1 million tons the year before.

Under the South African Government's rail restructuring plan, the goal is for Transnet to reach a transport capacity of 185 million tons, with a further 65 million tons transported by private operators, by 2030. This would make for a total South African cargo rail capacity of 250 million tons per year.

=== Sea freight ===
The Transnet National Ports Authority owns, and is for the most part responsible for operations of, South Africa's eight commercial seaports.

Around 60% of all South African imports and exports pass through the Port of Durban, which consists of 58 berths ranging from 148m to 350m, with depths of up to 12.2m. Other significant seaports in terms of cargo volumes include the Port of Cape Town, the Port of Gqeberha, and the Port of Ngqura.

Transnet National Ports Authority statistics for cargo processed each year in South Africa are below.

Year	Total cargo (metric tons)	Change	TEUs	Change	Vessel arrivals	Change
2024	211,228,740 (~211 million)	—	4,303,758	—	9,201	—
2025	219,543,682 (~219 million)	▲3.94%	4,472,945	▲3.93%	9,342	▲1.53%

=== Pipelines ===
South Africa's pipeline freight sector is the smallest of the country's freight modes by network size. However, pipelines are of strategic importance, as they continuously transport energy products between refineries, ports, storage depots, and major inland markets. These products include natural gas, crude oil, and refined petroleum products such as gasoline, diesel, paraffin, and jet fuel.

Fuel pipelines in SA are predominantly managed by Transnet Pipelines (TPL), a division of state-owned company Transnet.

Two other players in the sector are the Republic of Mozambique Pipeline Investments Company (ROMPCO), which owns and operates the 865km Mozambique to South Africa natural gas pipeline, and Sasol, which owns and operates portions of the downstream gas transmission network that distribute gas after it reaches Secunda via ROMPCO. At Secunda, Sasol operates the world's largest coal-to-liquids plant.

The pipelines exists in large part to supply inland fuel demand, especially in Gauteng, without relying solely on road tankers or rail tank wagons. Major metros such as Cape Town and Durban are able to acquire their fuel by sea. The network of pipelines also supplies natural gas to KwaZulu-Natal. They span the provinces of KwaZulu-Natal, Free State, Mpumalanga, Gauteng, and North West.

As of 2026, the network consists of:

- 3,114km of high-pressure petroleum and gas pipelines
- An inland accumulation facility at Jameson Park, Gauteng (TM2), with a capacity of 180Ml
- A tank farm in Tarlton, Gauteng, for storage and distribution via rail and road, with a capacity of 29Ml
- A coastal terminal at Island View in Durban, for continuously supplying jet fuel to O.R. Tambo International Airport

The Transnet pipeline network transports over 80% of refined fuel products for use in the inland market, and over 70% of the jet fuel used at O.R. Tambo International Airport.

Approximately three-quarters of South Africa's fuel imports flow through Island View Precinct, which forms part of the Port of Durban. The Precinct serves as the country's main fuel storage and supply hub.

Data for Transnet's pipeline fuel logistics is in the table below.

Year	Petroleum volume transported	Change	Reference
2023	17.80 billion liters	—	
2024	15.19 billion liters	▼14.66%	
2025	13.37 billion liters	▼11.98%	

== Sustainability ==
Sustainability has become a major policy objective in South Africa's logistics sector. Because road freight dominates the country's land freight system, most sustainability initiatives focus on reducing emissions from trucking, while increasing the use of rail.

2025 research on the Gauteng province's freight industry showed that many road freight companies are adopting green logistics practices, primarily through increased operational efficiency. Measures include route optimization, higher vehicle utilization and backhauling, lower-emission trucks, the use of alternative fuels, and the electrification of suitable fleets.

South Africa's warehouses and logistics facilities are increasingly incorporating rooftop solar photovoltaic systems, battery storage systems, electric material-handling equipment, and energy-efficient refrigeration. Energy efficient warehousing is one of the fastest-growing sustainability measures in the South African logistics sector.

Sustainable freight corridors continue to be developed in South Africa. A network of off-grid solar-powered charging infrastructure for heavy-duty electric trucks is being rolled out along major highways, by Cape Town-based company Charge. The EV charging network operator, founded in 2021, is installing 120 charging stations, designed specifically for electric trucks. The chargers are planned to be located along the N3 freight corridor between Johannesburg and Durban, with future expansion planned along the N1 corridor.

== Industry organizations ==
There are many trade associations and other industry organizations involved in the South African logistics sector. These include:

- Southern African Association of Freight Forwarders (SAAFF)
- Chartered Institute of Logistics and Transport (CILT)
- International Federation of Freight Forwarders Associations (IFFFA)
- The Fuels Industry Association of South Africa (FIASA)
- Road Freight Association (RFA)
- SAPICS
- South African Express Parcel Association (SAEPA)
- South African Association of Ship Operators and Agents (SAASOA)
- African Rail Industry Association (ARIA)
- Commercial Aviation Association of Southern Africa (CAASA)
- Fresh Produce Exporters' Forum (FPEF)

== Performance measures ==
The South African logistics sector ranks highly on a global scale, and rankings are continuing to increase. According to indices from the World Bank, as of 2026, SA's logistics infrastructure and performance are comparable to those of China and the United States. South Africa ranked joint 19th place, out of 139 countries in the 2023 World Bank Logistics Performance Index - an increase of 14 places year-over-year.

There are various measures of performance for South African logistics, with a mix of indices, ranks, and other metrics from the a national and node-specific perspective. According to the Council for Scientific and Industrial Research, some of these are:

Scope	Indicator / index	Unit of analysis	Reported as	Possible use	Potential for decision support
National perspective	Logistics Performance Index (LPI)	National logistics system	Index and rank	Benchmark against trade partners	Impacts trade partners' business choices
National perspective	Cost of logistics	National logistics system	Cost as percentage of GDP	Benchmarking	Identify trends Identify cost drivers
National perspective	Reserve Bank's Composite Supply Chain Pressure Index (CSCPI)	National supply chain	Changes in volumes, cost, delivery periods and inventories relative to demand, raw materials shortages	Detect trends in supply chain pressures	Reacted to expected inflationary pressures as a result of supply chain pressures
National and sector	Transport Freight Index (TFI)	Transport subsectors (rail, road, air, sea, pipelines, and warehousing)	Index based on activity (volumes or real terms) per sub-sector	Detect trends (sector growth or decline)	Outlook for the sector
Entity / node perspective	Container Port Performance Index (CPPI)	Individual ports	Rank	Benchmark against trade partners	Impacts trade partners' use of port facilities
Entity / node perspective	Operational indicators, e.g., Business Unity South Africa (BUSA) reports	Truck/container movement	Weekly and monthly operational performance parameters at key points (ports, borders and others)	Shows operational bottlenecks	Firm-level operational decisions

== Governance ==
The South African Government department most related to the country's logistics sector is the Department of Transport (DoT). In 2023, the DoT released a Roadmap for the Freight Logistics System in South Africa. In the document, the government outlined that while it believed that strategic infrastructure such as rail and ports would remain publicly-owned, as it belongs to the people of South Africa, operating of such infrastructure could be opened up to private investment.

Doing so, the government believes, will allow for increased efficiencies and competitiveness. The roadmap serves as a guide for state-owned transit company Transnet to achieve this balance, translating policy commitments into actions that are to be taken by the entity.

In 2025, one of the themes of the Department of Transport's budget was facilitating the development of the country's air cargo capacity. Part of a R21.7-billion Airports Company South Africa (ACSA) infrastructure development allocation was set aside for increasing air freight handling through its network of airports.

South Africa's fuel pipelines are regulated by the National Energy Regulator of South Africa (NERSA).

== See also ==
- Economy of South Africa
- Transport in South Africa
