= Transnet National Ports Authority =

South African state-owned seaport authority

- Formerly: National Ports Authority of South Africa
- Type: Division
- Industry: Transport; Logistics
- Predecessor: Portnet
- Founded: 2000; 26 years ago
- Headquarters: Gqeberha, Eastern Cape, South Africa
- Number of locations: 8 commercial seaports (2026)
- Area served: South Africa
- Key people: Mohammed Abdool (CEO)
- Services: Seaport management
- Revenue: ▲ R14.72 billion (2025)
- Number of employees: 3,818 (2025)
- Parent: Transnet
- Website: transnet.net/TNPA

Transnet National Ports Authority (TNPA) is a South African state-owned company and an operating division of local state-owned transport and logistics company Transnet.

Founded in 2000, and based in Gqeberha, Eastern Cape, TNPA is the landlord, infrastructure owner, and entity responsible for managing South Africa's eight commercial seaports.

== History ==
Transnet was established in 1990 as the state-owned holding company for the country's freight transport businesses, following the restructuring of the South African Transport Services system. Its seaports division, Portnet, combined port infrastructure management with port operations.

In 2000, Transnet separated Portnet into two businesses – the National Ports Authority of South Africa, responsible for the landlord functions of the ports; and South African Port Operations, responsible for port operations.

The separation preceded the establishment of the statutory framework for South Africa's ports. The National Ports Act 12 of 2005 provided for the establishment of a National Ports Authority and a Ports Regulator, and formalized the separation between the authority responsible for port infrastructure and the companies providing port services. The Act came into effect on 26 November 2006.

In 2007, the National Ports Authority was renamed Transnet National Ports Authority (TNPA), while South African Port Operations was renamed Transnet Port Terminals. The changes formed part of a broader restructuring of Transnet's operating divisions under a unified corporate brand.

During the following decade, TNPA operated as the landlord authority for South Africa's commercial ports, while the statutory framework introduced economic regulation through the Ports Regulator. The separation was intended to allow TNPA to control port infrastructure, navigation, and licensing while terminal operations were undertaken separately.

However, the authority remained an operating division of Transnet, despite the National Ports Act providing for an independent authority, a structure that was subsequently criticized for creating a conflict between Transnet's ownership of port infrastructure and its role in port operations.

By the late 2010s, declining port performance and concerns about infrastructure investment and governance had increased pressure for institutional reform. A 2020 academic assessment of South Africa's port system argued that TNPA should be incorporated as a standalone entity, stating that greater institutional separation could improve transparency, accountability, infrastructure investment, and competition.

In June 2021, the South African Government announced that TNPA would be corporatized as an independent, wholly owned subsidiary of Transnet, as part of a broader reform of the country's freight logistics system. The reform was intended to separate the infrastructure owner role of TNPA from the terminal operator role of Transnet Port Terminals, while allowing port revenues to be reinvested in infrastructure, and creating greater scope for private sector participation in terminal operations.

That same year, an interim board was appointed as part of the corporatization process, and the establishment of TNPA as an independent subsidiary was gazetted in July that year. The process, however, remained incomplete, with the authority continuing to operate as a division of Transnet while the necessary corporate and governmental approvals were being pursued.

In October 2023, the inaugural TNPA board of directors was appointed as part of the continuing corporatization process. In 2024, Transnet said that it had begun the formal corporatization process, including the preparation of the memorandum of incorporation and registration of the National Ports Authority as a wholly owned subsidiary.

In September 2026, the Cabinet of South Africa granted approval for TNPA to entirely separate from parent company Transnet, and become a standalone company. It would thus be responsible for making its own seaport infrastructure investment decisions.

== Operations ==
For all eight of South Africa's commercial seaports, TNPA is the authority responsible for the master planning; controlling of port navigations; controlling of port services and facilities; and marketing.

=== Related entities ===
A separate Transnet division, Transnet Port Terminals, is responsible for port terminal operations and cargo handling.

Fellow national government agency the Ports Regulator is responsible for the regulation of economic activity at South Africa's ports.

== See also ==
- Ports and harbours in South Africa
- Logistics in South Africa
- Transport in South Africa
