= Port of Gqeberha =

Seaport in the Eastern Cape, South Africa

Port of Gqeberha Port of Port Elizabeth
- Interactive map of Port of Gqeberha; Port of Port Elizabeth
- Location within South Africa

Location
- Country: South Africa
- Location: Gqeberha, Eastern Cape
- Coordinates: 33°57′S 25°38′E
- UN/LOCODE: ZAPLZ

Details
- Opened: 1825; 201 years ago
- Operated by: Transnet National Ports Authority
- Owned by: Transnet National Ports Authority
- No. of berths: 18
- Draft depth: Draft 12.1 m (40 ft)

Statistics
- 2025 World Bank Container Port Performance Index: 314 (out of 400)
- Website; Transet Port Elizabeth

The Port of Gqeberha is a port in the city of Gqeberha (previously Port Elizabeth), in the Eastern Cape, South Africa. Located in Algoa Bay, it handles dry bulk, bulk liquid, breakbulk and containers, as well as providing facilities for tugs and fishing vessels.

== Performance ranking ==
In the 2023 World Bank Container Port Performance Index, the port was ranked 391st out of 405., and in the 2024 ranking finished 395th out of 403. In the 2025 rankings, the port improved significantly, finishing 314th out of 400. That same year, the Port of Gqeberha was named the world's most improved port since 2020.

== See also ==
- Transport in South Africa
- Logistics in South Africa
