= Port of Durban =

Major shipping terminal in Durban, South Africa

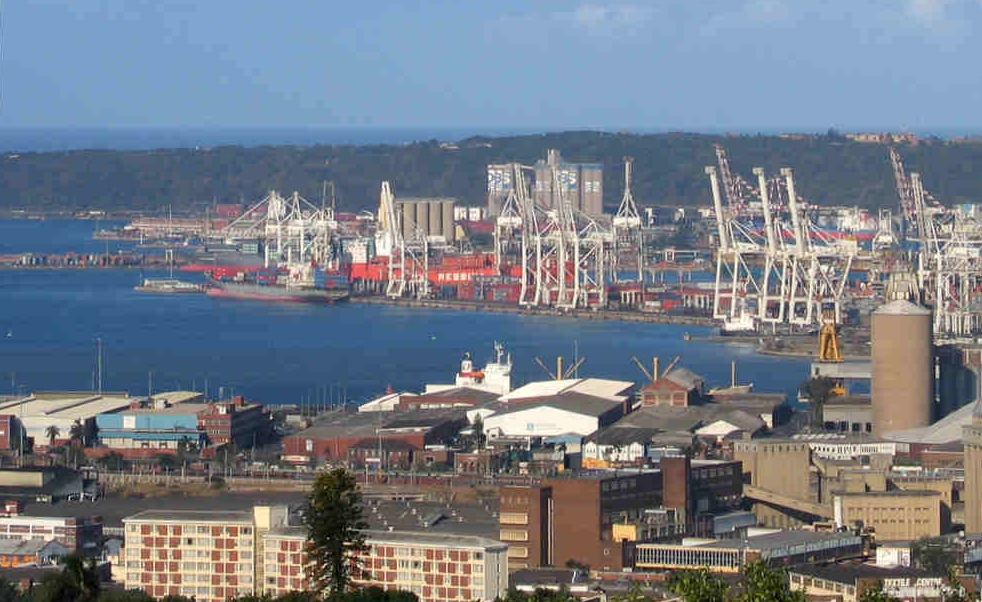
- Interactive map of Port of Durban
- Location within South Africa

Location
- Country: South Africa
- Location: Durban, KwaZulu-Natal
- Coordinates: 29.8732°S 31.0245°E
- UN/LOCODE: ZADUR

Details
- Opened: c. 1840; 186 years ago
- Operated by: Transnet National Ports Authority
- Owned by: Transnet National Ports Authority

Statistics
- 2025 World Bank Container Port Performance Index: 398 (out of 400)
- Website transnet.net

The Port of Durban, commonly called Durban Harbour, is the largest and busiest shipping terminal in sub-Saharan Africa. It handles up to 31.4 million tons of cargo each year. It is the fourth largest container terminal in the Southern Hemisphere, handling approximately 4.5 million TEU in 2019.

== Port statistics ==
- Durban is the busiest port in South Africa and generates more than 60% of revenue.
- It is the second largest container port in Africa (after Port Said in Egypt).
- It is the fourth largest container port in Southern Hemisphere. (First is Jakarta in Indonesia, second is Surabaya in Indonesia, third is Santos in Brazil).
- The distance around the port is 21 kilometres (13 miles).
- Rail tracks total 302 kilometres (188 miles).
- The port has 58 berths which are operated by more than 20 terminal operators.
- Over 4,500 commercial vessels call at the port each year.

The port has recently been widened. The harbor entrance depth is now 19 metres (62 ft) in the approach channel decreasing to 16 metres within the harbour. The navigation width is now 220 metres (720 ft).

The port saw a drop of "5 per cent of the liner shipping services, 6.2 per cent of ship calls and 2.8 per cent of the deployed capacity" during the second quarter of 2020 due to the adverse impact of the global COVID-19 pandemic. However, the maximum capacity of container ships calling at the port increased by 14.5 percent during the same time period.

The 2022 World Bank Container Port Performance Index ranked Durban 341st out of the 348 ports surveyed. In the 2023 report, the port slipped to 399th out of the 405 ports surveyed.

In the 2024 rankings, the port fell to the bottom position, 403rd of 403.

In the Container Port Performance Index 2025, the port was noted for its improvement in vessel turnaround times, although it only slightly improved its ranking to 398th out of 400.

== Port facilities ==
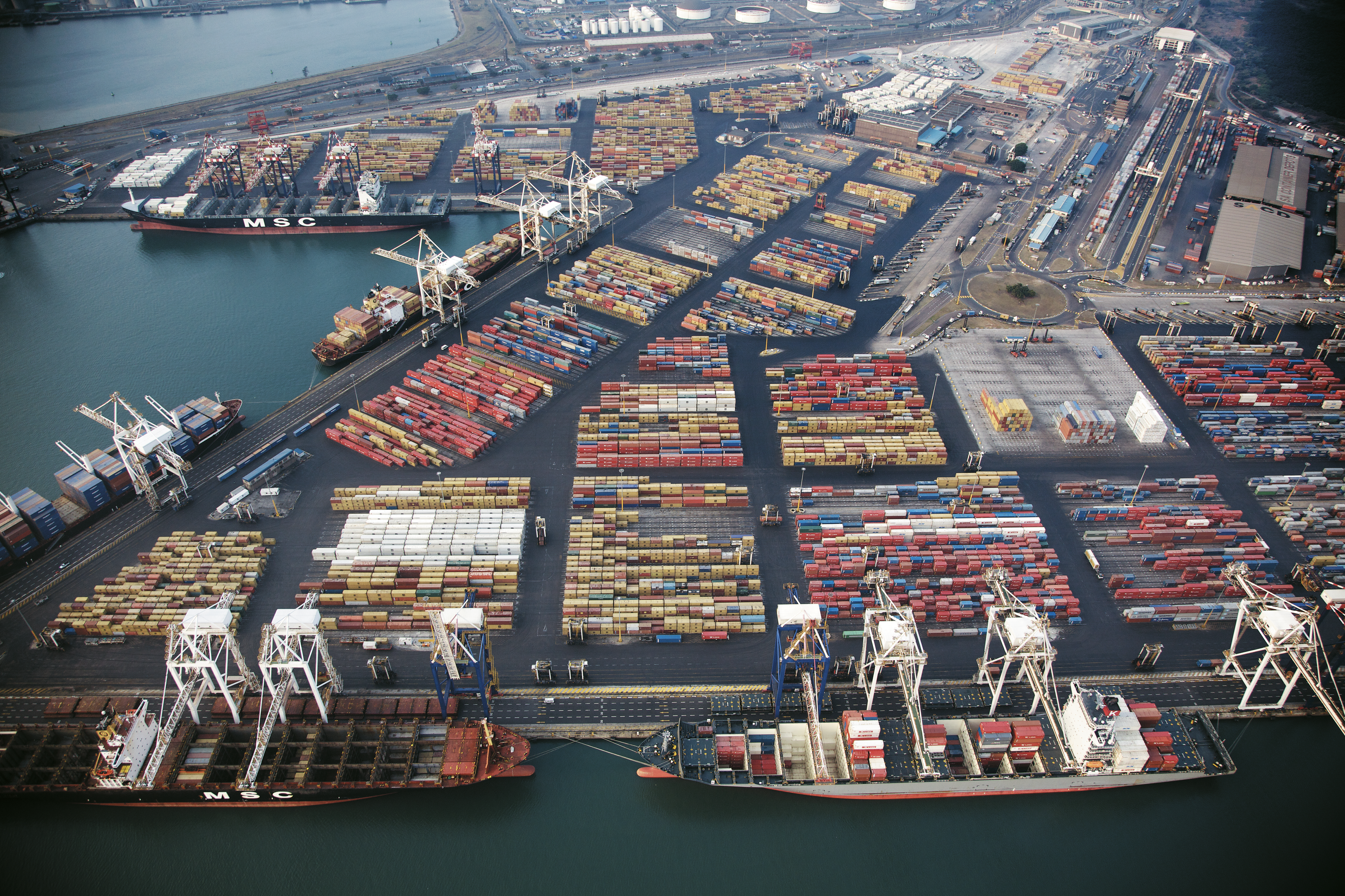
Aerial view of the container port

=== Berths ===
- Pier No. 1 Berth
- Pier No. 2 Berth
- Point and T-Jetty Berth
- Cross Berth
- Island View
- Bluff Berth
- Bayhead Berth
- Maydon Wharf Berth

=== Car terminal ===
Durban Car Terminal opened in 1998, with a capacity of 60,000 vehicles a year. In 2004 a 100-million-Rand expansion brought the number of bays to 6,500. This included a 380m bridge linking the terminal to the quayside, improving vessel turnaround time and improving security.

=== Cruise terminal ===
MSC Cruises has rotated its Durban-homeported vessel several times since the 2019/2020 season. For the 2024/2025 South African cruise season, MSC Musica returned to Durban as the homeported vessel, arriving on 25 November 2024.

For the 2025/2026 season, MSC Cruises announced that MSC Opera would replace MSC Musica, scheduled to commence its local season on 28 November 2025 with round-trip departures from Durban and Cape Town. Many other cruise ships pass through Durban every year, including some of the world's biggest, such as the RMS Queen Mary 2.

The tender to build the R215 million Durban Cruise Terminal was awarded to KwaZulu Cruise Terminal (Pty) Ltd which is 70% owned by MSC Cruises SA and 30% by Africa Armada Consortium. The terminal will be able to accommodate two cruise ships at any given time.

== Naval facilities ==
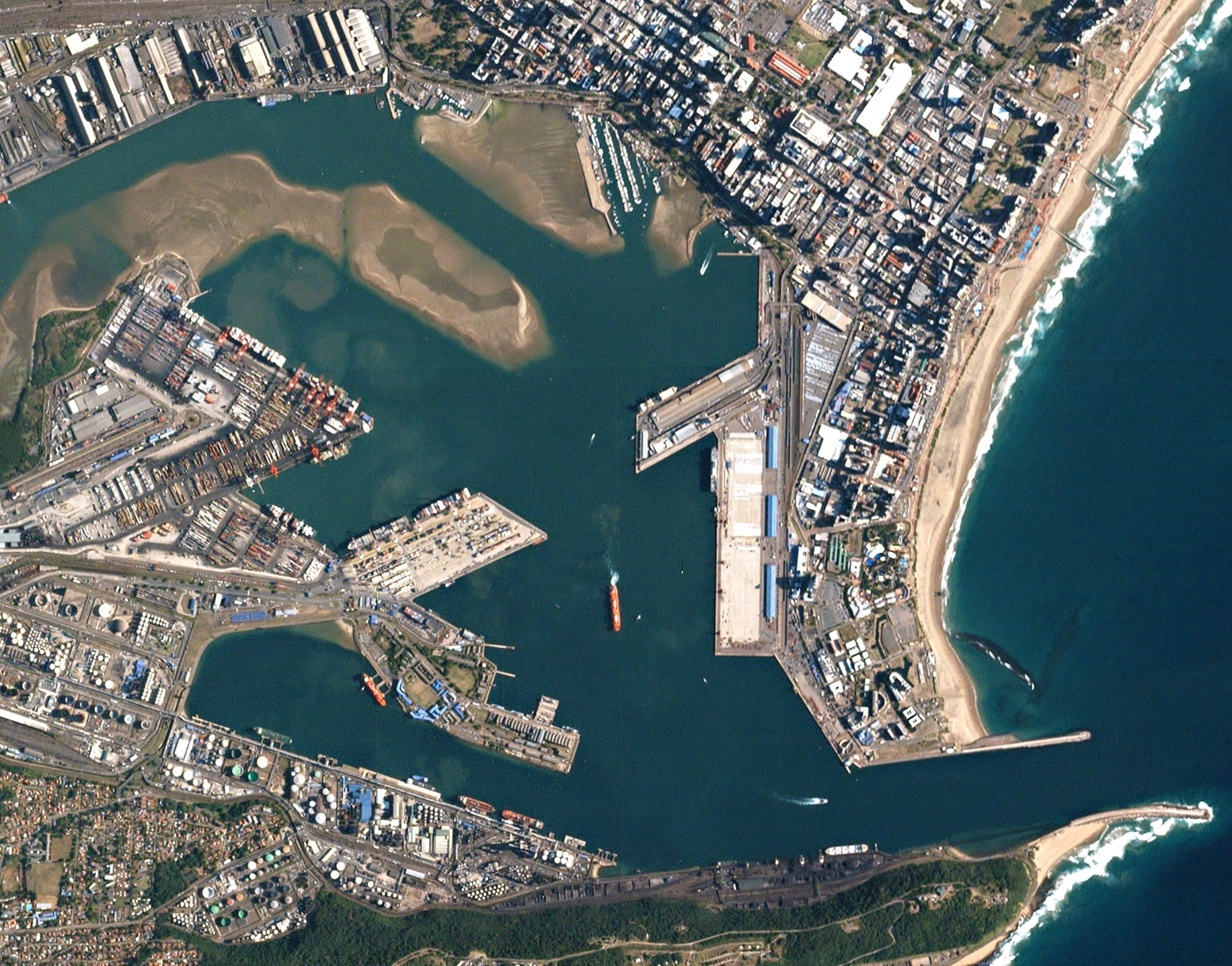
Satellite image of the seaward part of the port

Naval Base Durban, situated on Salisbury Island, is part of the Port of Durban. Established during the Second World War, it was downgraded to a naval station in 2002. In 2012 a decision was made to renovate and expand the facilities back up to a full naval base to accommodate the South African Navy's offshore patrol flotilla.

In December 2015, it was redesignated a naval base. It is the home port of three Warrior-class interim offshore patrol vessels (formerly missile-armed fast attack craft) which will be replaced by a new patrol flotilla within four to five years.

== Expansion plans ==
In April 2021, South African officials revealed a $7 billion modernization and expansion plan of the port facilities in order to increase efficiency and improve its standing as one of Africa's best and biggest ports. The program is expected to expand port capacity from 2.9 million TEU to more than 11 million TEU by 2031.

The plan has been criticized by labour unions over not being consulted on the construction contracts, and warned that the government's intention to partner with the private sector to complete the expansion could lead to job losses for a highly indebted state-owned company. In December 2025, Transnet and International Container Terminal Services, Inc. (ICTSI) formally signed a 25-year partnership agreement for Durban Container Terminal Pier 2, constituting South Africa's first port privatisation deal. Under the agreement, Pier 2 is held through a new special-purpose vehicle in which Transnet Port Terminals holds a 51 percent majority stake and ICTSI holds 49 percent.

The deal followed a legal challenge by APM Terminals, a subsidiary of Maersk, which the KwaZulu-Natal High Court dismissed in October 2025. The partnership, which took effect on 1 January 2026, calls for approximately $650 million of investment, with the objective of expanding Pier 2's annual capacity from 2 million TEU to 2.8 million TEU and improving crane productivity from 18 to 28 gross crane moves per hour.

In parallel with the broader expansion plan, Transnet has pursued near-term infrastructure improvements. In December 2023, Transnet National Ports Authority issued a Request for Proposals for the reconstruction, deepening, and lengthening of berths at Durban Container Terminal Pier 2 North Quay, with construction targeted to commence in 2024.

The project, part of a R154 billion KwaZulu-Natal Ports Master Plan, involves deepening Berths 203, 204, and 205 and the approach channel from 12.8 metres to 16.5 metres, and extending effective berth length from 914 metres to 1,210 metres to accommodate three Super Post Panamax vessels simultaneously.

Separately, in March 2025, Transnet unveiled a R3.4 billion investment programme to upgrade cargo-handling machinery at the port, including the delivery of new straddle carriers and rubber-tyred gantry (RTG) cranes at Durban Container Terminal.

== See also ==
- List of ports of entry in South Africa
- Transport in South Africa
- Logistics in South Africa
