= Driving licence in South Africa =

Document allowing one to drive a motor vehicle

South African Driver's License
- The front of an example South African driver's license, released by the Department of Transport. Information shown is intentionally incorrect and obfuscated

- The rear of an example South African driver's license, released by the Department of Transport. Information shown is intentionally incorrect and obfuscated
- Type: Driver's license card
- Issued by: South Africa
- First issued: 1998; 28 years ago (current format)
- In circulation: Yes
- Purpose: Identifying those who are legally permitted to operate a motor vehicle on public roads in South Africa
- Valid in: South Africa
- Eligibility: Citizens and permanent residents of South Africa
- Expiration: 5 years from the date of issue, for light motor vehicles (10 years after pending legislative amendments)
- Cost: Varies by municipality ~ R150 to R200
- Rights: Legal operation of a permitted category of motor vehicle on South African public roads
- Size: ISO/IEC 7810 ID-1 (credit card) format
- Website: gov.za/services/driving-licence

In South Africa, a driver's licence is the official document which authorises the holder to drive a motor vehicle on a public road. Driver's licences are issued by authorised licence testing centres, which are run by South Africa's municipalities (local governments), under the supervision of the country's provincial and national Departments of Transport.

South African driver's licenses use a system of codes, categorizing licenses according to the type of vehicle a license holder is legally permitted to drive. Examples are Category B for passenger vehicles weighing below 3.5 tons, and Category C for buses and goods vehicles weighing over 16 tons. It is permissible to hold multiple different categories of vehicle licenses simultaneously, such as in the case where someone owns a truck license for work and a passenger vehicle license for personal use.

Professional Driving Permits (PrDPs) are required in addition to standard driving licenses, in order to operate specific categories of vehicles, such as heavy duty or public transit vehicles. PrDPs need to be applied for separately. Distinct PrDP categories exist for goods vehicles, dangerous goods vehicles, and passenger vehicles (such as buses).

Since 1998, the driving licence has been issued in an ISO/IEC 7810 ID-1 (credit card) format (though slightly thinner than a standard payment card). Prior to this, it was included as part of the holder's national identity document. The minimum age to hold a driver's licence is 18, with the exception of a Code A1 category license, for which the minimum age is 16. A learner's license - which limits what a driver can do, and does not allow them to drive without the presence of a full license holder - can be acquired from age 16.

South African driver's licenses for light vehicles are valid for five years from their date of issue, and must be renewed to retain validity. As of 2026, the validity period is set to extend to 10 years from the date of issue, pending relevant legislative amendments. Drivers are not allowed to operate a motor vehicle on public roads without a valid driver's license matching the type of vehicle they are driving.

Licenses are valid only within the country's borders, and only specifically on South Africa's public road network. The South African driver's license may be valid for a specific period of time in foreign jurisdictions, depending on those respective local laws, and may be subject to obtaining an international driving permit (IDP) from a body such as an Automobile Association (AA) or travel agency.

In December 2024, the RTMC reported that there were a total of approximately 16 million (15,991,376) issued driver's licenses (of all types) in South Africa - an increase of 4% year-over-year. This constituted around 26% of the country's total population, and around 40% of the adult population, at the time.

== License features ==
South African driver's licenses feature various pieces of identifying information on the front and rear, as well as numerous security measures built into the cards' design.

The front of the card includes:

- South African ID number
- Date of birth
- Date of issue of current license
- Date of issue of first license
- Validity period of current license
- Driver's license number
- Vehicle code permitted
- License holder photograph (taken according to specific requirements)
- License holder signature
- Symbol denoting country of license issue as SA

The rear of the card includes:

- License barcode
- License holder fingerprint (taken at a designated license testing center)
- A table showing the various South African vehicle license codes

== Licence codes ==
Driving licences are issued with various codes that indicate the types of vehicle that may be driven with that licence. The codes and what they respectively permit are shown in the following table.

Code	Vehicle classes	Includes
Motorcycles
A1	Motorcycles with an engine capacity of 125 cubic centimetres or less	
A	Motorcycles with an engine capacity greater than 125 cc	Code A1
Light motor vehicles
B	Vehicles (except motorcycles) with tare weight of 3,500 kilograms or less; and minibuses, buses and goods vehicles with gross vehicle mass (GVM) of 3,500 kg or less. A trailer with GVM of 750 kg or less may be attached.	
EB	Articulated vehicles with gross combination mass (GCM) of 3,500 kg or less; and vehicles allowed by Code B but with a trailer with GVM greater than 750 kg.	Code B
Heavy motor vehicles
C1	In South Africa, driving licences are issued with various codes that indicate the types of vehicle that may be driven with that licence. To transport fare-paying passengers or tourists for a fee, you must have a professional driving permit (PrDP). For example, a Code EC1 licence includes codes B, EB and C1.	Code B
C	Buses and goods vehicles with GVM greater than 16,000 kg. A trailer with GVM of 750 kg or less may be attached.	Codes B and C1
EC1	Articulated vehicles with GCM between 3,500 kg and 16,000 kg; and vehicles allowed by Code C1 but with a trailer with GVM greater than 750 kg.	Codes B, EB and C1
EC	Articulated vehicles with GCM greater than 18,000 kg; and vehicles allowed by Code C but with a trailer with GVM greater than 750 kg.	Codes B, EB, C1, C and EC1

== Validity and renewal ==
South African driver's licenses are valid for a specific number of years from their date of issue (which is featured on the card), and must be renewed to retain validity. Drivers are not allowed to operate a motor vehicle on public roads without a valid driver's license matching the type of vehicle they are driving. Validity periods by license type are below.

- Light motor vehicles: 5 years from date of issue, and changing to 10 years after new legislation is enacted
- Commercial and public transit vehicles: 5 years from date of issue
- Professional Driver's Permits (PDP): 2 years from date of issue

The license needs to be in their vehicle or on their person whenever the vehicle is in operation on public roads. If the driver is stopped by traffic services and is not in possession of a valid license, or the license they have has already expired and they do not have a valid temporary (interim) license with them, they are subject to being fined and/or receiving license demerit points. Driver's licenses can be renewed indefinitely.

== Professional Driving Permits ==
Professional Driving Permits (PrDPs) are required in addition to standard driving licenses, in order to operate specific categories of vehicles. These include heavy duty and public transit vehicles. PrDPs need to be applied for separately. Distinct PrDP categories exist for goods vehicles, dangerous goods vehicles, and passenger vehicles (such as buses).

PrDPs have far more stringent requirements than standard driver's licenses, such as certification by an approved training body (for dangerous goods vehicles), medical assessments, criminal record checks, and checks to ensure the holder has never had a suspended license. The PrDP holder is not permitted to allow anyone to drive their vehicle, other than another person who holds the same type of PrDP.

== Application process ==
=== Online booking via eNaTIS ===
Residents in all provinces except the Western Cape can use the national government's eNaTIS system (linked to the National Traffic Information System/NaTIS backend) to book and manage licensing appointments online. The system is managed by the Road Traffic Management Corporation (RTMC).

Some metros operate their own online booking systems for vehicle licensing, such as the City of Cape Town with its City Connect system.

Applicants can also go to a designated driving license testing center to apply in person, though these are often quite busy, and applicants are advised to rather make appointments in advance whenever possible.

As part of the application process, a reference number is provided for follow-ups.

=== Learner's license process ===
A learner's licence is required to take driving lessons on a public road and to obtain a driver's licence. The South African learner's license is valid for 24 months and cannot be extended. Testing for the learner's license occurs at a registered driving license testing centre (DLTC). If a learner's license expires, the required testing to obtain one must be redone.

The learner's licence test covers:

- Rules of the road
- Road traffic signs, signals, and road markings
- Vehicle controls

The learner's test is a multiple-choice test that examines knowledge of vehicle controls, rules of the road, and traffic signs.

The following criteria required:

- Rules of the road – There are 28 questions in this category with 22 being the pass mark
- Vehicle controls – There are 8 questions in this section, the required pass mark is 6
- Road signs, road markings and traffic signals – There are 28 questions in this category with a pass mark of 23

Three types of learner's licence are issued:

- Code 1: motorcycles.
- Code 2: vehicles (except motorcycles) with tare weight of 3,500 kilograms or less; minibuses, buses and goods vehicles with GVM of 3,500 kg or less; and articulated vehicles with GCM of 3,500 kg or less.
- Code 3: all vehicles (except motorcycles).

The minimum age for a Code 1 or 2 licence is 17, and for a Code 3 licence it is 18. At the age of 16 a Code 1 licence limited to motorcycles with engine capacity under 125 cc may be obtained. Learner's licences are valid for 24 months, and, except for Code 1 licences, require that the learner be accompanied by a fully licensed driver.

It is not compulsory for a learner driver to have a red "L" sticker on the vehicle's rear window, but it is recommended so that other drivers are likely to be more patient with the learner driver. Driving school companies often make use of these signs, and other decals, to inform other road users that there may be a learner behind the wheel.

=== Driver's license process ===
With the learner's licence obtained, the prospective driver can take a driving test to obtain their driving licence. The driving test has two components: the first is the yard test, in which the applicant demonstrates various parking and turning manoeuvres in a specially constructed parking lot. If the yard test is successful, it is followed by the road test, in which the applicant demonstrates their driving ability on the public roads, following the instructions of the examiner.

Some errors on the test, such as a collision, speeding, or rolling in an unintended direction (this can be forwards or backwards) when moving off, will cause an instant failure of the test. Other errors cause the driver to lose points; if too many points are lost, this will also cause failure. If the applicant is successful, they will be issued with a paper Temporary Driving Licence, which is valid for 6 months from the date of issue.

A permanent licence card will be available for collection at the testing center the applicant went to for the driving test within 4–6 weeks, at which point they will be notified to collect it. If this card is lost, drivers can apply for a replacement, and will not need to redo testing to obtain the new card.

== Modernization and other developments ==
=== New license design ===
In November 2023, the Department of Transport launched a pilot program to test its new driver's license design. The new license features numerous improvements over the old design, including fitting more information onto a card of the same size.

The new design has a more sensible layout for the information it shows, and features new elements such as the South African flag, South African coat of arms, the license holder's gender, and two barcodes on the rear instead of just one. The new cards also feature a section explicitly stating that the license was issued by South Africa, rather than just having the country's name in the top right corner as is the case with the old card.

Finally, a significant upgrade is the inclusion of multiple license codes on a single card. This way, if a driver has additional permissible vehicle licenses, they can be featured on a single card, along with their respective dates of first issue. Furthermore, the new card features a section for Professional Driving Permits (PrDPs), with the holder's code and the expiry date, should the license holder have a PrDP to drive, for example, heavy-duty or public transit vehicles.

=== Cape Town and the Western Cape ===
In May 2025, the Western Cape provincial government launched South Africa's first digital learner’s license testing system. The province’s Mobility Department launched the new system in the town of Beaufort West, as part of trialing it.

The new method will replace the traditional pen and paper test, and is aimed at lowering corruption during the process. Furthermore, the new system will also deliver faster and more accurate results.

The digital testing system works by means of the applicant entering their South African ID number on a screen, and answering randomly-selected questions pulled from a database of around 1,200 questions in total. Results of the test are provided immediately once it has been completed.

In September 2025, the City of Cape Town launched South Africa's first drive through driver's license renewal facility. Located in Brackenfell, the new service aims to allow motorists to complete their license renewals in under 5 minutes, without leaving their cars.

The facility operates Monday through Saturday, and is cashless. Renewal can be expedited further if drivers who receive a renewal notification via SMS show the message at the drive through. The launch follows the introduction of the City of Cape Town's Online Booking System, which gives residents the flexibility to secure appointments for various municipal services, including vehicle licensing.

In February 2026, it was reported that the City of Cape Town's digital learner’s license testing system was nearing full launch, and would roll out across all of the metro's 18 Driving License Testing Centers from the week of 16 February 2026. The move reflects a broader shift towards technology-driven public services in the Western Cape.

=== Recent developments ===
In January 2026, the South African Department of Transport announced that it was embarking on a cabinet approval process for a new prototype design for SA driver's licenses. The goal is a license that can be printed by the Government Printing Works, circumventing the requirement to use the country's sole existing printing machine, which has caused numerous backlogs. The Government Printing Works already prints South Africa's smart ID cards and passports.

Alongside the new design, the Department of Transport also announced it had completed successful testing of a network connection between the Road Traffic Management Corporation (RTMC) and the Government Printing Works, allowing for the transfer of data and files required by the printers to produce the license cards.

In July 2026, the South African Government approved a change which will extend the validity of period of driving licenses from five years to 10 years. The change will affect only light motor vehicle licenses - Codes A, A1, B, and EB. Minister in the Presidency Khumbudzo Ntshavheni said the implementation process would follow relevant legislative amendments. The effective date of the new validity period has yet to be announced.

In August 2026, the new 10 year driving license extension was officially gazetted for public comment by the Department of Transport.
