= Transport in South Africa =

South Africa has a diverse and extensive transport system that includes road, rail, air, and maritime infrastructure. The country has the most developed road network in Africa, and the 10th-largest in the world, at approximately 750,000 kilometers.

While many residents rely on informal minibus taxis for daily commuting, formal public transport systems, such as private bus systems, Bus Rapid Transit (BRT) routes, e-hailing license systems, and both underground and overland rail, have been implemented in major cities, to provide safer and better-regulated transit services.

Major airports in South Africa include Cape Town International in Cape Town, King Shaka International in Durban, and OR Tambo International in Johannesburg.

South Africa also features several major ports, including the advanced Port of Cape Town, Port of Durban (SA's busiest port), and the Port of Gqeberha.

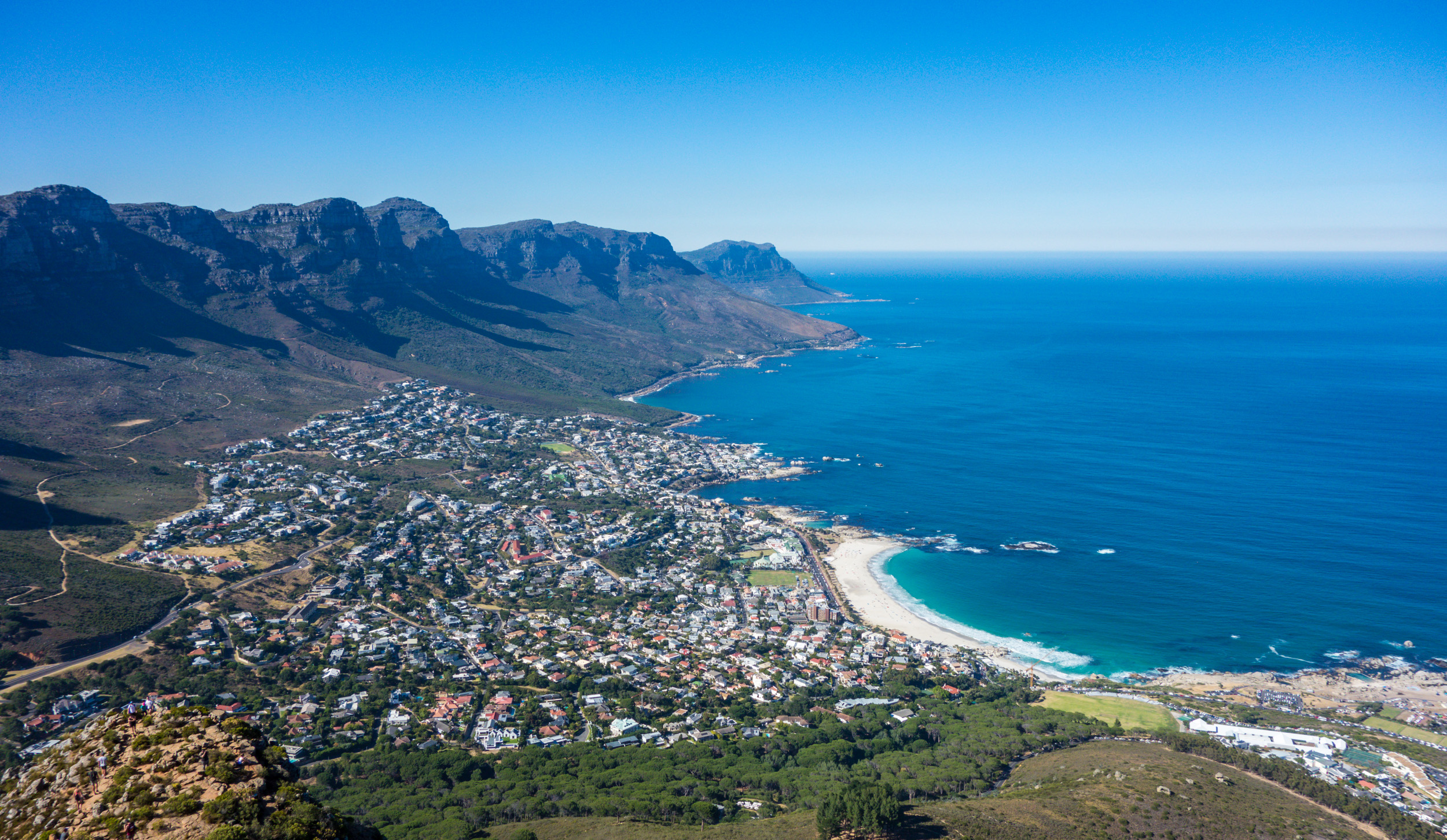
Road network in the predominantly suburban Atlantic Seaboard region of Cape Town

Cape Town is regarded to have a well run and well maintained transport infrastructure. The city dedicates a significant portion of its annual budget to transport infrastructure investment, and continues to develop transit systems. Cape Town's Metrorail commuter rail system features new modern trains, manufactured by Gibela. The city also has dedicated bike lanes, and a far-reaching, tap-to-pay BRT system (MyCiTi), which it employs dedicated bus lanes on freeways and major roads.

== Department of Transport ==
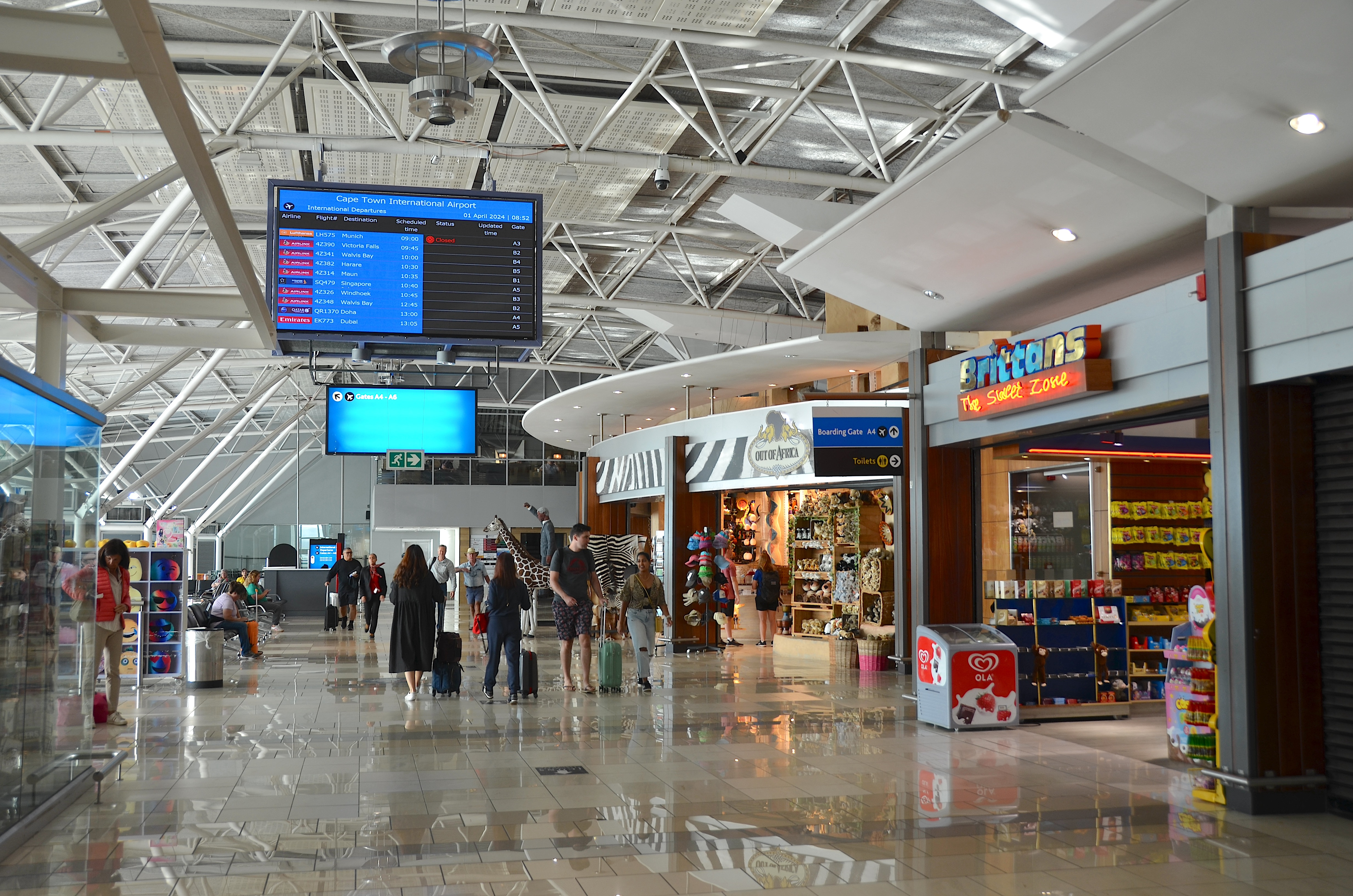
Part of the International Departures area at Cape Town International Airport

The Department of Transport is responsible for the regulation of all transportation in South Africa, including public transport, rail transportation, civil aviation, shipping, freight, and motor vehicles. According to the department's vision statement, "Transport [is] the heartbeat of South Africa's economic growth and social development"

The department manages several government agencies, which have specific mandates, such as the Road Traffic Management Corporation, Passenger Rail Agency of South Africa, SANRAL, the Railway Safety Regulator, and Airports Company South Africa.

== Roads ==
=== Road network and freeways ===
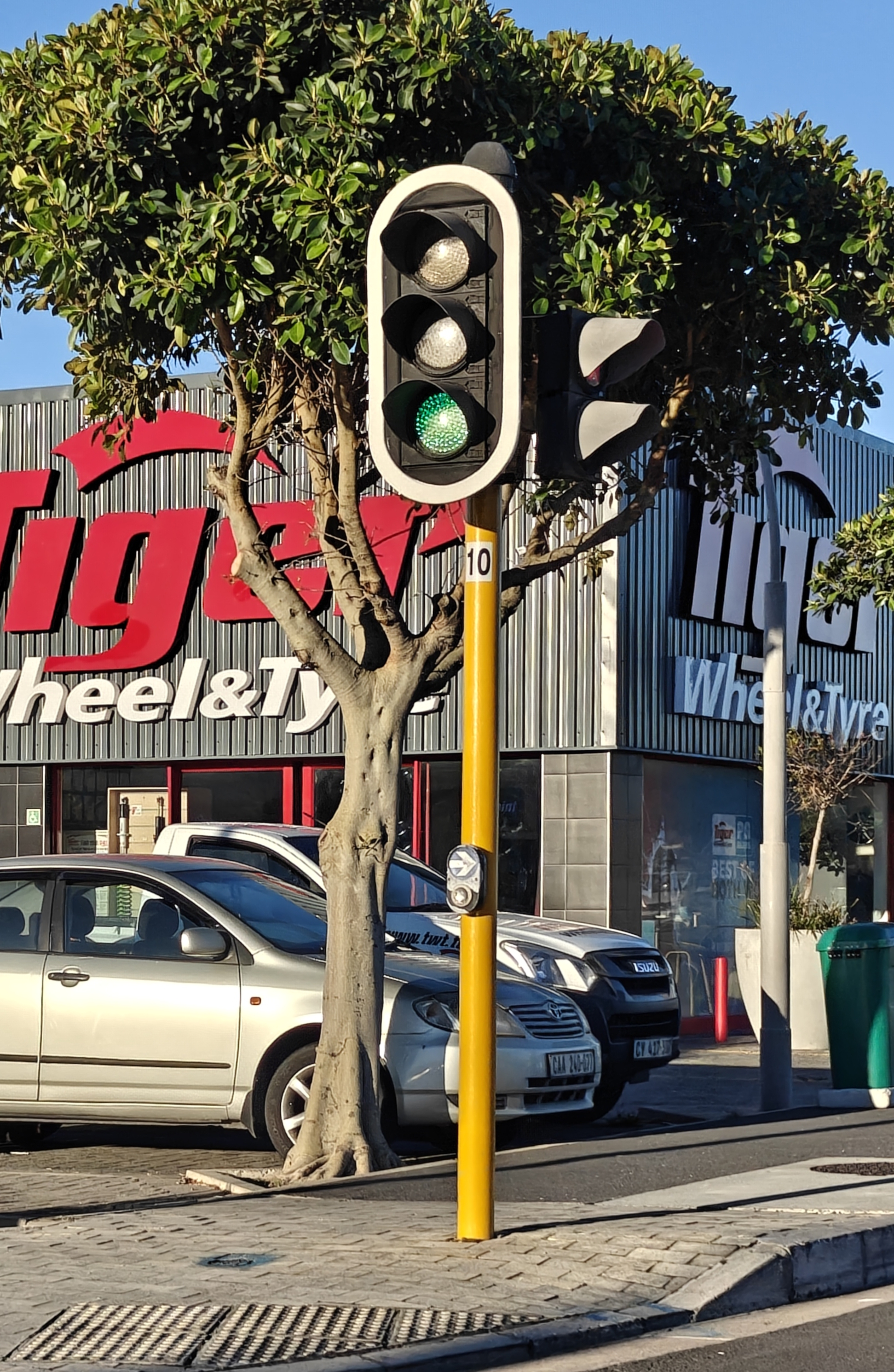
Pedestrian crossing and traffic signal in Dreyersdal, Cape Town

South Africa is home to the world's 10th-largest road network, at around 750,000 kilometers. It is also the most advanced in Africa.

The country's road infrastructure expanded significantly during the apartheid era, particularly to facilitate the transport of Black workers who had been forcibly relocated to Bantustans. This expansion included substantial government subsidies, sometimes exceeding $1,000 per commuter. In some regions, such as KwaNdebele, the state's bus subsidy exceeded the area's gross domestic product.

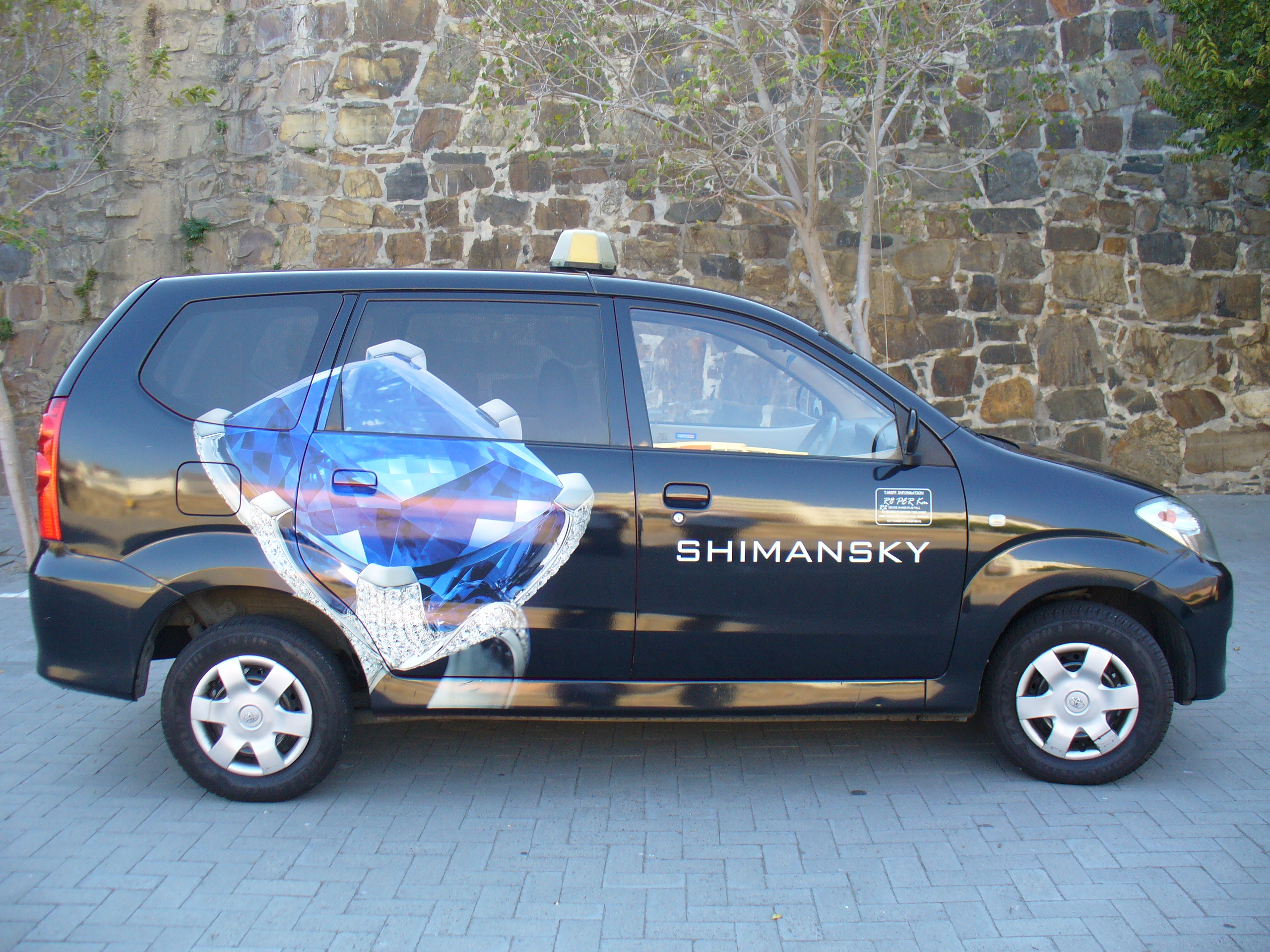
Private, metered taxi in Cape Town

In 2002, South Africa had 362,099 km of highways and 73,506 km of paved roads (including 239 km of expressways).

The term freeway in South Africa differs from most other parts of the world. A freeway is a road where certain restrictions apply. The following are forbidden from using a freeway:

- a vehicle drawn by an animal;
- a pedal cycle (such as a bicycle);
- a motor cycle having an engine with a cylinder capacity not exceeding 50 cm^{3} or that is propelled by electrical power;
- a motor tricycle or motor quadrucycle;
- pedestrians

Drivers on freeways must observe a minimum speed of 60 km/h and may not use hand signals except in emergencies. On multi-lane carriageways, slower drivers are required to keep left to allow faster vehicles to overtake.

Despite the popular opinion that "freeway" means a road with at least two carriageways, single-carriageway freeways exist. The Afrikaans translation of freeway is snelweg (literally fast road or expressway).

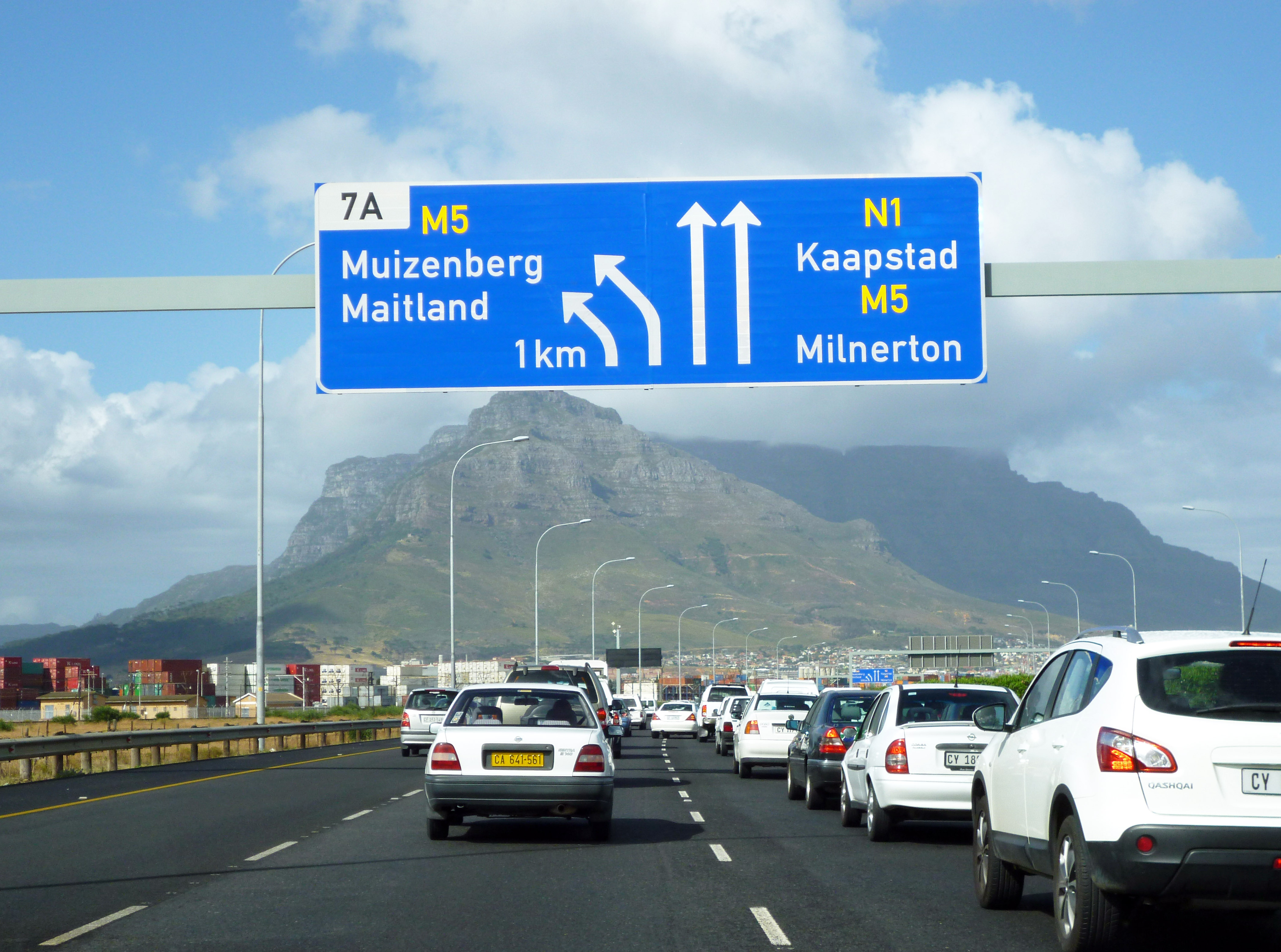
The N1 freeway heading westbound into Cape Town, with Table Mountain in the background

=== E-hailing ===
South Africa has licensed numerous private operators to run e-hailing services, whereby taxis are sourced through mobile apps, on demand. Operators include Uber and Bolt. Availability is good in major cities.

Since 2025, e-hailing drivers are required to register for e-hailing operating licenses. Under these permits, drivers are restricted to operating in specific jurisdictions. The new legislation is aimed at improving e-hailing safety and service quality.

=== Bus services ===
Conventional scheduled bus services form a significant part of South Africa's public transport system. Commuter bus services are provided by both subsidized and unsubsidized private operators, with provincial governments responsible for many contracted services. The national Department of Transport provides funding for provincially-contracted bus services through the Public Transport Operations Grant (PTOG), a conditional grant intended to supplement funding for public transport services provided by provincial departments of transport.

Golden Arrow bus in Cape Town

Major conventional bus operators include Golden Arrow Bus Services in Cape Town, PUTCO in Sandton, and Autopax in Pretoria. Numerous other provincial and municipal services operate in cities and towns across the country, including services provided through municipal integrated public transport networks.

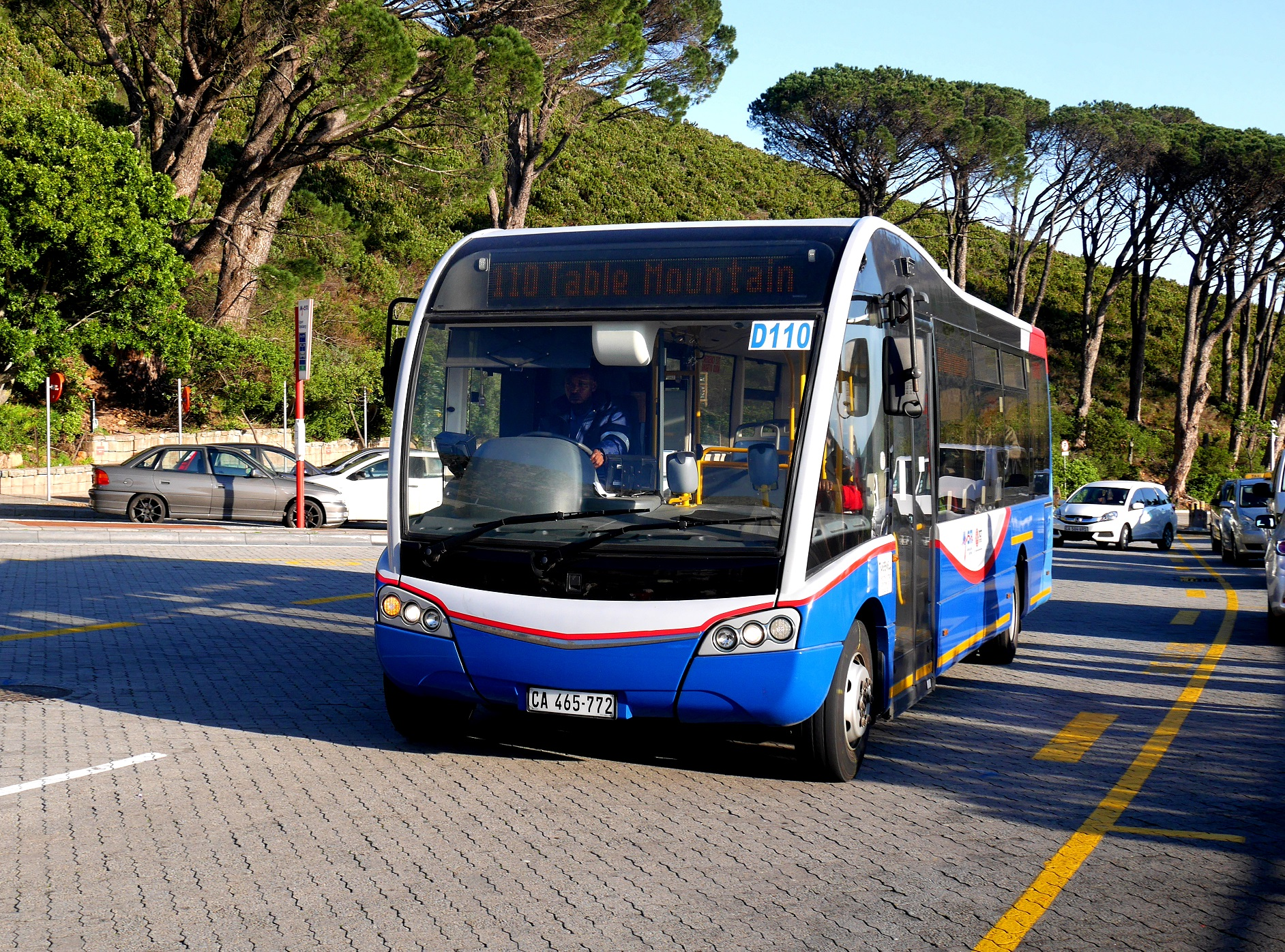
A MyCiTi BRT bus near Table Mountain in Cape Town

=== Bus rapid transit ===
Bus rapid transit (BRT) systems are established in some metropolitan areas in South Africa, and still under development in others.

Existing BRT networks include Cape Town's MyCiTi, Pretoria's A Re Yeng, and Johannesburg's Rea Vaya system.

MyCiTi is the most established BRT system in South Africa, with the City of Cape Town spending heavily on it, and other transport infrastructure expansion and modernization projects, to create an integrated metro transit network. As of 2026, MyCiTi operates a fleet of around 350 buses along 39 routes, on a network comprising 42 stations and almost 1,000 stops. Annual ridership in its 2025 report was 20 million.

=== Minibus Taxis ===
Minibus taxis are the most widely used mode of public transport in South Africa. This is due to their availability and affordability to the public. In 2021, there were 349,671 registered minibuses in South Africa with 73,953 unroadworthy or unlicensed minibuses. The taxi industry operates with minimal government subsidy and oversight.

Vehicles are often poorly maintained, and labour practices within the sector are not consistently regulated. Because many taxi owners own just a few taxis and each owner may choose to manage their business differently, there is not much known as to the inner workings of the industry. Efforts to formalise the industry have been ongoing since 1994, but as taxi organisations often don't abide by labour regulations, relationships between taxi operators and the state are often strained.

=== Carpooling ===
Carpooling, locally called “lift clubs” or “hikes”, is the practice of sharing a private vehicle for commuter or long-distance travel. Long established in informal community networks, it has gained renewed attention because of rising transport costs, road congestion and climate-policy goals. Cape Town's 2025 mobility strategy identifies carpooling as a key congestion-reduction measure but also highlights barriers such as the absence of explicit provisions for non-commercial ride-sharing in the National Land Transport Act (2009, amended 2016), inconsistent insurance cover, and safety concerns cited by 34% of surveyed commuters.

==== History and organisation ====
Informal lift clubs have been documented since at least the 1950s and expanded during the 1980s fuel-price shocks. Rural “hike” points—designated roadside waiting areas—remain common on major highways. To this date, most arrangements remain organised informally, often via Facebook groups or WhatsApp chats. International interest rose in 2007 when Logan Green cited Zimbabwean hitch-hiking culture as inspiration for founding the U.S. platform Zimride (later Lyft).

==== Recent developments ====
After a decade-long lull, carpooling rebounded in the mid-2020s amid public-transport constraints and increased institutional support. It supported the growth of digital platforms such as Crab a Ride, an AI powered carpooling platform, launched in 2024. Other platforms and projects focus on more niche markets, such as Circles for intra-company commuting, Liftsearch for transport between Limpopo and Gauteng, LyftClub for urban commuters, and university-specific services like Stellenbosch Lift Club.

==== Potential benefits and performance ====
Higher carpooling adoption leads to significant benefits that are now well established. French ride-sharing studies report that each regular carpooler avoids ≈0.5 t of CO_{2} annually and saves about US$2 000 in transport costs per person annually. Similar adoption in South Africa would yield significant economic and environmental benefit: over R260 million saved in fuel cost annually, removing 4 million cars from the road daily, while avoiding over 4.5 million tons of CO_{2} every year. For context, these CO_{2} savings equal roughly 9% of 2023 road-transport emissions, while the monetary savings exceed the annual budget of the Gauteng provincial government.

Finally, the comparative performance of carpooling with alternative modes of transport is well established and is summarised in the table below.

Mode	Average cost (R / km)	Door-to-door time (min)	Peak-hour reliability
Carpooling	1.2–1.8	35–45	87%
Minibus taxis	2.5–3.5	55–90	64%
Scheduled buses	4.0–6.0	60–120	58%

Source: National Household Travel Survey 2020; City of Cape Town Travel Demand Management Unit.

=== Passenger vehicle safety standards ===
The Road Traffic Management Corporation (RTMC), is the government agency responsible for road safety in South Africa. The agency reports to the South African Department of Transport, and is a member of the United Nations Road Safety Collaboration (UNRSC).

South Africa does not mandate a single unified passenger vehicle safety regime, like the European Union has, for example. Instead, the country uses a hybrid system where national regulations are blended with certain international standards, including those from the United Nations Economic Commission for Europe (UNECE).

All manufacturers and importers need to follow these regulations for any new vehicles sold in South Africa. Used vehicles are subject to roadworthy checks, and may fail to pass due to defects, in which case they cannot legally be driven on public roads. As part of vehicle safety regulations, used vehicle imports are generally not allowed into South Africa. Strict control measures ensure that only a limited number of import permits are issued to allow for used vehicles into South Africa.

==== AA-NCAP independent testing ====
Safety standards in general, including the mandating of certain features and build specifications for passenger vehicles sold in SA, have improved in recent years. This is in large part due to lobbying by the nonprofit Automobile Association of South Africa (AA). The AA, in partnership with the Global New Car Assessment Program (NCAP), runs the Safer Cars for Africa campaign. Through this program, the safety tests are conducted, and data is published. The AA advocates through the program for the implementation of improvements to vehicle safety.

In 2025, the AA-NCAP test results showed certain models of cars sold in South Africa perform extremely poorly in safety tests. Certain models have received a zero star rating, including Hyundai's Grand i10 subcompact hatchback. Other vehicles that have scored poorly in the same test include the Chery Tiggo 7, Renault Kwid, Nissan Magnite, Suzuki Ertiga, Suzuki Ignis, and Volkswagen Polo Vivo. South Africa's best-selling vehicle, the Toyota Corolla Cross, received just two stars in the test.

Vehicle manufacturers simply responded by stating that they comply with local safety regulations. Some consumers asked how manufacturers could justify providing a vehicle in a European market with various safety features equipped as standard, and then remove those as standard when selling those same vehicles in South Africa.

After receiving concerned queries from owners and general consumers, the AA stated in January 2026 that this kind of awareness was the entire point of its tests. The AA also stated that it purchased vehicles itself in South Africa, and then sent them for testing at the ADAC facility in Germany.

The AA said that its job is not to prescribe, but to inform. In other words, it aims to give consumers enough information to make their own informed purchase decisions, and it encouraged consumers to use the AA-NCAP safety ratings as part of that decision making. For existing owners of low-scoring vehicles, the AA recommended they transition, where possible, to safer cars. Finally, the organization noted that its range of vehicles tested is limited, but confirmed its goal of expanding its list of models sent for testing, both for the South African market, and for other countries on the continent.

In April 2026, it was reported that Hyundai and Chery had released new versions of the Grand i10 and Tiggo 7 respectively, inclusive of more safety features. The less safe trim levels remained on sale, however. The change in market offerings showed the positive impact that the AA's advocacy and lobbying could have.

=== Road transport safety ===
South Africa has an institutional framework for road safety led by the Road Traffic Management Corporation (RTMC). The country's transport laws follow global best practices, and the government has implemented and consistently updated legislation governing speed limits, drinking and driving, smoking in vehicles, motorcycle helmets, the wearing of seatbelts, child restraints, and mobile phone use, among others.

South Africa counts 26 deaths each year for 100,000 people (260 per million), a higher rate than the global average of 18 per 100,000 (180 per million).

In 2021, the country recorded 12,541 road fatalities for 11,726,476 vehicles (7.6 million motor vehicles and over 2.6 million light commercial vehicles). with "motor vehicle" including vehicles such as motorcycles and motor tricycles.

People killed in road accidents are mostly pedestrians with a percentage of 37.6%. Passengers suffer 32% of fatalities and drivers 27%.

58% of road deaths are attributed to alcohol use, which makes alcohol a leading factor in such fatalities. South Africa had the highest number of drunk driving incidents according to a WHO survey.

Pedestrians may be affected by a 60 km/h posted speed limit in residential and urban areas, a speed so excessive that it reduces pedestrians' chance of survival.

According to some sources, 31% of South African drivers wear seatbelts, while other sources claim a 45 to 60% compliance rate for drivers.

Vehicle maintenance issues cause 9% of road accidents, including tyres, brakes, and lights issues. When vehicle safety is involved, tyres are the first issue in 41% of vehicle factors.

When a crash is considered major, the crash type is often a head-on collision (44%), multi-vehicle (16%) or a T-Bone collision (15%).

== Railways ==
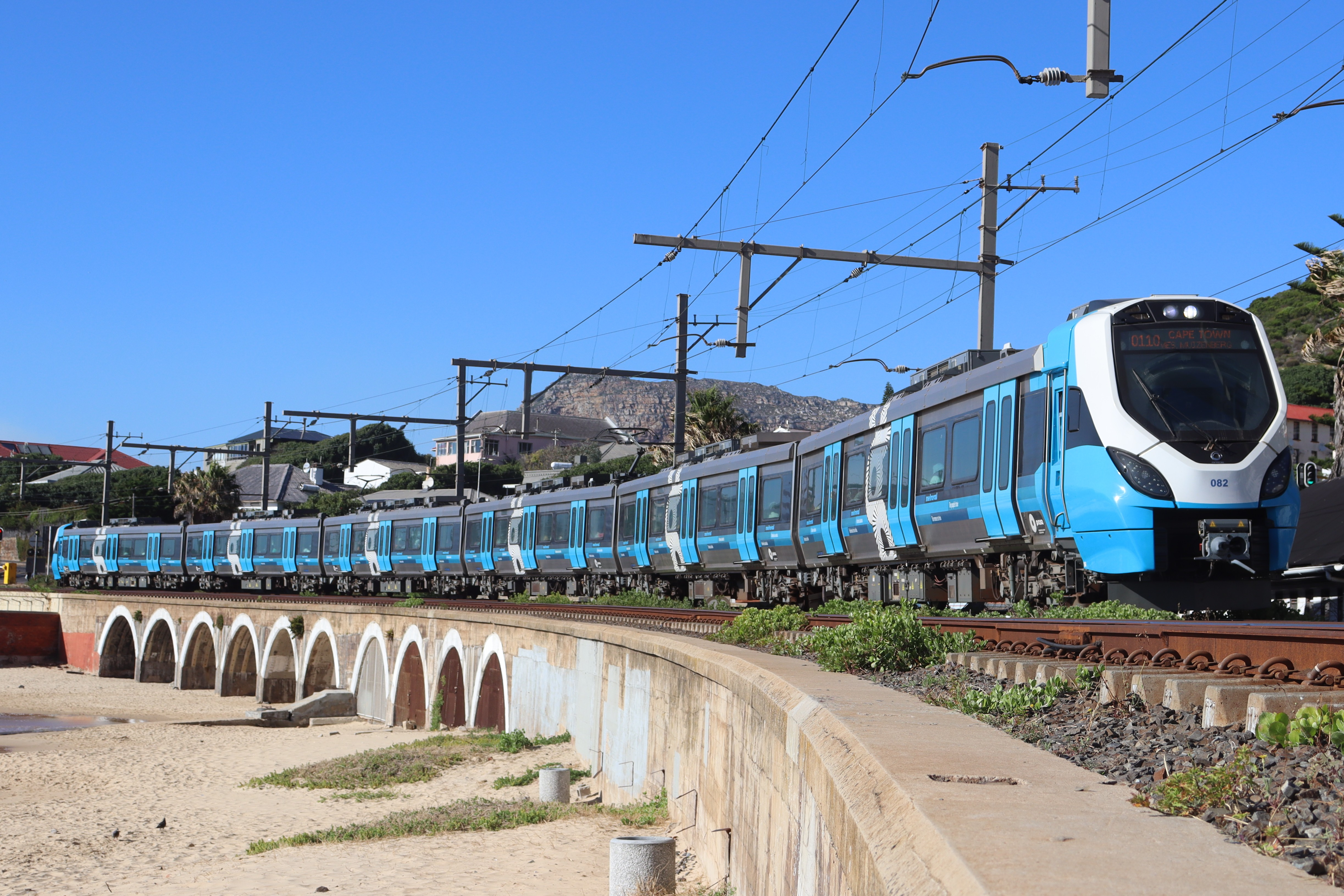
X'Trapolis Mega commuter train operating on the Metrorail Cape Town network

In 2000, South Africa had 20,384 km of rail transport, all of it narrow gauge. 20,070 km was 1,067 mm (3 ft 6 in) gauge (9,090 km of that electrified), with the remaining 314 km 610 mm (2 ft) gauge. The operation of the country's rail systems is accomplished by Transnet subsidiaries including Transnet Freight Rail, Shosholoza Meyl, PRASA, Transnet Engineering, and Protekon.

A feasibility study is to be conducted into the construction of a 720 km of 1,435 mm (4 ft 8 1/2 in) (standard gauge) line from Johannesburg to Durban for double-stack container trains.

In June 2010, the Gautrain opened between O.R. Tambo International Airport (ORTIA) and Sandton. This was the first stage of a standard gauge passenger line connecting Johannesburg, Pretoria, and ORTIA. The system has since been expanded, and is South Africa's only higher-speed rail system, and only rail network with large-scale underground infrastructure.

South Africa's rail network connects with neighbouring countries including Botswana, Namibia, Zimbabwe, and Mozambique.

=== Commuter rail ===
Commuter rail service within and around metropolitan areas is managed by local divisions of PRASA subsidiary Metrorail. These include such as Metrorail Western Cape, Metrorail Gauteng, and Metrorail KwaZulu-Natal.

In 2026, the South African Department of Transport approved a major rail modernization project (the National Rail Master Plan), which included inviting private companies to participate in rail operations. Importantly, the plan also allowed for the devolution of metro rail service management to municipalities. Direct administration of commuter rail networks by municipalities is something that was petitioned for by the City of Cape Town for many years, and welcomed by its mayor.

== Airports ==
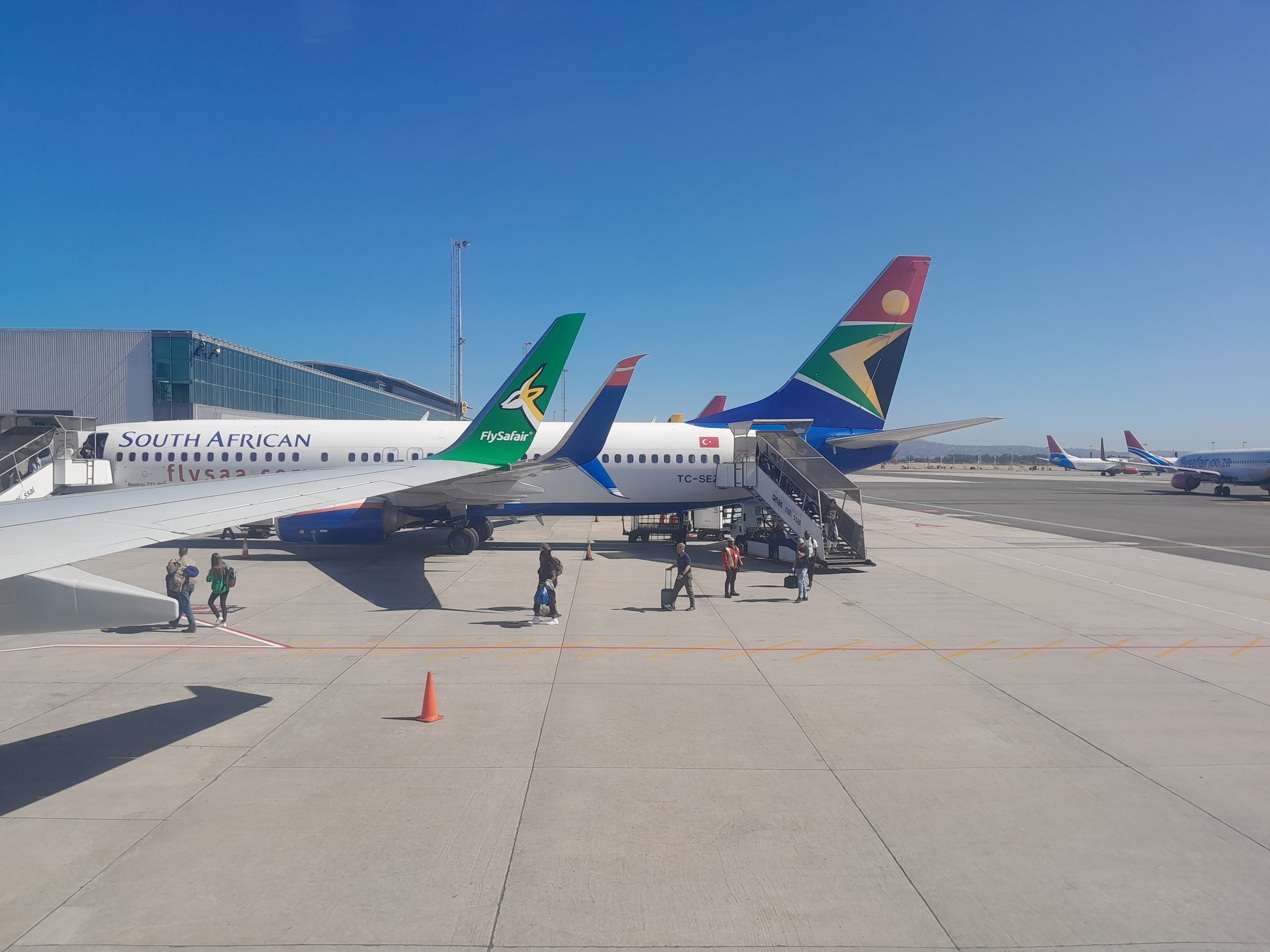
Planes at Cape Town International Airport

=== Runways in South Africa ===
Runway	<914 m	914/1 523 m	1 524/2 437 m	2 438/3 047 m	>3 047 m	Total
Paved	11	67	50	5	10	143
Unpaved	252	298	34			584

=== International Airports and Airlines ===
South Africa has international airports in four cities: Johannesburg, Cape Town, Durban and Nelspruit. The main international airports are in Johannesburg and, to a lesser extent, Cape Town. Nelspruit's international airport mainly serves travellers en route to the Kruger National Park.

Many international airlines travel to South Africa, giving travellers many options. These include British Airways, Delta Air Lines, Ethiopian Airlines, Kenya Airways, Qantas, Singapore Airlines, South African Airways, Swiss International Air Lines, Thai Airways, Turkish Airlines, Virgin Atlantic, Air Mauritius, Air Botswana, Air France, KLM, Lufthansa, Alitalia, Malaysia Airlines and Qatar Airways.

== Water ==
South Africa's major ports and harbours are Cape Town, Durban, East London, Mossel Bay, Port Elizabeth, Richards Bay and Saldanha Bay. In 2006, the new port is to open: Ngqura, at Coega, which is 20 km northeast of Port Elizabeth. The administration and operation of the country's port facilities are done by two subsidiaries of Transnet, the Transnet National Ports Authority and South African Port Operations (SAPO).

As of 2018, the merchant marine fleet included 15 vessels with a combined gross tonnage of 431,133GT

== Pipelines ==
South Africa has an extensive pipeline network for crude oil, refined petroleum, and natural gas. The system is primarily operated by Transnet Pipelines, a division of state-owned company Transnet. The pipeline network includes:

- 931 km for crude oil,
- 1,748 km for petroleum products,
- 322 km for natural gas.

== Tramways ==
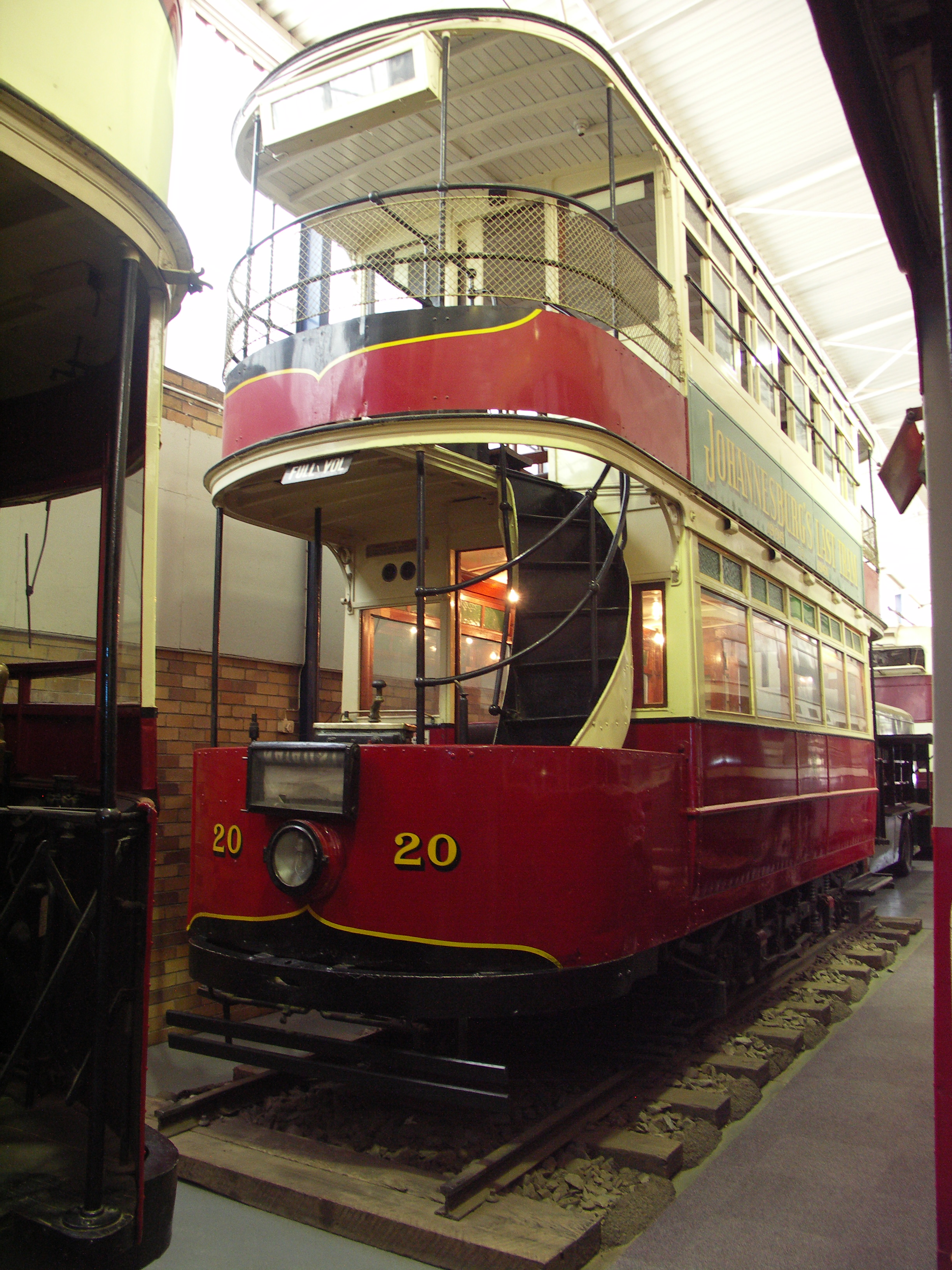
One of the last trams that were in use in Johannesburg on display at the James Hall Transport Museum

Many urban tramway systems operated in South Africa but no longer do so. The last system (in Johannesburg) began in 1890 as Rand Tramway (electrified in 1906) and ceased operations in 1961.

== See also ==
- Plug-in electric vehicles in South Africa
- Logistics in South Africa
