= Property tax in South Africa =

Property tax in South Africa encompasses a range of different kinds of taxes levied on property. These include municipal rates, tax on rental income, and property sales tax.

All property owners, unless specifically exempted from doing so, are obligated to pay these taxes to the relevant government entity. Certain property types and ownership types may receive tax rebates. Certain tax rates vary across jurisdictions in South Africa.

== Rates ==
Rates in South Africa refer to an ongoing property tax levied by municipal (local) governments on all types of non-exempt property. These rates are charged to property owners in accordance with Rate Tariff Sheets, which are maintained by the municipalities.

The collection of rates is permitted to South African municipalities by the Constitution of South Africa. Doing so is also mandated by the Municipal Property Rates Act (MPRA), which became law in 2004. Municipalities set their own rates bylaws based around the Act, taking their respective structure, finances, and goals into account.

Rates form an important part of municipal income, used as part of their respective budgets to finance running the municipality. For example, rates may fund the provision of municipal services to residents, or undertaking major public infrastructure projects.

=== Obligations ===
Since 2008, all South African municipalities have been obligated by the MPRA to collect rates from property owners within their jurisdictions. Property owners of detached homes and condos are obligated to pay these rates, unless they are exempt from doing so.

=== The setting of rates ===
==== Calculations ====
As an example, the City of Cape Town, which sets its rates annually in accordance with the Municipal Property Rates Act (MPRA) and the City's strategic objectives, takes the following into account when charging rates:

- The municipal property valuation
- A property's category in terms of what it's used for (zoning), and in some cases its ownership as well

A property is then charged rates according to a published Property Rates Tariff Sheet. Under South African law, a municipality is not allowed to levy rates on the first R15,000 of the value of a residential property.

In Cape Town's case, rates are charged as an amount-in-the-rand. The rate for residential properties is deemed the base rate, and the rates which are charged in respect of all other categories of properties are reflected as ratios to the residential rate.

==== Property valuations ====
Rates vary among municipalities, and are calculated according to a property's assessed value, and these figures are updated every few years, on what is known as the General Valuations Roll (GVR). Municipalities update their rolls at different times. For example, the most recent GVR in Cape Town was performed in 2022 (GVR2022), whereas Johannesburg's most recent roll was completed in 2023. Valuations are done to create a fair rating system for property taxes.

Municipal valuation projects often span several months and involve extensive data collection. Municipal councils typically engage professional property valuation firms to conduct these assessments. In these cases, the process requires careful coordination between municipalities and valuation professionals.

Valuers gather information about a variety of aspects, including property sales, building permits, and market trends. They also conduct physical inspections of representative properties within each area in which valuations are performed.

Municipal property valuations must be updated every four to five years, as per the MPRA. Certified property valuers conduct assessments using RICS Valuation Standards (The Red Book). The Royal Institution of Chartered Surveyors (RICS) is a professional body that sets qualifications and independently regulates chartered professionals and firms. With 130,000 members across 140 countries as of 2026, RICS works with both built and natural environments. At its core, the organization aims to promote and enforce the highest international standards in the valuation, management, and development of land, real estate, and infrastructure.

Generally speaking, the more a property is worth, the higher the rates charged. Valuations take into account any improvements made to the buildings on the property, such as through renovations, building extensions, and so forth.

Municipal property valuations are not tied in any way to a property's fair market value, which would be determined by a realtor, or buyers themselves, if a property was put up for sale. It is common for properties to be valued far higher in the real estate market than they are on municipal valuation rolls, and it is important for owners and buyers to differentiate between the two values.

Municipal valuations represent a professional opinion of property value at a specific date. In contrast, market value reflects what buyers actually pay in real transactions. Property markets change constantly. As such, when it comes to property sales, making date-specific assessments is essential for accurate valuations.

Likewise, municipal valuations are not the same as bank valuations. The latter serves mortgage lending purposes. Banks commission these assessments to determine the loan amounts they’re willing to provide each customer. The valuation protects both the lender and borrower by ensuring realistic property values.

In summary, municipal valuations aim for consistency across large property portfolios (i.e., all properties within municipal boundaries). Bank valuations differ in that they prioritize lending security. And finally, market valuations reflect individual transaction circumstances and negotiation outcomes. For bank and market valuations, date specificity is of high importance.

Property owners receive valuation notices before new rates take effect. These notices include the updated assessed value of their property, and explain how owners can appeal if they disagree. The appeals process provides a safety net for property owners who believe their assessments are incorrect. Property owners can submit appeals for municipal review within specified timeframes, and property values (and by extension, rates) will sometimes be amended. Successful appeals can reduce assessed values and future rates. However, unsuccessful appeals may result in costs for property owners. Before submitting an appeal, property owners are able to consult a professional valuation company to help determine whether or not the appeal is likely to be successful.

In an attempt to generate accurate, comprehensive assessments, professional commercial valuations often combine multiple valuation methods, such as:

- The market value approach, which compares similar properties in the same area that sold recently. This method works best for residential properties where sufficient sales data exists.
- The cost approach, which estimates what it would cost to rebuild the property at the time of valuation, and then subtracts depreciation based on the property's age and condition. This method suits unique properties or areas with limited sales data, and is often used for municipal buildings and specialized facilities.
- The income capitalization approach, which focuses on rental income potential. With this method, net operating income is calculated, and then appropriate capitalization rates are applied. The method therefore reflects the property’s ability to generate income for investors. It is therefore typically used for commercial and investment properties.

The most appropriate method is chosen based on property type and available data.

==== Property types ====
Rates are charged according to a property's zoning, which is determined by the municipality. Property types include:

- Nature conservation land
- Residential
- Agricultural
- Commercial
- Industrial
- Mining
- Properties owned by a social housing authority
- Government-owned properties used for the provision of public services
- Nonprofit properties
- Public Benefit Organisation (PBO) properties
- Public Service Infrastructure properties
- Vacant land

=== Collecting rates ===
Rates accounts are collected by means of municipalities sending monthly bills to property owners. These may be sent by mail, but are in recent years more frequently being sent by email. In the case of some municipalities, such as the City of Cape Town, email is the only method of sending bills, as has been the case in the metro since December 2025.

Some municipalities, like Cape Town, provide online platforms for ratepayers to manage their accounts. In the case of Cape Town, this is called eServices, and the platform is also used to manage other municipal matters, such as requests for building plans, and renewing motor vehicle licenses.

==== Rates accounts ====
Rates accounts (bills) include not only property tax, but also separate line items for fees, for municipal water, sewerage, and refuse removal services. Services are charged according to the degree to which they are used. For example, the more water a property uses in a given month, the more it will be charged, and the rate per kiloliter of water used may increase as the property enters new tariff billing categories.

These bills, while not exclusive to just rates (property tax), as they include service fees, are commonly referred to in SA as municipal rates accounts, or simply "rates".

Electricity supply is not part of municipal rates bills. For those who receive electricity bills, these are issued separately, either directly by the municipality or by national power producer Eskom. Many South Africans have prepaid electricity meters installed in their homes by their respective municipalities, and if this is the case, they will load their own power as needed, instead of receiving monthly electricity bills.

The amount of prepaid electricity loaded each month appears on their municipal rates bill merely as information for the user. However, it also appears as the municipality is able to claw back unpaid rates from prepaid electricity values.

=== Property sales ===
When a property is sold, during the transfer process, the municipality is informed that it will be transferred to a new owner. As such, the municipality begins billing the new owner for rates once transfer has completed.

As part of standard South African property sales processes, a property's existing owner will prepay a certain number of months of rates at the time of sale. This will then be credited back to them, as applicable, after the new owner begins paying the rates account. The municipality calculates and credits this as standard. Rates are thus payable from the date of registration in an owner's name.

=== Legislation ===
All property owners are obliged to pay rates and utilities in respect of their properties. Section 22, Title 9 of the Constitution of the Republic of South Africa states that municipalities can charge rates on property, and surcharges on fees for services provided by or on behalf of the municipality. These powers of municipalities are enshrined in the Municipal Systems Act 32 of 2000 (the Systems Act), and the Municipal Property Rates Act 6 of 2004 (as amended) (the Rates Act).

Certain categories of owners and certain categories of properties may attract different rates, exemptions, and rebates.

The Rates Act, published by the national Department of Cooperative Governance (now the Department of Cooperative Governance and Traditional Affairs). The Act has received amendments since it was promulgated.

Rateable properties are determined by Section 8 of the Act. Exempted properties are determined as per Section 15 of the Act.

== Tax on rental income ==
Income derived from renting a property (generally residential in nature) to a tenant attracts tax in South Africa, which is paid to the South African Revenue Service (SARS).

Residential accommodation includes:

- Investment properties bought for the purpose of renting to tenants
- Renting out a portion of the home in which one resides
- Holiday homes
- Guesthouses

When filing income tax each year, property owners are obligated to add the rental income they receive to any other income they receive. Each rental property's income, if an owner has more than one, should be declared separately. All rental properties should be included, regardless of whether the owner made a profit or loss on the particular property.

The rental income portion may be reduced by certain permissible expenses incurred in the production of the rental income. Any other amounts (in addition to the monthly rental) paid to property owners for the rental of residential accommodation are also subject to income tax.

Permissible expenses include:

- Rates
- Mortgage interest
- Realtor fees
- Homeowner's insurance
- Garden services
- Security services
- Repairs done to the rented area
- Levies
- Municipal service fees for water and electricity
- Accounting fees

The supply of a dwelling is an exempt supply for VAT purposes. As such, owners cannot deduct VAT incurred on these expenses.

== Property sales tax ==
=== Transfer duty ===
The sale of immovable property in South Africa attracts what is known as transfer duty. These duties are payable directly to SARS, and a sale cannot be concluded until the duties have been paid. Transfer duty is applicable to various kinds of property, including: Any relevant changes in transfer duties are announced in National Budget Speeches, which occur annually.

- Land and fixtures
- Real rights in land
- Rights to minerals
- Shares in residential property companies
- Any other immovable property

As of February 2026 (and in effect from April 2025), all properties with a value under R1.21 million are exempt from transfer duties.

Transfer duty is charged according to a progressive scale, set by SARS. In other words, duty percentages are for portions of the property value above a certain amount, not on the entire value of the property. Duties range from 3% to 13%.

Certain property sales are exempt from transfer duties. These are sales related to:

- Marriage in community of property
- Divorce settlements
- Inheritance
- Cancelled transactions

Transfer duty is distinct from transfer costs. The latter refers to fees paid to the conveyancing attorney appointed to manage the property transfer.

By law, a property sale in South Africa cannot be subject to both VAT and transfer duty. VAT always takes precedence when the seller is a registered VAT vendor.

=== Capital gains tax ===
Capital gains tax, introduced in South Africa in 2001, refers to taxes charged on the gains made (i.e., the increase in value) on a property. It is calculated according to any increase from the base cost to the sale price. The base cost is the purchase price plus plus any amounts spent on renovations or improvements, as well as a few other smaller costs.

The capital gains tax rate is set by SARS. Only 40% of the total capital gain (profit) is taxable income.

Capital gains tax applies to transactions including property sales, donations, and exchanges.

As of February 2026, the capital gains tax rate is 18% for individuals and special trusts, 21.6% for companies, and 36% for other trusts.

Exemptions from capital gains tax include:

- A R2 million gain or loss on the disposal of a primary residence
- Most personal use assets (such as a motor vehicle)
- Retirement benefits
- Payments in respect of original long-term insurance policies
- Specific small business exclusions
- A R40,000 annual capital gain or capital loss for individuals and special trusts

Property owners are obligated to declare capital gains when they file their income taxes. Foreigners who own property in South Africa are subject to withholding tax, which is charged at a rate of between 7.5% and 15%, depending on the category of seller. Withholding tax is not a final tax - foreign owners of South African property still need to establish their tax liability for the year relating to the sale, in order to determine whether they underpaid or overpaid tax on the sale of the property.

== See also ==
- Housing in South Africa
- Taxation in South Africa
