= RTMC =

RTMC may refer to:

- Road Traffic Management Corporation, the government agency tasked with overseeing road safety in South Africa.
- Royal Thai Marine Corps, the marines of the Royal Thai Navy.
- RTMC Astronomy Expo, a gathering of amateur astronomers, formally known as Riverside Telescope Makers Conference.
