= SANRAL =

South African state-owned road management company

The South African National Roads Agency Limited

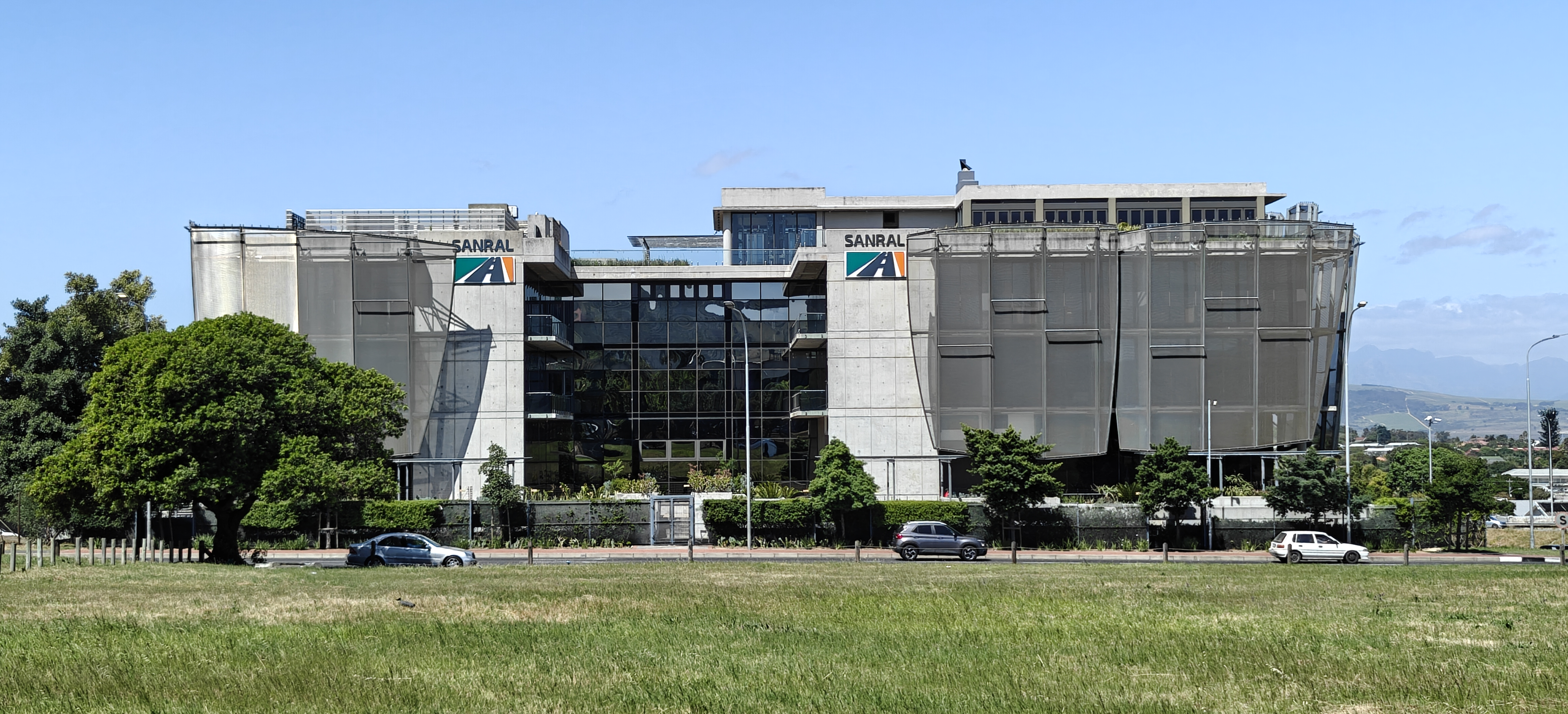
- Type: Government-owned public company
- Industry: Transport
- Predecessor: South African Roads Board
- Founded: 19 May 1998; 28 years ago, in Pretoria, South Africa
- Headquarters: Pretoria, Gauteng, South Africa
- Area served: South Africa
- Key people: Roshan Morar (Chairman); Skhumbuzo Macozoma (CEO)
- Services: Road management, maintenance, and development
- Revenue: R3.63 billion (2009)
- Operating income: R1.92 billion (2009)
- Net income: R1.01 billion (2009)
- Total assets: R30.6 billion (2009)
- Total equity: R798 million (2009)
- Owner: Government of South Africa
- Number of employees: 558 (2023)
- Parent: Department of Transport
- Website: nra.co.za

SANRAL (officially the South African National Roads Agency SOC Ltd) is a South African parastatal responsible for the management, maintenance, and development of South Africa's national road network.

The network includes many of the country's National ("N") roadways, as well as some of its Provincial and Regional ("R") ones.

SANRAL reports to the Department of Transport, headed by the Minister of Transport. SANRAL works alongside similar agencies, such as PRASA, ACSA, and the RTMC.

== History ==
SANRAL was created by The South African National Roads Agency Limited and National Roads Act, 1998 as a corporatized successor to the South African Roads Board, which was part of the Department of Transport. It was registered as a public limited company on 19 May 1998.

In 2011, SANRAL became the target of popular resentment, as tolling was about to commence on many of SANRAL's freeways in Gauteng, in order to finance their soon to be completed expansions, as part of the first phase of the Gauteng Freeway Improvement Project.

The GFIP was instituted to deal with the severe traffic congestion on Gauteng's freeways. The applicable Gauteng freeways were declared as e-toll highways and they began open road tolling on 3 December 2013. E-tolls were discontinued on 12 April 2024.

== Governance ==
SANRAL's only shareholder is the state, represented by the Minister of Transport. The agency is governed by an eight-member Board of Directors. Five voting members – the chairperson and four others – are appointed by the Minister of Transport for a term of three years.

Two government officials are non-voting members, one from the Department of Transport and nominated by the Minister of Transport, and the other from the National Treasury and nominated by the Minister of Finance. The chief executive officer, who is appointed by the Minister of Transport on the recommendation of the Board, is ex officio a non-voting member of the Board.

== Operations ==
SANRAL operates a head office and four regional offices; Northern Region (Gauteng, North West, Limpopo and Mpumalanga); Western Region (Western Cape and Northern Cape); Eastern Region (Free State and KwaZulu-Natal); and Southern Region (Eastern Cape). In 2009 the agency managed a total of 16,170 kilometres of roads, and by 2014, more than 22,000 kilometers.

SANRAL's operations are divided into two broad categories, namely toll roads, which are self-funding, and non-toll roads, which are funded by transfers from the Department of Transport. In 2014 toll roads constituted 14% (c. 3,000 km) of its responsibilities, and non-toll roads 86% (c. 19,000 km).

Some toll roads are concessions, privately funded and managed with supervision from SANRAL; these include the Platinum Highway (N1/N4), the Maputo Corridor (N4) and the N3 Toll Concession.

Other toll roads are owned and operated directly by SANRAL; these include the Huguenot Tunnel (N1), the Tsitsikamma Toll Road (N2), the N2 tolls on the KwaZulu-Natal coast, the Mariannhill Toll Road (N3), the N1 tolls in the Free State, Gauteng and Limpopo and the N17 tolls in Gauteng and Mpumalanga. It also owns and operates a tollgate on a provincial route (and not a national route), namely the Brandfort Toll Plaza on the R30 section of the R30/R730/R34 ZR Mahabane Highway north of Bloemfontein. It also owns and operates the two tollgates on the M4 freeway (Magalies Toll Route) west of Pretoria in Gauteng.

== Contributions to palaeontology and modern science ==
In the mid-1980s, a road bypass was constructed around Grahamstown (now Makhanda), to prevent traffic between Port Elizabeth and East London from driving through the townships following Apartheid uprisings (which were progressively getting more heated at the time), making it unsafe for motorists. In 1999 the newly constituted SANRAL tendered for upgrades of an unstable road cutting along this route. This road cutting contained an important 360 million year old fossil site previously researched by Robert W. Gess.

In 1999, SANRAL teamed up with Gess to assist with salvage blocks of a black shale from the cutting to prevent their loss to science. This and further salvage of shale blocks during further work on the cutting by SANRAL contractees in 2007–2008, and their subsequent ongoing excavation, led to the revelation of the now world renowned Waterloo Farm lagerstätte, the only estuarine fossil site in the world from about 360 million years ago, with exceptional soft-tissue preservation.

A few of the note-worthy fossils from Waterloo Farm include those of the first four-legged creatures (tetrapods) from Africa – Tutusius umlambo and Umzantsia amazana, as well as many other vertebrates such as Placodermi (e.g., Bothriolepis africana; Groenlandaspis riniensi), Acanthodii (e.g., Diplacanthus acus), Chondrichthyes (e.g., Antarctilamna ultima), Actinopterygii and Sarcopterigii (e.g., Serenichthys kowiensis).

Agnatha included the worlds oldest fossil lamprey (Priscomyzon riniensis), the recently described juvenile which overturned our assumptions about vertebrates ancestry. The site has also revealed invertebrate remains including the scorpion Gondwanascorpio emzantsiensis, the oldest land animal from Gondwana, and a diverse flora of plants including Archaeopteris notosaria, Africa's earliest woody tree. In addition to numerus undescribed taxa and those currently being described (Housed at the Devonian Ecosystems Lab, Albany Museum, Makhanda), Gess and his team still has decade's worth of work ahead from the excavated blocks that were rescued from the road works with the help of SANRAL.

== See also ==
- National Route (South Africa)
- Roads in South Africa
- Transport in South Africa
- e-toll (South Africa)
