= Taxation in South Africa =

South African national government budget breakdown for 2024/25

Constituents of South African taxation receipts for the tax year 2024/25
1. Personal income tax (39.5%)
2. VAT (24.7%)
3. Company income tax (17.4%)
4. Customs duties (4.10%)
5. Capital gains tax (1.00%)
6. Transfer duties (0.67%)
7. Other (12.6%)

Taxation in South Africa is a well-established and robust system, and generally involves payments to a minimum of two different levels of government; the national government through the South African Revenue Service (SARS), and local government by means of measures such as rates.

Prior to 2001 the South African tax system was "source-based", where in income is taxed in the country where it originates. Since January 2001, the tax system was changed to "residence-based" wherein taxpayers residing in South Africa are taxed on their income irrespective of its source. Non residents are only subject to domestic taxes.

Central government revenues come primarily from income tax, value added tax (VAT) and corporation tax. Local government revenues come primarily from grants from central government funds and municipal rates. In the 2018/19 fiscal year SARS collected R 1 287.7 billion (equivalent to US$ 86.4 billion) in tax revenue, a figure R71.2 billion (or 5.8%) more than that from the previous fiscal year.

In 2018/19 financial year, South Africa had a tax-to-GDP ratio of 26.2% that was only slightly more than the 25.9% in 2017/18. The cost of collecting tax revenue has remained somewhat constant; decreasing slightly from 0.93% of total revenue in 2016/17 to 0.89% in 2017/18, while the 2018/19 financial year showed a further improvement in the cost of revenue collection, which dropped to 0.84%.

Three of the provinces of South Africa contributed 77.8% of the total tax revenue: Gauteng (49.0%), Western Cape (15.5%), and KwaZulu-Natal (13.3%). The provinces with the smallest contributions were the Northern Cape (1.3%), followed by Free State (3.2%) and North West (3.3%)

== Overview ==
The South African Revenue Service (SARS) is responsible for the collection of taxes within the Republic of South Africa. The mandate and vision of the South African Revenue Service, quoted from their website, is to:

- Collect all revenues due.
- Ensure optimal compliance with Tax, Customs and Excise legislation.
- Provide a customs and excise service that will facilitate legitimate trade as well as protect our economy and society.
- SARS is driven by the aspiration to contribute directly to the economic and social development of the country by collecting the revenue due to enable government to deliver on its constitutional obligations, policy and delivery priorities in pursuance of better life for all in South Africa. By encouraging tax and customs compliance, we also aspire to contribute to the building of fiscal citizenship reflected by a law abiding society.
- The anchor for SARS to deliver on this mandate is the higher purpose and values which drives and informs all SARS employees' behaviour."

=== Number of taxpayers ===
On 31 March 2019, the tax register of SARS had in excess of 26 million entries, excluding the following: 1) those cases where the persons or entities were suspended; 2) estates; and 3) entities with unknown addresses. Individuals made up 79% of the entries with an aggregate income of R1.7 trillion. The tax register increased to more than 27 million entries for 2020.

In 2019, of the 22.1 million individual taxpayers only 6.6 million (31%) were expected to submit tax returns, while in 2020 the number of individual tax payers increased to 22.9 million but the number expected to submit tax returns fell to 6.3 million (27.5%).

Furthermore, in 2019 only 4.9 million taxpayers (23%) submitted returns and were assessed. Of the assessed taxpayers only 882 000 (18%) owed SARS some tax, 11.3% had a zero assessment and 70.7% received refunds. Furthermore, of the 4.9 million assessed tax payers 1.9 million (40.2%) were from the Gauteng province and 1.3 million (27.3%) were in the 35 – 44 age bracket.

Tax Register & Quick comparison of statistic for 2019 and 2020
Category	Tax register		Expected to Submit		Collection	
Category	2019	2020	2019	2020	2019	2020
Individuals	22 170 513	22 919 701	6 562 568	6 308 515	R493.8bn^{1}	R529.2bn^{1}
Companies	2 020 759	2 548 975	991 207	939 781	R214.4bn	R215.0bn^{2}
Trusts	357 859	363 860				
Employers (PAYE)	552 611	582 289				
VAT vendors	802 957	831 821	448 710	449 597	R324.8bn^{3}	R346.8bn^{3}
Importers	319 949	329 820			R55.0bn^{4}	R55.4bn^{4}
Exporters	288 604	297 448				

Notes:

1. Includes PAYE
2. Includes interest on overdue income tax
3. Nett VAT (incl. payments, refunds, etc.)
4. Customs Duties

=== Categories of Tax ===
Direct taxes are taxes which are imposed on individuals, trusts, deceased estates, companies and close corporations; all of whom are otherwise known as persons. Indirect taxes are collected by an intermediary from the person who bears the ultimate economic burden of the tax. The intermediary later files a tax return and forwards the tax proceeds to government with the return. Of the R1 216 billion collected by SARS in 2017/2018, 93% (or R1 133 billion) came from taxes on both Personal and Company Income and Profits, and taxes on Domestic Goods and Services, a combination of both direct and indirect taxes.

Categories of Tax within South Africa
Type of tax	Revenue in Rands 2017/18	Percentage of Total Revenue
Income and Profits	R 711.7 bn	58.5%
Payroll and workforce	R 16.0 bn	1.3%
Property	R 16.5 bn	1.4%
Domestic goods and services	R 422.2 bn	34.7%
International trade and transactions	R 49.9 bn	4.1%
Miscellaneous State Revenue	(R 0.0024 bn)	-0.0%
Total	R 1 216 bn	100%

The revenue obtained by SARS in the 2017/18 financial year for each of the above categories is further explained below.

== Offences under the tax act ==
The Tax Administration act, 2011 deals with offences regarding tax. A person commits an offence if they fail to:

- submit a tax return or document to SARS; or
- fail to issue a document to a person as needed; or
- fail to register or amend a registration in the instance where registered details have changed; or
- keep records as needed by SARS; or
- knowingly submit a false tax certificate or statement; or
- refuse or neglect to take an oath or make a solemn declaration.

A person convicted of these offences may be liable to a fine or imprisonment not exceeding two years.

=== Tax loopholes ===
Various tax loopholes have been identified by SARS over the years and have been successfully closed. These include:

- cross-border mismatches, insurance payments and interest exemptions;
- interest cost allocation for finance operations;
- transfer pricing; and
- certain classes of preference and guaranteed shares.

== Direct Taxes on Income and Profit ==
In the 2018/19 financial year, SARS collected R758.8 bn from taxes on Income and Profits. The table below gives a breakdown of this revenue.

Breakdown of tax revenues from Income and Profits 2018/19
Type of tax	Amounts in Rands	Percentage of total
Persons and Individuals	R493.8 bn	65.1%
Companies	R214.4 bn	28.3%
Dividends Tax^{1}	R 29.9 bn	3.9%
Other^{2}	R20.7 bn	2.7%
Total	R758.8 bn	100%

Notes:

1. Dividends Tax & Secondary Tax on Companies combined for 2018/19 tax year
2. Includes tax on retirement funds, small business tax amnesty proceeds and withholding tax on interest

== Taxes on Persons and Individuals ==
Any person who receives an income within South Africa has to be registered for tax purposes and if any employees of a company doing business within South Africa are registered for tax purposes with SARS, the company must register as an employer with SARS. Furthermore, any Tax-registered company has to register its employees with SARS, irrespective of their tax status.

Personal income tax is South Africa's largest source of revenue. In 2017/18 it contributed 38.1% of the total tax revenue.

Breakdown of tax revenues from Persons and Individuals 2017/18
Type of tax	Amounts in Rands	Percentage of total
Pay-as-you-earn	R 446 bn	96.4%
Provisional tax	R 29 bn	6.4%
Assessment payments	R 16 bn	3.5%
Employment Tax incentives	(R 4.3 bn)	-0.9%
Refunds	(R 26.8 bn)	-5.8%
Interest on overdue tax	R 1.95 bn	0.4%
Total	R 463 bn	100%

=== Personal income tax brackets ===
There was no change in the personal income tax table for the period 1 March 2024 to 28 February 2025.

Income Tax: Individuals and Trusts (2024/25)
Taxable Income	Rate of Tax
0 – R237 100	18% of taxable income
R237 101 – R370 500	R42 678 + 26% of taxable income above R237 100
R370 501 – R512 800	R77 362 + 31% of taxable income above R370 500
R512 801 – R673 000	R121 475 + 36% of taxable income above R512 800
R673 001 – R857 900	R179 174 + 39% of taxable income above R673 000
R857 901 – R1 817 000	R251 258 + 41% of taxable income above R857 900
R1 817 001 and above	R644 489 + 45% of taxable income above R1 817 000

== Taxes on Companies ==
The Income Tax Act, No 58 of 1962 defines a company under South African law. Nearly 3.7 million companies were on the tax register in March 2017 but only 3.1 million in March 2018. Of these only 24.2% reported positive taxable income, while 48.3% reported zero taxable income and 27.4% reported negative taxable income.

SARS collected R220.2 bn from companies in the 2017/18 financial year as per the table below.

Breakdown of tax revenues from Companies 2017/18
Type of tax	Amounts in Rands	Percentage of total
Provisional Tax	R 218.6 bn	99.3%
Assessment payments	R 11.8 bn	5.4%
Royalties	R 0.6 bn	0.3%
Refunds	(R 13.6 bn)	-6.2%
Interest on overdue tax	R 2.8 bn	1.3%
Total	R 220.2 bn	100%

== Taxes on Property ==
In the 2017/18 financial year SARS collected R16.5 bn in taxes on property.

Breakdown of tax revenues from Property 2017/18
Type of tax	Amounts in Rands	Percentage of total
Donations tax	R 0.7 bn	4.4%
Estate Duty	R 12.2 bn	13.8%
Securities Transfer Tax	R 5.8 bn	35.2%
Transfer Duties	R 7.7 bn	46.6%
Total	R 16.5 bn	100%

== Taxes on Goods and Services ==
In the 2017/18 financial year SARS collected R422.2 bn in domestic taxes on goods and services.

Breakdown of Domestic tax revenues on Goods and Services 2017/18
Type of tax	Amounts in Rands	Percentage of total
Value-Added Tax (VAT)	R 298.0 bn	70.58%
Specific excise duties	R 37.4 bn	8.86%
Ad Valorem excise duties	R 3.8 bn	0.9%
Fuel Levy	R 70.9 bn	16.79%
Environmental taxes	R 11.2 bn	2.65%
Other*	R 0.9 bn	0.21%
Total	R 422.2 bn	100%

*Includes Universal Service Fund, Turnover Tax for Micro Businesses, Tyre Levy and International Oil Pollution Compensation Fund

=== Value-Added Tax (VAT) ===
The VAT component of the tax revenue SARS collected in 2017/18 can be further broken down into Domestic VAT and Imported VAT, as per the table below:

Breakdown of tax revenues on VAT 2017/18
Type of tax	Amounts in Rands	Percentage of total
Domestic VAT	R 336.2 bn	68.8%
Import VAT	R 152.8 bn	31.2%
VAT Refunds	(R 191.0 bn)	-39.1%
Total	R 298 bn	100%

=== Fuel Levy ===
The Fuel Levy component (R70.9 bn in 2017/18) of the Domestic tax revenue on Goods and Services can be further broken down as per the table below.

Breakdown of the Fuel Levy 2017/18
Type of tax	Amounts in Rands	Percentage of total
Fuel Levy	R 72.1 bn	101.7%
Road Accident Fund (RAF)	R 1.8 bn	2.6%
Diesel Refunds	(R 3.0 bn)	-4.3%
Total	R 70.9 bn	100%

== Taxes on International Trade and Transactions ==
In the 2017/18 financial year SARS collected R49.9 bn in taxes on International trade and transactions.

Breakdown of Domestic tax revenues on International Trade and Transactions 2017/18
Type of tax	Amounts in Rands	Percentage of total
Customs Duties	R 49.1 bn	98.4%
Miscellaneous customs and excise receipts	R 0.7 bn	1.4%
Diamond export levy	R 0.09 bn	0.2%
Total	R 49.9 bn	100%

== Explanation of tax types within South Africa ==
Income tax in South Africa was first introduced in 1914 with the introduction of the Income Tax Act No 28, an act that had its origins in the New South Wales Act of 1895. The act has gone through numerous amendments with the act presently in force is the Income Tax Act No 58 of 1962 which contains provisions for four different types of income tax. These four types of tax are:

- normal tax
- donations tax
- secondary tax on companies
- withholding tax

=== Capital gains tax ===
Capital gains Tax (CGT) includes all profits acquired from the sale of capital assets such as vehicles, real estates and others. Capital Gains are only taxable when the capital assets are sold or disposed of and are included in an individual or companies taxable income.

First introduced on 1 October 2001, capital gains tax is effectively charged by adding a percentage of the increase in value of an asset, that was disposed of for more than its base cost, to the taxpayer's taxable income (see normal tax). For individuals, deceased estates and special trusts 40% of the net gain exceeding R 40 000 exclusion for individuals is added to their taxable income. For companies, close corporations and trusts 80% is added. Net capital losses in any given year cannot be used as a set-off against ordinary income; but can be carried forward to the following years to be used as a set-off against future capital gains

Capital gains tax is not payable on money or property inherited. If there is CGT payable it is usually the estate which is held liable. (See Inheritance Tax).

SARS determines capital gain (or loss) on the disposal of an asset relative to the base cost of the asset. For most assets, the base cost is the price at which the asset was purchased. If the asset was held before 1 October 2001, the base cost is deemed to be the assessed value of the asset on 1 October 2001. Any profit made on the disposal of the asset would then be the capital gain.

There are a few exceptions. Example 1: When shares are bought and sold the profit made from the disposal of the shares might be deemed by SARS to be capital in nature, or income in nature. If the disposal is capital in nature only 40% for natural person (80% for companies) of the profit is added to taxable income. If the disposal is deemed to be income then 100% is added to taxable income. The determining factor for SARS in this instance is the intention behind the purchase of the shares. Generally, SARS views profit on the disposal of any shares held for more than 3 years to be capital in nature.

Example 2: Investments in Venture Capital (VC) Companies (so-called Section 12J Companies) are exempt from taxation at the time of the investment. After the period of investment the VC company will return the initial investment plus (or minus) any profit (or loss). In this instance, the base cost of the investment is deemed by SARS to be R0 (zero Rand). This means that the entire initial investment and any profit on disposal is subject to GCT.

In line with the changes in tax residence implemented with the 2019/20 budget, taxation of capital gains has become of greater interest. For resident taxpayers earning in excess of R1 million from offshore sources, the only means to legally avoid the 45% tax is to emigrate one's tax status. One effect of this process is the immediate triggering of capital gains tax liability on all assets the taxpayer has in South Africa. Capital gains taxation is triggered when an asset is disposed of by:

- sale;
- loss;
- donation;
- exchange;
- the death of the tax payer;
- the physical emigration of the taxpayer; or
- the tax emigration of the taxpayer.

The specific exclusions of capital gains tax, namely:

- R2 million gain (or loss) on disposal of a primary residence;
- personal use assets;
- retirement benefits;
- payments made in respect of long term insurance policies;
- R40 000 annual exclusion of capital gains (or loss) for individuals and special trusts;
- R300 000 once-off exclusion on death of individuals in the year of death. This replaces the annual exclusion;
- R1.8 million once-off exclusion on disposal of small businesses under R10 million

apply to tax emigration.

Maximum effective tax rates for Capital gains remain:

- 18% for individuals and special trusts;
- 22.4% for companies; and
- 36% for other trusts.

=== Company income tax ===
The company income tax rate is levied at 28% (According to the Company Law No. 71 of 2008, as amended) of the taxable income of the company. This was not changed in the 2018/19 Budget. Certain companies qualify as a small business corporation (see tax table below). Employment companies pay a tax of 33%. Dividends were subject to an additional tax called the Secondary Tax on Companies which was 10% of declared dividends. This tax was replaced by Dividend Tax on 1 April 2012; however Secondary Tax on Companies credits was still used by some companies until 31 March 2015. Again the lowest tax bracket for Small Business Corporations was adjusted in the 2020/21 budget, creating a small tax saving for these businesses.

Small Business Tax
Taxable Income	Tax Rate
R0 – R83 100	0%
R83 101 – R365 000	7% of the value above R83 100
R365 001 – R550 000	R19 733 + 21% of the value above R365 000
R550 001 and above	R58 583 + 28% of the value above R550 000

In the 2017/18 tax year 24.2% (993 069) of 3.7 million companies in South Africa had taxable income. Of them, 57.7% of the tax was paid by 370 large companies (0.2% of all companies) with a taxable income in excess of R200 million. Around 70% of the tax collected was from the finance, manufacturing, and retail and wholesale trade sectors. In 2017/18 the mining and quarrying sector represented only 0.7% of all companies in South Africa and provided 7.2% of the assessed tax, reflecting the declining importance of the mining sector to the South African economy

=== Dividends tax ===
Dividends Tax is a policy tax imposed by government with the aim of encouraging companies to retain profits instead of giving out dividends. It takes the form of a 20% tax on receipt of dividends given by companies and closed corporations. With the imposition of a highest income tax bracket of 45% on individuals, dividends tax was increased at the same time to prevent capital gains tax vs dividends tax arbitrage situations involving high net worth individuals.

Prior to 1 April 2012 this tax was known as the Secondary Tax on Companies and took the form of a 10% tax on the net dividend distributed by companies and closed corporations.

Dividends tax is considered a form of Withholding tax. An annual exemption of R23,800 (for taxpayers under 65 years) and R34,500 (for taxpayers 65 and over) applies to Dividends tax. From 1 March 2012 the exemption on foreign dividends earned by South African residents was scrapped.

The dividends received by South African resident individuals from REITs are subject to income tax, not dividends tax. Non-residents receiving those dividends are subject only to dividend tax.

Foreign dividends earned by South African resident individuals, where such individuals own less than 10% of the foreign shareholding of that company, is taxable at "a maximum effective rate of 20%."

No changes was made with regards to dividends in the 2020/21 Budget.

=== Donations tax ===
Tax on donations is linked to Estate Duty which was first introduced in South Africa in 1955. It is not a tax on income but rather on the transfer of wealth but differs from estate duty in that it specifically taxes gifts and donations as opposed to inheritance. As of 1 March 2018, this tax subjects cumulative donations in excess of R30 million made by persons to a flat rate of 25%. Natural persons have an annual exemption of R100 000. For taxpayers who are not natural persons, the exempt donations are limited to casual gifts not exceeding R10 000 per annum in total. Donations between spouses, South African group companies and donations to certain public benefit organisations are exempt from donations tax.

See also Inheritance tax / Estate duty and Donation tax deduction

=== Environmental Taxes ===
The South African Government has responded to the global challenge of climate change by introducing several environmental taxes. These are intended to modify the behaviour of the country's citizens. Taxes on international trade and transactions (including the Diamond Export levy) are sometimes also included in this category.

==== CO_{2} tax on motor vehicle emissions ====
The aim of this tax is to encourage owners of motor vehicles in South Africa to become more energy efficient and environmentally friendly. The tax is charged on the mass of CO_{2} gas emitted per km driven, specifically each gram of CO_{2} emitted above 120g CO_{2} per km driven. This tax was introduced in September 2010 for passenger vehicles at R75 and increased to R90 in 2013, R100 in 2016 and R110 in April 2018.

For double-cab vehicles the tax is on CO_{2} emitted above 175g CO_{2} per km driven. The tax was introduced in March 2011 at R100 and increased to R125 in 2013, R140 in 2016 and R150 in April 2018. This levy generated R1.39 billion in the 2018/19 period.

==== Electricity levy ====
This tax applies to electricity generated from non-renewable sources and was introduced in July 2009 at a rate of 2 cents per kWh. The levy was increased in July 2012 to 3.5 cents per kWh. In 2018/19 the tax income for this levy was R8.4 billion.

==== Health Promotion levy ====
On 1 April 2018 this tax was imposed on sugary beverages "in support of the Department of Health's deliverable to decrease diabetes, obesity and other related diseases." It applies to beverages with more than 4g of sugar per 100ml and is payable by the manufacturers. It is a domestic consumption tax and therefore does not apply to sugary beverages that are locally produced for export (or as part of other exported goods). It is payable on goods imported into South Africa for local consumption. It generated R3.25 billion in the 2018/19 period, with levies on imports accounting for only 1.6% of that figure.

==== Incandescent light bulb levy ====
This tax seeks to promote energy efficiency and reduce electricity demand by encouraging the use of energy saving light bulbs. On 1 November 2009 this tax was introduced at a rate of R3 per bulb. The tax was increased to R4 in April 2013, R6 in April 2016 and R8 per bulb in April 2018. R41 million was generated by this levy in 2018/19.

==== International air passenger departure tax ====
This tax is imposed on international air travel. It was introduced in November 2000 at a rate of either R50 or R100 per passenger depending on their international destination. On 1 October 2011 the departure tax rate was changed to R190 per passenger on all international flights, excluding those to Botswana, Lesotho, Namibia and Eswatini which are taxed at R100.

==== Plastic bag levy ====
This tax was aimed at reducing litter and encouraging plastic bag reuse and recycling. In June 2004, the plastic bag levy was introduced at a rate of 3 cents a bag on some types of plastic shopping bags. The levy was increased to 4 cents from April 2009, 6 cents from April 2013, 8 cents from April 2016 and 12 cents from April 2018. From 1 April 2018 it was increased to 12 cents per bag and created a tax income in the 2018/19 tax year of R300 million. The 2020/21 budget saw the levy increase to 25 cents per bag.

==== Tyre levy ====
This tax was implement on 1 February 2017 with the aim of reducing waste and/or disposal into landfills while also encouraging reuse, treatment and recycling of pneumatic tyres. All new tyres are subject to the levy (payable by the manufacturers) which is calculated on the nett mass of the tyre. In 2018/19 the tyre levy generated R730 million in taxes.

=== Exchange Controls ===
Exchange controls relate to two broad areas: 1) Transactions involving foreign currency purchases or sales. Such transactions are recorded by financial institutions and submitted to SARS. Taxpayers are required abide by the limits imposed on the transaction of foreign currency. On 5 November 2010 the lifetime limit for individuals of R4 million was replaced with an annual limit. On 1 April 2015 the annual limit was increased to R10 million. Taxpayers who desire to transact in excess of the annual limit may apply to SARS for clearance to do so. On emigration, the limits are from R8 million to R20 million per family unit.

2) Direct foreign investments, which are often mediated by the DTI. BEE policies from 15 February 2006 require South African corporates and certain parastatals to have at least a 25% interest in these investments. Such investments generally require large transactions involving foreign currency and are subject to exchange controls. As from 1 April 2015, authorised companies may process corporate investments of up to R 1 billion per year, as well as carrying forward any unused allowances from previous years.

As from 1 April 2015, credit cards for both corporates and individuals may be used for foreign transactions.

In the past several decades South Africans had accumulated illegal offshore income and assets. From June 2003 to February 2004 an exchange control amnesty was implemented which allowed such individuals the opportunity to "regularise" their affairs. This amnesty would have had the dual outcomes of broadening the tax base and regularising taxpayers' affairs without prosecution. 42 672 applications were reviewed covering assets totalling R 68.6 billion.

=== Expatriates tax ===
A major change to the residence-based tax system was implemented with the 2019/20 budget. Previously the standard for the residence basis of taxation was 181 days, i.e. if a taxpayer was not present in South Africa for 181 days in any 12-month period they would not be considered resident in South Africa for tax purposes. The change in 2019/20 budget sees South African residents who are working overseas as residing in South Africa irrespective of the number of days they are physically present in South Africa.

Such taxpayers are subject to 45% tax on any foreign income earned in excess of R1 million. Income includes remuneration, interest, dividends and fringe benefits. This is applicable to individuals, companies, close corporations, trusts and estates and is subject to foreign tax credit where applicable dual taxation agreements are in force.

=== Foreign entertainers and sportpersons ===
Non-resident entertainers and sportspersons are taxed at 15% on the gross amount payable to them for their activities as entertainers or sportspersons.

=== Fringe benefits ===
Fringe benefits include items, services, and use of items or services which are not directly related to the nature of the business for which the taxpayer is employed. Fringe benefits result in an increase in the taxpayer's remuneration for the purposes of calculating PAYE and thus are taxed at the taxpayers usual tax rate (unless otherwise specified).

==== Employer-owned vehicles ====
Generally a fringe benefit of 3.5% of the determined value (cash cost plus VAT) of the vehicle per month is added to the taxpayer's remuneration. However, if the vehicle is covered by a maintenance plan this benefit is reduced to 3.25%. If the vehicle is obtained under lease, the determined monthly value is the monthly cost under the lease plus the cost of fuel.

As with a travelling allowance, 80% of the fringe benefit is included in the taxpayer's remuneration, unless the vehicle is used for business purposes at least 80% of the time, then the percentage is reduced to 20%. The fringe benefit is further reduced by the ratio of the annual distance travelled for business versus the total distance travelled annually as substantiated by a log book.

Further relief is available for cost of licence, insurance, maintenance, fuel for private travel if the full cost of these items had been borne by the taxpayer and substantiated by a log book.

==== Interest-free or low-interest loans ====
This covers loans given by the employer to the tax payer at a lower rate than the official interest rate. The difference between the interest charged by the employer and the official interest rate is included in the taxpayer's gross income.

==== Residential accommodation ====
This tax covers accommodation supplied by the employer but does not apply to holiday accommodation hired by the employer from an institution not connected to the employer. The value of the benefit is calculated by applying a prescribed formula, available on the SARS website. If the employer does not have full ownership of the property the benefit is defined as the cost to the employer.

=== Fuel levy ===
The Fuel levy, also known as "General Fuel Levy", is a tax payable by the licensed manufacturers of petroleum products within South Africa. Petroleum products include petrol, diesel, kerosene (household paraffin) and biodiesel. If consumed within the RSA these products are also subject to Excise Duty and the Road Accident Fund (RAF) levy. In April 2018, the fuel levy was R3.37 per litre, which represented 23.7% of the price of 93 octane fuel (inland).

The Road Accident Fund is a state insurer that provides insurance cover to all drivers of motor vehicles in South Africa in respect of liability incurred or damage caused as a result of a traffic collision. In April 2018 the road accident fund (RAF) contribution to the fuel price was R1.93 or 13.6%.

The diesel refund system was introduced on 4 July 2001 as a way to promote international competitiveness in the fishing, farming, forestry and mining industries. On 1 October 2007 the scheme was extended to include electricity generation for peak demand where the power plants in question used petroleum fuels and generated in excess of 200MW. The purpose to which the fuel is employed determines the diesel refund rate. For example, farmers are entitled to 100% refund of the RAF levy. The rates are adjusted annually. The refunds are administered via the VAT system and are offset against VAT payable.

In the 2020/21 budget the fuel levy was increased by 16 cents per litre and the road accident fund levy by 9 cents per litre.

=== General Sales Tax ===
This was a system of taxation of goods that was replaced by Value Added Tax in 1990. It was first introduced in 1978 at a rate of 4%. The final increase in the tax rate was in May 1989 which raised it to 13%.

=== Individual income tax ===
In March 1988 Standard Income Tax on employees (SITE) was introduced to limit the number of personal income tax returns. This system was repealed on 1 March 2011 and phased out from 2012 to 2014. The Pay-as-you-earn (PAYE) system replaced SITE.

Individual income tax (otherwise known as Personal income tax) rates in South Africa range from 18% to 45% although the tax threshold of R78 150 (for persons below age 65) means that anyone earning less than this amount pays no income tax. Individuals earning less than R78 150 (2018) a year do not need to declare their income and do not need to submit an income tax return so long as their remuneration is from a single employer, their remuneration is for the full tax year and no allowance was paid, from which PAYE was not deducted in full with regards to travel allowance.

In 2017/18 there were a total of 21.0 million registered individual taxpayers. There were a total of 4.9 million assessed taxpayers in 2017/18 with total taxable income of R1.5 trillion. The assessed tax due was R321.4 billion. The Gauteng Province had 40.1% of assessed taxpayers and 27.3% of them employed in finance, insurance, real estate, or the business service sector. The age group 35 to 44 accounted for 27.2% of the assessed tax.

The 2020/21 tax year saw the following increases in the tax thresholds:

- R83 100 for people below the age of 65.
- R128 650 for people aged between 65 and 75.
- R143 850 for people aged 75 and above.

The 2020/21 tax year also saw the following increases in the tax rebates:

- R14 958 Primary Rebate
- R8 199 Secondary (Persons 65 and older)
- R2 736 Tertiary (Persons 75 and older)

In 2015/16 financial year out of a total 33 million eligible taxpayers around 10% or 3.3 million people paid 93% of total income tax collected in that period. Of them, 1.1 million or 3.7% of all income taxpayers paid just under 70% of all income tax collected in that period. This means that South African income tax receipts are highly reliant on a relatively small number of high income taxpayers.

In comparison, in the 2017/18 financial year the South African population was 56.7 million, of which 4.9 million people (8.6%) were taxpayers. Of these, 1.7 million or 39% of all income taxpayers paid just under 91% of all income tax collected in that period. This means that the tax burden is being spread amongst a larger group than the previous year, but that the tax base is still very small.

In the 2007/8 financial year there were 1219 individuals who earned in excess of R5 million per annum. In the 2017/18 financial year that number had not changed but their total income had dropped from R11.39 billion to R11.28 billion (a decrease of 0.9%) while the tax they paid (39.4% effective) increased by R21 million (an increase of 0.5%).

Taxable income by province in 2017/18
Province	Number of taxpayers	Taxable income (R billion)	Tax Assessed (R billion)
Eastern Cape	408 899	R 107	R 18
Free State	249 868	R 59	R 10
Gauteng	1 742 697	R 655	R 150
KwaZulu-Natal	674 362	R 193	R 36
Limpopo	260 430	R 71	R 12
Mpumalanga	283 462	R 81	R 15
Northern Cape	103 639	R 26	R 4
North West	236 314	R 61	R 11
Western Cape	773 927	R 773	R 53
Unknown province	164 967	R 164	R 8

Policy changes: In 2017/18 section 11F of the tax code set a R350 000 cap on the 27.5% deductible contribution to a pension fund. (See Tax on Pensions)

=== Inheritance tax / Estate duty ===
Inheritance tax is also referred to as Estate Duty and is a tax on Deceased Estates. Estate duty is similar to donations tax in that it is a tax on the transfer of wealth. The duty is charged on the death of a person and is based on the value of the deceased's estate at the date of their death.

There are three statutes governing inheritances in South Africa:

- The Administration of Estates Act, which regulates the disposal of the deceased's estate in South Africa;
- The Wills Act, which affects all testators with property in South Africa;
- The Intestate Succession Act, covering the estates for all deceased persons who have property in South Africa and who die without a will.

Inheritance tax applies to any person who owns property within South Africa. On death, all of a deceased person's assets are placed in a deceased estate. These assets may include both movable and immovable property. On finalisation of the administration of the deceased estate, the executor distributes the remaining assets to the beneficiaries. Beneficiaries are either legatees (who receive a specific asset) or heirs (who receive the balance after disposal to legatees).

Estate duty is intended to tax the transfer of wealth from the deceased estate to the beneficiaries. The tax is levied on the gross value of the assets (in excess of R3.5 million) of the deceased person at the time of death, less any allowable deductions. These deductions include bequests to public benefit organisations and property accruing to a surviving spouse.

The amount of tax levied on the estate can be affected by applicable tax rebates and recovery of tax from beneficiaries where applicable. If, for example, a financial instrument such as a life insurance policy which is part of the estate is payable directly to a beneficiary, the policy amount is not included in the gross value of the deceased estate and the beneficiary of the policy becomes liable for the estate duty on the policy.

Assets inherited are deemed a capital receipt and are not included in the taxpayers gross income. Capital Gains Tax (CGT) is not payable on receipt of an inheritance though it is generally payable by the deceased estate.

On 21 February 2018 Estate Duty was set at 20% for estates of up to R30 million and 25% on the excess.

Any income received by the deceased estate from the time it comes into existence until the distribution of the assets to the beneficiaries is dealt with under Section 25 of the Income Tax Act.

Donations from within an estate are treated as normal donations (see Donations tax) and taxed as such.

The South African government has agreements with some countries to avoid double taxation in relation to estate duty.

=== Interest taxation ===
Tax on interest is a broad category of tax covering any interest earned by a taxpayer. Interest earned by a resident of South Africa is treated as part of the taxpayer's total taxable income (and is taxed at their marginal rate), with the following exemptions:

- For persons younger than 65, R23 800 of interest earned per annum is exempt from taxation; and
- For persons 65 years or older, R34 500 of interest earned per annum is exempt from taxation.

No change was made to interest taxation in the 2020/21 Budget.

As from 1 March 2015, interest earned by or paid to or for the benefit of any non-resident of South Africa was subject to Withholding Tax on Interest at a flat rate of 15%. This was amended in the 2018/19 Budget to exempt non-residents who were out of the country for at least 181 days from income tax. Interest earned by non-residents is exempt from taxation if it is payable by any sphere of the South African government or a bank or if the debt is listed on a recognised exchange. (See also Withholding tax)

In the 2020/21 budget the interest earned by any non-resident of South Africa, who is absent for 183 days, and if the interest bearing debt is not "effectively connected" to a South African business is exempt from income tax.

From 1 March 2012 the exemption applicable to foreign interest earned by South African resident taxpayers was scrapped.

=== Lump-sum pre-retirement tax ===
This tax came into effect in 2009. The tax is on the cumulative amount withdrawn from a retirement fund within any tax year prior to retirement. The annual exemption has been R25,000 since the 2015/16 tax year. The 2020/21 tax year saw no change to this tax.

Taxation of pre-retirement lump sums
Taxable income (annual)	Rate of Tax
0 – R25 000	0%
R25 001 – R660 000	18% of the amount above R25 000
R660 001 – R990 000	R114 300 + 27% of the amount above R660 000
R990 001 and above	R203 400 + 36% of the amount above R990 000

=== Lump-sums upon retirement tax ===
On retirement a taxpayer may take up to the lesser of 1/3 of their retirement annuity fund or R500,000 as a tax free lump sum. In the case where the taxpayer has already made a withdrawal from the retirement annuity (not possible before age 55) that amount is deemed to be part of the tax free lump sum.

In addition, the taxpayer may only take a maximum of 1/3 of their retirement annuity fund value as a lump sum upon retirement and the remaining 2/3 must purchase an annuity.

Divorce settlement payments made by retirement funds are taxable in the hands of the non-member spouse. The 2020/21 budget saw no changes to this tax. The definition of retirement was expanded to include "termination of employment due [to] attaining the age of 55 years, sickness, accident, injury, incapacity, redundancy or termination of the employer's trade."

Taxation of retirement lump sums or severance benefits
Lump Sum Amount	Rate of Tax
0 – R500 000	0%
R500 001 – R700 000	18% of the amount above R500 000
R700 001 – R1 050 000	R36 000 + 27% of the amount above R700 000
R1 050 001 and above	R130 500 + 36% of the amount above R1 050 000

=== Mining lease and ownership Taxes ===
Taxes on mining leases and ownership are calculated at different rates for the various mining activities.

=== Mining royalties ===
Royalties are paid to the owner of the land on which mining is taking place, which in a few cases is the government. The royalties used to be negotiated and were usually in the 1-3% range. In the 2020/21 Budget Royalties taxes are imposed at 15% on the gross amount of royalties payable to non-residents.

=== Municipal rates ===
On 2 July 2005, the Municipal Property Rates Act No 6 of 2004 was implemented. Municipalities determine both the value of the property (through assessments which must take place every four to five years) and the rate at which it is taxed (which is published in Rates Tariff Sheets). Each municipality may determine its own rates and exclusion criteria, which it sets in rates bylaws.

=== Provisional tax ===
Provisional tax is an estimation of total taxable income for the year. A provisional taxpayer cannot be a deceased estate and is any person who either:

- earns remuneration from an unregistered employer; or
- earns income that is not remuneration, an allowance or an advance payment. Income derived from equity dividends is an example.

If a taxpayer meets the above criteria but does not carry on any business and, either:

- the individuals taxable income will not exceed the tax threshold for the tax year; or
- the individual's income from interest, dividends, rental and remuneration is less than R30 000 for the tax year

then the taxpayer is not required to pay provisional tax.

=== Property disposal by non-residents ===
Non-resident sellers of immovable property are subject to a provisional tax that is set off against their tax liability as non-residents. The following rates apply:

- Non-resident individuals 7.5%
- Non-resident companies 10%
- Non-resident trusts 15%

=== Retrenchment packages tax ===
A retrenchment package is severance pay that is required to be at least one week's remuneration per completed year of service. Remuneration is calculated including basic salary and payments in kind. Outstanding leave must be paid out in full. The entire value of the retrenchment package, less an exemption amount, is included in the taxpayer's taxable income for the financial year.

Prior to 1 March 2011 the exemption amount was R30,000. This figure was merged with the retirement lump sum tax exemption. This negated the possibility of a taxpayer, who was retrenched and retired within the same year, claiming two tax free lump sum exemptions.

=== Retirement funds income tax ===
This tax was abolished in March 2007.

=== Securities Transfer Tax ===
A security is defined as a share (depository) within a company or a member's interest in a close corporation (CC). As from 1 April 2012, the "right or entitlement to receive any distribution from a company or close corporation" is no longer deemed to be a security and is covered by dividends tax. Securities Transfer Tax (STT) was implemented from 1 July 2008 under the Securities Transfer Tax Act (2007) and Securities Transfer Tax Administration Act (2007). Simplistically, it is a tax of 0.25% on every transfer of a security.

However, certain transactions such as "shorting" a share involve a usage of collateral instead of the actual security. When there is a transfer of collateral during a securities lending transaction, both income tax and securities transfer tax apply owing to the actual transfer of beneficial ownership. This tax was not changed in the 2020/21 budget.

STT applies to a transfer of any security issued for a company or CC incorporated, established or formed in South Africa, as well as any other company listed on an exchange in South Africa. STT also applies to unlisted securities.

Before 2007 this tax was composed of two parts: Marketable Securities Tax and Uncertified Securities Tax.

=== Sin Taxes ===
Sin taxes are taxes on the consumption of alcoholic beverages and tobacco products. These include: malt beer, unfortified wine, fortified wine, sparkling wine, ciders, spirits, cigarettes, cigarette tobacco, pipe tobacco and cigars. The tax rates are obtainable from the SARS website.

=== Skills development levy ===
Skills Development Levy (SDL) is a tax intended to develop employee skills through training. The tax is levied at 1% of the total salary paid to an employee, which includes any lump sum payments, bonuses, overtime payments, payment in lieu of leave, and commissions. The tax is paid by the employer to SARS on a monthly basis as part of the monthly employer declaration (EMP201).

The employer deducts or withholds the amount of tax from its employees. The employer is able to claim a portion of this tax back in compensation for approved training undertaken by the employees that was paid for by the employer. The funds are distributed via the various Sector Educational and Training Authorities (SETA).

Employers whose salary bill in the last 12 months has exceeded R500 000, or whose expected salary bill for the next 12 months exceeds R500 000 are liable to pay SDL. Such employers are required to register for SDL but the following employers are exempt from paying SDL:

- Public service employers from within the national or provincial sphere of government are expected to budget for training equivalent to that which they would be liable for under SDL and as such they are exempt from paying the tax.
- If 80% or more of the expenditure of a national or provincial public entity is paid directly or indirectly from funds approved by parliament then such entities are exempt from paying SDL. As with the previous case, these entities are expected to budget for training equivalent to that which they would be liable for under SDL.
- Organisations which either 1) only perform certain welfare, humanitarian, health care, religious or similar public benefit activities and are classified as public benefit organisations (PBO) under the Income Tax Act; or 2) provide funds only to a PBO and have a letter of exemption from a Tax Exemption Unit (TEU) of SARS.
- Any municipality which has been issued with a certificate of exemption from the Minister of Labour.
- Any employer whose total salary bill over the next 12 months does not exceed R500 000, even if they had previously paid SDL.

=== Stamp Duty ===
A duty was imposed on a range of documents and transactions. However, it was abolished on 1 April 2009 when the Stamp Duties Act 77 of 1968 was repealed. Nonetheless, such duties are payable on lease agreements signed before 1 April 2009 that were not stamped at the time.

=== Standard income tax on employees (SITE) ===
This tax was introduced in March 1988 to limit the number of income tax returns filed annually. It was repealed in 2011 and abolished in 2013.

=== Transfer duty ===
Transfer Duty is a tax levied on the value of any property (defined as land and fixtures including mineral rights and shares in a share-block company) acquired by any person by way of a transaction or in any other way. All property Conveyancers are requested to register with SARS. The tax is paid by the person acquiring the property or the person who benefits from a renunciation. The government uses property transfers to ensure tax compliance across all taxes, i.e. properties will not be transferred to non-compliant persons.

Transfer Duty Rates
Value of Property	Tax Rate
R0 – R1 000 000	0%
R1 000 001 – R1 375 000	3% of the value above R1 000 000
R1 375 001 – R1 925 000	R11 250 + 6% of the value above R 1 375 000
R1 925 001 – R2 475 000	R44 250 + 8% of the value above R 1 925 000
R2 475 001 – R11 000 000	R88 250 + 11% of the value above R2 475 000
R11 000 001 and above	R1 026 000 + 13% of the value above R11 000 000

Duty is payable within six months from the date of acquisition and thereafter is subject to interest at 10% per annum calculated on a monthly basis. The six-month period is calculated from the date on which the contract is signed, not the date on which the contract becomes binding.

=== Turnover tax ===
The intention of turnover tax is to make tax compliance and payment for micro businesses easier by reducing the amount of paperwork. Turnover tax replaces Income Tax, VAT, Provisional Tax, Capital Gains Tax and Dividends Tax for micro businesses with an annual turnover of R 1 million or less. Businesses that pay turnover tax may still elect to stay with the VAT system. The tax is based on the turnover (gross income) of the company. Turnover tax remained unchanged in the 2020/21 budget.

Turnover Tax
Turnover	Tax Rate
R0 – R335 000	0%
R335 001 – R500 000	1% of the value above R350 000
R500 001 – R750 000	R1 650 + 2% of the value above R500 000
R750 001 and above	R6 650 + 3% of the value above R750 000

Turnover tax is paid in three payments to SARS, the first in August, the second in February and the third after final submission of the Turnover tax return.

It's not a entity but a tax system for Small and Medium Enterprises.

=== Unemployment insurance ===
The Unemployment Insurance Fund (UIF) was created to provide short-term financial assistance to people who become unemployed or are unable to work owing to maternity, adoption leave or illness. The dependants of a deceased person who contributed to the UIF may also be entitled to some financial relief. The UIF system is governed by the Unemployment Insurance Act (2001) and the Unemployment Insurance Contributions act (2002). The system came into operation on 1 April 2002.

Contributions to the UIF are from all employees and their employers who are registered for employee's tax, with the exception of:

- Employees employed for less than 24 hours a month;
- Employees employed under contract in terms of the Skills Development act 1998, Section 18(2);
- National or provincial government employees;
- Expatriate employees who will return home on completion of their term of service/employment;
- National and provincial ministers and premiers, including the President and Deputy President.
- A member of a municipal or traditional council or traditional leader, such as the King of the Zulus.

The amount contributed under this tax is 2% of the remuneration paid to the employee, with a remuneration ceiling of R14 872 per month (as from 1 October 2012). The employee contributes 1% and the employer contributes the remaining 1%. The tax is paid on a monthly basis as part of the monthly employer declaration (EMP201).

=== Value Added Tax (VAT) ===
Value Added Tax (VAT) is a broad tax made by vendors on the supply of goods and services that is charged upon purchase. VAT must be paid irrespective of whether or not it is a capital good or trading stock so long as the vendor uses the goods in his/her enterprise. It's compulsory for a business to register VAT remission when the value of taxable supplies in a 12-month period exceeds or is expected to exceed R1 million. VAT in South Africa currently stands at 15% as of 1 April 2018.

Value Added Tax (VAT) was first introduced in South Africa on 29 September 1991 at a rate of 10%. In 1993 VAT was raised to 14% and to 15% at the national budget speech in February 2018. If the given price on an item charged by a vendor does not mention VAT then that price is deemed to include VAT.

In 2017/18 fiscal year about 56% of the 773 783 registered VAT vendors were active and 35.5% of VAT vendors had a turnover of less than R1 million. People who are not South African passport holders and are not resident in South Africa are eligible to claim back VAT on movable goods purchased in the country provided they present a tax invoice (such as a receipt) for those goods.

When goods are imported ad valorem taxes are imposed on the cost of the goods. VAT is then applied to the total of the cost of the item and the ad valorem tax.

Certain goods and services are Zero-rated, including exports, basic food items, petrol and diesel, and farming inputs. The zero-rating of these goods and services is subject to annual review.

Certain categories of goods and services are exempt from VAT, including educational services and public transport. It is unlikely that these categories will be reviewed.

=== Withholding tax ===
Withholding tax, also called retention tax, is broadly applicable to two categories:

1) It is a government requirement for a South African payer of an item of income to a non-resident in South Africa to withhold or deduct tax from the payment, and pay that tax to the government. There are two categories of this tax:

- As from 1 January 2015 a withholding tax on royalties of 15% is imposed, unless double taxation agreements apply.
- A withholding tax on payments for fixed property which applies to any person who must pay a non-resident for immovable property in South Africa. This tax ranges between 5% and 10%.

2) It is a government requirement for a South African payer of an item of income to a resident or non-resident in South Africa to withhold or deduct tax from the payment, and pay that tax to the government. Instances of this tax include:

- A withholding tax on dividends of 20%. As of 1 April 2012, this replaced the secondary tax on companies (STC) since STC had created the impression that it was a further tax on companies. Dividend tax is a tax on individuals and non-resident shareholders.

Dividends paid by REITs are considered income in the hands of the recipient of the dividend and are thus included in the total taxable income of the taxpayer and hence taxed at the taxpayer's marginal rate.

The 2018/19 Budget amends this tax such that if a non-resident is out of South Africa for at least 181 days in a 12-month period they are not subject to income tax.

== Tax deductions ==
=== Allowances ===
==== Subsistence allowances ====
If a taxpayer is obliged to spend at least one night away from his usual residence on business then the following can be claimed:

1. Within the Republic of South Africa
- Incidental costs only, R139 per day
- Meals and incidental costs, R452 per day
2. Outside the republic of South Africa, specific amounts per country are deemed to have been expended. The details of these rates are available on the SARS website.

==== Travelling allowance ====
Where actual costs are not claimed, a rate per kilometre travelled for business travel claimed against an allowance or advance is used to determine the allowable deduction. The actual distance travelled by the vehicle for business purposes, as recorded in a log book is used to determine the costs which may be claimed. This rate is available on the SARS website.

If the employer provides an allowance or advance based on the actual distance travelled by the taxpayer for business purposes, then no tax is payable on the allowance paid by the employer, up to a rate published on the SARS website. If the taxpayer receives any other allowance or reimbursement related to the vehicle (excluding parking and toll fees) then this exception is not applied.

If the taxpayer uses the vehicle at least 80% of the time for business purposes then 20% of the travelling allowance is included in the taxpayer's remuneration for calculation of PAYE. If this is not the case, 80% of the travelling allowance is included in the taxpayer's remuneration for calculation of PAYE.

Fuel costs may be claimed if the taxpayer has borne the full cost of the fuel used in the vehicle. Maintenance costs may be claimed if the taxpayer has borne the full costs of the maintenance of the vehicle. If the vehicle is covered by a maintenance plan the taxpayer may not claim the maintenance costs.

=== Donations ===
Deductions for donations to certain public benefit organisations is limited to 10% of the individual's taxable income (excluding retirement fund lump sums and severance benefits). Donations exceeding this amount are carried into the following tax year.

=== Medical and disability expenses ===
Individuals are allowed to deduct:

1. A Medical Tax Credit, defined as a monthly contributions to medical schemes by the individual who paid the contribution of up to
- R319 for each of the first two people covered by the scheme, and
- R215 for each additional dependant
2. If an individual is:
- 65 years of age or older, or
- has a spouse or child that is disabled
then that individual may deduct
- 33.3% of qualifying medical expenses borne by the individual, and
- the difference between 3x the medical tax credit and the individual's contributions to the medical scheme
3. Any other individual may deduct:
- 25% of qualifying medical expenses borne by the individual, and
- the difference between 4x the medical tax credit and the individual's contributions to the medical scheme, limited to the amount which exceeds 7.5% of the individual taxable income (excluding retirement fund lump sums and severance benefits)

=== Retirement fund contributions ===
Contributions by South African tax residents to pension, provident and retirement annuity funds are deductible by members of those funds (i.e. contributions made to funds on behalf of a third party are not deductible by the first party). The deduction is limited to the greater of 27.5% of either:

- the remuneration for PAYE purposes, or
- taxable income of the taxpayer

excluding

- retirement fund lumps sums, and
- severance benefits

The deduction is further limited to the lower of R350 000 or 27.5% of taxable income before the inclusion of capital gains contributions. Contributions exceeding this amount are carried forward to subsequent tax years and "offset against the retirement fund lump sums and retirement annuities."

== Centenary of income tax ==
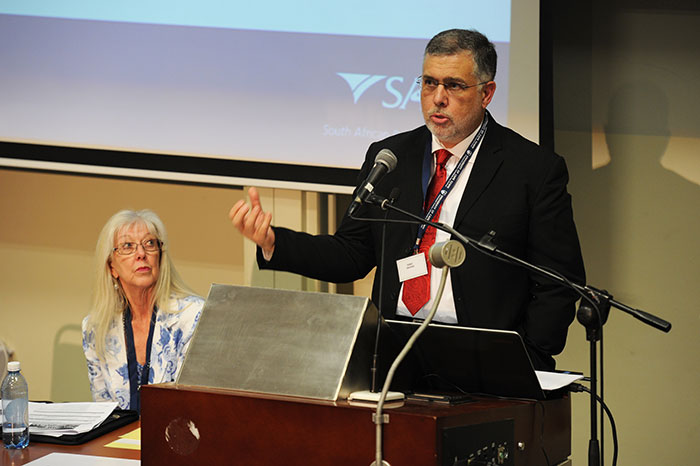
University of Cape Town, 17 November 2014: Dr Beric John Croome (right) addresses attendees at the "Income Tax in South Africa: The First 100 Years" conference, with Professor Jennifer Roeleveld, Head: Taxation, Department of Finance and Tax, UCT and a conference organiser, looking on. (Photograph by Michael Hammond/University of Cape Town)

During 1914, General Jan Smuts, in his capacity as Minister of Finance, tabled legislation in the Parliament of the Union of South Africa, introducing income tax in the country, with the Income Tax Act of 1914.

Taxpayers in the Union of South Africa became liable to pay income tax, with effect from 20 July 1914. In 2014, it had been 20 years since South Africa became a full democracy. The University of Cape Town marked the 20-year milestone of the introduction of income tax in South Africa, with the "Income Tax In South Africa: The First 100 Years, 1914 – 2014" conference and later, a publication of the papers presented during the event.

== See also ==
- Property tax in South Africa
