= Drive-through (disambiguation) =

Drive-through is a service that motorists can use from their vehicle (without parking).

Drive-through or Drive-thru may also refer to:

- Drive-through (auto racing), an auto-racing penalty
- Drive-Thru Records, a record label
- Drive-Thru (film), 2007 film
- "Drive-Thru", a song by Tenacious D from their album Tenacious D
- "Drive Thru", an episode from SpongeBob SquarePants season 8
