= Automobile Association of South Africa =

The Automobile Association of South Africa
- Type: Non-profit
- Industry: Automotive
- Founded: 1930; 96 years ago
- Headquarters: Kyalami, Gauteng, South Africa
- Services: Lobbying for improved vehicle safety regulations Roadside assistance Legal and technical advice insurance Vehicle inspection and repairs
- Website: aa.co.za

The Automobile Association of South Africa (AASA), often abbreviated as AA, is a non-profit automobile association in South Africa. Headquartered in Gauteng, the AA was established in SA in 1930. The association advocates on behalf of South African drivers, and provides a variety of auto-related services to its members.

== Operations ==
=== Vehicle safety standards ===
Importantly, the AA maintains liaison with South African Government departments, such as the Department of Transport, to influence decisions, either by lobbying or making formal representations on behalf of motorists.

One major way this is accomplished is through the Safer Cars for Africa advocacy campaign, which is a partnership between the AA and Global NCAP that has existed since 2017. The goal is lobbying for improved passenger vehicle safety standards. The campaign is supported by the FIA Foundation and Bloomberg Philanthropies.

These efforts have led to some manufacturers introducing safer versions of poorly-rated cars.

=== Member services ===
The AA provides services to its members including:

- Roadside assistance
- Coordinating with emergency services
- Insurance
- Technical and automotive-related legal advice
- Passenger vehicle inspection and repair at AA centers

The AA also issues international driving licenses to travelers, regardless of whether they are a member.

== Sponsorships ==
The AASA is an official sponsor of the Cape Town Cycle Tour.

== See also ==
- The Automobile Association
