= Department of Transport (South Africa) =

South African government department

- List: 10 other official names: Departement van Vervoer (Afrikaans); umNyango wezokuThutha (Southern Ndebele); iSebe lezoThutho (Xhosa); uMnyango Wezokuthutha (Zulu); Litiko Letekutfutsa (Swazi); Kgoro ya Dinamelwa (Northern Sotho); Lefapha la Dipalangwang (Sotho); Lefapha la Dipalangwa (Tswana); Ndzawulo ya Vutleketli (Tsonga); Muhasho wa Vhuendi (Venda)

Department overview
- Jurisdiction: Government of South Africa
- Headquarters: Forum Building, 159 Struben Street, Pretoria, Gauteng, South Africa; 25°44′33″S 28°11′10″E
- Employees: 706 (2025)
- Annual budget: R79.5 billion (2023/24)
- Minister responsible: Barbara Creecy, Minister of Transport
- Deputy Minister responsible: Mkhuleko Hlengwa, Deputy Minister of Transport
- Department executive: James Mlawu, Director-General: Transport
- Website: transport.gov.za

The Department of Transport is the department of the South African government concerned with transport. The political head of the department is the Minister of Transport, currently Barbara Creecy; her deputy is Mkhuleko Hlengwa.

Responsibility for transport is constitutionally between the national transport department and the nine provincial transport departments.

The national department has exclusive responsibility for national and international airports, national roads, railways, and marine transport; the national and provincial departments share responsibility for other airports, public transport, road traffic regulation, and vehicle licensing; and the provincial departments have exclusive responsibility for provincial and local roads, traffic and parking.

The department had a budget of 79.5 billion rand for the 2023/2024 financial year, with transfers and subsidies to entities within the department accounting for about 98%. Prasa, the struggling state rail agency, will receive more than a quarter (R20.5-billion) of the budget.

== Structure ==
The Department of Transport is divided into six branches:

- Administration
- Integrated Transport Planning
- Rail Transport
- Civil Aviation
- Maritime Transport
- Public Transport

The department is also responsible for several semi-independent agencies and state-owned companies:

- Passenger Rail Agency of South Africa
- South African National Roads Agency
- Road Traffic Management Corporation
- South African Maritime Safety Authority
- South African Civil Aviation Authority
- Cross Border Road Transport Agency
- Road Accident Fund
- Railway Safety Regulator
- Ports Regulator
- Air Traffic and Navigation Services Company
- Airports Company of South Africa
- Road Traffic Infringement Agency

== See also ==
Provincial transport departments:

- Gauteng Department of Roads and Transport
- Western Cape Department of Transport and Public Works
