= Road Traffic Management Corporation =

Road safety agency in South Africa

Transport (road safety) overview
- Formed: 2005; 20 years ago
- Jurisdiction: South Africa (national)
- Headquarters: Centurion, South Africa
- Motto: “Leading South Africa to Safe Roads”
- Transport (road safety) executive: Nomusa Mufamadi (Chairperson)
- Parent Transport (road safety): Department of Transport
- Key document: Road Traffic Management Corporation Act, No. 20 of 1999
- Website: rtmc.co.za

The Road Traffic Management Corporation (RTMC) is the government agency tasked with overseeing road safety in South Africa. It is one of the agencies managed by the Department of Transport, which is headed by the Transport Minister.

South Africa has a vast, developed road network (the most developed in Africa), and the RTMC works alongside other transport agencies to ensure its continued functionality and ability to adequately serve the country's residents.

The RTMC is a member of the United Nations Road Safety Collaboration, an informal consultative mechanism of the United Nations, whose members are committed to road safety efforts.

== History ==
The RTMC was established in terms of Section 3 of the Road Traffic Management Corporation Act, No. 20 of 1999.

The agency commenced operations in April 2005, with the objective of collating powers and resources, so as to eliminate the fragmentation of responsibilities for road traffic management across various levels of government in South Africa.

The RTMC announced in 2011 that it had established a new national traffic police unit, and had appointed David Sony Tembe, a member of the Joburg Metro Police, as the new Chief of National Traffic Police.

In October 2021, the RTMC launched its online National Traffic Information System (eNatis) platform for vehicle license matters, which is used in all provinces except the Western Cape, which has its own system.

In 2025, the Minister of Transport, Barbara Creecy, announced plans to enhance South African road safety policies and make them more effective. She said that the Department of Transport (DoT), in collaboration with the RTMC, aimed to implement a "Safe System Approach" which would be a comprehensive system of assessing and implementing safer vehicle technologies, how roads are designed and constructed, and improvements in traffic management.

In June 2025, the RTMC announced that it had had over 4 million vehicle license renewals to date, via its eNatis platform, which the RTMC said saved time by reducing queues at licensing centers.

Also in June 2025, it was reported that the RTMC had collaborated with the Department of Basic Education and the National Education Collaboration Trust to integrate road safety education into the South African education curriculum.

In July 2025, the RTMC placed its CEO, Advocate Makhosini Msibi, on precautionary suspension for a period of 30 days, amid allegations of financial misconduct. A forensic investigation was to be conducted.

Msibi subsequently approached the Pretoria High Court with an application to overturn his suspension, stating that it was invalid, and that the RTMC lacked the statutory power to suspend him. Msibi also stated that a suspension should come from the Shareholders' Committee, which includes the Minister of Transport. He further said the Committee was not in place.

== Mandate ==
The RTMC has numerous functional areas, which are as follows:

- Law enforcement
  - Road traffic law enforcement (shared mandate)
  - Administrative adjudication of road traffic offences
- Road safety
  - Communication and education
  - Infrastructure safety audits
- Capacity development
  - Traffic personnel training
- Data management
  - Accident recording and investigations
  - Road traffic information

A few related functional areas have not been transferred to the RTMC, and are therefore managed directly by other entities. These are:

- Vehicle and roadworthiness testing
- Vehicle registration and licensing (managed by local government, such as municipalities)
- Testing and licensing of drivers

== Corporate social responsibility ==
The RTMC has stated that it has a focus on sustainably impacting and bringing a positive transformation to the lives of South Africans. Its CSR initiatives have included hosting a National School Nutrition project, a Nelson Mandela Day community garden project, a National Feminine Care project, and a School Readiness Project.

== See also ==
- Roads in South Africa
- National routes in South Africa
- Department of Transport (South Africa)
- Transport in South Africa
