= Economy of South Africa =

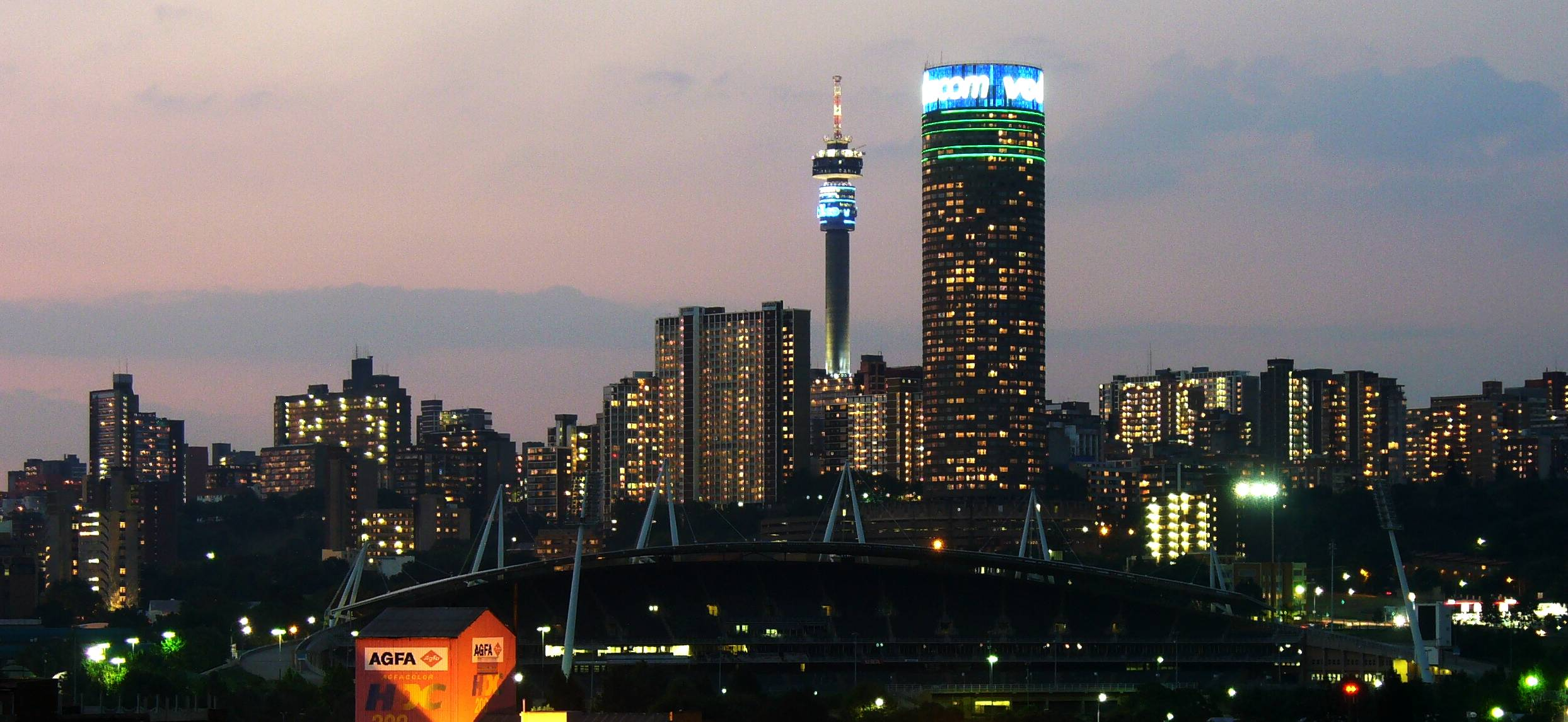
- Johannesburg, the financial centre of South Africa
- Currency: South African rand (ZAR, R)
- Fiscal year: 1 April – 31 March (government); 1 March – 28/29 February (corporate & private)
- Trade organisations: AU, WTO, WHO, BRICS, G-20, IBSA, SADC, G8+5, IMF, AfCFTA, SACU and others
- Country group: Developing country; Upper-middle income economy; Newly industrialised country

Statistics
- Population: ▲63.86 million (2026, Q3 est)
- GDP: ▲$489.08 billion (nominal,Q3 2026 est.); ▲$1.08 trillion (PPP, Q3 2026 est)
- GDP rank: 38th (nominal, Q3 2026); 34rd (PPP, Q3 2026)
- GDP growth: 1.3% (2025)
- GDP per capita: ▲$7,660 (Q3 2026 est); ▲$16,840 (PPP, Q3 2026 est)
- GDP per capita rank: 107th (nominal, Q1 2025); 107th (PPP, Q1 2025)
- GDP per capita growth: -0.7% (2024)
- GDP by sector: Agriculture: 2.6%; Industry: 24.6%; Services: 62.6%; (2023 est.)
- Inflation (CPI): ▲4.5% (2026, Q3)
- Population below national poverty line: ▼12.75% on less than $3/ day (2026 est)
- Gini coefficient: ▼63 very high (2023)
- Human Development Index: ▲0.741 high (2023) (106th); ▲0.476 low IHDI (2023, 119th rank)
- Corruption Perceptions Index: ▼41 out of 100 points (2025, 82nd)
- Labour force: ▲25.2 million (Q2, 2025 est)
- Labour force by occupation: Agriculture: 19.26%; Industry: 18.08%; Services: 62.66%; (2022)
- Unemployment: ▼31.9% unemployment rate (Q3 2025)
- Youth unemployment: ▼59.9% (2025)
- Average gross salary: ▲ R29,490 / US$1,788 monthly (2025)
- Average net salary: ▲ R21,414 / US$1,299 monthly (2025)
- Gross capital formation: ▼14% of GDP (2024)
- Main industries: Mining (world's largest producer of platinum group metals, gold, chromium), automobile manufacturing, metalworking, technology, machinery, textiles, iron and steel, IT, chemicals, fertiliser, foodstuffs, manufacturing, commercial ship repair

External
- Exports: ▲$151 billion (2024)
- Export goods: Gold, diamonds, wines, iron ore, platinum, nonferrous metals, electronics, machinery and manufactured equipment, motor vehicles, fruits, various agricultural foodstuffs, ground and air military hardware
- Main export partners: China 17%; United States 8.22%; India 8.19%; United Kingdom 8.05%; Germany 5.58%; (2024)
- Imports: ▲$101 billion (2024)
- Import goods: Machinery and equipment, chemicals, petroleum products, scientific instruments, foodstuffs, cars, gold
- Main import partners: China 21.6%; India 7.31%; Germany 6.91%; United States 5.81%; United Arab Emirates 2.94%; (2024)
- FDI stock: ▲$156.8 billion (31 December 2017 est.); ▲ Abroad: $270.3 billion (31 December 2017 est.)
- Current account: ▲ −$4.32 billion (Q1, 2026 est)
- Gross external debt: ▼$163.9 billion (June 2024 est.)

Public finance
- Government debt: ▲78.9% of GDP (2026, April est.)
- Foreign reserves: ▲$75.892 billion (Dec 2025)
- Budget balance: −5.1% (of GDP) (2025 est.)
- Revenue: $126.95 billion (2025 est.)
- Spending: $148.82 billion (2025 est.)
- Credit rating: S&P Global Ratings: BB; Outlook: Positive; Moody's: Ba2; Outlook: Stable; Fitch: BB-; Outlook: Stable; Scope Ratings: BB; Outlook: Stable
- All values, unless otherwise stated, are in US dollars.

South Africa has a developing economy considered upper-middle income. It has the largest economy in Africa as of 2026. It is also the continent's most industrialised, diversified and technologically advanced economy. South Africa is a leading middle power in international relations. Johannesburg is South Africa’s primary economic and financial centre, contributing about 16% of the country's gross domestic product and roughly 40% of Gauteng’s total economic output.

Cape Town, the nation's second-largest city by population, serves as Africa's tech hub, has a large startup community, and is popular among digital nomads. The city is home to hundreds of tech firms, and is referred to as the "Startup Capital of Africa". Although the natural resource extraction industry remains one of the largest in the country with an annual contribution to the GDP of US$13.5 billion, the economy of South Africa has diversified since the end of apartheid, particularly towards services. In 2019, the financial industry contributed US$41.4 billion to South Africa's GDP.

In 2021, South Africa-based financial institutions managed more than US$1.41 trillion in assets. The total market capitalisation of the Johannesburg Stock Exchange is US$1.28 trillion as of October 2021. South Africa's banking sector was rated as a strongly positive feature of the country's economy. The nation is among the G20, and is the only African country that is a permanent member of the group. In 2020, South Africa's metropolitan areas (metros), such as Cape Town, Durban, and Johannesburg, accounted for 57% of the country's total economic activity.

== History ==
The formal economy of South Africa has its beginnings in the arrival of Dutch settlers in 1652, originally sent by the Dutch East India Company to establish a provisioning station for passing ships. As the colony increased in size, with the arrival of Huguenots and German colonists, some of the colonists were set free to pursue commercial farming, leading to the dominance of agriculture in the economy.

At the end of the 18th century, the British annexed the colony. This led to the Great Trek, spreading farming deeper into the mainland, as well as the establishment of the independent Afrikaner Republics of the Transvaal and the Orange Free State.

In the 1870s, diamonds were discovered in Kimberley, while in 1886, some of the world's largest gold deposits were discovered in the Witwatersrand region of Transvaal, quickly transforming the economy into a resource-dominated one. The British annexed the area as a result of the Second Boer War which saw the deployment of scorched earth tactics against Boer non-combatants. South Africa also entered a period of industrialisation during this time, including the organisation of the first South African trade unions.

The Great Depression in South Africa had a pronounced economic and political effect on the country, as it did on most nations at the time. As world trade slumped, demand for South African agricultural and mineral exports fell drastically.

The country soon started putting laws distinguishing between different races in place in 1948 when the National Party won the national elections, and immediately started implementing an even stricter race-based policy named Apartheid, in an attempt to shelter the original white society from a never-ending increase in the black population. The policy was widely criticised and led to crippling sanctions being placed against the country in the 1980s.

South Africa held its first non-racial elections in 1994, leaving the newly all-African elected African National Congress (ANC) government the daunting task of trying to restore order to an economy harmed by sanctions, while also integrating the previously disadvantaged segment of the population into it.

The government refrained from resorting to economic populism. Inflation was brought down, public finances were stabilised, and some foreign capital was attracted. However, growth was still subpar. At the start of 2000, then President Thabo Mbeki vowed to promote economic growth and foreign investment by relaxing restrictive labour laws, stepping up the pace of privatisation, raising governmental spending and cutting interest rates sharply from 1998 levels. His policies faced strong opposition from organised labour. From 2004 onward economic growth picked up significantly; both employment and capital formation increased.

In April 2009, amid fears that South Africa would soon join much of the rest of the world in the late-2000s recession, Reserve Bank Governor Tito Mboweni and Minister of Finance Trevor Manuel differed on the matter: whereas Manuel foresaw a quarter of economic growth, Mboweni predicted further decline: "technically," he said, "that's a recession." In 2009 the Nobel-Prize-winning economist Joseph Stiglitz warned South Africa that inflation targeting should be a secondary concern amid the 2008 financial crisis.

South Africa, unlike other emerging markets, has struggled through the late 2000s recession, and the recovery has been largely led by private and public consumption growth, while export volumes and private investment have yet to fully recover. The long-term potential growth rate of South Africa under the current policy environment has been estimated at 3.5%. Per capita GDP growth has proved mediocre, though improving, growing by 1.6% a year from 1994 to 2009, and by 2.2% over the 2000–09 decade, compared to world growth of 3.1% over the same period.

The high levels of unemployment, at over 25%, and inequality are considered by the government and most South Africans to be the most salient economic problems facing the country. These issues, and others linked to them such as crime, have in turn hurt investment and growth, consequently having a negative feedback effect on employment. Crime is considered a major or very severe constraint on investment by 30% of enterprises in South Africa, putting crime among the four most frequently mentioned constraints.

In April 2017, political tensions in the country arose over the sacking of nine cabinet members including Minister of Finance Pravin Gordhan by the president Jacob Zuma. The finance minister was seen as central to efforts to restore confidence in South Africa. As a result of the tensions, S&P Global cut South Africa's credit rating to junk status on Monday 3 April 2017. Fitch Ratings followed suit on Friday 7 April 2017 and cut the country's credit status to the sub-investment grade of BBB−. The South African rand lost more than 11% in the week following the cabinet reshuffling.

=== Historical statistics 1980–2022 ===
Development of real GDP per capita in countries in Southern Africa

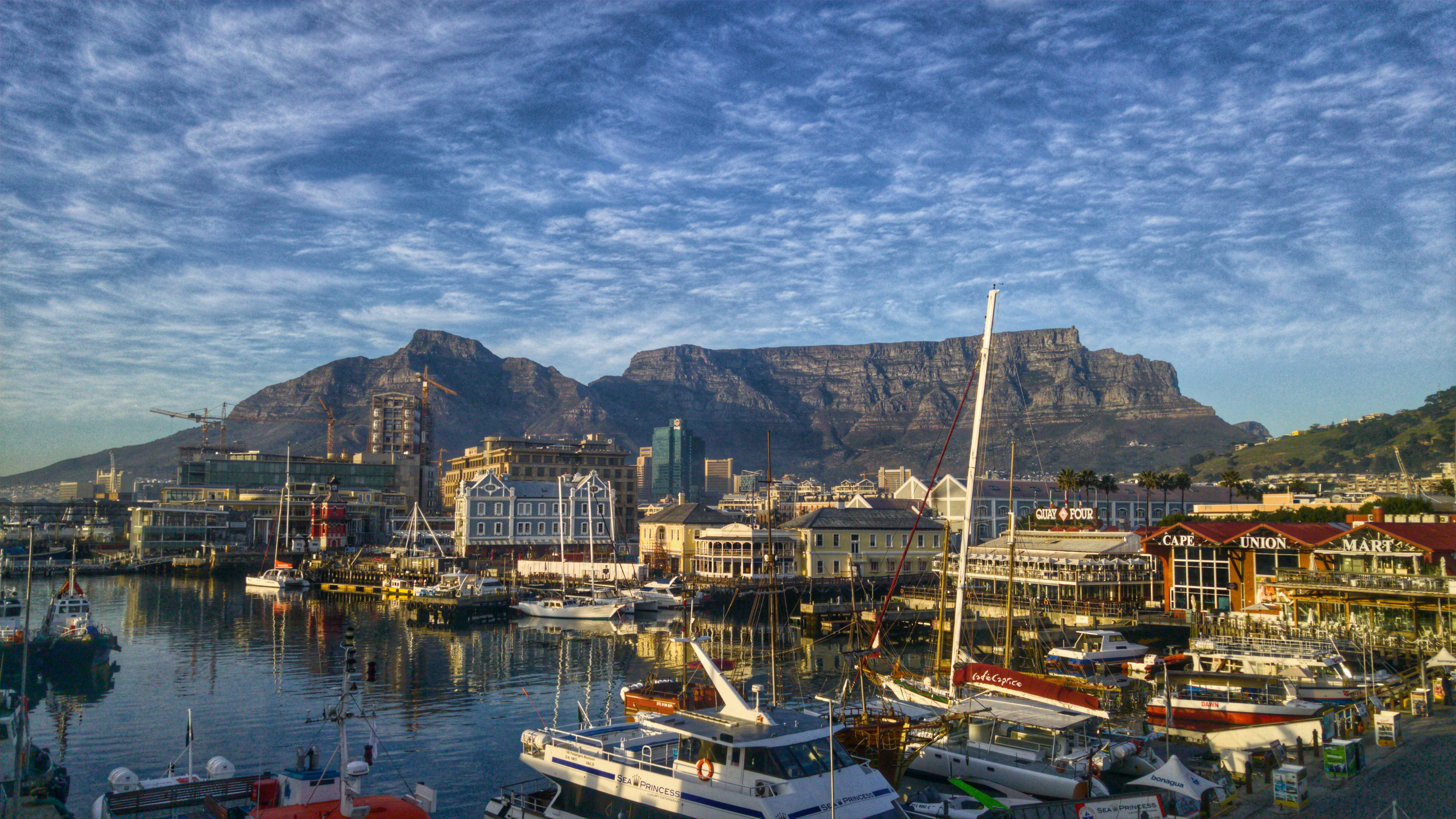
Cape Town CBD, viewed from the V&A Waterfront. The city is considered Africa's tech hub.

The following table shows the main economic indicators in 1980–2022. Inflation under 5% is in green.

Year	GDP (in bn. US$ PPP)	GDP per capita (in US$PPP)	GDP (in billion US$ nominal)	GDP per capita (in US$ nominal)	GDP growth (real)	Inflation rate (in Percent)	Unemployment (in Percent)	Government debt (in % of GDP)
1980	148.6	5,110	89.4	3,075	▲6.6%	▲14.2%	9.2%	n/a
1981	▲171.4	▲5,745	▲93.2	▲3,123	▲5.4%	▲15.3%	▲9.8%	n/a
1982	▲181.3	▲5,922	▼85.9	▼2,806	▼−0.4%	▲13.7%	▲10.8%	n/a
1983	▲184.9	▼5,886	▲96.2	▲3,063	▼−1.8%	▲12.8%	▲12.5%	n/a
1984	▲201.3	▲6,250	▲84.8	▼2,634	▲5.1%	▲11.3%	▲13.7%	n/a
1985	▲205.2	▼6,221	▼64.5	▼1,955	▼−1.2%	▲16.6%	▲15.5%	n/a
1986	▲209.3	▼6,207	▲73.4	▲2,176	0.0%	▲18.1%	▲16.0%	n/a
1987	▲219.0	▲6,356	▲96.5	▲2,801	▲2.1%	▲16.5%	▲16.6%	n/a
1988	▲236.3	▲6,712	▲104.0	▲2,955	▲4.2%	▲12.8%	▲17.2%	n/a
1989	▲251.4	▲6,990	▲108.1	▲3,004	▲2.4%	▲14.6%	▲17.8%	n/a
1990	▲260.0	▲7,067	▲126.0	▲3,426	▼−0.3%	▲14.4%	▲18.8%	32.4%
1991	▲266.1	▼7,059	▲135.2	▲3,588	▼−1.0%	▲15.2%	▲20.2%	▲33.9%
1992	▲266.3	▼6,890	▲147	▲3,803	▼−2.1%	▲14.0%	▲21.2%	▲36.9%
1993	▲276.0	▲6,966	▲147.2	▼3,716	▲1.2%	▲9.7%	▲22.2%	▲40.0%
1994	▲290.9	▲7,172	▲153.6	▲3,786	▲3.2%	▲8.8%	▲22.9%	▲44.8%
1995	▲306.2	▲7,391	▲171.7	▲4,145	▲3.1%	▲8.8%	▼16.5%	▲44.9%
1996	▲325.2	▲7,705	▼163.3	▼3,870	▲4.3%	▲7.3%	▲20.3%	▼44.2%
1997	▲339.4	▲7,908	▲169	▲3,938	▲2.6%	▲8.6%	▲22.0%	▼43.2%
1998	▲345.0	▲7,916	▼152.9	▼3,508	▲0.5%	▲7.0%	▲26.1%	▲44.7%
1999	▲358.2	▲8,099	▼151.4	▼3,424	▲2.4%	▲5.1%	▼23.3%	▼42.2%
2000	▲381.7	▲8,502	▲151.9	▼3,382	▲4.2%	▲5.3%	▲23.0%	▼39.7%
2001	▲400.9	▲8,767	▼135.5	▼2,964	▲2.7%	▲5.7%	▲26.0%	▼38.0%
2002	▲422.2	▲9,107	▼129.4	▼2,791	▲3.7%	▲9.0%	▲27.8%	▼31.8%
2003	▲443.2	▲9,469	▲197.0	▲4,209	▲2.9%	▲5.9%	▼27.7%	▼31.5%
2004	▲475.8	▲10,058	▲256.2	▲5,415	▲4.6%	▲1.4%	▼25.2%	▼30.7%
2005	▲516.6	▲10,795	▲288.7	▲6,033	▲5.3%	▲3.4%	▼24.7%	▼29.6%
2006	▲562.4	▲11,610	▲304.1	▲6,276	▲5.6%	▲4.7%	▼23.6%	▼28.0%
2007	▲608.6	▲12,398	▲332.6	▲6,776	▲5.4%	▲7.1%	▼23.0%	▼24.3%
2008	▲640.1	▲12,854	▼316.5	▼6,356	▲3.2%	▲11.0%	▼22.5%	▼24.0%
2009	▼634.3	▼12,548	▲331.2	▲6,552	▼−1.5%	▲7.2%	▲23.7%	▲27.0%
2010	▲661.4	▲12,885	▲417.3	▲8,130	▲3.0%	▲4.2%	▲24.9%	▲31.2%
2011	▲696.5	▲13,362	▲458.7	▲8,799	▲3.2%	▲5.0%	▼24.8%	▲34.7%
2012	▲698.2	▲13,191	▼434.4	▼8,207	▲2.4%	▲5.6%	▲24.9%	▲37.4%
2013	▲730.5	▲13,591	▼400.9	▼7,458	▲2.5%	▲5.7%	▼24.7%	▲40.4%
2014	▲741.9	▲13,595	▼381.2	▼6,985	▲1.4%	▲6.1%	▲25.1%	▲43.3%
2015	▲758.9	▲13,697	▼346.7	▼6,257	▲1.3%	▲4.6%	▲25.4%	▲45.2%
2016	▲772.8	▲13,738	▼323.5	▼5,751	▲0.7%	▲6.3%	▲26.7%	▲47.1%
2017	▲790.2	▲13,839	▲381.3	▲6,678	▲1.2%	▲5.3%	▲27.5%	▲48.6%
2018	▲821.4	▲14,178	▲404.0	▲6,973	▲1.5%	▲4.6%	▲27.1%	▲51.7%
2019	▲838.6	▲14,271	▼388.4	▼6,609	▲0.3%	▲4.1%	▲28.7%	▲56.2%
2020	▼794.9	▼13,332	▼337.5	▼5,661	▼−6.3%	▲3.3%	▲29.2%	▲69.0%
2021	▲868.6	▲14,442	▲418.9	▲6,965	▲4.9%	▲4.6%	▲34.3%	69.0%
2022	▲949.8	▲15,556	▼405.7	▼6,694	▲1.9%	▲6.7%	▲34.6%	▼68.0%
2023	▲863.0	▼13,695	▼381.4	▼6,034	▲0.6%	▲6.0%	▼32.1%	▲74.0%
2024	▲990.7	▲15,479	▲401.1	▲6,435	▲0.5%	▲4.4%	▲32.6%	▲77.1%
2025	▲1,030.2	▲15,906	▲427.1	▲6,769	▲1.1%	▲3.2%	▼32.4%	▲78.1%

This is a chart of the trend of South Africa's gross domestic product (GDP) at market prices estimated by the International Monetary Fund:

Year	GDP, US$ bln	US dollar exchange in early January	Unemployment rate	Per capita income, in US$
1980	80.547	0.8267 Rand	9.2	2764
1985	57.273	2.0052 Rand	15.5	1736
1990	111.998	2.5419 Rand	16.0	3039
1995	151.117	3.5486 Rand	16.7	3684
2000	132.964	6.1188 Rand	25.6	2986
2005	246.956	5.6497 Rand	26.7	5267
2010	363.655	7.462 Rand	24.9	7274
2015	346.660	15.52 Rand	22.8	5744
2020	337.880	14.65 Rand	29.2	5638
2025	427.1	18.84 Rand	32.9	6769

== Sectors ==
South Africa has a comparative advantage in the production of agriculture, mining and manufacturing products relating to these sectors. South Africa has shifted from a primary and secondary economy in the mid-twentieth century to an economy driven primarily by the tertiary sector in the present day which accounts for an estimated 65% of GDP or $230 billion in nominal GDP terms. The country's economy is reasonably diversified with key economic sectors including mining, agriculture and fisheries, vehicle manufacturing and assembly, food processing, clothing and textiles, telecommunication, energy, financial and business services, real estate, tourism, manufacturing, IT, transportation, and wholesale and retail trade.

Seasonally adjusted and annualised quarterly value added (Q1 2013)
Industry	Value added (R billion, 2004 prices)
Agriculture, forestry and fishing	43.382
Mining and quarrying	97.096
Manufacturing (incl Space industry)	296.586
Electricity, gas and water	33.951
Construction	59.943
Wholesale and retail trade, hotels and restaurants	246.584
Transport, storage and communication	178.591
Finance, real estate and business services	422.850
General government services	271.209
Personal services	107.690
Taxes less subsidies on products	215.668
GDP at market prices	1,973.552

=== Agriculture, animal husbandry, aquaculture and food processing ===
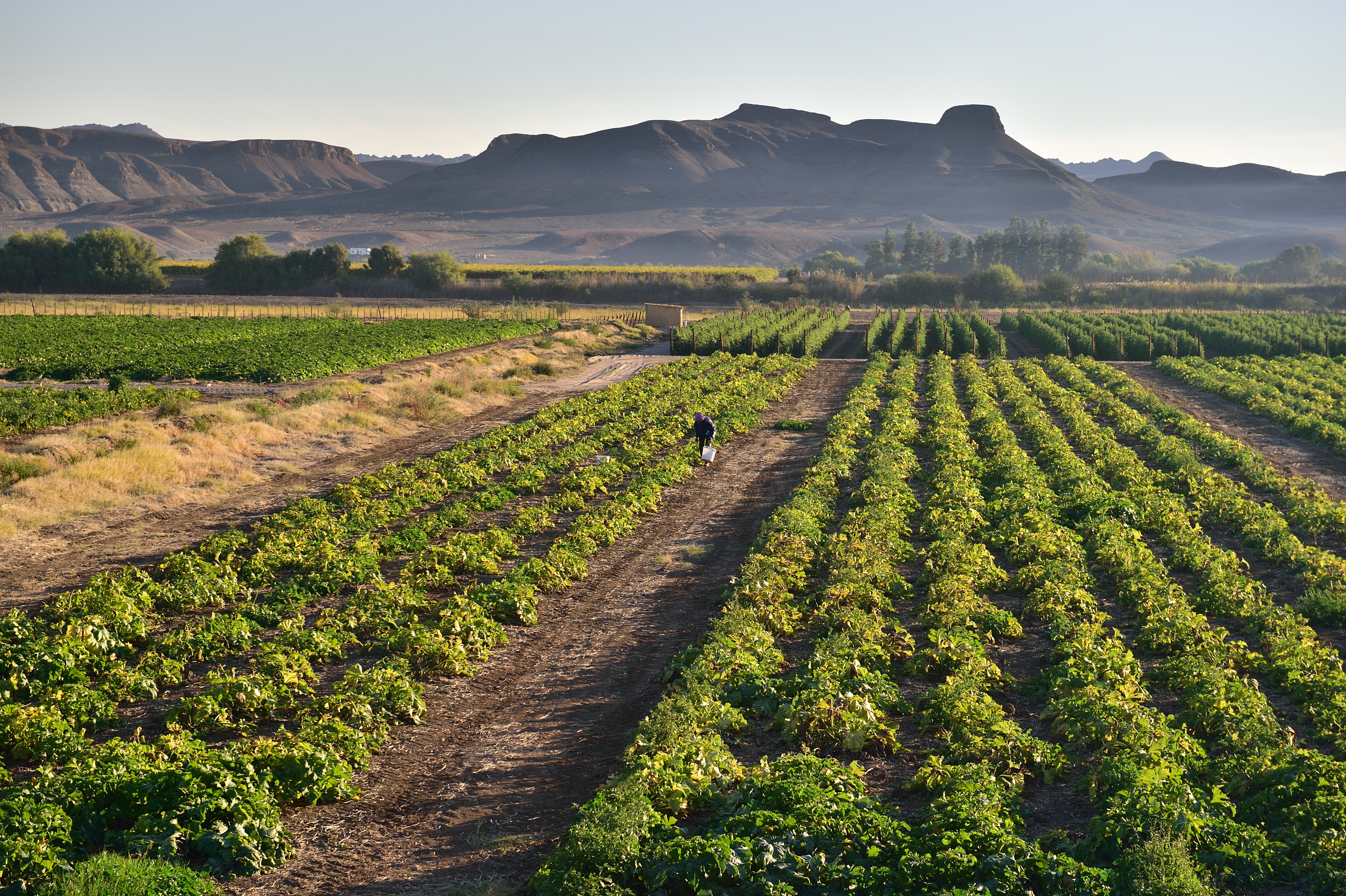
A worker planting on a farm in the Northern Cape province

In 2018, South Africa produced 19.3 million tonnes of sugarcane (14th largest producer in the world), 12.5 million tonnes of maize (12th largest producer in the world) 1.9 million tons of grape (11th largest producer in the world), 1.7 million tons of orange (11th largest producer in the world) and 397 thousand tons of pear (7th largest producer in the world).

In addition, in the same year, it produced 2.4 million tons of potato, 1.8 million tons of wheat, 1.5 million tons of soy, 862 thousand tons of sunflower seed, 829 thousand tons of apple, 726 thousand tons of onion, 537 thousand tons of tomato, 474 thousand tons of lemon, 445 thousand tons of grapefruit, 444 thousand tons of banana, 421 thousand tons of barley, in addition to smaller productions of other agricultural products, such as avocado, pineapple, peach, tangerine, pumpkin, cabbage, carrot, rapeseed, sorghum etc.

The agricultural industry contributes around 5% of formal employment, relatively low compared to other parts of Africa, as well as providing work for casual labourers and contributing around 2.8% of GDP for the nation. However, due to the aridity of the land, only 13.5% can be used for crop production, and only 3% is considered high potential land.

The sector continues to face problems, with increased foreign competition and crime being two of the major challenges for the industry. The government has been accused of either putting in too much effort, or not enough effort, to tackle the problem of farm attacks as opposed to other forms of violent crime.

Maize production, which contributes to a 36% majority of the gross value of South Africa's field crops, has also experienced negative effects due to climate change. The estimated value of loss, which takes into consideration scenarios with and without the carbon dioxide fertilisation effect, ranges between tens and hundreds of millions of Rands.

According to FAOSTAT, South Africa is one of world's largest producers of: chicory roots (4th); grapefruit (4th); cereals (5th); green maize and maize (7th); castor oil seed (9th); pears (9th); sisal (10th); fibre crops (10th). In the first quarter of 2010, the agricultural sector earned export revenues for R10.1 billion and used R8.4 billion to pay for imported agricultural products, therefore earning a positive trade balance of R1.7 billion.

The most important agricultural exports of South Africa include: edible fruit and nuts, beverages, preserved food, tobacco, cereals, wool not carded or combed, miscellaneous food, sugar, meat, milling products, malt and starch. These products accounted for over 80% of agricultural export revenue in the first quarter of 2010. The most important agricultural imports, which accounted for over 60% of agricultural import value during the same period, include: cereals, meat, soya-bean oil cake, beverages, soya-bean oil and its fractions, tobacco, palm oil and its fractions, miscellaneous food, spices, coffee, tea, and preserved food.

The dairy industry consists of around 4,300 milk producers providing employment for 60,000 farm workers and contributing to the livelihoods of around 40,000 others.

The food sub-sector is the largest employer within the agro-processing sector – contributing 1.4% to total employment, and 11.5% within the manufacturing sector. In 2006, the agro-processing sector represented 24.7% of the total manufacturing output. Although the economy as a whole gained 975,941 jobs between 1995 and 2006, the agro-processing sector lost 45,977 jobs. The competitive pressures from abroad, particularly from China and India, played a role in the decline of exports for the food, textiles and paper sub-sectors, as firms in these sectors increasingly compete with lower cost producers. Increased exports from the beverages, tobacco, wood and leather sub-sectors over the period are probably due to the presence of large dominant firms within these sectors in South Africa, that have managed to remain competitive.

=== Industry ===
==== Natural resources and mining ====
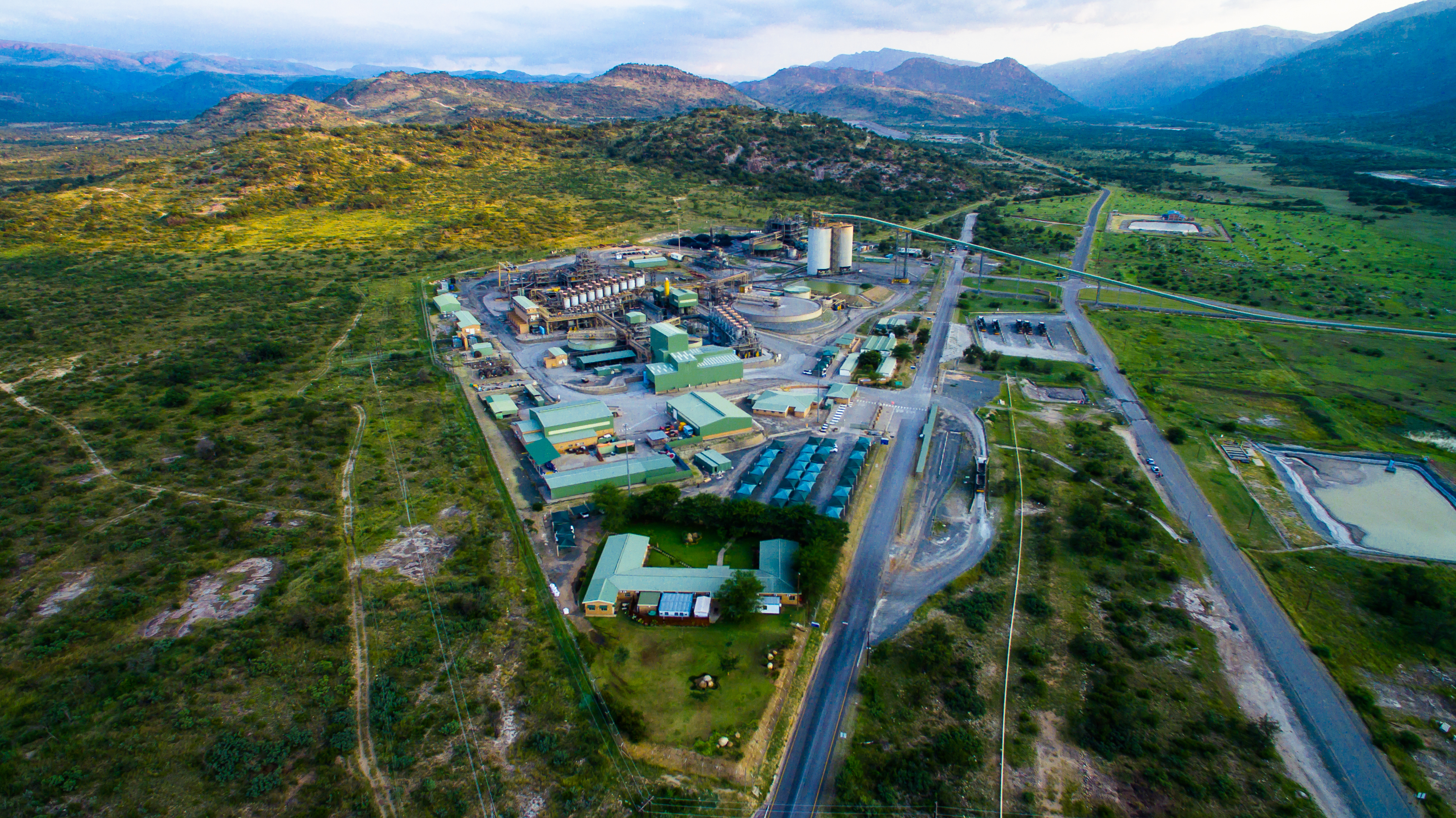
An aerial view of the Two Rivers mine in Steelpoort, Limpopo, owned by both African Rainbow Minerals and Impala Platinum Holdings Limited

In 2019, the country was the world's largest producer of platinum; the world's largest producer of chromium; the world's largest producer of manganese; the 2nd largest world producer of titanium; the world's 11th largest producer of gold; the 3rd worldwide producer of vanadium; the 6th largest world producer of iron ore; the 11th largest world producer of cobalt; and the 15th largest world producer of phosphate. It was the world's 12th largest producer of uranium in 2018.

Mining has been the main driving force behind the history and development of Africa's most advanced economy. Large-scale and profitable mining started with the discovery of a diamond on the banks of the Orange River in 1867 by Erasmus Jacobs and the subsequent discovery and exploitation of the Kimberley pipes a few years later. Gold rushes to Pilgrim's Rest and Barberton were precursors to the biggest discovery of all, the Main Reef/Main Reef Leader on Gerhardus Oosthuizen's farm Langlaagte, Portion C, in 1886, the Witwatersrand Gold Rush and the subsequent rapid development of the goldfield there, the biggest of them all.

South Africa is one of the world's leading mining and mineral-processing countries. Though mining's contribution to the national GDP has fallen substantially from its historical levels, the sector contributed 6.1% of nominal GDP in 2024.

In 2008, South Africa's estimated share of world platinum production amounted to 77%; kyanite and other materials, 55%; chromium, 45%; palladium, 39%; vermiculite, 39%; vanadium, 38%; zirconium, 30%; manganese, 21%; rutile, 20%; ilmenite, 19%; gold, 11%; fluorspar, 6%; aluminium, 2%; antimony, 2%; iron ore, 2%; nickel, 2%; and phosphate rock, 1%. South Africa also accounted for nearly 5% of the world's polished diamond production by value. The country's estimated share of world reserves of platinum group metals amounted to 89%; hafnium, 46%; zirconium, 27%; vanadium, 23%; manganese, 19%; rutile, 18%; fluorspar, 18%; gold, 13%; phosphate rock, 10%; ilmenite, 9%; and nickel, 5%. It is also the world's third largest coal exporter.

The mining sector has a mix of privately owned and state-controlled mines, the latter including African Exploration Mining and Finance Corporation.

==== Petroleum ====
The South African petroleum industry contributed 3% to South Africa's GDP in 2022.

The country has two operational oil refineries – the Astron Energy Refinery in Cape Town and the Natref Refinery in Sasolburg, Free State. The two facilities have a combined crude oil refining capacity of 208,000 barrels per day.

SA has around 2,500km of fuel pipelines owned and operated by state-owned Transnet; approximately 2.46 billion liters of licensed storage capacity for diesel, gasoline, and jet fuel; and crude oil storage facilities managed by the Strategic Fuel Fund.

In terms of the retail market, in 2025 there were 4,000 forecourts operated by seven different petroleum companies. The largest of these by number of locations is Engen Petroleum.

==== Manufacturing ====
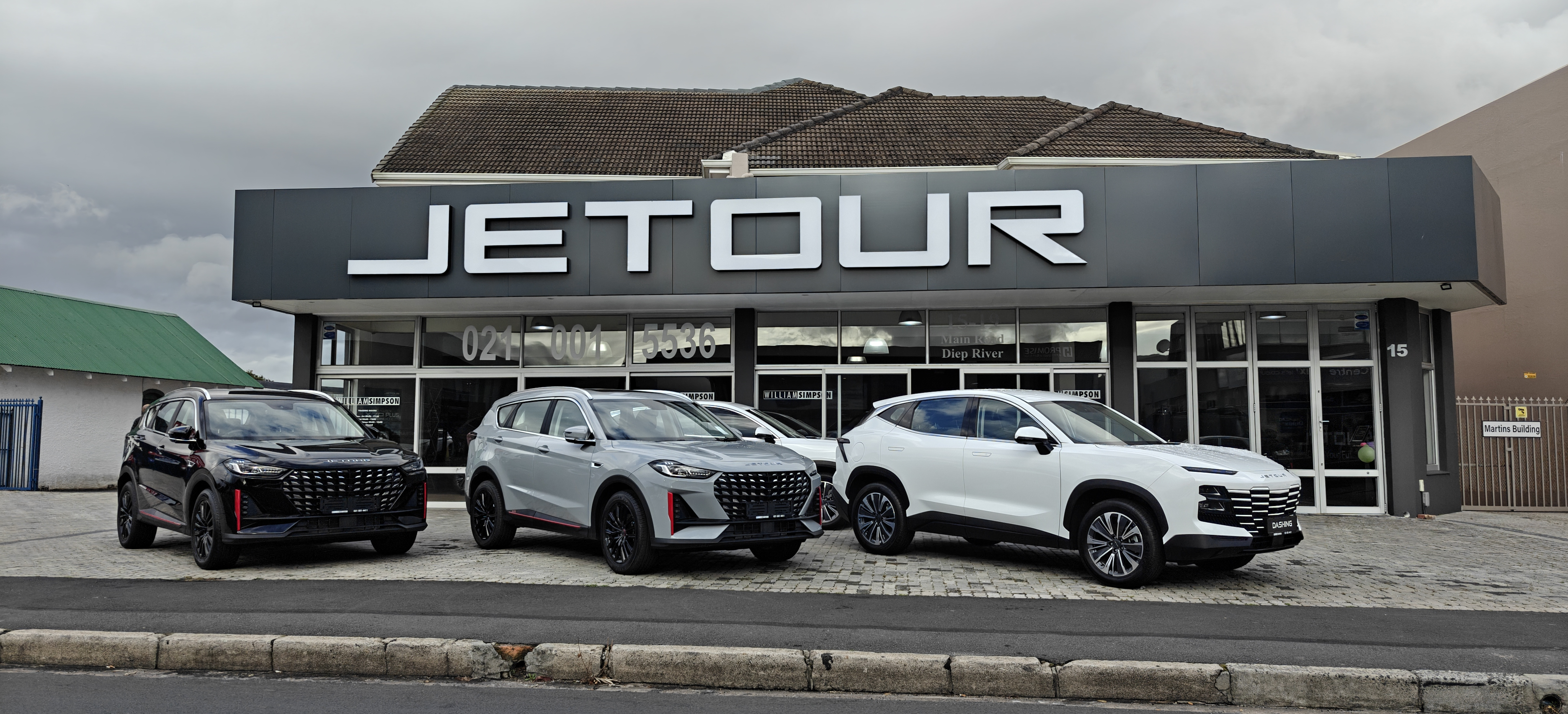
Jetour car dealership in Plumstead, Cape Town

The manufacturing industry's contribution to the economy is relatively small, providing just 13.3% of jobs and 15% of GDP. There are growing sectors of manufacturing, however, such as in the Space industry. Labour costs are low, but not nearly as low as in most other emerging markets, and the cost of the transport, communications and general living is much higher.

The South African automotive industry accounts for about 10% of South Africa's manufacturing exports, contributes 7.5% to the country's GDP and employs around 36,000 people. Annual production in 2007 was 535,000 vehicles, out of a global production of 73 million units in the same year. Vehicle exports were in the region of 170,000 units in 2007, exported mainly to Japan (about 29% of the value of total exports), Australia (20%), the United Kingdom (12%) and the United States (11%). South Africa also exported ZAR 30.3 billion worth of auto components in 2006.

BMW, Ford, Volkswagen, Daimler-Chrysler, General Motors, Nissan and Toyota all have production plants in South Africa. Large component manufacturers with bases in the country are Arvin Exhaust, Bloxwitch, Corning and Senior Flexonics. There are also about 200 automotive component manufacturers in South Africa, and more than 150 others that supply the industry on a non-exclusive basis. The industry is concentrated in two provinces, the Eastern Cape and Gauteng. Companies producing in South Africa can take advantage of the low production costs and the access to new markets as a result of trade agreements with the European Union and the Southern African Development Community.

After a steep decline of 10.4% in 2009, the manufacturing sector performed well in 2010, growing by 5%, though this rebound was primarily limited to the automotive, basic chemicals, iron and steel and food and beverages industries. The performance of this sector remains curtailed by the low demand in South Africa's main export markets in the developed world. There is growth in some areas, such as the Space industry in South Africa, which is expected to see an increase in Space industry jobs, and jobs in supporting technology and manufacturing sectors.

==== Defence ====
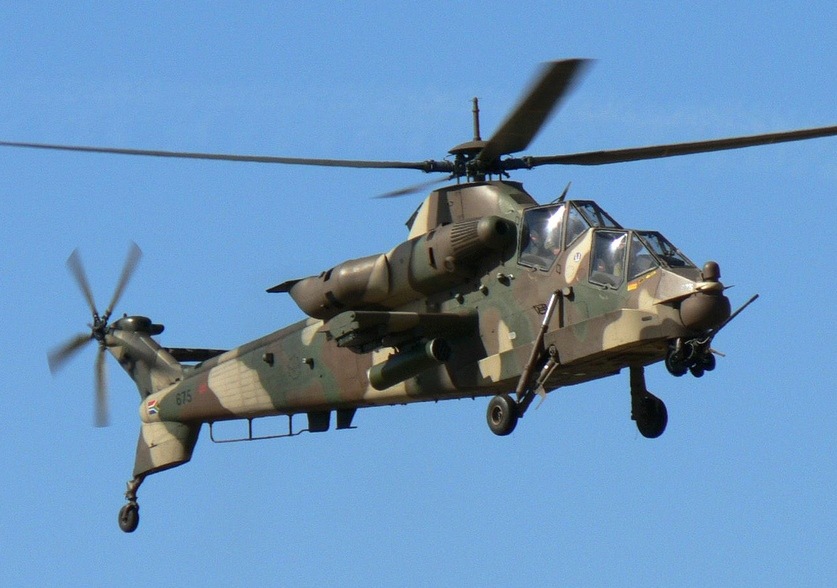
A Rooivalk attack helicopter produced by Denel

South Africa possesses Africa's most advanced defence industry and one of the country's leading high-technology manufacturing sectors. The South African defence industry (SADI) comprises more than 600 state-owned and private companies engaged in the research, development, manufacture and support of military equipment and technologies. The industry maintains capabilities across small arms and ammunition, armoured vehicles, artillery, missiles, military aircraft, naval vessels, electronic systems and unmanned systems, supporting the South African National Defence Force (SANDF) and exports to international markets. Major manufacturers include Denel, Paramount Group and Milkor.

The Stockholm International Peace Research Institute (SIPRI) ranked South Africa 21st globally among exporters of major conventional arms in 2018–2023. In 2026, the government stated that South Africa had risen to 17th despite having one of the world's smallest defence budgets among countries with an established defence industry.

==== Construction ====
The construction industry is an important part of South Africa's economy, contributing slightly over 2% of GDP and employing approximately 1.36 million people, making it the country's fifth-largest employer in 2025.

The sector plays an important role in job creation and economic inclusion, while supporting infrastructure development in transport, energy, water and sanitation. Public-sector infrastructure expenditure was projected to exceed R1 trillion over the 2025–26 Medium-Term Expenditure Framework.

=== Services ===
==== Banking and finance ====
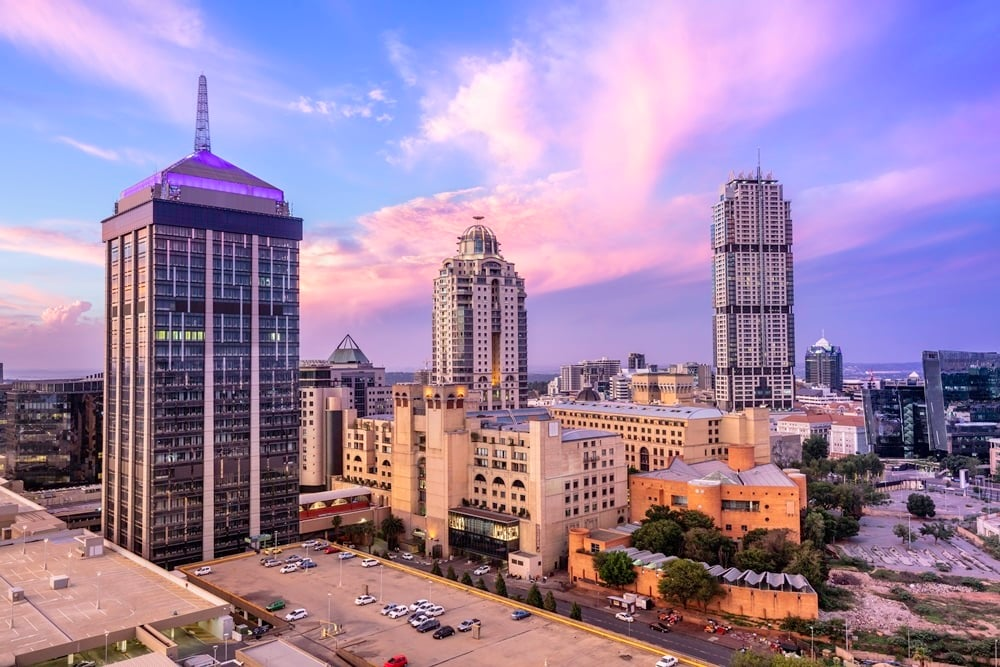
Sandton, Gauteng, is widely known for containing Africa's richest square mile

The financial services sector is one of South Africa's most developed industries and is widely regarded as the most advanced in Africa. Banking is regulated by the South African Reserve Bank, with major institutions including Standard Bank, First National Bank, Absa, Nedbank and Capitec. Standard Bank is Africa's largest banking group by assets, while Capitec has become one of the country's largest retail banks. The sector also includes insurance, asset management, investment banking and other financial services, supporting both domestic economic activity and regional markets.

The Johannesburg Stock Exchange (JSE) is Africa's largest stock exchange by both market capitalisation and number of listed companies, and is the principal financial market in the country. South Africa's total stock market capitalisation reached approximately US$1.53 trillion in 2026, ranking 16th globally. Johannesburg is the continent's leading financial centre, with Sandton serving as a major concentration of banks, investment firms and corporate headquarters.

South Africa's financial system is supported by a sophisticated regulatory framework and developed financial infrastructure, while its banks and financial institutions maintain a significant presence elsewhere in Africa. The country's financial sector therefore serves as both a major domestic industry and an important regional financial hub.

==== Retail and hospitality ====
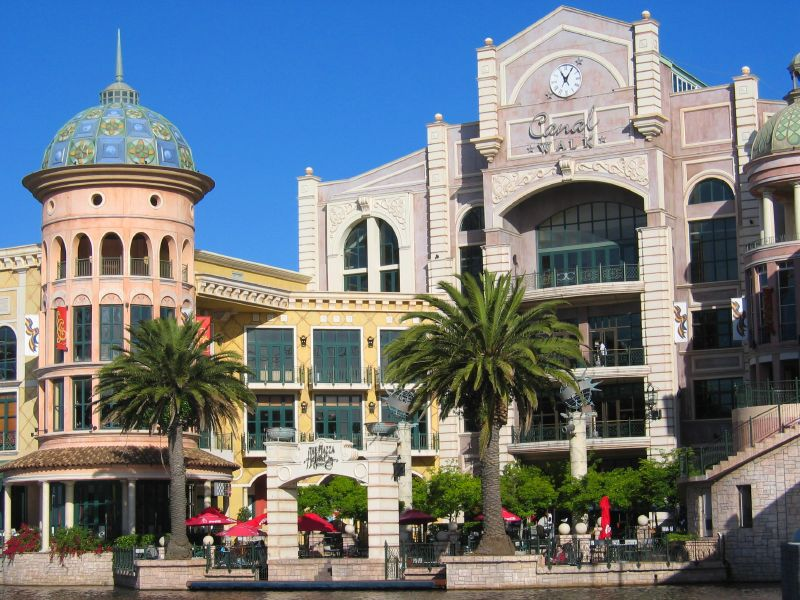
Canal Walk shopping centre in Century City, Cape Town

The retail sector is a major component of South Africa's services economy and an important source of employment and urban economic activity. The country has Africa's largest and most developed retail market, with extensive supermarket networks, shopping centres and e-commerce, employing approximately 3.25 million people, or more than one-fifth of the national workforce. It has the largest number of shopping centres in Africa and the sixth-highest number globally, including major centres such as Sandton City, Gateway Theatre of Shopping and Canal Walk. Major domestic retailers include Shoprite, Woolworths, Pick n Pay, SPAR and Mr Price Group.

The hospitality industry is another significant service industry, encompassing accommodation, restaurants, catering and entertainment. It supports substantial employment and consumer spending, with major hotels, restaurants and hospitality businesses operating throughout the country's urban centres, coastal areas and other commercial destinations.

==== Housing and real estate ====
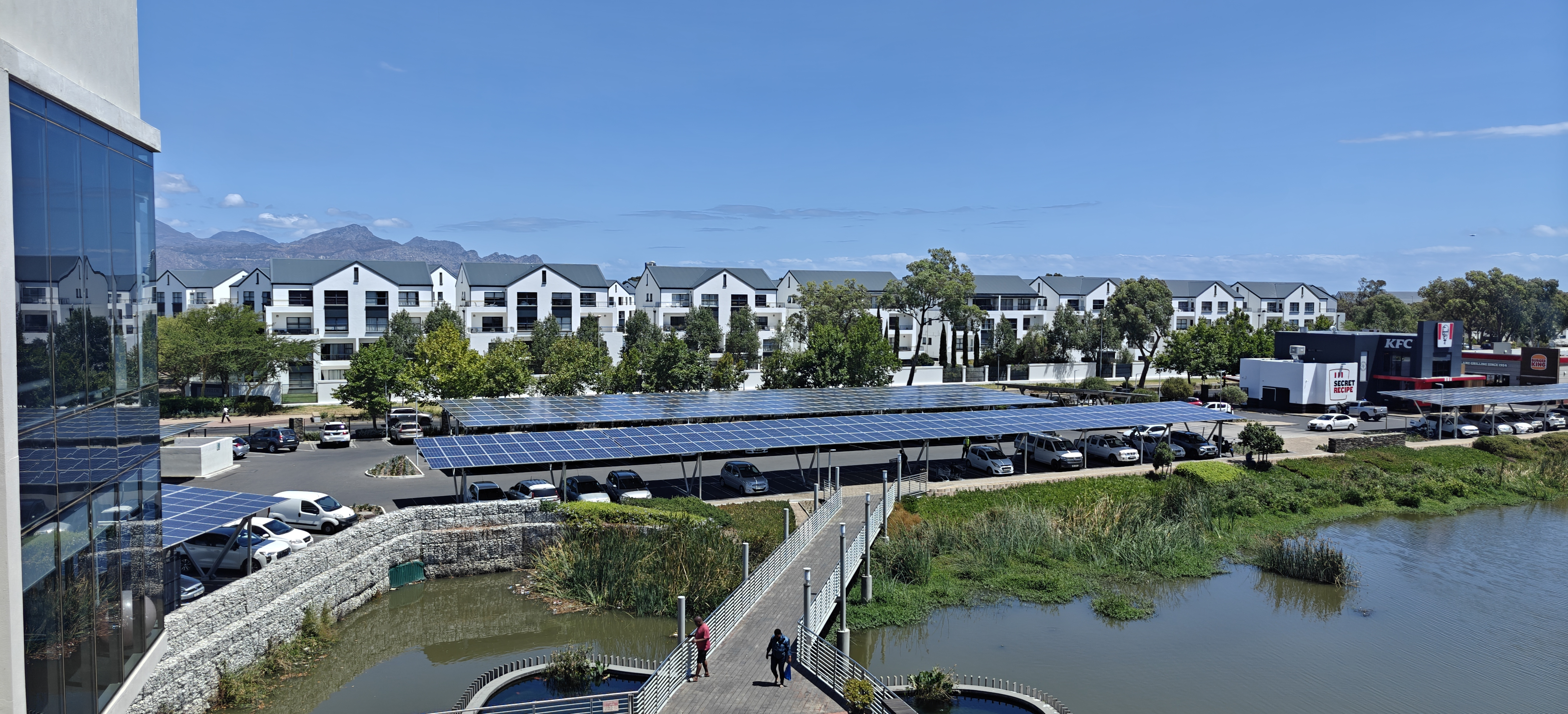
Modern, multi-story housing in Somerset West, Cape Town

South Africa has a substantial residential property market, particularly in major cities, where home ownership remains an important form of household wealth and investment. Housing is dominated by detached houses, townhouses, apartments and gated communities, with significant differences in property values between urban areas and suburbs. Cape Town, Johannesburg and Durban are among the country's largest residential property markets, with Cape Town generally recording the highest average property prices.

The residential property sector supports a broad construction and financial services industry, while housing demand continues to be influenced by urbanisation, household incomes and population growth. In the first quarter of 2026, the average South African home was valued at approximately R1.73 million, an increase of 4.7% from the previous year, with growing demand for mid- and high-priced properties.

==== Tourism ====
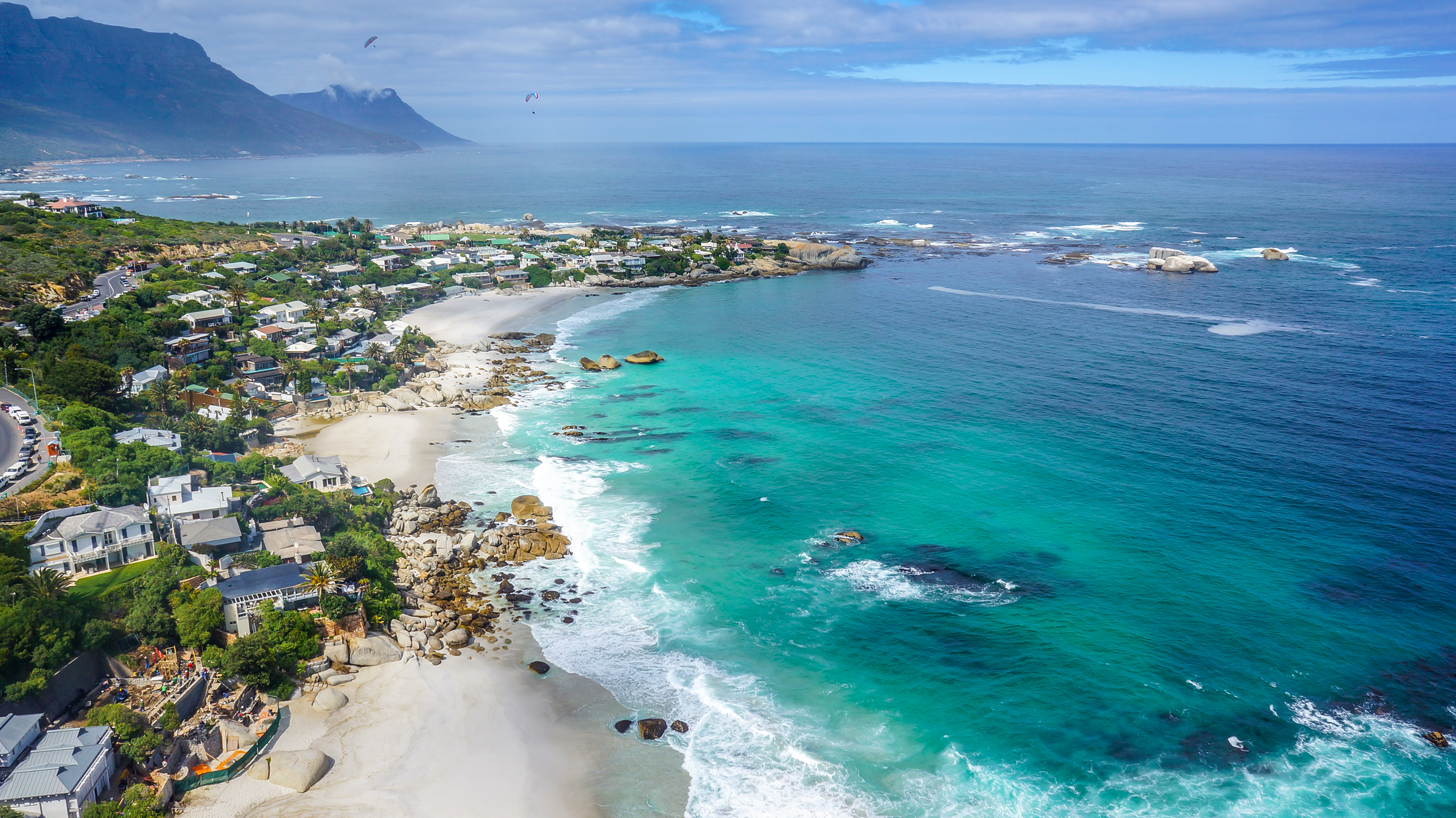
Clifton Beach in Cape Town is one of South Africa's most famous beaches

South Africa is one of the world's leading tourist destinations, with tourism contributing approximately 5.8% of GDP and supporting around 1.8 million jobs. In 2024, the country welcomed approximately 8.9 million international visitors, making tourism an important component of the wider services sector and national economy. Among its main attractions are its diverse landscapes, abundant wildlife and cultural heritage, including Kruger National Park, Table Mountain, the Garden Route, and the beaches of the Western Cape and KwaZulu-Natal.

The country's major cities and wine regions are also important tourism destinations, with Cape Town, Johannesburg, Durban, Stellenbosch and Franschhoek attracting visitors for their cultural, commercial and recreational offerings. Safari and wine tourism remain major components of the industry, supported by an extensive network of national parks, private game reserves and vineyards.

==== Education ====
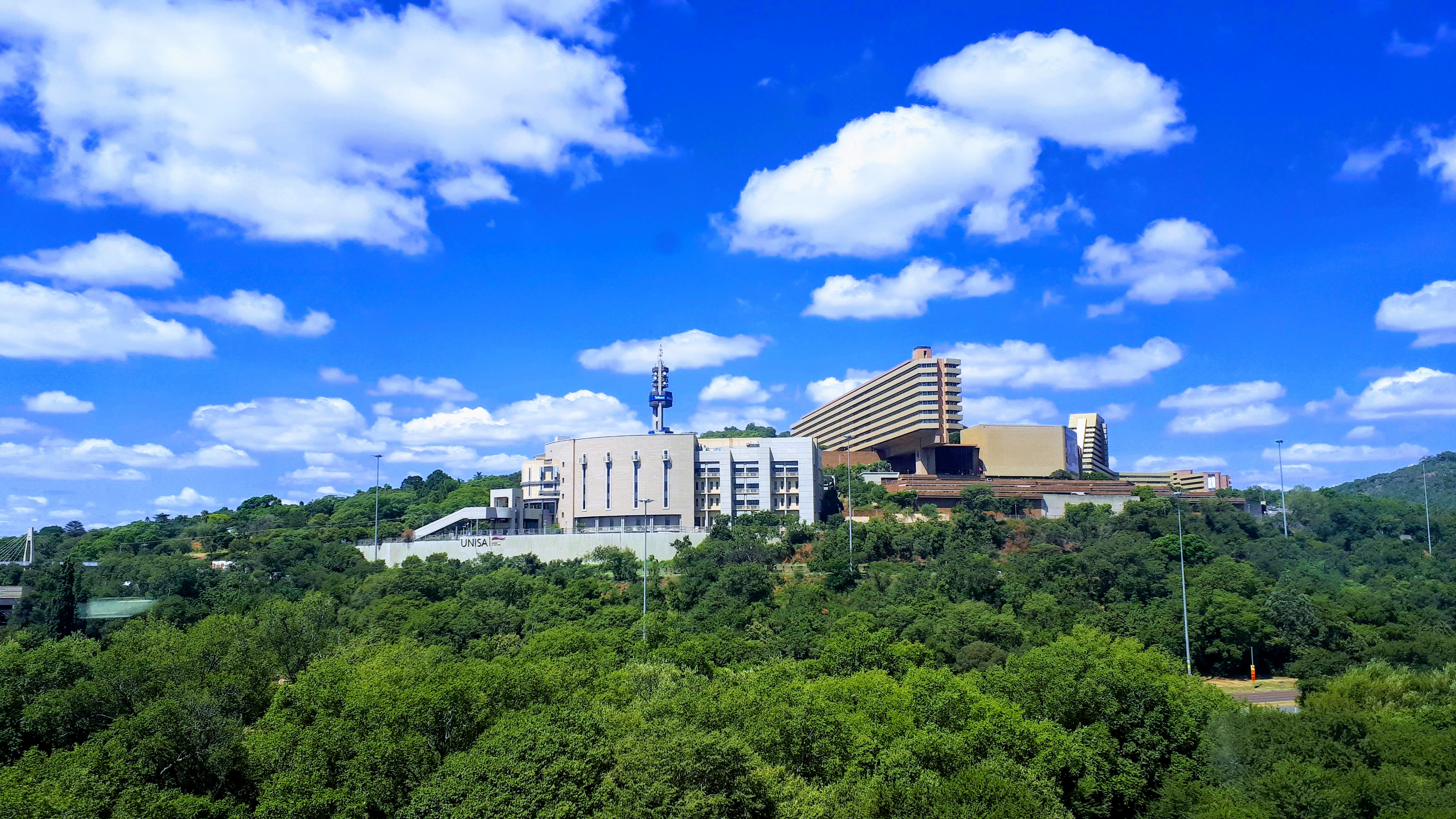
The University of South Africa (UNISA) in Pretoria, one of the world's largest and most prominent mega universities

Schooling in South Africa follows a three-tier system comprising primary education, secondary education and tertiary education. Learners generally complete twelve years of formal schooling from Grade 1 to Grade 12, with Grade R serving as a pre-primary foundation year. Primary education covers the first seven years, followed by five years of secondary education, culminating in the National Senior Certificate examination, commonly known as matric, which is required for admission to most tertiary institutions. South Africa had an adult literacy rate of approximately 95% in 2025, the second-highest in Africa after Seychelles.

Tertiary education is provided by 23 public universities, comprising traditional universities, universities of technology and comprehensive universities, alongside a large network of Technical and Vocational Education and Training (TVET) colleges. The higher education system underwent major restructuring in the 2000s, with smaller institutions merged or incorporated into larger universities. Government financial aid has also expanded access to tertiary education, with approximately 1.4 million students receiving assistance by 2015.

==== Healthcare ====
South Africa has one of the largest and the most advanced and developed healthcare systems in Africa, with healthcare expenditure accounting for approximately 9% of GDP. The system is divided between a large public sector serving around 84% of the population and a smaller private sector used by approximately 20%, with considerable overlap between the two. Public healthcare provides the majority of services but faces persistent resource and staffing constraints, while private healthcare is better resourced but largely accessible to those covered by medical aid or able to pay directly.

The private healthcare industry includes major hospital groups such as Netcare, Mediclinic and Life Healthcare, which together account for a large share of the private hospital market. The government is pursuing reform through the National Health Insurance (NHI), intended to expand access to healthcare and reduce disparities between the public and private systems.

==== Logistics ====
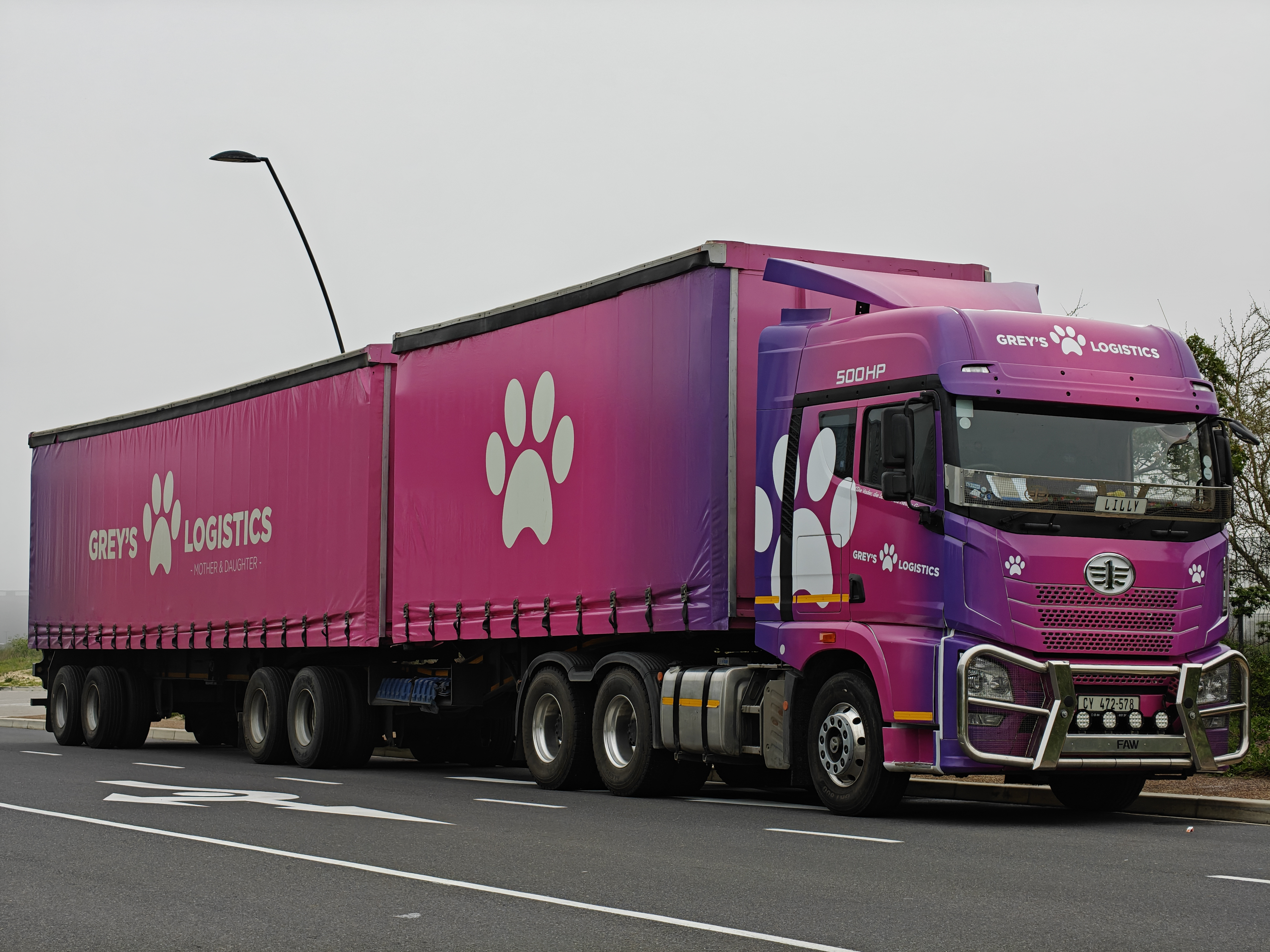
Freight semi-truck in Milnerton, Cape Town, which is home to numerous large warehouses

South Africa has the most extensive and advanced logistics industry in Africa, supporting domestic supply chains and international trade through a multimodal network of roads, railways, ports and airports. The sector generated more than half a trillion rand in economic output in 2024, with its infrastructure and performance ranking among the strongest on the continent. In the 2023 World Bank Logistics Performance Index, South Africa ranked joint 19th out of 139 countries, an improvement of 14 places from the previous assessment.

The sector encompasses freight transport, warehousing, distribution, courier services and e-commerce, with major operators including Transnet, DP World, DHL and DSV. Large distribution and warehousing hubs are concentrated around Johannesburg, Durban and Cape Town, supporting the country's manufacturing, retail and export industries.

==== Business process outsourcing ====
Over the last few decades, South Africa and particularly the Cape Town region has established itself as a successful call centre and business process outsourcing destination. With a large labour pool and with Cape Town sharing cultural affinity with Britain, large overseas firms such as Lufthansa, Amazon.com, ASDA, The Carphone Warehouse, Delta Air Lines and many more have established inbound call centres within Cape Town as a means of utilising Cape Town's low labour costs and large labour force.

==== Informal sector ====
South Africa's informal sector contributes 8% of the country's GDP and supports 27% of all working people. The South African Local Economic Development Network values the informal economy at 28% of SA's GDP. Given the relevance of this input, there is a constant interest in developing actions on an inclusive urban planning for the working poor.

== Infrastructure ==
=== Energy ===
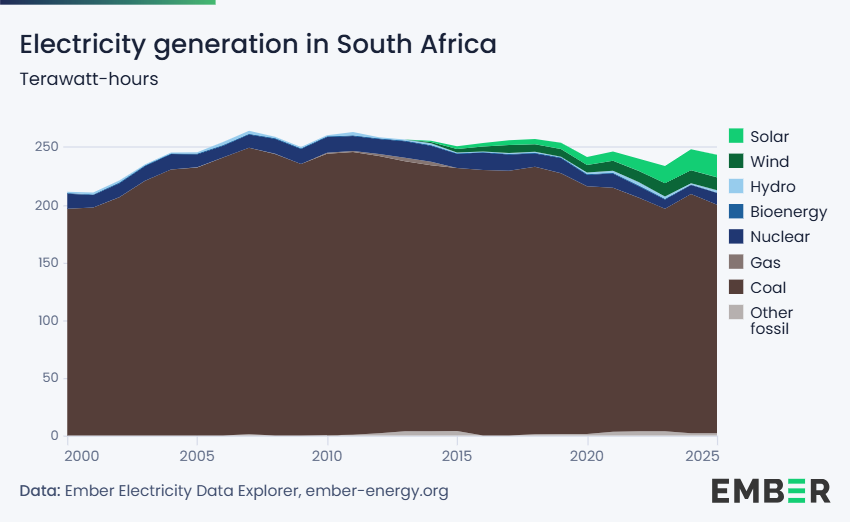
Electricity generation in South Africa in terawatt-hours

Scheduled rolling blackouts were a part of daily life due to widespread electricity theft and government mismanagement of energy infrastructure. After years of sub-standard maintenance and the South African government's inability to manage strategic resources, the state-owned power supplier Eskom started experiencing deficiency in capacity in the electrical generating and reticulation infrastructure in 2007. Such lack led to inability to meet the routine demands of industry and consumers, resulting in countrywide rolling blackouts.

Initially, the lack of capacity was triggered by a failure at Koeberg nuclear power station, but a general lack of capacity due to increased demand and lack of government planning soon came to light. The supplier and the South African government has been widely criticised for failing to adequately plan for and construct sufficient electrical generating capacity, although ultimately the government has admitted that it was at fault for refusing to approve funding for investment in infrastructure.

The margin between national demand and available capacity is still low or negative (particularly in peak hours), and power stations are under strain, such that surges in demand, which are common during winter, or drops in supply, often a result of a lack of coal for power plants, result in another phase of rolling blackouts. The government and Eskom are currently planning new power stations, at cost to the South African consumer. The power utility plans to have 20,000 megawatts of nuclear power in its grid by 2025.

Total energy consumption in Terrawatt-hours (TWh)
1970	1980	1990	2000	2010	2020	2023
421	▲646	▲1,030	▲1,185	▲1,464	▼1,393	▼1,348
	Per capita consumption in Kilowatt-hours (KWh)					
18,843	▲21,921	▲25,821	▼25,322	▲28,271	▼23,688	▼22,314

=== Transport ===
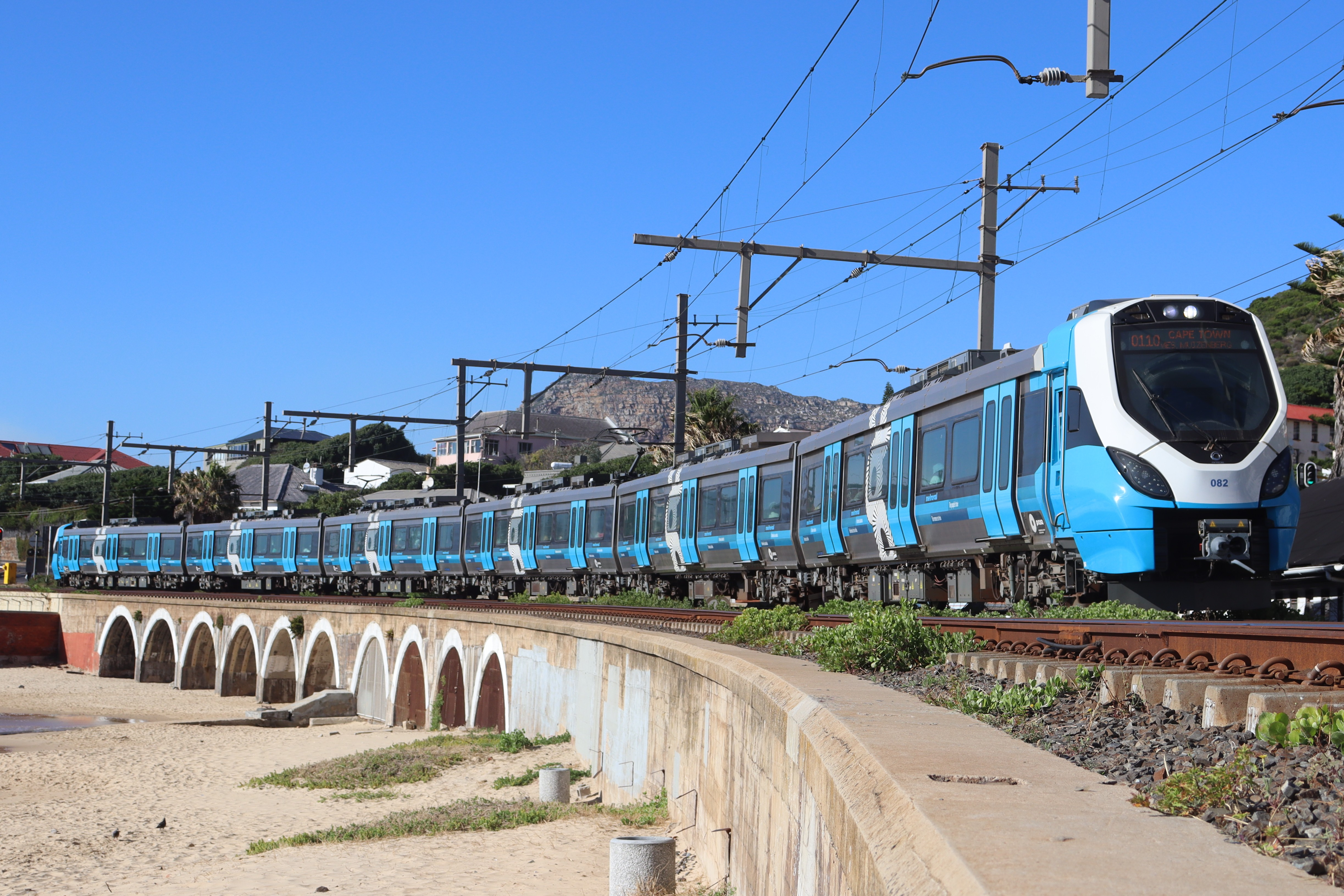
An X'trapolis Mega (Metrorail) train on the Southern Line in Cape Town

South Africa has the most extensive transport infrastructure network in Africa, comprising roads, railways, airports, seaports and pipelines. Its road network extends for approximately 750,000 kilometres (470,000 mi), making it the largest in Africa and the 12th-largest in the world. The South African National Roads Agency (SANRAL) manages the national road system, including major routes such as the N1, N2, N3 and N4, which connect the country's major cities and support domestic and regional trade.

The railway network extends approximately 36,000 kilometres (23,700 mi), making it the largest in Africa and the seventh-largest in the world. Freight is operated primarily by Transnet Freight Rail, while commuter services are provided by the Passenger Rail Agency of South Africa (PRASA). The Gautrain links Johannesburg and Pretoria and provides the country's only higher-speed rail service. South Africa also has more than 1,500 airports, including O. R. Tambo International Airport, the country's principal international gateway and one of Africa's busiest airports.

The country's maritime infrastructure is centred on the commercial ports of Durban, Cape Town, Gqeberha, Richards Bay, Saldanha Bay and East London. The Port of Durban is the busiest container port in sub-Saharan Africa, while the Port of Richards Bay is a major bulk-export facility. Together with the country's road, rail and aviation networks, these ports form a critical part of South Africa's logistics infrastructure and its role as a regional gateway for trade.

=== Telecommunications ===
The domestic telecommunications infrastructure provides modern and efficient service to urban and rural areas. This includes cellular and internet services from 5G to Gigabit Broadband.

In 1997, Telkom, the South African telecommunications parastatal, was partly privatised and entered into a strategic equity partnership with a consortium of SBC (AT&T), in exchange for a monopoly to provide certain services for 5 years. Telkom assumed an obligation to facilitate network modernisation and expansion into the unserved areas. A Second Network Operator, Neotel was to be licensed to compete with Telkom across its spectrum of services in 2002. Licensing officially began in late 2005.

Five mobile-phone companies provide service to over 50 million subscribers, with South Africa considered to have the 4th most advanced mobile telecommunications network worldwide. The five major cellular providers are Vodacom, MTN, Telkom, Cell C, and Rain. Neotel, now owned by Liquid Intelligent Technologies, no longer operates a mobile network.

South African companies which provide services related to the Space industry, also increasing, and with the correct government legislation and support, this sector is expected to grow in South Africa.

=== Water supply and sanitation ===
Some predictions show surface water supply could decrease by 60% by the year 2070 in parts of the Western Cape.

The South African government planned to spend R69 billion on water infrastructure between 2008 and 2015. This involves building new dams and ancillary infrastructure, and repairing existing infrastructure. South Africa has an estimated total water capacity of 38 billion cubic metres, but will need 65 billion by 2025 if the economy is to keep on growing. The massive urban migration has placed further strain on the country's ageing water infrastructure and created a large backlog.

=== Developments and Maintenance ===
As part of an international attempt to modernise infrastructure, South Africa has faced increasing pressure to invest government funds into its water and electricity sectors. At current, these sectors are underfunded by approximately US$464 billion (This is according to the G20 GI Hub).

== Currency ==
The South African rand is the currency of South Africa, with its main unit, the rand, represented by the symbol 'R'. The South African Reserve Bank is responsible for issuing the currency and managing monetary policy. The rand is also legal tender in the Common Monetary Area, alongside the currencies of Eswatini, Lesotho and Namibia.

The rand is one of the most actively traded currencies in emerging markets and is widely used as a proxy for investment in African markets. South Africa maintains a floating exchange rate, with the value of the rand determined primarily by foreign exchange markets.

== Trade and investment ==
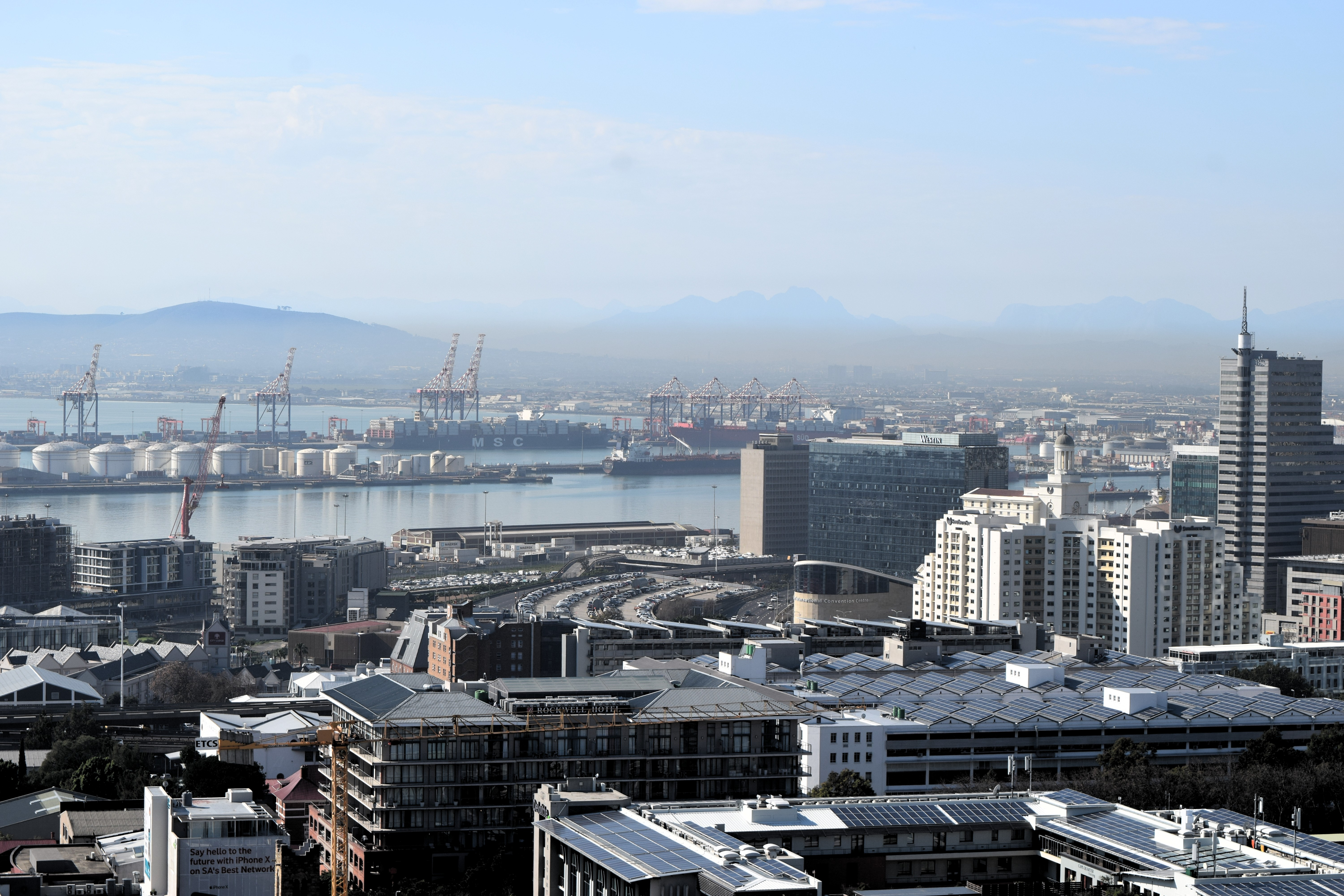
The Port of Cape Town is a major shipping hub in South Africa, with an annual cargo volume of around 700,000 TEU as of 2024. The port also serves as a major tourist hub.

Principal international trading partners of South Africa—besides other African countries—include Germany, the United States, China, Japan, the United Kingdom, Bangladesh and Spain. Chief exports include corn, diamonds, fruits, gold, metals and minerals, sugar, and wool. Machinery and transportation equipment make up more than one-third of the value of the country's imports. Other imports include chemicals, manufactured goods, and petroleum.

As a result of a November 1993 bilateral agreement, the Overseas Private Investment Corporation (OPIC) can assist US investors in the South African market with services such as political risk insurance and loans and loan guarantees. In July 1996, the US and South Africa signed an investment fund protocol for a $120 million OPIC fund to make equity investments in South and Southern Africa.

OPIC is establishing an additional fund – the Sub-Saharan Africa Infrastructure Fund, capitalised at $350 million – to investment in infrastructure projects. The Trade and Development Agency also has been actively involved in funding feasibility studies and identifying investment opportunities in South Africa for U.S. businesses.

Despite the numerous positive economic achievements since 1994, South Africa has struggled to attract significant foreign direct investment. The situation may have started to change however, with 2005 seeing the largest single FDI into South Africa when Barclays bought a majority share in local bank Absa Group Limited. Deals between the British-based Vodafone and South Africa's Vodacom have taken place in 2006. In 2010, two multibillion-dollar deals, one by HSBC to acquire Nedbank and one by Walmart to acquire Massmart Holdings, fell through. (Walmart did buy Massmart in 2011.)

== Land reform and property rights ==
=== Nationalisation of mines debate ===
South Africa has been riven by arguments over whether the state should take over mineral resources. A study commissioned by the African National Congress recommended against the policy, saying nationalisation would be an "economic disaster." However, the ANC Youth Employment supporters disagree and state that it will give the government direct control over the mining sector which is also in alignment with the Freedom Charter signed in 1995.

=== Land redistribution ===
The government aimed to transfer 30% of the 82 million hectares estimated to be in the hands of white farmers by Gugile Nkwinti, Minister of Rural Development and Land Reform, amounting to 24.5 million hectares, to black farmers by 2014. 6.7 million hectares had been transferred by early 2012 via redistribution and restitution.

The land reform program has been criticised both by farmers' groups and by landless workers, the latter alleging that the pace of change has not been fast enough, and the former alleging anti white racist treatment with threats of genocide, voiced openly on multiple occasions by the ANC, including the former president Zuma, and expressing concerns that a similar situation to Zimbabwe's land reform policy may develop, a fear exacerbated by comments made by former deputy president Phumzile Mlambo-Ngcuka.

== Labour market ==
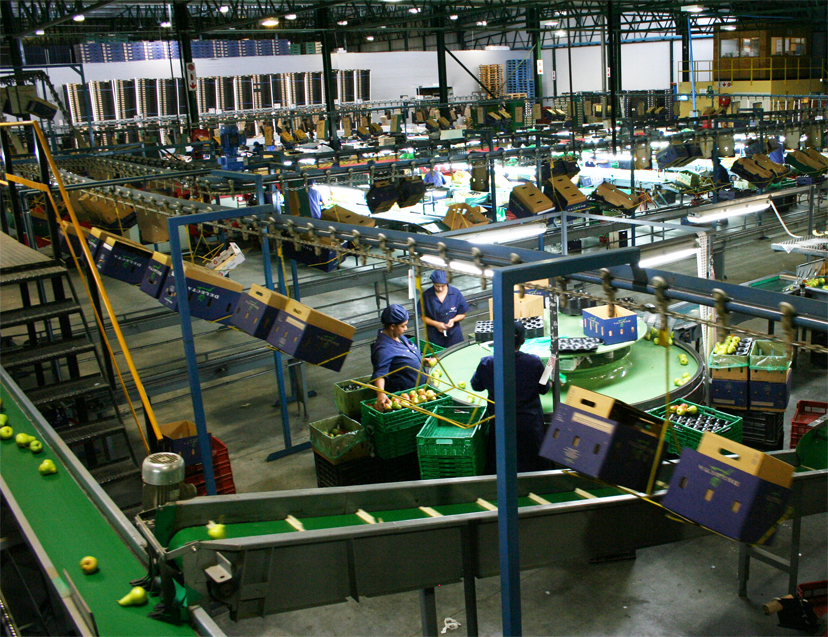
Workers packing fruit for export in a packing house in Ceres, South Africa.

South Africa has an extreme and persistent high unemployment rate of over 30%, which interacts with other socioeconomic problems such as: inadequate education, poor health and high levels of crime. The poorest have limited access to economic opportunities and basic services. According to a 2013 Goldman Sachs report, that number increases to 35% when including people who have given up looking for work. A quarter of South Africans live on less than US$1.25 a day.

South Africa's mass unemployment dates back to the 1970s, and continued to rise throughout the 1980s and 1990s. Unemployment has increased substantially since the African National Congress came to power in 1994, increasing from 15.6% in 1995 to 30.3% in 2001. In the second quarter of 2010, the jobless rate increased to 25.3%, and the number of people with work fell by 61,000 to 12,700,000. The biggest decline in employment was recorded in the manufacturing industry, which lost 53,000 jobs. Agriculture lost 32,000 jobs, employment in the construction industry fell by 15,000. In the third quarter of 2010, 29.80% of blacks were recorded as unemployed, compared with 22.30% of Coloureds, 8.60% of Asians and 5.10% of Whites.

The official unemployment rate, though very high by international standards, understates its magnitude because it includes only adults who are actively looking for work. Therefore, excluding those who have given up looking for employment. Only 41% of the population of working age have any kind of job (formal or informal). This rate is 30% points lower than that of China, and about 25% lower than that of Brazil or Indonesia. The relatively generous social grants reduces the political cost of unemployment. There is some evidence that households view paid employment and social grants as substitutes at the margin: households that lose a pension-eligible member subsequently report increased labour force participation.

The unemployment problem is characterised by its lengthy duration. In the mid-1990s, nearly two-thirds of unemployed people had never worked for a salary. The 2005 Labour Force Survey found that 40% of unemployed individuals have been unemployed for more than three years, while 59% had never had a job at all. The unemployment rate has fuelled crime, inequality and social unrest. The global economic downturn made the problem worse, wiping out more than one million jobs. In September 2010, over one-third of South Africa's workforce were out of work, and so were more than half of blacks aged 15–34, three times the level than Whites.

Some experts contend that higher wages negotiated by politically powerful trade unions have suppressed job growth. According to a study by Dani Rodrik, the shrinkage of the non-mineral tradable sector since the early-1990s and the weakness of the export-oriented manufacturing were more to blame for the low level of employment.

=== Brain drain ===
There has been a large degree of human capital flight from South Africa in recent years. South Africa's Bureau of Statistics estimates that between 1 million and 1.6 million people in skilled, professional, and managerial occupations have emigrated overseas between 1994 and 2004 and that, for every emigrant, 10 unskilled people lose their jobs. There are a range of causes cited for the migration of skilled South Africans.

In mid-1998, the Southern African Migration Project (SAMP) undertook a study to examine and assess the range of factors that contribute to skilled South Africans' desire to leave the country: over two-thirds of the sample said that they had given the idea of emigration some thought while 38% said they had given it a "great deal of thought".

Among the reasons cited for wishing to leave the country was the declining quality of life and high levels of crime. Furthermore, the government's affirmative action policy was identified as another factor influencing the emigration of skilled White South Africans. The results of the survey indicate that skilled Whites are strongly opposed to this policy and the arguments advanced in support of it, due to the negative impact it has had on South Africa.

However, flight of human capital in South Africa should not be attributed solely to regional factors. For example, the demand for skilled labourers in the UK, US, Canada, New Zealand, and Australia has led to active recruitment programs by those countries in South Africa. These countries accounted for 75% (by volume) of recent skilled emigration with the UK receiving approximately half of annual skilled South African emigration from 1990 to 1996. It has been suggested that the role of domestic socio-political variables may be negligible. The health sector has been hit particularly hard.

A widespread skills drain in South Africa and in the developing world in general is generally considered to be a cause for concern.

For the medical sector, the loss of returns from investment for all doctors emigrating is $1.41bn for South Africa. The benefit to destination countries is huge: $2.7bn for the United Kingdom alone.

In a case of reverse brain drain a net 359,000 high-skilled South Africans have returned to South Africa from foreign work assignments over a five-year period from 2008 to 2013. This was catalysed by the 2008 financial crisis and perceptions of higher quality of life in South Africa relative to the countries from which they first emigrated to. It is estimated that around 37% of those returning are professionals such as lawyers, doctors, engineers and accountants.

=== Immigration ===
Refugees from poorer neighbouring countries include many immigrants from the Democratic Republic of the Congo, Mozambique, Zimbabwe, Malawi and others, representing a large portion of the informal sector.

With high unemployment levels amongst poorer South Africans, xenophobia is prevalent and many South Africans feel resentful of immigrants who are seen to be depriving the native population of jobs, a feeling which has been given credibility by the fact that many South African employers have employed migrants from other countries for lower pay than South African citizens, especially in the construction, tourism, agriculture and domestic service industries. Illegal immigrants are also heavily involved in informal trading. However, many immigrants to South Africa continue to live in poor conditions, and the South African immigration policy has become increasingly restrictive since 1994.

=== Trade unions ===
Since 2007 the South African unions representing public sector workers recurrently went on strike, demanding pay rises significantly above inflation, in a practice that some experts argue is suppressing job growth, harming millions of South Africans who are out of a job.

In August and September 2010, South African unions organised a crippling four-week national strike involving 1.3 million public sector workers, demanding an 8.6% wage increase. The strike ended after the government had raised its 5.2% wage increase to 7.5%. The deal swelled state spending by about 1%.

Protesters sought to block hospitals, and South African media have reported numerous acts of violence against health and education staff who insisted on going to work. Volunteers and army medics were called in to help at hospitals, and some patients were moved to private medical facilities.

There is a persistent wage differential between unionised and non-unionised workers in South Africa, suggesting that unions are keeping wages higher for their members, thereby posing additional challenges to the unemployment problem.

In July 2014, amidst a national strike by 220,000 metalworkers, General Motors temporarily shut down its vehicle assembly plant, frustrating its plans to build 50,000 cars a year in the country. "The ongoing labour disruptions are harming the South African economy and are affecting the country's image around the globe," the company said in a statement at the time.

=== Black Economic Empowerment ===
The end of apartheid in 1994 left behind a skewed racial economic hierarchy that placed minority whites at the top. Since then, the African National Congress government created the Black Economic Empowerment (BEE) policy, designed to increase the participation of blacks, Coloureds, and Indians in the economy.

However, BEE has faced criticism for not doing enough to accomplish this goal and only benefiting a small number of people to a great extent. This was acknowledged in 2010 by Deputy President Kgalema Motlanthe, at the first meeting of the BEE Advisory Council, when he said, "The story of black economic empowerment in the last 15 years has been a story dominated by a few individuals benefiting a lot." A 2010 report from the OECD concluded that the "relative improvement in poverty levels," since the end of apartheid, has actually been driven by social assistance grants and not the labour market.

As of 2014, roughly ten percent of the Top 100 companies on the Johannesburg Stock Exchange were directly held by black investors through Black Economic Empowerment schemes. Black Economic Empowerment policies have been credited with creating a class of Black South Africans with a level of wealth on the same order of magnitude as very rich White South Africans.

Black Economic Empowerment—its purpose the "economic empowerment of all black people, including women, workers, youth, people with disabilities and people living in rural areas"—requires the Minister of Trade and Industry to develop and publish Codes of Good Practice, aimed at setting guidelines for the process of BEE in the whole economy. A scorecard is used by the department to measure compliance with the BEE requirements, and is used for public procurement, public-private partnerships, sale of state-owned enterprises, when licences are applied for, and for any other relevant economic activity.

The government's Black Economic Empowerment policies have drawn criticism from the Development Bank of Southern Africa for focusing "almost exclusively on promoting individual ownership by black people (which) does little to address broader economic disparities, though the rich may become more diverse." The System has also been criticised for placing lesser educated people in more important positions in the workplace and their failure to perform to the standards required has had an immense impact on the economy.

Another criticism also includes that the system goes against the constitution's preaching of equality by having preference over people, not on merit, but for their skin colour and is considered the opposite of what many people fought for during the Apartheid era. Official affirmative action policies have seen a rise in black economic wealth and an emerging black middle class.

An increasing number of black candidates who are supposed to be beneficiaries of affirmative action are dissociating themselves from it, largely because of the perception that the appointments are not based on merit. The policy has also been criticised for having a negative impact on employment levels as it is viewed as being more of an additional burden for employees than as a transformative agent for the unemployed. Particularity in an economy where a major cause of inequality has been a growing disparity of income within the majority black population divided along lines of employment.

In his book The New Black Middle Class in South Africa (2016), South African sociologist Roger Southall traces BEE to a negotiated transition in which white-controlled conglomerates exchanged corporate access for political stability with the incoming ANC, and argues that the policy has functioned less as a mechanism of broad redistribution than as a deliberate driver of class formation. He notes that despite the shift to Broad-Based BEE, ownership of most large and medium-sized firms has remained overwhelmingly white, while a small but enormously wealthy black corporate elite has emerged whose position is closely tied to, and dependent upon, the ANC party-state.

=== Gender Equality ===
South Africans in general, regardless of race, hold what would be considered "traditional" stances on gender roles for men and women. The majority of the workforce is composed of males, while the majority of women do not participate. Additionally, females face a problem in terms of earnings, with 77% of women earning the same as their male counterparts. However, more women are becoming part of the agricultural workforce (55%) as of 2012, marking a move towards modernisation for women's participation in the economy.

South African legislation is strongly geared to promoting gender equality in the workplace. This is characterised by several comprehensive government programs and organisations that provide resources and services to females, both adult and adolescent. Such initiatives include the Employment Equity Act, No. 55 of 1988 (aimed at promoting women's participation in mainly private sector jobs). UNFPA South Africa is one such promoter of these policies and programs. Internally, the South African government has founded the Commission for Gender Equality. The commissions main focus is on securing adequate education and job training for women who are disenfranchised or otherwise at a disadvantage when attempting to enter the workforce.

Not uncommon in Africa, gender equality seems to be a very cogent problem in the South African workforce. According to Bain & Company, around 31% of companies have no form of female leadership, either in management or executive positions. 22% of board directors are women, however, only 7% were designated as "executives", lower than the global average of 12%. Additionally, the eNPS (Employee Net Promoter Score) for women is a net negative (- 4) as compared to men (8), according to a survey conducted of 1000 participants. This indicated a low level of actual economic promotion for women, despite public and international initiative towards the contrary.

== Income levels ==
Annual per capita personal income by race group relative to white levels
Year	White	Coloured	Asian	Black
1917	100	22.0	22.1	9.1
1924	100	20.0	19.4	7.9
1936	100	15.6	23.1	7.6
1946	100	16.3	23.0	8.9
1956	100	16.9	21.9	8.6
1960	100	15.9	17.1	8.1
1970	100	17.3	20.2	6.8
1975	100	19.4	25.4	8.6
1980	100	19.1	25.5	8.5
1987	100	20.9	30.2	8.5
1993	100	19.3	42.0	10.9
1995	100	20.0	48.4	13.5
2000	100	23.0	41.0	15.9
2008	100	22.0	60.0	13.0

Gini coefficient by race in 2004
	White	Coloured	Asian	Black	Total
Rural	0.37	0.38	–	0.43	0.51
Urban	0.36	0.45	0.43	0.53	0.56
Overall	0.36	0.47	0.43	0.51	0.59

South Africa has extreme differences in incomes and wealth. The good level of economic growth in the post-apartheid period has led to a measurable decline in income poverty, but inequality has increased.

The high level of overall income inequality has further accentuated: the country's Gini coefficient increased by four percentage points, from 0.66 to 0.70, between 1993 and 2008, and income has become increasingly concentrated in the top decile. Inequality between urban and rural areas is changing: while rural poverty rates remain substantially higher than those in urban areas, urban poverty rates are rising and rural rates seem to be falling.

While between-race inequality is slowly falling, an increase in intra-race inequality is preventing the aggregate measures from declining. Despite that, between-race inequality remains a central issue: real incomes have been rising for all groups, but many blacks in the country still live in poverty. At any poverty line, blacks are very much poorer than coloureds, who are very much poorer than Indians, who are poorer than whites. In 2002, according to one estimate, 62% of Black Africans, 29% of Coloureds, 11% of Asians, and 4% of Whites lived in poverty.

The mean per-capita income has risen from R10,741 in 1993 to R24,409 in 2008, but these figures hide large differences in household welfare, both within and across population groups: the average Black income increased from R6,018 in 1993 to R9,718 in 2008; for Coloured households, the increase was from R7,498 to R25,269; for Whites, the increase was from R29,372 to R110,195.

While mean income rose about 130% from 1993 to 2008, the median income rose just 15% over the same period, from R4,444 to R5,096, indicating that the increases are being driven by a small number of very large incomes, especially for Whites.

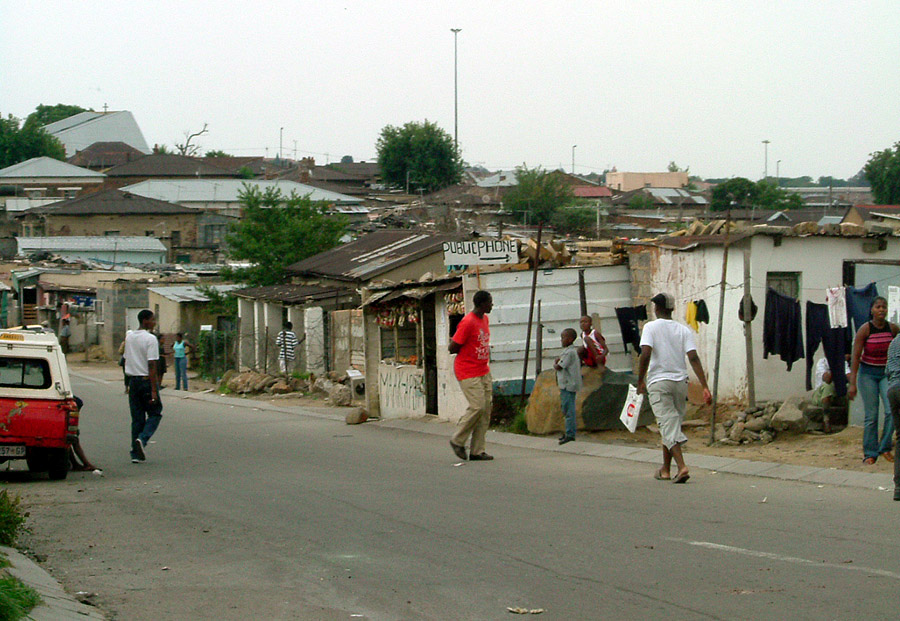
A view of Soweto, a township in Johannesburg, South Africa

In 2000 the average white household was earning six times more than the average black household. In 2004, 29.8% of all households had an income (at constant 2001 prices) of less than R9,600 per annum, while 10.3% of all households enjoyed an annual income (at constant 2001 prices) of more than R153,601 per annum.

One study using calculations based on National Income Dynamics Study (NIDS) data suggests that 47% of South Africans live below the poverty line: 56% of blacks live in poverty compared to 2% of whites, using an arbitrary income poverty line of R502 per capita. Although, it should also be noted that black South Africans make up the majority of the population at 79.2% while white South Africans make up only 8.9% of the population according to the Statistics South Africa census released in 2011.

The United Nations Development Program's Human Development Index (HDI) ranked South Africa 110 out of 169 countries in 2010. The report notes, however, that the region's assessment has improved slowly since 1980. The HDI includes a Human Poverty Index (HPI-1), which ranked South Africa 85 out of 135 countries.

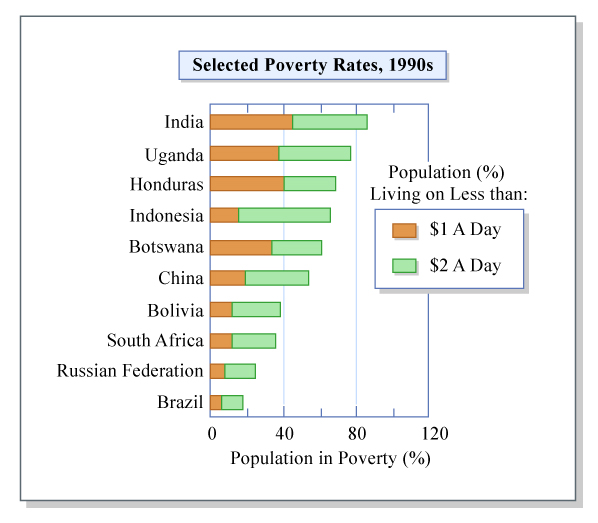
Graph of selected poverty rates in the 1990s.

The number of South Africans living below the poverty line, identified according to Apartheid-era social categories, was calculated in one study as 56% "black", 27% "coloured", 9% "Indian", and 2% "white". In the past inequality in South Africa was largely defined along race lines, but it has become increasingly defined by inequality within population groups as the gap between rich and poor within each group has increased substantially.

The Organisation for Economic Co-operation and Development proposals for addressing income inequality included: encouraging more saving and investment; a liberalisation of product-market regulation; easier access to credit for small businesses; greater co-ordination in wage bargaining; and measures to tackle the high level of youth unemployment. Some proposals have included wage subsidies for people being trained, a minimum wage differentiated by age, and extended periods of probation for young workers. In post-Apartheid South Africa, only Asians have made significant strides in closing the income gap with Whites; while Coloured and Black South Africans have had much more muted progress.

A 2011 study published by the University of Cape Town about the richest 10% found that nearly 40% are black, where this group had once been almost exclusively white. While only 29% of the absolute wealthiest South Africans are black, this jumps to 50% among the "entry-level" rich (defined as earning more than $4,000 per month). Factors that were found to be common among those in the entry-level rich group include being young, entrepreneurial and having some post-secondary education.

According to one estimate, 10.4% of South Africans belonged to the "higher middle class" in 2004, defined as having a per capita income of over R40,000 (in 2000 Rand).

== Government finances ==
=== Taxes and transfers ===
==== Taxation ====
The top rate of personal income tax rate in South Africa is 45%; the corporate tax rate is 27%. Other taxes include a value-added tax and a capital gains tax, with the overall tax burden amounting to 23.4% of total domestic income.

=== Social benefits and welfare ===
South Africa has about three times as many recipients of social benefits as it has income tax-payers, an extremely high ratio by international standards. After 1994 resources have been rapidly reallocated to black households: while approximately 40% of aggregate social spending was directed to whites and 43% to blacks in the mid-1980s, by the late 1990s fully 80% of total social spending was assigned to blacks and less than 10% to whites. At present, blacks contribute some 50% of total government transfers, while receiving roughly 80%.

The Unemployment Insurance Fund is financed out of premiums, contributions and benefits depend on earnings, and focuses on insuring workers against the risk of income loss.

==== Social assistance grants ====
Social assistance grants are non-contributory, income-tested benefits provided by the state to the poor, and are financed out of general tax revenues without any links between contributions and benefits. They are provided in the form of: grants for older persons; disability grants; war veterans grants; care dependency grants; foster child grants; child support grants; grant-in-aid; social relief of distress.

The state old age pension, received by over 80% of the elderly, is a non-contributory pension and pays more than twice median per capita Black income, thus representing an important source of income for a third of all Black households in the country. It pays a maximum of R1,780 (as of July 2019) to people who reach pension age without access to private pensions.

The child support grant provides R420 per month, per child (as of July 2019) for every child in the household younger than 18, and benefited 9.1 million children by April 2009.

The war veterans grant is provided to former soldiers who fought in the Second World War or the Korean War, and pays a maximum amount of R1,800 per month (as of July 2019).

== Comparison with other emerging markets ==
According to a December 2010 article by the South African Government Communication and Information System's now-defunct BuaNews news service, South Africa was said to compare well to other emerging markets on affordability and availability of capital, financial market sophistication, business tax rates, and infrastructure, but to fare poorly on the cost and availability of labour, education, and the use of technology and innovation. South Africa does have expertise in the Space industry, and students learning more through the South African SEDS. With the correct government support, South Africa can increase the jobs in the manufacturing, testing, and analysis sectors of the growing Space industry.

Released in early December 2010 and no longer available online, the survey by Brazil's National Confederation of Industry, "Competitividade Brasil 2010: Comparaçao com Paises Selecionados", (Competition Brazil: A comparison with selected countries), found South Africa to have the second most sophisticated financial market and the second-lowest effective business tax rate (business taxes as a percentage of company profits), out of 14 surveyed countries.

The country was also ranked fourth for ease of accessing capital, fourth for cost of capital, sixth for its transport infrastructure (at the time considered better than that of China, India, Mexico, Brazil and Poland, but behind that of Korea and Chile), and seventh for foreign direct investment as a percentage of GDP: in 2008 it was over 3% of the GDP.

Nevertheless, South Africa is falling behind other emerging markets, such as India and China, owing to several factors: the country is relatively small, without the advantage of a huge domestic customer base; it has had for decades an unusually low rate of saving and investment, partly because of low disposable income; an inadequate education system results in an acute shortage of skilled manpower; a strong and volatile currency deters investors and makes its exports less competitive; the infrastructure, though far better than in the rest of Africa, suffers from severe bottlenecks, including scheduled power shortages, and urgently needs upgrading.

In 2011, after a year of observer status, South Africa officially joined the BRICS group of now-five emerging-market nations at the summit held in Sanya, Hainan, China.

== See also ==
- Economy of Johannesburg
- List of companies of South Africa
- List of largest companies in South Africa
- List of South African provinces by GDP
- List of South Africans by net worth
- State-owned enterprises of South Africa
- Corruption in South Africa
- Science and technology in South Africa
- South African company law
- Copyright law of South Africa
- South African patent system
- Credit agreements in South Africa
- South Africa and the World Bank
- Consumer price index in South Africa
- White monopoly capital
- Tenderpreneur
- National Development Plan 2030
- Growth, Employment and Redistribution
- United Nations Economic Commission for Africa
- Economy of Africa
