= South Africa and the World Bank =

Relations between the state of South Africa and the World Bank

South Africa first formed a formal relationship with the World Bank on Dec 27, 1945 when it joined the International Bank for Reconstruction and Development, the first of the five financial pillars that compose the World Bank. Although South Africa was a founding member of the World Bank, its first loan agreement wasn’t signed until 1951, in the amount of $20,000,000. Since then, over 4.15 billion dollars has been approved for disbursement to South Africa from the World Bank in the form of loans to support a broad spectrum of development projects, with the majority of this funding currently allocated for projects in energy and resource extraction. South Africa’s voting power does not exceed 1% of the total voting power across the four composite institutions with voting authority that make up the World Bank Group.

== Systematic country diagnostic ==
The World Bank’s SCD is a report prepared by the World Bank Group and a target country’s national authorities to identify critical challenges and priorities relevant to the national development goals that are consistent with the World Bank objectives of ending poverty and building shared prosperity. The most recent report on South Africa identified five fundamental causes associated with poverty and inequality in the country: insufficient skills related to education and vocational training, skewed asset bases for the poor and weak property rights that deter investors, low competition and low integration into global and regional value chains, limited connectivity and inadequate services in historically disadvantaged settlements, and climate shocks that disrupt the economy and availability of jobs.

== Current projects ==
Since joining the World Bank in 1945, South Africa has accepted fifteen separate loans from the World Bank to fund a broad spectrum of national development projects ranging from energy, agriculture, finance, trade, sanitation, and more. Of those 15 loans, all but two have been closed, with remaining repayments still outstanding for nearly 5 billion USD in original principal. The remaining loans are primarily directed towards power supply and energy security to support economic growth targets and support South Africa's long term carbon mitigation strategy. The nationally owned power utility Eskom is responsible for this infrastructural development and has received the majority of the disbursements from active project loans.

== See also ==
- Economy of South Africa
- South African Reserve Bank
- Wealth inequality in South Africa
