= Consumer price index in South Africa =

Official measure of inflation in South Africa

The consumer price index (CPI) is the official measure of inflation in South Africa, compiled and published by Statistics South Africa (Stats SA). It is a key economic indicator used by the South African Reserve Bank (SARB) for its inflation targeting policy.

The SARB's official target range for headline inflation is 3% to 6%. Since 2017, the bank has focused on anchoring inflation expectations at the 4.5% midpoint of this range.

== Methodology and Basket Updates ==
The CPI basket and its weightings are periodically updated to reflect changes in household spending patterns. These updates ensure the index remains a relevant measure of consumer inflation.

=== 2009 Changes ===
In January 2009, Stats SA changed the naming and composition of headline CPI measures. This revision effectively replaced the CPIX (CPI excluding mortgage costs) as the primary measure for government inflation targeting. While new indices were introduced, the previous baseline measures continued to be published to support existing legal agreements that referenced them.

=== 2017 Rebasing ===
In February 2017, Stats SA updated the CPI basket and weights using data from the 2014/15 Living Conditions Survey (LCS). This marked a methodological shift from the previously used Income and Expenditure Survey (IES). The LCS was designed to survey household expenditure while also capturing data on poverty levels and trends.

=== 2019–2022 Updates ===
In 2019, the CPI series was aligned with the international Classification of Individual Consumption by Purpose (COICOP), replacing the older International Trade Classification (ITC) system to improve international comparability.

A full basket update was delayed due to budgetary constraints at Stats SA. However, a partial update to weights was completed in 2022, using sources and methods consistent with international best practices.

=== 2025 Rebasing ===
A major update to the CPI basket was introduced in 2025, based on data from the 2022/23 Income and Expenditure Survey, which interviewed approximately 32,000 households. This update saw significant changes in the weights of major spending categories and adjustments to the items in the basket.

Key changes included:

- Items added: Rosé wine, snuff, and e-cigarette refills.
- Items removed: Frozen potato chips and condensed milk.
- Weight adjustments:
  - Food and non-alcoholic beverages increased to 18.2% (from 17.1%).
  - Housing and utilities decreased to 24.1% (from 24.5%).
  - Transport decreased to 13.9% (from 14.4%).
- New category: Insurance and financial services was established as a separate top-level category with a weight of 10.4%.

== Measured Variants ==
Stats SA compiles several variants of the CPI to provide a more detailed view of inflation dynamics.

=== Headline CPI ===
The Headline CPI, also known as the All Items index, is the most comprehensive measure, encompassing a wide basket of consumer goods and services.

=== Core Index ===
The Core index excludes items with particularly volatile prices to provide a sense of underlying inflation. These exclusions include fresh and frozen foods (due to climate and seasonal volatility), overdrafts and personal loans, Value Added Tax (VAT), and property taxes.

=== Supercore Inflation ===
In 2024, the South African Reserve Bank introduced a "supercore" inflation measure for analytical purposes. This index is composed of components from the core CPI that are considered most responsive to general economic conditions, as measured by the output gap. It is used to gauge demand-driven inflationary pressures.

=== Historical Variants ===
- CPIX: This index, which excluded mortgage interest costs from the headline CPI, was used as the official inflation target until it was replaced in 2009.

== Inflation Targeting Framework ==
The CPI is the central tool for South Africa's inflation targeting policy, managed by the South African Reserve Bank.

In late 2017, the SARB began to actively target the 4.5% midpoint of its 3%–6% inflation target range to better anchor inflation expectations. In 2022, the SARB also reformed its monetary policy implementation framework, shifting from a "shortage system" to a "tiered floor system" where it supplies a surplus of reserves to the market, based on a review of global central banking practices.

There has been discussion about lowering the inflation target. According to economic analysis, while the SARB aims to eventually lower the target to around 3%, public inflation expectations are not yet aligned with this goal. As of April 2025, annual CPI inflation was 2.8%, marking the second consecutive month it fell below the SARB's target range.

== Quality Assurance and International Standards ==
The quality of South Africa's CPI is regularly assessed against international standards.

A 2011 peer review by international expert David Fenwick concluded that the CPI was "generally of a good quality and adheres to many of the relevant international standards." In 2014, the CPI was the first Stats SA product assessed against the South African Statistical Quality Assessment Framework (SASQAF), receiving a strong score of 3.6 out of 4, affirming its compliance with a wide range of quality criteria.

During the COVID-19 pandemic in 2020, Stats SA adapted its data collection methods by using the online stores of sampled retailers and increasing the frequency of price collection for essential items.

Looking forward, Stats SA has outlined a digital transformation initiative that includes researching the use of artificial intelligence, web-based data collection, and big data sources for producing official statistics.

== See also ==
- Consumer price index by country
- Economy of South Africa, for annual inflation figures
