= The New Black Middle Class in South Africa =

2016 book by Roger Southall

- Cover
- Author: Roger Southall
- Language: English
- Subject: The sociology of South Africa, class, and post-apartheid politics
- Publisher: Jacana Media (southern Africa); James Currey / Boydell & Brewer (rest of world)
- Publication date: 2016
- Publication place: South Africa, United Kingdom
- Media type: Print (hardback and paperback)
- Pages: 296
- ISBN: 978-1-84701-143-5

The New Black Middle Class in South Africa is a 2016 book by sociologist Roger Southall. His vantage point, he states, is that of a middle class academic but white, with all the strengths and weaknesses that implies. He positions the book as a successor in spirit to Leo Kuper's An African Bourgeoisie (1965). The work was published jointly by Jacana Media in South Africa and James Currey in the United Kingdom.

Southall documents the formation, size, occupational structure, and political role of the black middle class in South Africa from the Union of 1910 to the post-apartheid period. Using labour-market data, government records, and the secondary literature, he identifies the African National Congress, operating as a "party-state", as the principal force behind the rise of the new black middle class, through equity employment, Black Economic Empowerment, public-sector expansion, and the deployment of cadres. Southall sees the resulting class as both an outcome of and a precondition for the consolidation of South African democracy.

== Synopsis ==
Southall's subject is the black middle class in post-apartheid South Africa: how it has formed, what shape it takes, and what political role it plays. After an extended critique of the Marxist and Weberian traditions, he defines class as a historical relationship rather than a fixed structure, organised around occupational hierarchies and proximity to state and capital. He limits the empirical focus to the "black African" middle class (a disputed but minority segment of the population) while noting the parallel histories of Coloured and Indian middle strata, and distinguishes the "new" post-1994 black middle class, whose members had to "start from scratch", from an "old" black middle class formed within the narrow openings of the colonial and apartheid orders.

In Southall's account, the period from the Union of South Africa in 1910 to the democratic transition of 1994 saw the slow emergence of an African middle class under settler colonialism and apartheid: mission education, clerical and teaching work, and a thin layer of independent professionals, all squeezed by influx control, Bantu Education, and racial restrictions on enterprise. He argues that white settler-instigated capitalism "left little room for a black middle class" and worked against its growth, even as missionaries cultivated an early African elite.

Labour force and household survey data record the post-apartheid expansion of the black middle class in size, shape, and structure, a development Southall attributes to the African National Congress operating as a "party-state". Equity employment, Black Economic Empowerment, the deployment of cadres into strategic sectors, and the rapid growth of public-sector employment (the public service has more than doubled since 1994, making the state the country's largest employer) form what he calls a "necessary accompaniment" to the consolidation of ANC power. State and private capital, he writes, are "locked in a contradictory relationship", each dependent on and distrustful of the other; outsourcing and abandoned privatisations became vehicles for party patronage.

In the education chapter, Southall treats schooling and access to higher education as both the principal routes of upward mobility and reproducers of inequality, with unequal outcomes by quality and region preserving privilege under a deracialised system. The chapter on work disaggregates the black middle class into state managers, corporate managers, professionals, semi-professionals, and white-collar workers; the largest segment is semi-professionals (teachers, nurses, and similar), and Southall observes that the typical member of the black middle class is "an overworked and undertrained schoolteacher" rather than a "black diamond". The social-world chapter sets the "black diamonds" stereotype against the everyday reality of indebted, family-supporting households, and takes up the "black tax" by which middle-class earners sustain extended kin, the migration of black families into former white suburbs, and the appeal of Pentecostal and charismatic churches. The politics chapter tests three propositions: that the black middle class was a force for democracy before 1994; that it is both the offspring of and the principal proponent of ANC patronage; and that its heterogeneity matters for the consolidation of democratic pluralism. Southall declines a single verdict, believing that the "progressive ethos of the black middle class is not simply a given of social existence and ought to be questioned".

In an afterword, Southall compares South Africa with other African countries such as Nigeria, Kenya, and Ghana, asking to what extent it is sui generis. The voices of black middle-class South Africans themselves are scarce in the book, which works from labour-market data, public records, and the existing literature.

== Critics ==
Rebecca Simson welcomed the book as a corrective to a debate dominated by marketing reports and journalism, and credited Southall with disaggregating the black middle class by occupation rather than income or consumption. The politics chapter was for her the most provocative: Southall stopped short of declaring the middle class either a democratising or a conservative force, a restraint she found warranted by the political flux of the Zuma years.

Lena Giesbert and Simone Schotte called the book a substantive corrective to consumption-driven accounts, but raised three reservations: the near-absence of middle-class South African voices; a tendency to define class through occupational categories while underplaying the lived experience of mobility, precarity, and aspiration; and uneven empirical depth between the historical and contemporary chapters. Despite these reservations, they acknowledged that the book would become a standard reference.

Wamuwi Mbao read the book for what it said about South Africa's literary and cultural moment, and judged it important if at times uncongenial. His main criticism was the absence of cultural texture: the literature, music, and self-fashioning through which middle-class identity is negotiated in practice. He conceded this as a question for another book, and strongly recommended the volume to scholars of contemporary South African society.

Kwaku Nti called the work an "important and timely intervention" that filled a conspicuous gap in Africanist scholarship. He commended Southall for his handling of the conceptual literature, for the historical depth of the early chapters, and for his sustained attention to the state's role in producing the new middle class. Nti suggested that the chapter on education could have done more with the politics of language and curriculum, but concluded that the book was a major addition to the field and would become a fixture on syllabi.

For Anthony Lemon, the book's strength was its geographical and historical sweep: Southall's mapping of suburbanisation and the spatial legacies of apartheid in the contemporary housing market. He commended the chapter on work for its categorical clarity and judged the discussion of the "black tax" illuminating. Lemon expressed mild scepticism about some of Southall's quantitative claims, given the well-known limitations of South African class data, but described the book as authoritative and unlikely to be superseded for some time.

Ronnie Donaldson saw the book as advancing scholarship on post-apartheid suburbanisation, gated estates, and the racial reconfiguration of former white neighbourhoods. He welcomed Southall's attention to debt, religion, and the family economy. Donaldson registered some repetition between chapters and a reliance on secondary literature where ethnographic material would have strengthened the argument, but called the book essential reading for geographers and urbanists as well as sociologists.

In his review, Ibrahim Abraham took the book's two main claims to be its framing of the ANC as a "party-state" and its case that state employment was central to black class formation. His main criticism was Southall's treatment of "neo-liberalism": he read it as rhetorical and called for a sharper challenge to the loose use of the term in South African scholarship. The discussion of indebtedness and the "black tax" struck him as the book's most original passage, and he described the volume as "a very important and timely study" likely to become a key reference.

Busisiwe Khaba called the chapter on the politics of the black middle class the book's strongest for its account of how patronage, voting behaviour, and democratic consolidation interact. On gender, she wanted more given the feminisation of certain middle-class occupations, but described the book as essential reading for students of South African politics.

For Mehita Iqani and Gugulethu Yika, the book was strong on the economic and occupational makeup of the black middle class but light on its cultural side: television, advertising, fashion, and social media, through which the middle class makes itself visible. They recommended reading it alongside work on media and consumer culture, not in place of it.

Michael MacDonald argued that Southall's "party-state" framing had implications beyond South Africa for the study of post-liberation regimes. He took the discussion of Black Economic Empowerment and cadre deployment as the book's strongest material, and approved the politics chapter's refusal to assign the black middle class a single democratic disposition. His main criticism was the comparative African afterword, shorter and more tentative than the rest of the book demanded.

Garth le Pere called the book "a scholarly masterpiece in its disciplinary eclecticism" and a worthy successor to Leo Kuper's An African Bourgeoisie. He admired the historical reach, Southall's reflections on his own position, the sequencing of definition, history, structure, and theme, and the argument that the black middle class operates within a "contradictory relationship" between state and capital.

In a joint review, Lesego Linda Plank, Grace Khunou and Kris Marsh wanted closer engagement with intra-class differentiation by gender, age, and family form, arguing that the reliance on aggregate occupational data flattened the experiential and biographical contours of the class. Despite these criticisms, they called the book an important addition to the sociology of post-apartheid South Africa.

In his review of the work in African Affairs, Ján Michalko called the book a major work and named the politics chapter its most ambitious section. His main reservations were the limited attention to organised labour and to the black middle class outside the major metropolitan areas, but he predicted the book would define the field for some years.
