= Two Rivers mine =

Platinum mine in Steelpoort, Limpopo, South Africa

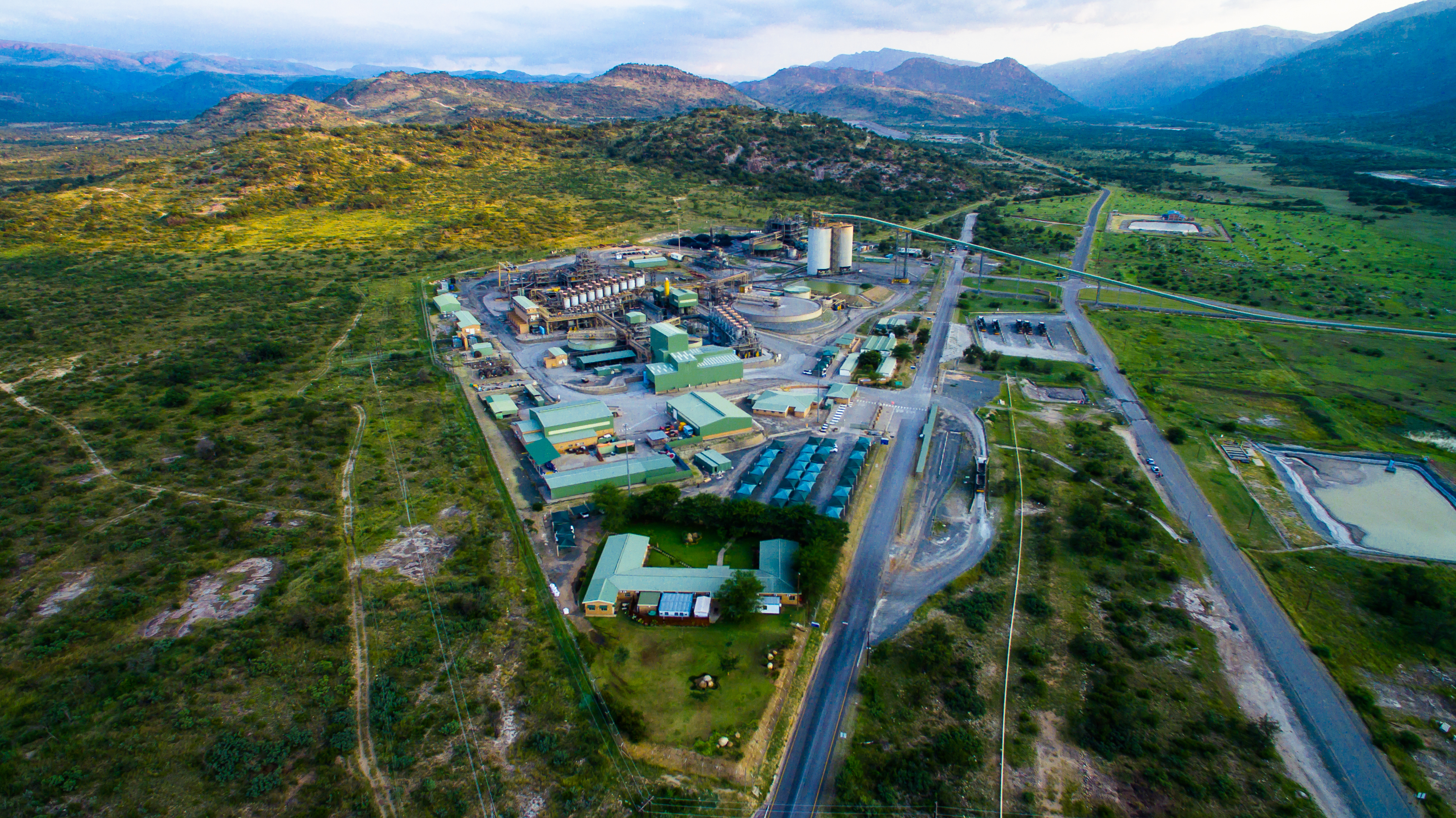
- Location: Steelpoort, Limpopo, South Africa
- Products: platinum, palladium, rhodium, ruthenium, gold
- Company: African Rainbow Minerals

The Two Rivers mine is a large bord and pillar mine located in the north-eastern part of South Africa in Steelpoort, Limpopo. Two Rivers represents one of the largest platinum reserves in South Africa having estimated reserves of 100 million tonnes of ore grading 1.8 gr/t platinum, 1.07 gr/t palladium and minor grades of gold, rhodium, ruthenium and iridium. The mine has reserves of 5.76 million oz of platinum and 3.2 million oz of palladium and produces around 150,000 oz of platinum/year and 90,000 oz of palladium/year.
