= Eswatini–South Africa border =

International border

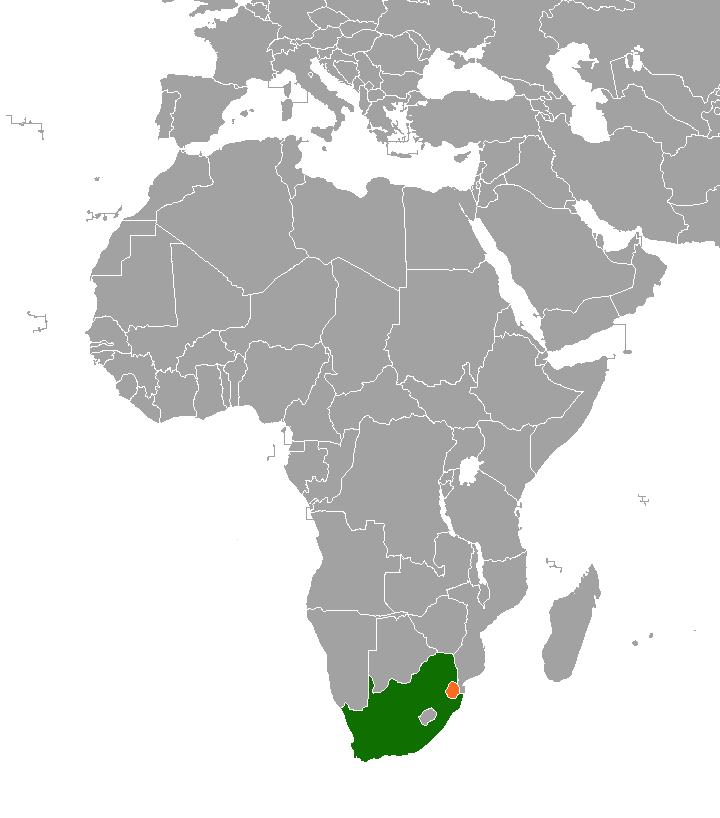
South Africa (green) and Eswatini (orange)

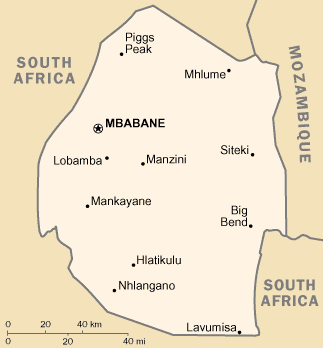
Eswatini is almost entirely surrounded by South Africa

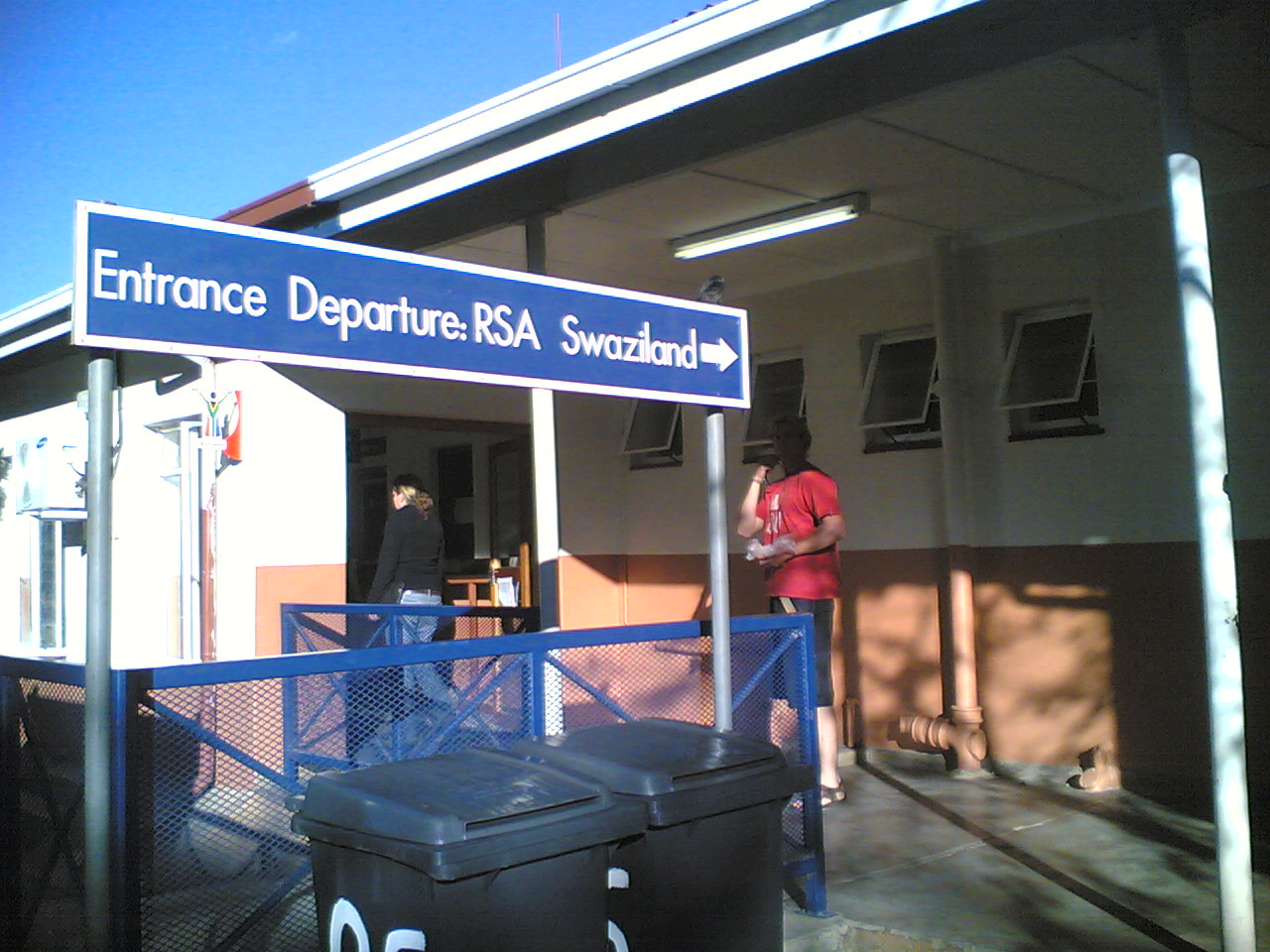
Border post

The border between Eswatini and South Africa is 430 kilometres (267 mi) long; South Africa surrounds Eswatini to the north, west, south and southeast, with Mozambique bordering it on the northeast.

== Crossings ==
The border crossings are listed from north to south in the table below.

South Africa		Eswatini		Opening hours	Geographical coordinates	Notes
Road	Border post	Road	Border post	Opening hours	Geographical coordinates	Notes
	Bothashoop	MR13	Gege	08:00–16:00	26.9737°S 30.9684°E	
	Emahlathini	MR4	Sicunusa	08:00–18:00	26.8605°S 30.9084°E	
N720	Golela	MR8	Lavumisa	07:00–22:00	27.3172°S 31.8884°E	Durban–Komatipoort railway also crosses here
R570	Jeppes Reef	MR1	Matsamo	07:00–20:00	25.7507°S 31.4676°E	
R40	Josefsdal	MR20	Bulembu	08:00–16:00	25.9446°S 31.1215°E	
R543	Mahamba	MR9	Mahamba	07:00–22:00	27.1055°S 31.0691°E	
R571	Mananga	MR5	Mananga	07:00–18:00	25.9331°S 31.7613°E	Durban–Komatipoort railway also crosses here
R65	Nerston	MR19	Sandlane	08:00–18:00	26.5697°S 30.7918°E	
N17	Oshoek	MR3	Ngwenya	07:00–22:00	26.2125°S 30.9892°E	
	Onverwacht, KwaZulu-Natal	MR21	Salitje	08:00–18:00	27.3162°S 31.6438°E	
	Waverley		Lundzi	08:00–16:00	26.3275°S 30.8885°E	
