= Havelock =

Havelock may refer to:

== People ==
=== As a surname ===
- Havelock-Allan baronets, holders of the baronetcy
- Sir Henry Havelock (1795–1857), British general, active in India
- Lieutenant General Sir Henry Havelock-Allan, 1st Baronet (1830–1897), British General and Member of Parliament (son of Sir Henry Havelock)
- Sir Henry Havelock-Allan, 2nd Baronet (1872–1953), British Liberal Party politician and Member of Parliament
- Sir Anthony Havelock-Allan, 4th Baronet (1904–2003), British film producer
- Sir (Anthony) Mark David Havelock-Allan, 5th Baronet (born 1951—see Havelock-Allan baronets), English Circuit Judge
- Sir Arthur Havelock (1844–1908), Governor of Tasmania, 1901–1904
- Brian Havelock (1942–2025), English motorcycle speedway rider
- Eric A. Havelock (1903–1988), British (later Canadian and American) scholar
- Gary Havelock (born 1968), 1992 World Individual Speedway champion
- Harry Havelock (footballer) (1901–1973), English professional footballer
- John E. Havelock (1932–2021), Alaska Attorney General from 1970 to 1973
- Jon Havelock, Alberta politician
- Sir Thomas Henry Havelock (1877–1968), English applied mathematician
- Tom Havelock, British singer-songwriter
- Wilfrid Havelock (1912–2003), Kenyan politician
- William Havelock (1793–1848), British cavalry officer (brother of Sir Henry Havelock)
- William Henry Havelock (1826–1876), Indian Civil Servant

=== As a given name ===
- Sir Havelock Charles (1858–1934), British doctor and Serjeant Surgeon to King George V
- Havelock Ellis (1859–1939), British physician and psychologist, writer, and social reformer who studied human sexuality
- Sir Havelock Hudson (1862–1944), British Indian Army officer
- Havelock Nelson (1917–1996), Irish composer and conductor
- Havelock Nelson (writer) (born 1964), American music journalist and author
- Havelock Wilson (1859–1929), British trade union leader and Liberal Party politician

== Places ==
=== Australia ===
- Havelock, Victoria, a small town north of Maryborough

=== Canada ===
- Havelock, New Brunswick, an unincorporated community
- Havelock Parish, New Brunswick, a civil parish
- Havelock, Ontario, a village
- Havelock-Belmont-Methuen, Ontario, a township
- Havelock, Quebec, a town
- Havelock, Nova Scotia, an unincorporated community

=== India ===
- Havelock Island, the largest of the islands in Ritchie's Archipelago, Andaman Islands

=== New Zealand ===
- Havelock, New Zealand, a village
- Havelock North, New Zealand, a town

- Havelock North Wanderers, a football team
- Havelock North High School, a high school

=== Singapore ===
- Havelock MRT station
- Havelock Road

=== Sri Lanka ===
- Havelock City, a large residential project
- Havelock Town, a small town/area near the outskirts of Colombo

=== Swaziland ===
- Bulembu (Havelock), a town
- Havelock Asbestos Mine, an abandoned asbestos mine

=== United States ===
- Havelock, Iowa, a city
- Havelock, North Carolina, a city
- Havelock, North Dakota, an unincorporated community
- Havelock Township, Minnesota
- Havelock, Nebraska, a former town/current neighborhood of Lincoln, annexed in 1930

== Fictional characters ==
- Havelock Vetinari, Patrician of Ankh-Morpork in the Discworld novels of Terry Pratchett
- Judy Havelock, a Bond girl in Ian Fleming's short story "For Your Eyes Only"

== Other ==
- Havelok the Dane, a Middle English romance
- Havelock Country Jamboree, country music festival held annually in rural Ontario
- HMS Havelock, several ships of Britain's Royal Navy
- Inverness cape, a cloth cover, also called a 'havelock', reportedly named after Sir Henry Havelock
