= Lebombo cycad =

Lebombo cycad is the common name for two closely related species of cycads native to the Lebombo Mountains:

- Encephalartos lebomboensis
- Encephalartos senticosus
