= Sid Peterson =

American baseball player

- Pitcher
- Born: January 31, 1918; Havelock, North Dakota, U.S.
- Died: August 29, 2001 (aged 83); Wichita Falls, Texas, U.S.
- Batted: Right Threw: Right

MLB debut
- May 4, 1943, for the St. Louis Browns

Last MLB appearance
- May 12, 1943, for the St. Louis Browns

MLB statistics
- Win–loss record: 2–0
- Earned run average: 2.70
- Strikeouts: 0
- Stats at Baseball Reference

Teams
- St. Louis Browns (1943)

Sidney Herbert Peterson (January 31, 1918 – August 29, 2001) was an American Major League Baseball pitcher who played for the St. Louis Browns in 1943.

Peterson is of Danish and Swedish descent and was raised in Mandan, North Dakota where he met his future wife, Kay. He and Kay married in 1938 and had at least two children, Sandra Kay and Billy. While living in North Dakota, he played American Legion baseball and worked at a vocational school.

In 1940, he departed Mandan for Jackson, Mississippi to train at a baseball school. He received his first professional contract with the St. Louis Browns as a result and was sent to play for the Youngstown Browns. He spent the ensuing offseason working at a rubber factory in Youngstown.

Peterson made the roster out of spring training in 1943 but did not make his Major League debut until May 4. He pitched two scoreless innings in relief of Daffy Dean at Sportsman's Park. He made what would be the final outing of his Major League career on May 12. A week later, on May 19, Peterson and Fred Sanford were demoted to the Toledo Mud Hens in order to meet the 25-player roster limit.

Peterson would continue to play in the minor leagues until 1950, his final three seasons spent with the Wichita Falls Spudders. In 1944, after being classified by the Selective Service System as not acceptable for military service, he took the season off from baseball and spent the year working at a factory in Youngstown making equipment for the United States military.

After his playing career ended, he continued residing in Wichita Falls, Texas where he worked for American Motors and his wife worked as a secretary for the local police department.
