= R571 road =

R571 road may refer to:

- R571 road (Ireland)
- R571 road (South Africa)
