= Mgazini =

Town in southwest Eswatini

Coordinates: 26.796°S 30.949°E

Mgazini is a town in southwest Eswatini. It is located close to the South African border, between the towns of Mankayane and Sicunusa. It has an elevation of 1,197 meters. Mgazini's land is mostly flat and muddy. The majority of its 4,000 inhabitants are mostly farmers, according to Eswatini's 2002 National Census. There are two primary schools, one secondary school, one hospital, and one bank.
