= Driekoppies Dam =

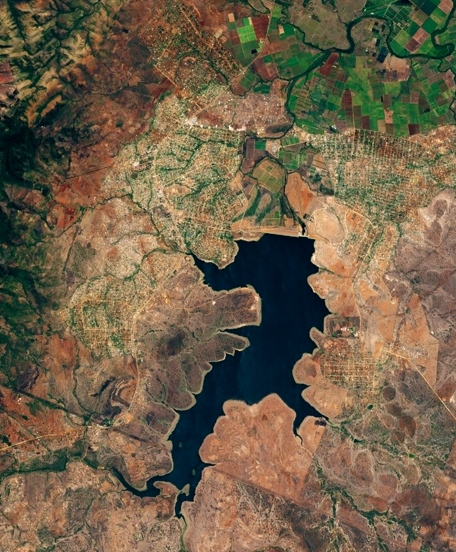
- The reservoir and Schoemansdal imaged by Sentinel-2
- Interactive map of Driekoppies Dam
- Official name: Driekoppies Dam
- Location: South Africa
- Coordinates: 25°43′0″S 31°32′25″E
- Opening date: 1998
- Operator: Department of Water Affairs

Dam and spillways
- Type of dam: gravity, earth-fill
- Impounds: Lomati River
- Height: 50 m
- Length: 2340 m

Reservoir
- Creates: Lake Matsamo
- Total capacity: 251 000 000 m^{3}
- Surface area: 1870 ha

Driekoppies Dam is a gravity/earth-fill type dam on the Lomati River, near Malelane, Mpumalanga, South Africa. It was established in 1998 and its primary purpose is for irrigation.

== See also ==
- List of reservoirs and dams in South Africa
- List of rivers of South Africa
