= Schoemansdal =

Schoemansdal may refer to:

- Schoemansdal, Limpopo, South Africa (formerly called Oude Dorp and Zoutpansbergdorp)
- Schoemansdal, Mpumalanga, South Africa
