= Waverley, Mpumalanga =

Waverley in Mpumalanga is a small border crossing between South Africa and Eswatini. The Eswatini side of the border post is known as Lundzi. The border is open between 08:00 and 16:00.

	South Africa	Eswatini
Name	Waverley	Lundzi
Province	Mpumalanga	
GPS Coordinates	26.3275°S 30.8885°E	26.3263°S 30.8857°E
Telephone number	+27 (0) 17 819 5763	
Fax number	+27 (0) 17 819 3481	
Business hours	08:00 - 16:00	08:00 - 16:00
