= Jeppes Reef =

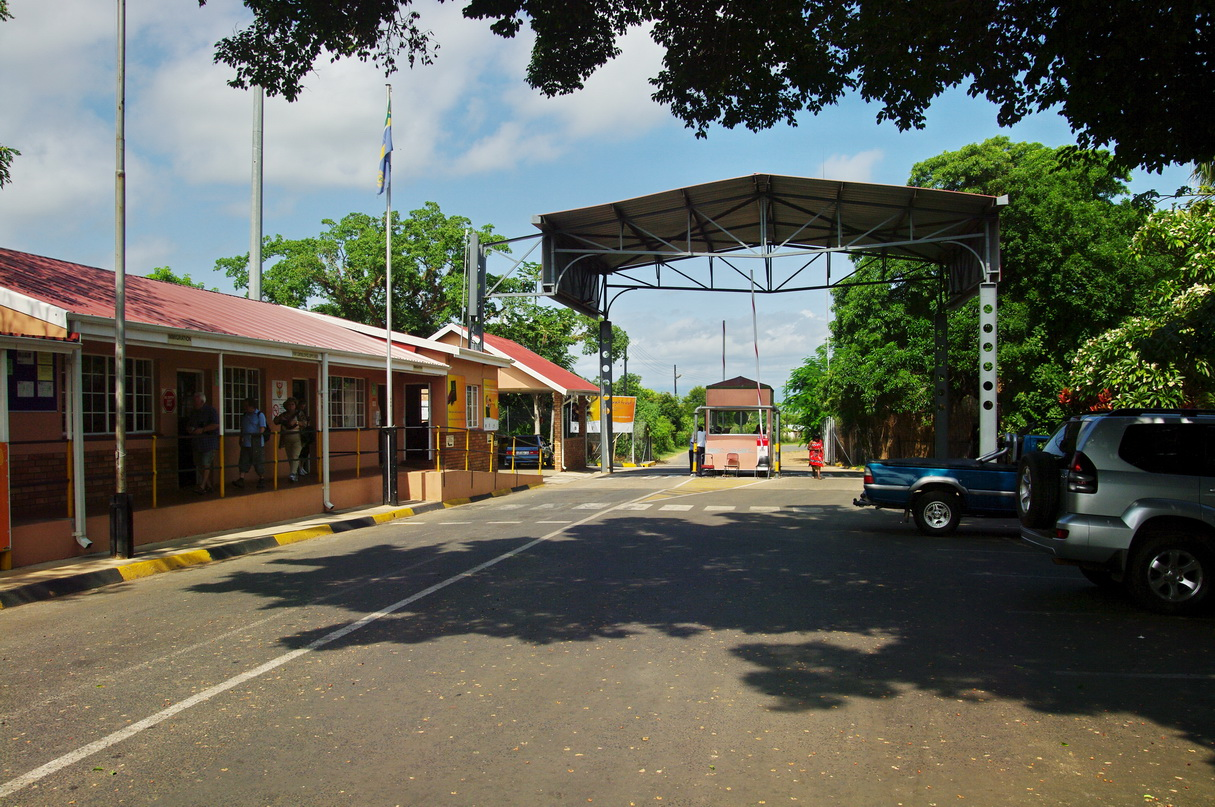

- Location within Mpumalanga Location within South Africa
- Coordinates: 25.720°S 31.477°E
- Country: South Africa
- Province: Mpumalanga
- District: Ehlanzeni
- Municipality: Nkomazi

Area
  - Total: 7.46 km^{2} (2.88 sq mi)

Population (2011)
  - Total: 12,589
  - Density: 1,690/km^{2} (4,370/sq mi)

Racial makeup (2011)
  - Black African: 99.7%
  - Coloured: 0.2%
  - Indian/Asian: 0.1%

First languages (2011)
  - SiSwati: 96.5%
  - Other: 3.5%
- Time zone: UTC+2 (SAST)

Jeppes Reef, is a small rural village on the R570 road in Ehlanzeni District Municipality in the Mpumalanga province of South Africa, 25 kilometres (16 mi) south-southeast of Kaapmuiden, and just over 2 kilometres (1.2 mi) from the border with Eswatini. It is just south of Schoemansdal.

A border control post operates between 07:00 and 20:00 between the two countries. The Eswatini side of the Matsamo border post is known as Hlohlo.

	South Africa	Eswatini
Region	Mpumalanga	
Nearest town	Malalane	
Road	R570	MR1
GPS Coordinates	25.7507°S 31.4676°E	25.7507°S 31.4676°E
Telephone number	+27 (0) 13 781 0382	
Fax number	+27 (0) 13 781 0383	
Business hours	07:00 - 20:00	07:00 - 20:00
