= Havelock Asbestos Mine =

Asbestos mine in Eswatini

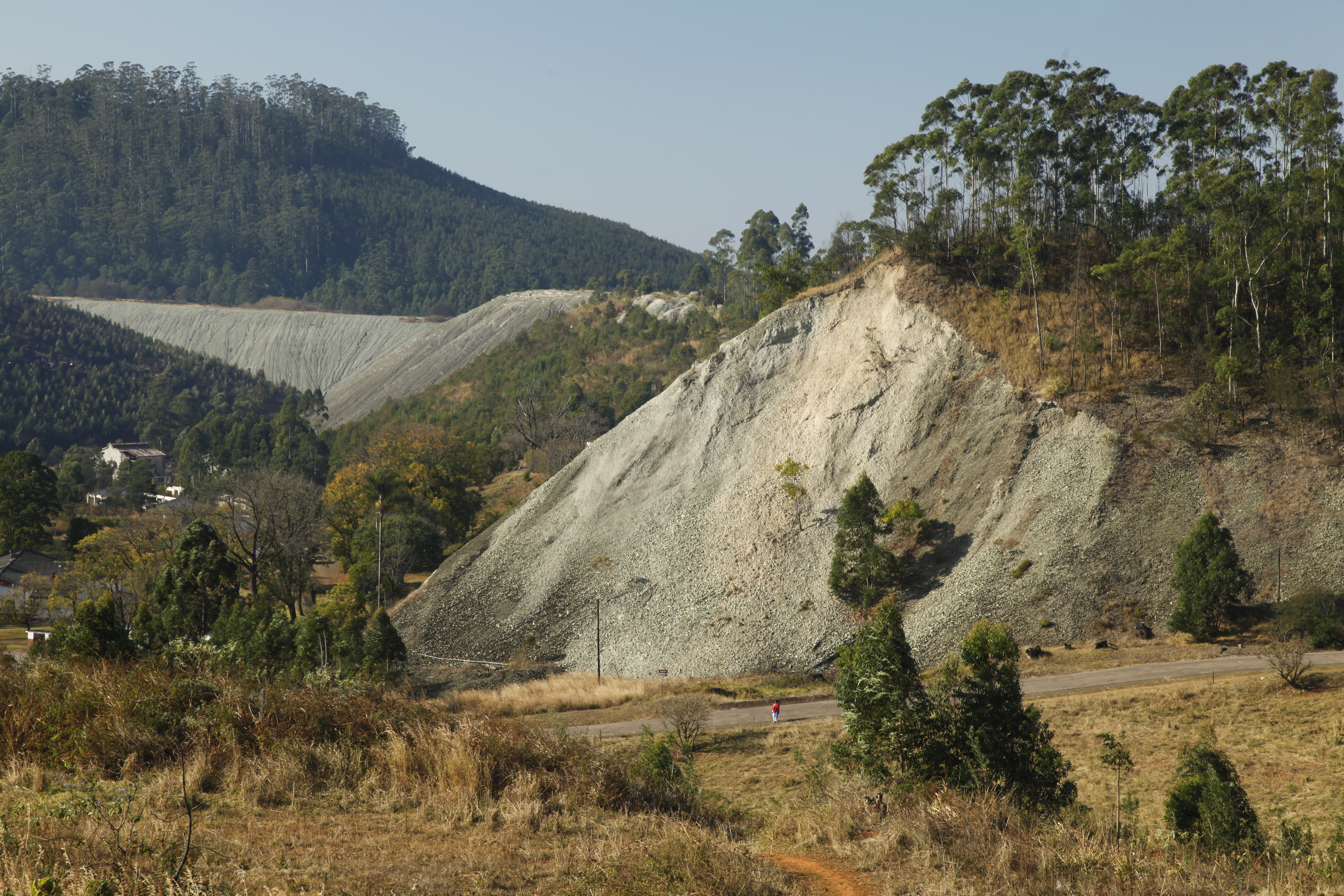
- Waste rock (foreground) and asbestos tailings (background) in Bulembu, Eswatini

- Location of Havelock mine
- Location: Hhohho, Eswatini; 25.957289°S 31.132745°E
- Products: Asbestos
- Production: ≈ 1.8 Mt
- Financial year: Lifetime
- Type: Open pit, Underground
- Greatest depth: ≈ 800 m below surface
- Opened: 1934
- Closed: 2001
- Company: State of Eswatini and Bulembu Ministries

The Havelock Asbestos Mine was an open pit and underground asbestos mine in Bulembu, Eswatini, operated by Turner & Newall (T&N) and the Swazi government from 1934 until 2001.

== Location and Overview ==
The Havelock Mine is a former asbestos mining site located near Bulembu, a former mining town in the northwestern region of Eswatini. This town is approximately 20 km south-southeast of Barberton, South Africa, and 4 km south of Emlembe, Eswatini's highest peak at 1862 masl. Havelock operated as both an open-pit and underground operation, covering an area of 1.5 × 0.4 km just south of Bulembu. Today, the mine residues include two asbestos tailings sites and a waste rock pile, covering an area of approximately 50 ha.

== History ==
=== Early operations and ownership ===
Chrysotile asbestos, also known as white asbestos, was first commercially mined at the Havelock Mine in 1939 after detailed prospecting from 1928 to 1929. Mining and processing methods included dry grinding, which, together with the crushing, sorting, grinding and bagging of the ore, generated substantial dust at the mine site and in the surrounding area. From 1939 until the early 1980s, the mine was owned and operated by the British company T&N, which was a major employer and taxpayer in Swaziland (now eSwatini) for several decades. In 1980, following T&N's bankruptcy, ownership was transferred to a consortium between Havelock Asbestos Mines and the Government of Swaziland. Thus, T&N avoided legal action, compensation claims from miners with asbestos related diseases, including their families, and the costs associated with cleaning up the mine site.

=== Mining Operations ===
The mine began as an open pit operation, but by 1948 it had been converted to underground mining, facilitated by the construction of a three-compartment inclined shaft to the east of the processing plant. In the early 1960s a more substantial 7 m diameter vertical shaft was constructed, reaching a depth of 504 m below the shaft collar by the early 1970s. This shaft served as the main access to the deeper levels of the mine until its closure in 2001.

=== Production and decline ===
Over its lifetime, the Havelock mine produced approximately 1.8 million t of asbestos, making it one of the largest asbestos mines in the world. By 2000, the mine had ceased all underground production, and tailings re-processing became the only activity until the site was decommissioned in 2001. As part of the decommissioning process, the underground workings were flooded, with water ingress occurring earlier than expected due to unusually heavy rainfall. Much of the mine's infrastructure, including rails and skips, was removed or scrapped prior to the flooding. As of 2024, the mine water in the vertical shaft stands 107 m below shaft collar and is discharging to the south via the dewatering gallery.

== Geology ==
Bulembu is located within the Onverwacht Group of the Barberton Supergroup, a geological formation known for its ancient rocks, including some of the oldest greenstone belts on Earth. The geological conditions of the region are dominated by mafic and ultramafic rocks such as komatiitic basalt and serpentinite with overlying sedimentary and metamorphic layers.

Predominately all the workings of the Havelock Mine asbestos deposit are hosted within the deformed serpentinite of the Zwartkoppie Formation, which is part of the Mendon Subgroup. These asbestos-bearing rocks, together with associated minerals such as talc, quartz and carbonate veins, have undergone extensive metamorphism and deformation, which is evident in both the surface and underground workings of the mine.

=== Mineralogy ===
A variety of minerals have been identified at the Havelock Mine, including olivine, orthopyroxene, chromite, brucite, magnesite, talc, pyrite and calcite. Recent studies of the asbestos tailings have revealed a complex mineralogical composition with chrysotile, lizardite, magnesite and talc being the most prominent. Chemical analyses indicate that the serpentinite rocks in the area contain high concentrations of magnesium oxide (MgO) and silica (SiO_{2}), with varying amounts of iron and aluminum oxides.

== Environmental impact and legacy ==
The legacy of the Havelock Mine is characterized by its environmental and health impacts, particularly due to the large amounts of dust generated during its operating years and the challenges associated with the management of the asbestos tailings. As a result, many miners developed asbestosis, of which only a small number were compensated by T&N. The closure of the mine and subsequent flooding of the underground workings has generated a substantial volume of mining-influenced water (MIW), estimated at 8–11 million m³. The quality of this water is very good and is unlikely to improve further as the mine is likely to have reached the end of its first flush period. However, the environmental legacy of the Havelock asbestos mine will remain a critical issue if the mine is to be reopened.

== Reopening ==
Because the serpentine rock in the mine's tailings contains high concentrations of magnesium, a critical raw material, proposals to reopen the mine have been discussed for several years. However, the Swazi government has rejected the project of Salamander Magnesium because it would result in the release of asbestos fibers into the air and water. Officially, the license was revoked because the company failed to meet the required deadlines.

== Gallery ==
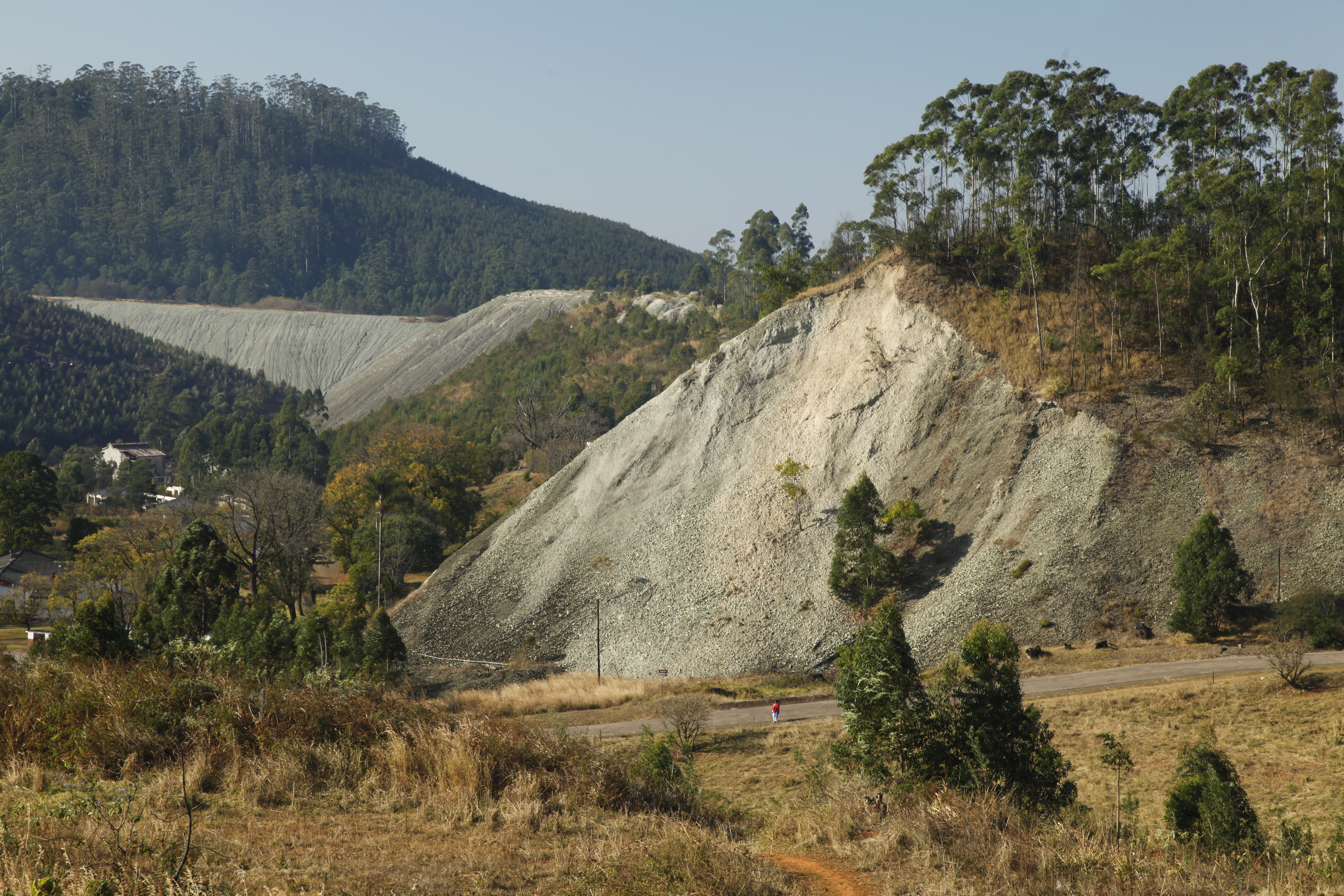

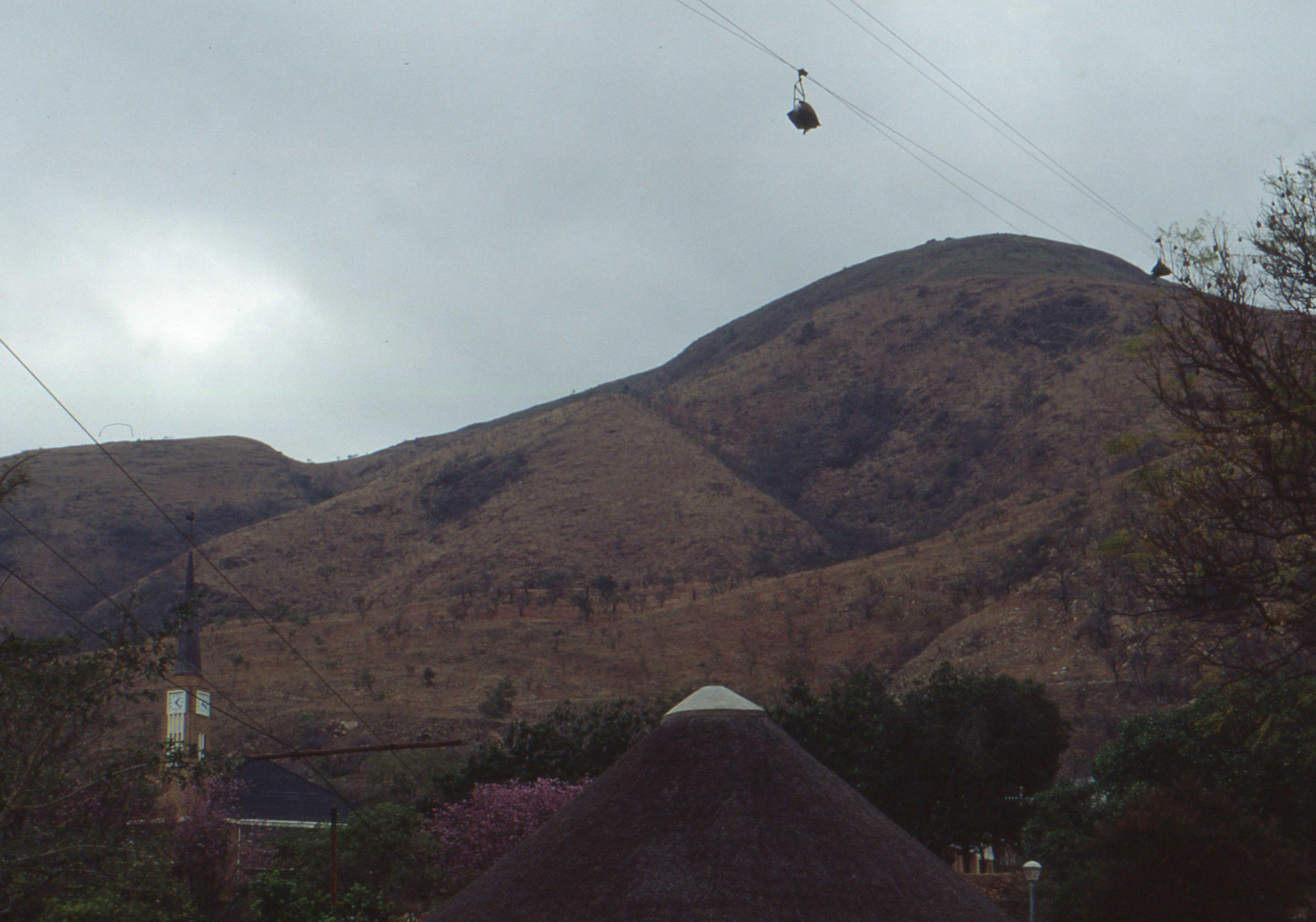

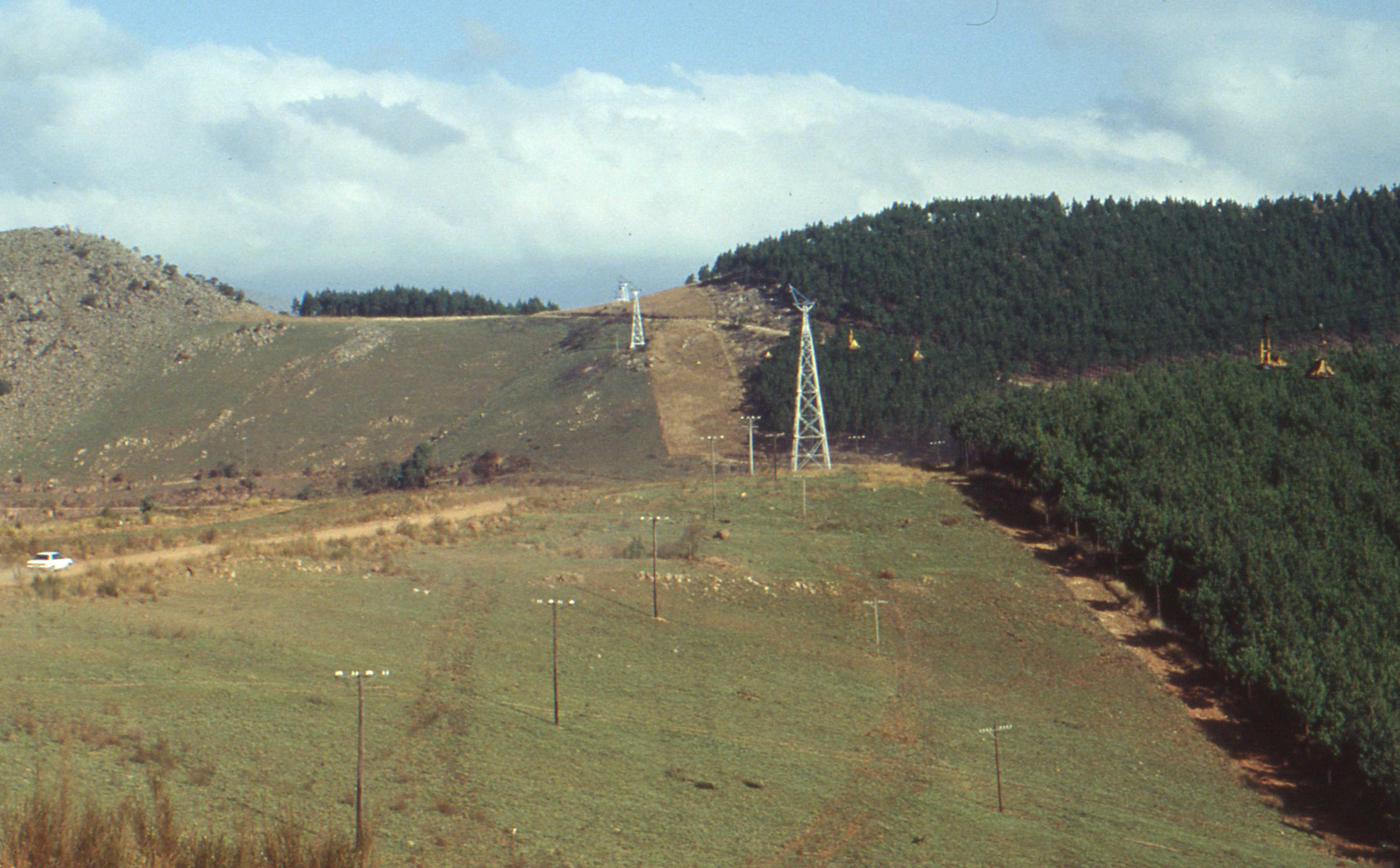

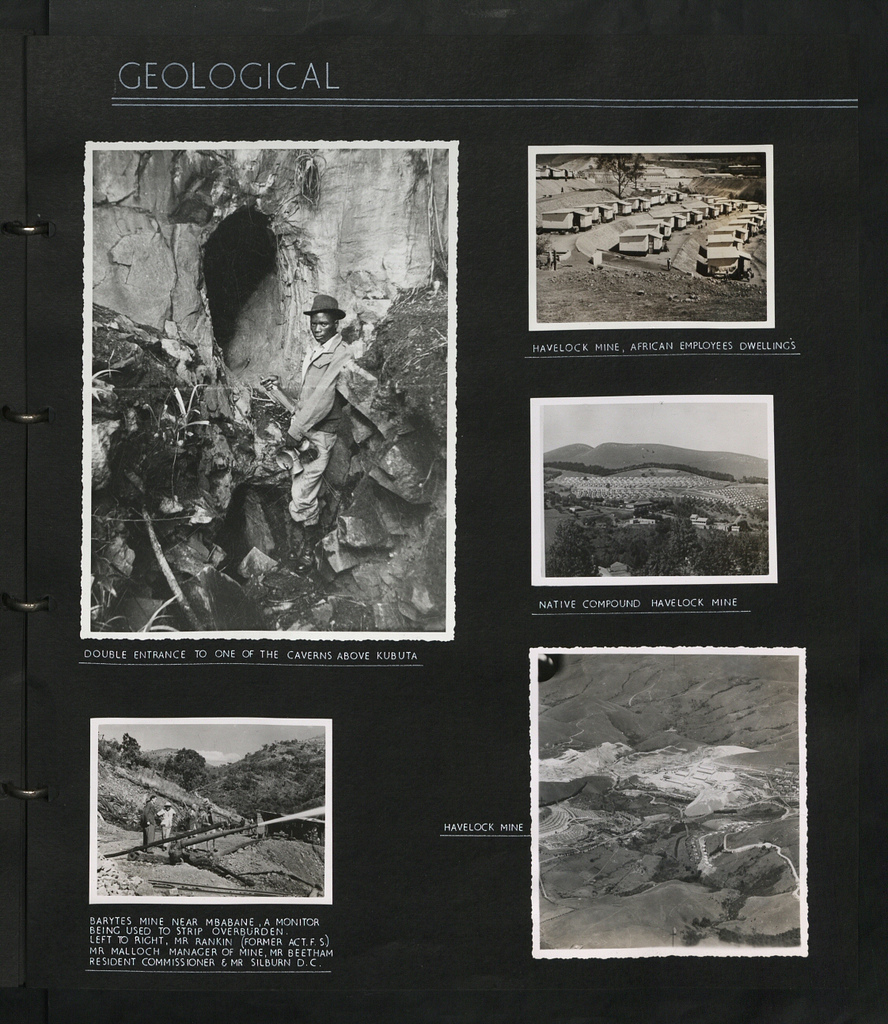

== See also ==
- Barberton Greenstone Belt
- Asbestos Mining
- Environmental impact of mining
