= R570 (South Africa) =

Regional route in South Africa

Regional route R570

Route information
- Length: 41.1 km (25.5 mi)

Major junctions
- North end: Malelane Gate of the Kruger National Park
- N4 near Malelane
- South end: Jeppes Reef border post with Eswatini

Location
- Country: South Africa

Highway system
- Numbered routes of South Africa
← R569	→ R571

The R570 is a Regional Route in Mpumalanga, South Africa.

== Route ==
Its northern origin is the Malelane gate of the Kruger National Park. From there it heads south to cross the N4 (Maputo Corridor) east of Malelane. It continues south-east, before veering south-west and passing through Schoemansdal to reach the Jeppe's Reef Border Post, where it enters Eswatini to become the MR1 road and proceed to Piggs Peak.
