= Schoemansdal, Mpumalanga =

Schoemansdal
- KaMatsamo
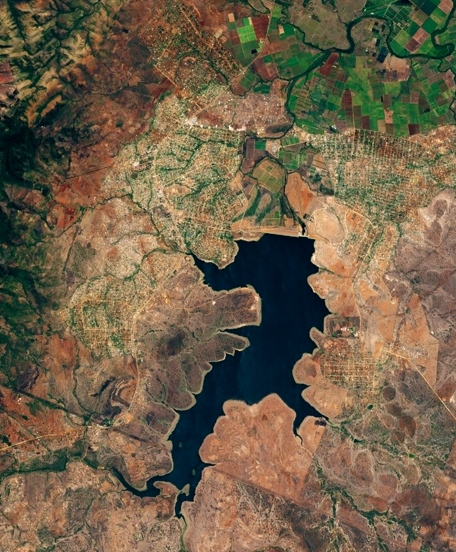
- Schoemansdal to the northwest of the Driekoppies Reservoir, imaged by Sentinel-2

- Location within Mpumalanga Location within South Africa
- Coordinates: 25.703°S 31.506°E
- Country: South Africa
- Province: Mpumalanga
- District: Ehlanzeni
- Municipality: Nkomazi

Area
  - Total: 12.91 km^{2} (4.98 sq mi)

Population (2011)
  - Total: 23,257
  - Density: 1,801/km^{2} (4,666/sq mi)

Racial makeup (2011)
  - Black African: 99.3%
  - Coloured: 0.2%
  - Indian/Asian: 0.3%
  - White: 0.1%
  - Other: 0.1%

First languages (2011)
  - Swazi: 94.8%
  - Tsonga: 1.7%
  - English: 1.1%
  - Other: 2.3%
- Time zone: UTC+2 (SAST)

Schoemansdal (officially KaMatsamo) is a town in the province of Mpumalanga (eastern Transvaal) in South Africa. It is located 23 kilometres south of Malalane on the R570 road, just north of Jeppes Reef.

During the period when the policies of separate development were implemented under the apartheid regime, Schoemansdal was the capital of the bantustan named KaNgwane.

In November 2005 the South African government announced that the town's name had been changed to KaMatsamo. The new name is in honor of prince Matsamo Shongwe.
