= Leopard Creek Country Club =

Country club in Malalane, South Africa

Coordinates: 25°26′30″S 31°32′04″E

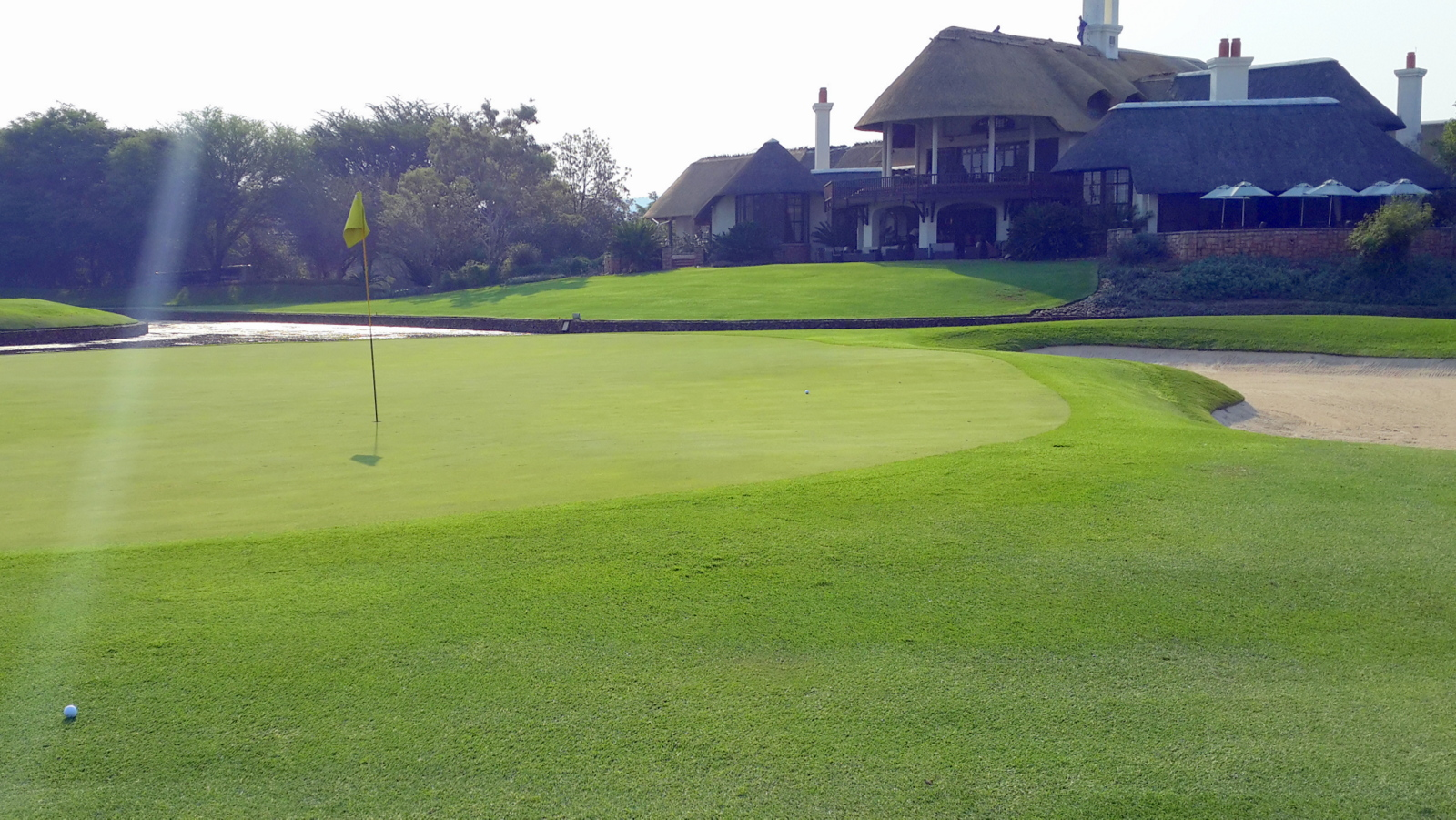
- 9th green at club house
- Interactive map of Leopard Creek Country Club

Club information
- Location: Malalane (Ehlanzeni District Municipality), Mpumalanga
- Established: 1996
- Owner: Johann Rupert
- Designed by: Gary Player
- Par: 72

Leopard Creek Country Club is a Gary Player-designed country club in Malalane, South Africa. The course sits at the border of Kruger National Park, with the Crocodile River (Mpumalanga) snaking through some fairways. The course is owned by South Africa's richest man, Johann Rupert; players often stay at the nearby Sabi Sabi game lodge. The course hosted the Alfred Dunhill Championship co-sanctioned by the DP World Tour and Sunshine Tour between 2005 to 2024.
