= Salitje =

Coordinates: 27.270°S 31.635°E

Salitje is a populated place in the south of Eswatini, by the border with South Africa, about 25 kilometres south of Hluthi.

== Sources ==
- Tracks4Africa.c.za: Salitje border post
