= HMS Havelock =

Three ships of the Royal Navy have borne the name HMS Havelock, after General Sir Henry Havelock:

- HMS Havelock (1857) was an Indian paddle gunboat launched in 1857. Her fate is unknown.
- HMS Havelock (1915) was an Abercrombie-class monitor launched in 1915. She was originally to have been named HMS General Grant, but was renamed HMS M2 and finally HMS Havelock. She was sold in 1921, but was retained, being sold again in 1927.
- HMS Havelock (H88) was an H-class destroyer originally ordered for the Brazilian Navy as Jutahy. She was requisitioned before being launched and was sold in 1946.
