= Asbestos-related diseases =

Disorders of the lung and pleura caused by the inhalation of asbestos fibres

Asbestos-related disease
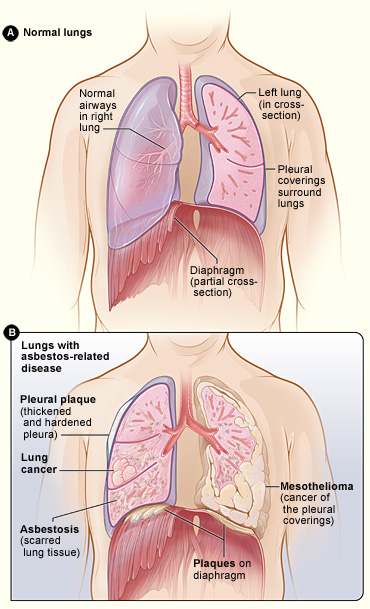
- Figure A shows the location of the lungs, airways, pleura, and diaphragm in the body. Figure B shows lungs with asbestos-related diseases, including pleural plaque, lung cancer, asbestosis, plaque on the diaphragm, and mesothelioma.
- Specialty: Respirology

Asbestos-related diseases are disorders of the lung and pleura caused by the inhalation of asbestos fibres. Asbestos-related diseases include non-malignant disorders such as asbestosis (pulmonary fibrosis due to asbestos), diffuse pleural thickening, pleural plaques, pleural effusion, rounded atelectasis and malignancies such as lung cancer and malignant mesothelioma.

People who worked in jobs with high asbestos dust exposure are at the highest risk of developing asbestos-related disease. However, exposure to asbestos may also occur in the worker's home due to dust that has accumulated on the worker's clothing (para-occupational exposure). Asbestos-related diseases can also occur as a result of non-occupational, environmental exposure. Asbestos was extensively used in many building materials, therefore large quantities of asbestos still remain in buildings that were built prior to the restriction of asbestos use that applies in many countries. The weathering and aging of such buildings may cause asbestos fragments to be released in the air and create a potential hazard. Anyone who disturbs the asbestos-containing material during home maintenance and renovation can be affected, although the exact risks are difficult to quantify.

== Pathophysiology ==
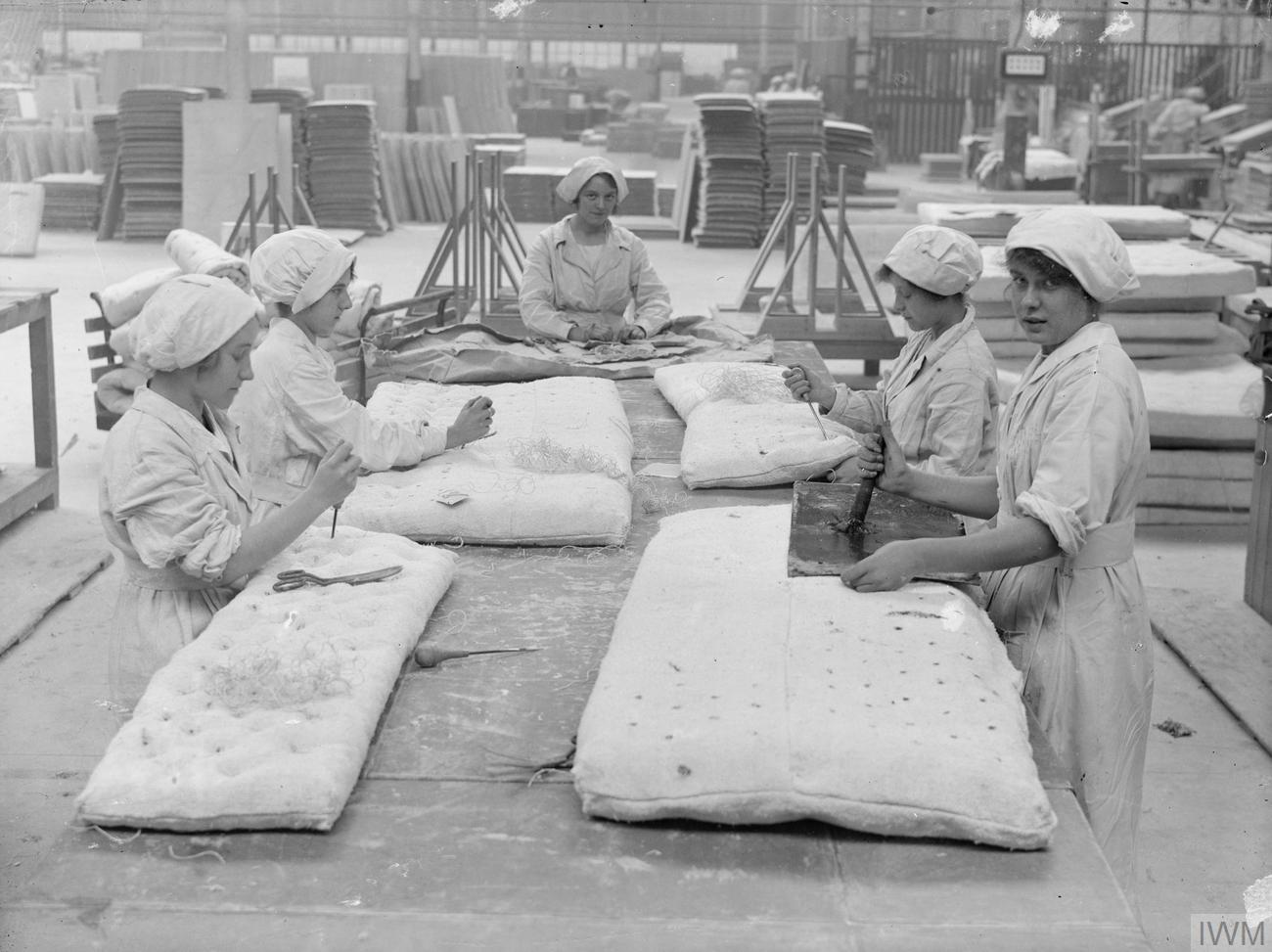
Factory workers sewing asbestos mattresses, used to line the boilers of navy vessels, without any personal protective equipment, September, 1918. The first industry regulations did not come into effect until 1932.

Inhaled asbestos fibres enter the upper and lower respiratory tracts when asbestos is released into the air. Some of the inhaled fibers are cleared by the mucociliary clearance mechanism but long thin asbestos fibers may reach the lower airways and alveoli, and can be retained in the lungs for many years. Amphibole fibers are not cleared as effectively as serpentines and therefore accumulate more readily in the distal lung parenchyma. Asbestos fibres are recognised by the lungs as foreign bodies and cause the activation of the lung's local immune system leading to inflammation, cell and tissue damage. In the long term, this can lead to fibrosis, or rarely to malignancy. From the lungs, some asbestos fibres (mainly short fibres) can also migrate to pleural and peritoneal (abdominal) spaces.

== Non-malignant asbestos-related pleural diseases ==
Benign asbestos-related pleural abnormalities encompass four types of pleural changes:

- Pleural plaques
- Diffuse pleural thickening
- Benign asbestos pleural effusions
- Rounded atelectasis (folded lung)

The pleura appears to be more sensitive than the lung parenchyma to the effects of asbestos fibres. Thus asbestos-related pleural diseases can result from much lower doses than the fibrotic changes in the lung.

=== Pleural plaques ===
Pleural plaques are the most common manifestation of asbestos exposure, affecting up to 58% of asbestos-exposed workers. The prevalence among the general population exposed environmentally ranges from 0.53 to 8%. Pleural plaques are discrete circumscribed areas of hyaline fibrosis (patches of thickening) of the parietal pleura and rarely the visceral pleura that develop 20 to 40 years after first exposure. Over time, usually more than 30 years, they often become partly calcified. They consist of mature collagen fibers arranged in an open basket-weave pattern and are covered by flattened or cuboidal mesothelial cells. They have a white or pale yellow shaggy appearance and are typically distributed on the posterolateral chest wall, diaphragm, and mediastinal pleura. The number and size varies. Pleural plaques are typically asymptomatic, however, there is still some controversy on this topic. An association between pleural plaques and chest pain has been reported, but this has not been confirmed in more recent studies. Similarly, an association between pleural plaques and a restrictive impairment with diminished diffusing capacity on pulmonary function testing has been described. This has not been a consistent finding and it has been postulated that this might be related to undetected early fibrosis. The pathogenesis of pleural plaques remains uncertain. The most likely explanation is that asbestos fibres reach the parietal pleura by passage through lymphatic channels where they excite an inflammatory reaction. The chest X-ray is the usual tool for diagnosing pleural plaques but chest CT scan is more sensitive and specific in this regard. Pleural plaques are evidence of past asbestos exposure and indicate an increased risk for the future development of other asbestos-related diseases. Pleural plaques in themselves are not pre-malignant. Individuals with pleural plaques are usually not compensated in most compensation systems.

=== Diffuse pleural thickening ===
Diffuse pleural thickening (DPT) is non-circumscribed fibrous thickening of the visceral pleura with areas of adherence to the parietal pleura and obliteration of the pleural space. It often extends over the area of an entire lobe or lung, with fibrotic areas involving costophrenic angles, apices, lung bases, and interlobar fissures. The thickness ranges from less than 1 mm up to 1 cm or more and may extend for a few millimeters into the lung parenchyma. Fibrous strands ("crow's feet") extending from the thickened pleura into the lung parenchyma can be often detected on CT scan. Diffuse pleural thickening develops 20 to 40 years after first exposure. All types of asbestos can cause diffuse pleural thickening and a dose-related relationship has been described. It is thought that asbestos fibres that reach the pleura induce subpleural fibroblasts and mesothelial cells to produce scar tissue and collagen deposition, resulting in subpleural thickening. Pleural plaques often coexist with DPT although the latter is rare compared with pleural plaques. According to the Australian Surveillance of Australian Workplace Based Respiratory Events (SABRE) scheme, DPT accounted for 22% of all asbestos-related diseases. It usually begins with an inflammation of the pleura that is accompanied by a pleural effusion. Most patients complain of exertional breathlessness, however, chest pain has been also associated with this disorder. DPT has a significant impact on pulmonary function, causing a decrease in forced vital capacity, reducing total lung capacity and diffusing capacity. The restrictive impairment is a result of adhesions of the parietal with the visceral pleura as well as possible diaphragmatic involvement. Medical imaging is needed for diagnosis of diffuse pleural thickening. The appearance on a postero-anterior chest radiograph is of a continuous, irregular pleural shadowing. In accordance with the International Labour Organization (2000) classification, diffuse pleural thickening is considered to be present if there is obliteration of the costophrenic angle in continuity with ≥3 mm pleural thickening. CT scanning is more sensitive than chest radiography and can detect early pleural thickening (i.e. 1-2mm in thickness). The most commonly used classification system defines diffuse pleural thickening as a continuous sheet of pleural thickening more than 5 cm wide, more than 8 cm in craniocaudal extent, and more than 3 mm thick. Most patients are only mildly impaired by diffuse pleural thickening. Treatment options are limited but any new onset or severe pain should be investigated to exclude malignancy. In most compensation systems, patients are eligible for compensation which corresponds to the severity of disability.

=== Benign asbestos pleural effusion ===
Benign asbestos pleural effusion is an exudative pleural effusion (a buildup of fluid between the two pleural layers) following asbestos exposure. It is relatively uncommon and the earliest manifestation of disease following asbestos exposure, usually occurring within 10 years from exposure. Effusions may be asymptomatic but rarely, they can cause pain, fever, and breathlessness. Effusions usually last for 3–4 months and then resolve completely. They can also progress to diffuse pleural thickening. Diagnosis relies on a compatible history of asbestos exposure and exclusion of other probable causes.

=== Rounded atelectasis ===
Rounded atelectasis (also known as Blesovsky's or folded lung syndrome) develops from infolding of thickened visceral pleura with collapse of the intervening lung parenchyma. It presents radiographically as a mass and may be mistaken for a tumour. On a CT scan of the chest it appears as a rounded mass like opacity in the peripheral lung adjacent to thickened pleura and with curvilinear opacities which are the bronchi and vessels (comet tail). Rounded atelectasis is the least common asbestos-related benign pleural disease. Exposure to asbestos is the most likely cause today but it can occur following other medical conditions. It is a chronic condition and usually asymptomatic.

== Asbestosis ==
Asbestosis is a chronic lung disease caused by scarring of lung tissue, which results from prolonged exposure to asbestos. It is defined as diffuse interstitial pulmonary fibrosis secondary to asbestos exposure. It initially affects the lung bases and usually manifests after 15 or more years from initial exposure. It occurs after high intensity and/or long-term exposure to asbestos. Asbestos-related fibrosis is progressive because it continues to progress in the lung even if no further asbestos is inhaled. The scar tissue causes the alveolar walls to thicken, reducing the lung capacity which leads to the patient experiencing shortness of breath (dyspnea). Those affected are at an increased risk for heart failure and certain malignancies.

== Malignant asbestos-related diseases ==
=== Malignant mesothelioma ===
Malignant mesothelioma is an aggressive and incurable tumour caused by asbestos arising from mesothelial cells of the pleura, peritoneum (the lining of the abdominal cavity) and rarely elsewhere. Pleural mesothelioma is the most common type of mesothelioma, representing about 75 percent of cases. Peritoneal mesothelioma is the second most common type, consisting of about 10 to 20 percent of cases. Mesothelioma appears from 20 to 50 years after the initial exposure to asbestos. The symptoms include shortness of breath, chronic chest pain, cough, and weight loss. Diagnosing mesothelioma is often difficult and can include physical examination, chest X-ray and lung function tests, followed by CT scan and MRI. A biopsy is needed to confirm a diagnosis of malignant mesothelioma. Mesothelioma has a poor prognosis, with most patients dying within 1 year of diagnosis. The treatment strategies include surgery, radiotherapy, chemotherapy or multimodality treatment. Several tumour biomarkers (soluble mesothelin-related protein (SMRP), osteopontin and fibulin3) have been evaluated for diagnostic purposes to allow early detection of this disease. Novel biomarkers such as volatile organic compounds measured in exhaled breath are also promising.

=== Asbestos-related lung cancer ===
Asbestos can cause lung cancer that is identical to lung cancer from other causes. Exposure to asbestos is associated with all major histological types of lung carcinoma (adenocarcinoma, squamous cell carcinoma, large-cell carcinoma and small-cell carcinoma). The latency period between exposure and development of lung cancer is 20 to 30 years. It is estimated that 3–8% of all lung cancers are related to asbestos. The risk of developing lung cancer depends on the level, duration, and frequency of asbestos exposure (cumulative exposure). Smoking and individual susceptibility are other contributing factors towards lung cancer. Smokers who have been exposed to asbestos are at far greater risk of lung cancer. Smoking and asbestos exposure have a multiplicative (synergistic) effect on the risk of lung cancer. Symptoms include chronic cough, chest pain, breathlessness, haemoptysis (coughing up blood), wheezing or hoarseness of the voice, weight loss and fatigue. Treatment involves surgical removal of the cancer, chemotherapy, radiotherapy, or a combination of these (multimodality treatment). Prognosis is generally poor unless the cancer is detected in its early stages. Out of all patients diagnosed with lung cancer, only 15% survive for five years after diagnosis.

== History ==
Thousands of scientific and medical articles have chronicled human understanding of the hazards of asbestos to human life. This understanding paralleled the growth of the Industrial Revolution, particularly in the textile factories and mines of Great Britain. This body of knowledge is frequently referred to in litigation as the state of the art or the benchmark for determining if a company acted within the bounds of negligent behavior. The following is a chronological list of some of the major pre-1950 scientific and medical articles relating to the knowledge of the medical and scientific communities regarding asbestos and disease in humans:

Year	Publication
1898	Annual Report of the Chief Inspector of Factories and Workshops, Part II, H.M. Stationery Office, 1898, pp. 171–172
1912	"Effect of Asbestos Dust on Workers Health in Asbestos Mines and Factories". The Labour Gazette: 761–762. 1912.
1918	Hoffman, F.L. (1918). Mortality from Respiratory Diseases in Dusty Trades (Inorganic Dusts). U.S. Dept. of Labor, Bureau of Labor Statistics. pp. 35–47, 163–181.
1924	Cooke, W.E. (July 26, 1924). "Fibrosis of the Lungs due to the Inhalation of Asbestos Dust". British Medical Journal. 2 (3317): 147–140.2. doi:10.1136/bmj.2.3317.147. PMC 2304688. PMID 20771679.
1928	Editorial (1928). "Pulmonary Asbestosis". JAMA. 90 (2): 119–120. doi:10.1001/jama.1928.02690290049014.
1928	Simpson, F.W. (1929). "Pulmonary Asbestosis in South Africa". British Medical Journal. 1 (3516): 885–887. doi:10.1136/bmj.1.3516.885. PMC 2455583.
1929	Haddow, A.C. (August 3, 1929). "Asbestosis". The Lancet. 214: 231. doi:10.1016/s0140-6736(01)04102-2.
1929	Wood, W. Burton (May 1929). "Pulmonary asbestosis: Radiographic appearances in skiagrams of the chests of workers in asbestos". Tubercle. 10 (8): 353–363. doi:10.1016/S0041-3879(29)80024-4.
1930	Correspondence, Foreign Letters (June 28, 1930). "Compensation Act to be Extended to Asbestosis". JAMA. 94 (26): 2078. doi:10.1001/jama.1930.02710520044016.
1930	Mills, R.G. (June 28, 1930). "Report of a Case". Minnesota Medicine: 495–499.
1930	Editorial (1930). "Current Comment, Pulmonary Asbestosis". JAMA. 95 (19): 1431. doi:10.1001/jama.1930.02720190042014.
1930	Merewether, E.R.A. (May 1930). "The Occurrence of Pulmonary Fibrosis and Other Pulmonary Afflictions in Asbestos Workers". J. Ind. Hyg. 5. 12: 198–257.
1930	"Health and Industrial Hygiene - Pulmonary Asbestosis". Monthly Labor Review. 31: 74–76. 1930.
1930	Encyclopedia of Hygiene, Pathology and Social Welfare: Occupation and Health, Vol. I, A-H. Geneva: International Labor Office. 1930. pp. 189–181.
1930	Gardner, L.U. (1931). "Studies on Experimental Pneumonoconiosis: VI. Inhalation of Asbestos Dust, Its Effect Upon Primary Tuberculosis Infection". J. Ind. Hyg. 2. 13: 65–114.
1930	Gordon, B (June 1931). "Pulmonary Asbestosis". Penn.Med.J. 35: 637–639.
1934	Woods, W.B.; Gloyne, S.R. (1934). "Pulmonary Asbestosis". Lancet. 2 (5808): 1383–1385. doi:10.1016/s0140-6736(00)43332-5.
1938	Dreesen (August 1938). "A Study of Asbestos in the Asbestos Textile Industry". U.S. Treasury Dept., Public Health Bulletin: 1–126.
1941	Dublin (1941). "Occupational Hazards and Diagnostic Signs, Bulletin". U.S. Dept. Of Labor, Div. Of Labor Standards. 41: II, IV, V and 25.
1942	Holleb, H.B. (1942). "Bronchiogenic Carcinoma in Association with Pulmonary Asbestosis". American Journal of Pathology: 123–131.
1944	Wedler, H.W. (1944). "Asbestosis and Pulmonmary Carcinoma". Bulletin of Hygiene. 19: 362.
1944	Editorial (November 25, 1944). "Environmental Cancer". JAMA. 126 (13): 836. doi:10.1001/jama.1944.02850480036012.
1944	Hutchinson (1944). "Dust as an Industrial Health Hazard". Heating and Ventilating. 41 (6): 57–61.
1946	Fleischer, W.F. (1946). "Health Survey of Pipe Covering Operations in Constructing Naval Vessels". Journal of Industrial Hygiene and Toxicology. 1: 9–16. PMID 21016030.
1948	Lynch, K.M. (1948), Asbestosis IV: Analysis of Forty Necropsied Cases, Diseases of the Chest, pp. 79–81
1949	Merewether (1949), Annual Report of the Chief Inspector of Factories for 1947, London: H.M. Stationary Ofc., pp. 79–81
1949	Wyers (1949). "Asbestosis". Postgraduate Medical Journal. 25 (290): 631–638. doi:10.1136/pgmj.25.290.631. PMC 2530167. PMID 15396262.
