= R571 (South Africa) =

Regional route in South Africa

Regional route R571

Route information
- Length: 76.3 km (47.4 mi)

Major junctions
- North end: Crocodile Bridge Gate of the Kruger National Park
- N4 in Komatipoort
- South end: MR5 MR5 at the Mananga border with Eswatini

Location
- Country: South Africa

Highway system
- Numbered routes of South Africa
← R570	→ R572

The R571 is a Regional Route in South Africa that connects the Kruger National Park with the Mananga border post with Eswatini via Komatipoort.

== Route ==
Its northern origin is the Crocodile Bridge gate of the Kruger National Park. From there it heads south to Komatipoort, where it passes through as Rissik Street and reaches a junction with the N4 (Maputo Corridor). It joins the N4 eastwards for 2 kilometres, crossing the Komati River, before splitting from the N4 and becoming its own road southwards. It continues south, following the Komati River, to reach the Mananga Border Post (east of Magudu), where it crosses into Eswatini and continues as the MR5 road.
