= Havelock, North Dakota =

Unincorporated community in North Dakota, U.S.

Coordinates: 46°28′29″N 102°44′38″W

Havelock
- Unincorporated community
- Location in North Dakota
- Country: United States
- State: North Dakota
- County: Hettinger
- Elevation: 2,507 ft (764 m)
- Time zone: UTC−7 (MST)
  - Summer (DST): UTC−6 (MDT)
- Area code: 701

Havelock is an unincorporated community in Hettinger County, in the U.S. state of North Dakota.

== History ==
In April 1907, the first Moravian settlers arrived to this area in the vicinity of Strehlow, New England P. O., North Dakota. They were visited by Moravian Bishop Karl A. Müller for the first time in the summer of 1908, and four years later, on October 17, 1912, a congregation was organized. Henry R. Heise, who had commenced work among these new settlers as a lay pastor, was ordained by the Moravian Church and formally installed as pastor on April 13, 1913. At this time, there were only 12 communicants and 2 children living in the community. This congregation operated and constituted the bulk of the small community's membership until September 4, 1921. A post office called Havelock was established in 1910, and remained in operation until 1948 The community was named for a railroad promoter.
