= Bulembu =

- Motto: Restore a town. Transform a nation.
- Location in Eswatini
- Coordinates: 25°57′S 31°08′E
- Country: Eswatini
- District: Hhohho
- Established: 2006
- Elevation: 4,065 ft (1,239 m)

Population (January 2010)
  - Total: 2,000
- Time zone: UTC+2 (SAST)
- Area code: +268
- Climate: Cwb
- Website: http://www.bulembu.org/

Bulembu is a small town located in northwestern Hhohho, Eswatini, 10 km west of the town of Piggs Peak and close to the border with South Africa. Located above the Komati Valley in Eswatini's Highveld, Bulembu is named after the siSwati word for a spider's web.

The town of Bulembu is privately owned by a not-for-profit, Bulembu Ministries Eswatini. The Bulembu Foundation is based in Vancouver, Canada.

== Background ==
Between 1939 and 2001, Bulembu operated as a chrysotile (white asbestos) mine. Originally named Havelock Mine, the mine was part of the UK's Turner & Newall Asbestos Group. The mine encountered heavy losses in the late 1980s and subsequently went bankrupt in 1991. The company was liquidated and the assets purchased in 1991 by HVL Asbestos Swd. Ltd. who changed the name of the mine to Bulembu Mine. HVL Asbestos ran the mine until it went into liquidation in 2001.

Upon liquidation the 10,000 residents of Bulembu soon deserted the town in search for employment elsewhere and the town became a ghost town with little more than 50 people remaining there. This was during the time that Eswatini was (as it continues to be) ravaged by the HIV/AIDS virus. There was a 900% increase in infection in one decade with the infection rate sitting at 3.9% in 1992 to 38.6% in 2002. Today over 40% of the population is infected and the result is a nationwide orphan crisis.

The assets were purchased by Bulembu Development Corporation who sold the town and its 1,700-hectare property in 2006 to a not-for-profit, Bulembu Ministries Swaziland. Bulembu was purchased with the plan to rejuvenate the town as a self-sustaining entity with enterprises and care for orphans.

Bulembu Ministries Swaziland created a number of sustainable enterprises in 2008 to 2009, such as a eucalyptus and pine plantation for timber and charcoal, honey, bottled water, bakery, dairy, mill and tourism.

By November 2009 there were 108 orphans under Bulembu Ministry Swaziland's care. Instead of living in an institutional orphanage each child lives in a home with a caregiver and a group of five other children. Approximately 70% of Bulembu's orphan care program is funded through child sponsorship. Sponsors send funds each month to provide support for the sponsored children.

In 2011, Canadian folk-rock band Spirit of the West released "Bulembu", a charity single to benefit the project which included choral vocals by children from Bulembu.
