= Sicunusa =

Sincunsa lies in a scenic valley, surrounded by the Mdzimba Mountains

Coordinates: 26°52′S 30°57′E

Sicunusa is a town in southwest Eswatini. It is located close to the border with South Africa.
