= Lundzi =

Town in Eswatini

Coordinates: 26.444965°S 30.873429°E

Lundzi is a town in western Eswatini. It is located close to the border with South Africa, 25 kilometres west of the capital, Mbabane.
