= Mananga =

Border crossing between South Africa and Eswatini

Coordinates: 25.9331°S 31.7613°E

Mananga in Mpumalanga is a border post between South Africa and the north of Eswatini. The border is open between 07:00 and 18:00.
