= Malalane =

Malalane Malelane
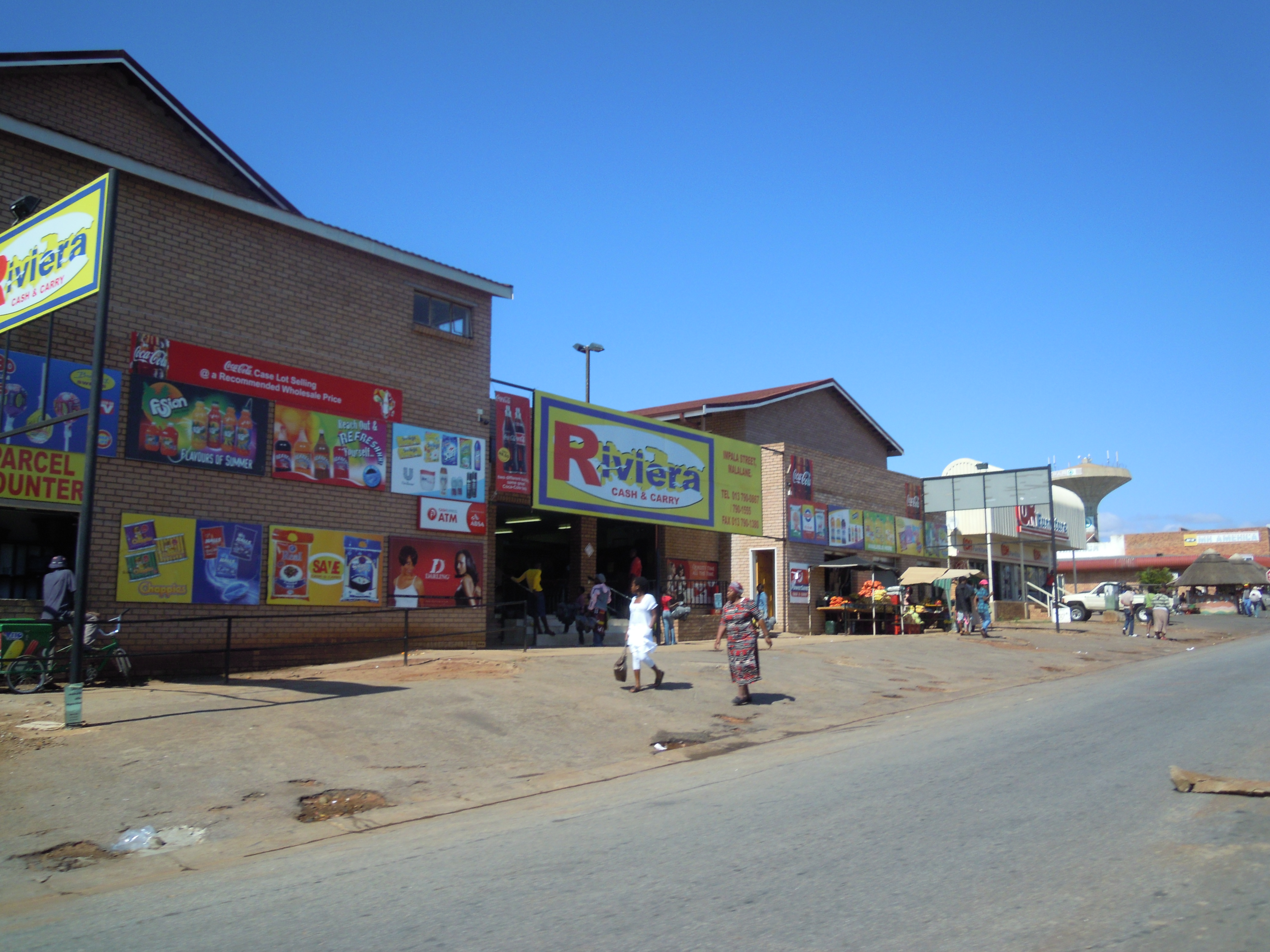
- A street in Malalane

- Location within Mpumalanga Location within South Africa
- Coordinates: 25°29′S 31°31′E
- Country: South Africa
- Province: Mpumalanga
- District: Ehlanzeni
- Municipality: Nkomazi

Government
  - Type: Part of a Local municipality

Area
  - Total: 2.94 km^{2} (1.14 sq mi)

Population (2011)
  - Total: 3,486
  - Density: 1,190/km^{2} (3,070/sq mi)

Racial makeup (2011)
  - Black African: 43.2%
  - Coloured: 2.6%
  - Indian/Asian: 10.7%
  - White: 43.2%
  - Other: 0.3%

First languages (2011)
  - Afrikaans: 25.2%
  - Swazi: 44.6%
  - English: 17.9%
  - Tsonga: 3.4%
  - Other: 11.8%
- Time zone: UTC+2 (SAST)
- Postal code (street): 1320
- PO box: 1320
- Area code: 013

Malalane, alternatively rendered Malelane, is a farming town in Mpumalanga, South Africa situated on the N4 national highway. The farms in the region produce sugarcane, subtropical fruit and winter vegetables. The town was proclaimed in 1949, after which it was named. The origin of the name is disputed but was corrupted from the Swazi. Either the expression "eMlalani" which means place of the palms, or the expression "lala" which means to sleep are accepted origins of the name. The town started as the first rest-stop between Lourenço Marques and Pretoria. As of July 2007 the town was officially renamed from "Malelane" to "Malalane" as part of the government's renaming scheme by the South African Geographical Names Council.

== History ==
In the area surrounding Malalane is an ancient hematite mine, at Dumaneni, one of the oldest mines in the world - dating back to 46 000 and 28 500 years ago during the Middle Stone Age. One of Malalane's earliest colonists was Captain GJ (Mkonto) Elphick. After having fought in the Anglo-Boer War (1899–1902), Elphick bought the old Malalane farm and successfully planted tomatoes, cotton, mangos, oranges and pawpaws. Elphick also pioneered the commercial aspect of Malalane by opening the first store in the vicinity.

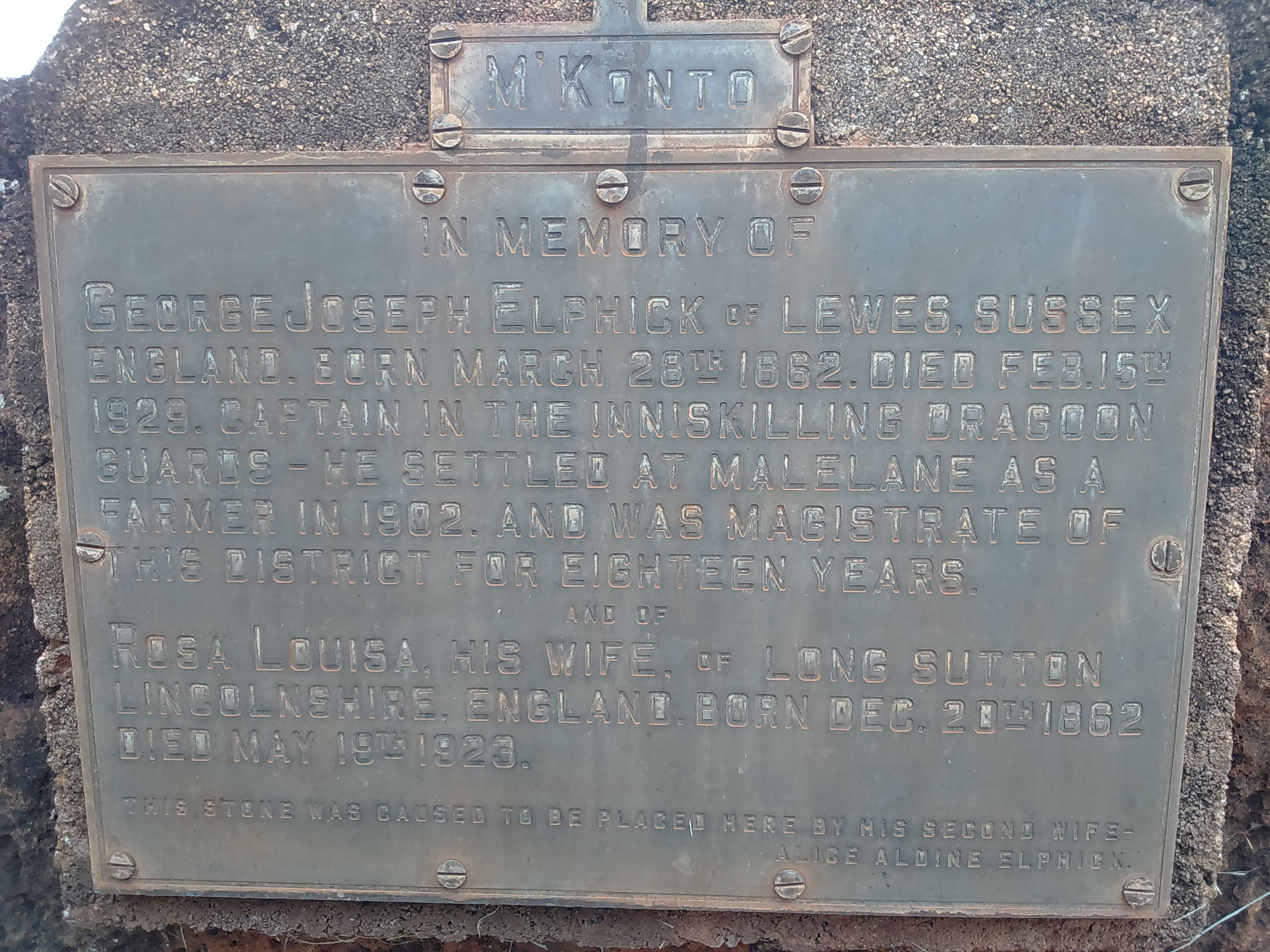
One of the tombstones erected for GJ Elphick at the Malalane cemetery

Despite Elphick's operations, the Onderberg area was predominantly a bush area and formed part of The Kruger Shooting Concession. Leopard, lion and buffalo were often shot as a sport. In 1926 the area was proclaimed as The Kruger National Park and hunting was stopped. The effect of this was minimal, as visitors still arrived, though to see the game instead of hunting it. With the formation of the national park a barbed wire fence was erected. This had little effect on the agricultural sector of the region except that animals were now more controlled and were limited in roaming onto farmers crops, although larger game such as buffalo and elephant still strayed onto farms.

In 1942 the government of the Transvaal commissioned a dirt road through the area for military use, that was later tarred. The road increased traffic through the area, however this had little effect on the local economy as the traffic was primarily passing through to Lourenço Marques (now Maputo). The odd traveller may have stopped at a local shop, with little impact on trade in general.

In 1963 the fence bordering the Kruger National Park was upgraded to meet international standards and was proclaimed proficient against the threat of foot-and-mouth disease in the park. The migration of larger game was severely restricted. Elephant, buffalo, lion and hippo now had extremely limited access to crops and farmers could invest more into their produce as the threat of them being destroyed by wild animals was minimal. Cattle were a popular choice as the threat of them being eaten by predators was now much less than before.

1965 saw the upgrade of the foot-and-mouth fence. It was electrified and known as the "Snyman fence". It also saw the construction of the Transvaal Suiker Beperk (TSB) sugar mill near the Malelane Entrance to the Kruger National Park. Naturally this had the effect of mass planting of sugar cane in the area. The area soon began to flourish and was characterised by good sugar production and tourism. The mill still runs to this day and serves local farmers. The military road was upgraded again to meet the needs of the area but also to service Eskom operations in the area. This facilitated access for tourists who entered the region, besides those en route to Mozambique, and goods could now be transported more easily.

== Economy and tourism ==
A trend of growth was experienced until 1998 when the road servicing the area was upgraded yet again to national road status. The road was named the ‘N4’ and later became a toll road. A government project was launched which saw significant growth in the area, known as the Maputo Corridor, with big corporations settling in the area. Malelane Gate was then named as one of the main entrances to the Kruger National Park. This led to a drastic increase in tourism in the area and many lodges were established. These include: Malelane Lodge, Pestana Lodge and some bed and breakfasts. The area also saw the establishment of Riverview Primary and Laerskool Malelane. Sun International bought Malelane Lodge and Spar and Pick 'n Pay also invested in branches of their retail shops in the area.

This was beneficial to the area, in particular the agricultural sector. Rather than buying goods from far away suppliers Spar and Pick 'n Pay bought from local farmers. This had an added benefit that farmers now had a stable market where their goods could be sold. Unsurprisingly tourists of the area also bought goods from the new shops rather than bringing in their own goods from afar.

Due to the increase of tourist activities in the area, many contractors were brought in to meet the demands of new developments in the area. The growth of Malalane town was now at a peak as many people were now living in the town or nearby because their jobs entailed them working at lodges or similar establishments in the immediate area. This boosted the local economy greatly and local shops benefited greatly from the new influx of trade. More trade also came from Mozambique after the civil war.

Future developments saw sections of the Kruger National Park being outsourced to large companies and corporations. This had both negative and positive effects on the region. By outsourcing sections of the Kruger National Park the companies involved could attract more foreign tourists. The bonus of this was that the tourists injected large amounts of foreign money into the area's economy. This did have a bump-on effect though. Local companies lost out in trade to the corporations and consequently some local businesses suffered. The National Parks Board also declared a policy of no additional peripheral development (i.e. no new camps, lodges or developments were to be built in the park). Together with the deregulation of open top game vehicles, the park saw entrance admissions previously unheard of.

The development of the Leopard Creek Country Club and housing estate aided in giving the local economy a boost. An added bonus to this was the revenue brought in from golf tournaments, such as the Sunshine Tour's Alfred Dunhill Championship, and was beneficial to the town. More lodges and B&Bs were also built in the area.

== Transport ==
=== Roads ===
Malalane lies on the N4 between Mbombela to the west and Maputo in Mozambique to the east. The town can be accessed from the N4 by turning off at Air Street or Buffalo Street.

Tolling
The N4, managed by Trans African Concessions (TRAC), involves payment of toll: Traffic heading west on the N4 (the direction of Mbombela) and traffic approaching Malalane from the west must pass through the Nkomazi Toll Plaza, approximately 18 kilometres (11 mi) west of the town. The aforementioned tollgate is also the easternmost one on the N4 before the Lebombo Border Post (Mozambique-South Africa border post) near Komatipoort.
