= List of mountain passes of Mpumalanga =

This is a list of publicly accessible, motorable passes in the Mpumalanga province, South Africa.
See Mountain Passes of South Africa

Name	Location	Road	Crosses	Highest Point (m)	Between towns	Road surface
Bergvlei Pass		R536			Sabie and Hazyview	
Bothasnek	25.7525°S 30.8584°E	R38			Barberton and Carolina	
Caspersnek Pass	24.7322°S 30.7173°E					
Crossroads Pass	25.5971°S 30.2919°E	R36				
De Berg Pass	25.2156°S 30.1725°E	R577			Lydenburg and Roossenekal	
Elands Pass	25.6477°S 30.3612°E	N4			Waterval Boven and Mbombela	
Hennings Pass	25.5042°S 30.2262°E					
Hilltop Pass		R40			Barberton and Mbombela	
Jaap-se-Hoogte	25.1459°S 30.2914°E	R577			Lydenburg and Roossenekal	
Kaapsehoop Pass	25.5988°S 30.7656°E				Hemlock and Mbombela	
Kowyn Pass	24.9624°S 30.8576°E	R533			Graskop and Bushbuckridge	
Kranspoort Pass	25.4506°S 29.4592°E	N11			Groblersdal and Middelburg	
Long Tom Pass	25.1508°S 30.6239°E	R37			Lydenburg and Sabie	
Mokobulaan Pass	25.2711°S 30.5258°E				Lydenburg and Sudwala	
Montrose Pass	25.4438°S 30.7225°E	N4			Waterval Boven and Mbombela	
Mpageni Pass	25.5543°S 31.2024°E				Mbombela and Matsulu	
Nelshoogte	25.8530°S 30.7616°E	R38			Barberton and Carolina	
Nylshoogte Pass	25.7569°S 30.8408°E	R38			Barberton and Carolina	
Robbers Pass	24.8711°S 30.6922°E	R533			Ohrigstad and Pilgrims Rest	
Santa Pass	25.3395°S 30.1747°E	R540			Dullstroom and Lydenburg	
Schoemans Kloof	25.3870°S 30.5246°E	R539			Bambi and Elandshoek	
Skurweberg Pass	25.7955°S 30.3717°E	R541			Machadodorp and Badplaas	
Sudwala Pass	25.3399°S 30.7338°E				Lydenburg and Sudwala	
Veraaiersnek Pass	24.8958°S 30.5492°E	R36			Lydenburg and Ohrigstad	
Watervalsrivier Pass	24.9382°S 30.3677°E	R37			Lydenburg and Burgersfort	
