= R532 (South Africa) =

Regional Route in South Africa

Regional route R532

Route information
- Length: 117 km (73 mi)

Major junctions
- North end: R36 near Ohrigstad; R533 in Graskop; R536 / R537 in Sabie
- South end: R37 near Sabie

Location
- Country: South Africa

Highway system
- Numbered routes of South Africa
← R531	→ R533

The R532 is a Regional Route in South Africa that connects the Blyde River Canyon with Sabie via Graskop.

== Route ==
The R532 begins at a junction with the R36 approximately 20 kilometres north of Ohrigstad in the Limpopo province. It starts by heading east, crossing into Mpumalanga province and reaching the Blyde River Canyon, where it turns to the south and passes on the western edge of the Blyde River Canyon Nature Reserve to reach the village of Leroro. The R532 continues south from Leroro, through Moremela, crossing the Blyde River, to reach the town of Graskop, where it intersects the R533 and co-signs with it westwards for 5 kilometres before becoming its own road southwards. It continues south to Sabie, where it passes through the town (meeting the R536) before ending at an intersection with the R37 (Long Tom Pass) to the south of the town.
