= R534 (South Africa) =

Regional route in South Africa

Regional route R534

Route information
- Length: 15 km (9.3 mi)

Major junctions
- North end: R532 near Graskop
- God's Window
- South end: R532 near Graskop

Location
- Country: South Africa

Highway system
- Numbered routes of South Africa
← R533	→ R535

The R534 is a Regional Route in Mpumalanga, South Africa providing access to God's Window.

== Route ==
It is a C-shaped route. It begins approximately 2 kilometres north of Graskop at a junction with the R532 and heads north-north-east to the God's Window tourist site in the Blyde River Canyon Nature Reserve before turning back west to end at another junction with the R532 approximately 9 kilometres north of Graskop.
