= R535 (South Africa) =

Regional route in South Africa

Regional route R535

Route information
- Length: 25.2 km (15.7 mi)

Major junctions
- West end: R533 near Graskop
- East end: R40 near Hazyview

Location
- Country: South Africa

Highway system
- Numbered routes of South Africa
← R534	→ R536

The R535 is a Regional Route in Mpumalanga, South Africa that connects Graskop with Hazyview.

== Route ==
Its western origin is a junction with the R533 approximately 11 kilometres south-east of Graskop and it heads east-south-east for 25 kilometres to end at a junction with the R40 approximately 10 kilometres north of Hazyview, just north of the R40's Sabie River crossing.
