= Hendriksdal =

- Location within Mpumalanga Location within South Africa
- Coordinates: 25.191°S 30.774°E
- Country: South Africa
- Province: Mpumalanga
- District: Ehlanzeni
- Municipality: Thaba Chweu

Area
  - Total: 0.60 km^{2} (0.23 sq mi)

Population (2011)
  - Total: 303
  - Density: 500/km^{2} (1,300/sq mi)

Racial makeup (2011)
  - Black African: 87.8%
  - Coloured: 0.7%
  - White: 11.2%
  - Other: 0.3%

First languages (2011)
  - Swazi: 32.3%
  - Sotho: 20.5%
  - Tsonga: 11.9%
  - Afrikaans: 11.2%
  - Other: 24.1%
- Time zone: UTC+2 (SAST)
- Area code: 013

Hendriksdal is a small village and railway stop in the forested mountains of Thaba Chweu Local Municipality of Mpumalanga province, South Africa.

== Population ==
Historical population
Year	Pop.	±% p.a.
2001	446	—
2010	303	−4.20%
Source: Census 2011 Census 2001
