= Caspersnek Pass =

Mountain pass in South Africa

Coordinates: 24°44′02″S 30°43′09″E

Caspersnek Pass is an untarred Drakensberg pass that straddles the border between the Limpopo and Mpumalanga provinces of South Africa, to connect the Ohrigstad and Blyde valleys.

It offers a shortcut from the town of Ohrigstad to the resort area of Bourke's Luck, and rises to an elevation of 4,600 feet (1,400 m), where it also provides access to the Morgenzon conservation area. It is to the north of the Robbers and Long Tom Pass, and passes between the Mapasebone (6,093 feet (1,857 m)) and Lehwiting (5,472 feet (1,668 m)) heights of the Drakensberg.

The route through the pass was identified by voortrekkers in 1844, but was disfavored due to the lack of available water in winter. The pass was named in honor of Casper Kruger, father of South African Republic president Paul Kruger.

== See also ==
- List of mountain passes of Mpumalanga
