= R533 (South Africa) =

Regional route in South Africa

Regional route R533

Route information
- Length: 80 km (50 mi)

Major junctions
- West end: R36 near Ohrigstad
- R532 in Graskop; R535 near Graskop
- East end: R40 in Bushbuckridge

Location
- Country: South Africa

Highway system
- Numbered routes of South Africa
← R532	→ R534

The R533 is a Regional Route in South Africa that connects Ohrigstad with Bushbuckridge via Graskop.

== Route ==
The R533's western terminus is a junction with the R36 (Verraaiersnek Pass) in Limpopo, approximately 18 kilometres south of Ohrigstad. It head eastwards for 27 kilometres as the Robbers Pass, crossing into Mpumalanga, crossing the Ohrigstad River north of the Ohrigstad Dam, to reach Pilgrim's Rest, where it crosses the Blyde River. The R533 continues south-east for 10 kilometres to reach a junction with the R532. The R532 joins the R533 and they are one road eastwards for 5 kilometres into the town of Graskop before splitting at the Main Street junction in the town. The R532 heads south, then east, then north-east, for 38 kilometres as the Kowyn Pass, meeting the R535, to reach its end at an intersection with the R40 in Bushbuckridge.
