= Bosoord =

- Location within Mpumalanga Location within South Africa
- Coordinates: 25.233°S 30.329°E
- Country: South Africa
- Province: Mpumalanga
- District: Ehlanzeni
- Municipality: Thaba Chweu

Area
  - Total: 0.60 km^{2} (0.23 sq mi)

Population (2011)
  - Total: 1,130
  - Density: 1,900/km^{2} (4,900/sq mi)

Racial makeup (2011)
  - Black African: 99.1%
  - Coloured: 0.6%
  - White: 0.3%

First languages (2011)
  - Swazi: 39.8%
  - Zulu: 26.0%
  - Northern Sotho: 22.4%
  - Sotho: 5.1%
  - Other: 6.6%
- Time zone: UTC+2 (SAST)
- Area code: 013

Bosoord is a village between Lydenburg and Dullstroom in Thaba Chweu Local Municipality of Mpumalanga province, South Africa.
