= Friddah Nkadimeng =

South African politician and former educator (b. 1961)

Executive Mayor of the Thaba Chweu Local Municipality
- Incumbent
- Assumed office 31 May 2019
- Preceded by: Selina Mashego

Member of the National Assembly of South Africa
- In office 21 May 2014 – 7 May 2019
- Constituency: Mpumalanga

Personal details
- Born: 30 October 1961 (age 64) Sabie, Transvaal Province, South Africa
- Party: African National Congress (1991–present)
- Children: 4
- Profession: Politician, educator

Mogotle Friddah Nkadimeng (born 10 October 1961) is a South African politician and former educator serving as the Executive Mayor of the Thaba Chweu Local Municipality in Mpumalanga since 31 May 2019. A member of the African National Congress, she had previously served as a Member of Parliament from 2014 until 2019.

== Early life and education ==
Nkadimeng was born on 10 October 1961 in Sabie in the Transvaal Province. She then moved to Ga Motodi in Burgersfort where she attended primary school. After matriculating, she studied at the Dr CN Pathudi College from which she earned her primary school teacher's diploma.

== Career ==
Nkadimeng started her teaching career at the Mampuru School in Steelpoort. She and her husband then moved to Lydenburg where she began teaching at the Marembane High School. She gradually rose in the school's leadership ranks, going from head of department to acting principal to eventually being appointed as principal.

== Political career ==
Nkadimeng joined the African National Congress in 1991. She stood in the 2014 national elections as an ANC parliamentary candidate from Mpumalanga and was elected to the National Assembly of South Africa and sworn in on 21 May 2014.

During her tenure in Parliament, she was a member of the Portfolio Committee on Higher Education and Training from June 2014 to November 2017, a member of the Portfolio Committee on Communications and Digital Technologies from May 2015 to October 2016 and a member of the Portfolio Committee on Human Settlements from October 2016 to May 2019, when the parliamentary term expired. Nkadimeng was not nominated by the ANC as a parliamentary candidate in the 2019 national elections and left parliament at the dissolution of the parliamentary term on 7 May 2019.

Nkadimeng was elected as mayor of the Thaba Chweu Local Municipality unopposed on 31 May 2019, succeeding Selina Mashego. She was elected to a second term as mayor of municipality following the local government elections held on 1 November 2021. Nkadimeng was elected as an additional member of the Provincial Executive Committee of the South African Local Government Association in Mpumalanga in January 2022.

== Personal life ==
Nkadimeng is married to Frans. She has four children. By 2019, she had eleven grandchildren.
