= Simile, Mpumalanga =

Simile
- Location within Mpumalanga Location within South Africa
- Coordinates: 25.080°S 30.781°E
- Country: South Africa
- Province: Mpumalanga
- District: Ehlanzeni
- Municipality: Thaba Chweu

Area
  - Total: 0.93 km^{2} (0.36 sq mi)

Population (2011)
  - Total: 6,932
  - Density: 7,500/km^{2} (19,000/sq mi)

Racial makeup (2011)
  - Black African: 99.1%
  - Coloured: 0.3%
  - Indian/Asian: 0.2%
  - White: 0.2%
  - Other: 0.2%

First languages (2011)
  - Swazi: 45.3%
  - Sotho: 19.1%
  - Tsonga: 11.8%
  - Northern Sotho: 10.2%
  - Other: 13.6%
- Time zone: UTC+2 (SAST)
- PO box: 1260
- Area code: 013

Simile is the Black township on the northern side of the forestry town Sabie. It falls under the Thaba Chweu Local Municipality of Mpumalanga province, South Africa.
