= Kowyn Pass =

- Location within Mpumalanga Location within South Africa
- Elevation: 1,448 m (4,751 ft)

Third Approach
- Location: between Graskop and Bushbuckridge
- Range: Drakensberg
- Coordinates: 24°57′39″S 30°51′46″E

Kowyn Pass is situated in Mpumalanga province, on the R533 road between Graskop and Bushbuckridge (Bosbokrand), South Africa. The pass was completed on 3 October 1959. It descends from an altitude of 1,448 metres above sea level near Graskop, by 500 metres to Bushbuckridge, which implies an average slope of 1:14.

== History ==
The pass is believed to have been built along an ancient pedestrian route which connected the lowveld to higher areas towards the west. It is named for the 19th century Bakwena chief Kobêng Moxane, who the Voortrekkers referred to as Kowyn. He settled his faction of the Pulana tribe on the Graskop escarpment, after the Swazis scattered them from a former settlement near Pretoriuskop. They were Sotho-speaking people who were initially displaced from the highveld by the disturbances of the Mfecane, and subsequently migrated northwards to escape raids by the Swazis.

== Rock fall shelter ==
A major rock fall occurred in 1973 at a point where the pass skirts a very steep hill. When rock falls continued despite the area being anchored, the Transvaal Provincial Roads Authority decided in 1977 to construct a reinforced concrete rockfall shelter as a permanent and fail-safe protective measure. The construction of the shelter, some 170 metres long, was completed in August 1980.
