= Mpageni Pass =

Mountain pass in South Africa

Mpageni Pass is situated in the Mpumalanga province of South Africa, on the road between Mbombela and Matsulu, South Africa.
