= Bergvlei Pass =

Coordinates: 25.067°S 30.871°E

Bergvlei Pass is situated in the Mpumalanga province of South Africa, on the R536 road between Sabie and Hazyview.
