= Leroro =

Leroro Mphato
- Location within Mpumalanga Location within South Africa
- Coordinates: 24.620°S 30.793°E
- Country: South Africa
- Province: Mpumalanga
- District: Ehlanzeni
- Municipality: Thaba Chweu

Area
  - Total: 3.89 km^{2} (1.50 sq mi)

Population (2011)
  - Total: 4,165
  - Density: 1,070/km^{2} (2,770/sq mi)

Racial makeup (2011)
  - Black African: 99.4%
  - Coloured: 0.5%
  - Indian/Asian: 0.1%

First languages (2011)
  - Northern Sotho: 92.4%
  - Sotho: 2.8%
  - Swazi: 1.0%
  - Other: 3.8%
- Time zone: UTC+2 (SAST)
- PO box: 1273
- Area code: 013

Leroro is a village in Thaba Chweu Local Municipality of Mpumalanga province, South Africa. It is just south of the Blyde River Canyon.
