= R536 (South Africa) =

Regional route in South Africa

Regional route R536

Route information
- Length: 80 km (50 mi)

Major junctions
- West end: R532 in Sabie
- R40 in Hazyview
- East end: Paul Kruger Gate of the Kruger National Park

Location
- Country: South Africa

Highway system
- Numbered routes of South Africa
| ← R535 | → R537 |

The R536 is a Regional Route in Mpumalanga, South Africa that connects Sabie with the Kruger National Park via Hazyview.

== Route ==
Its western terminus is in Sabie at a junction with the R532 (Long Tom Pass; Main Road), just north of the R532's junction with the R37. It heads east as Sabie Road for a few metres and reaches a junction with the R537 before continuing as the Bergvlei Pass. It continues east reaching Hazyview, where it is briefly cosigned with the R40 going south, before continuing east to reach its end at the Paul Kruger Gate of Kruger National Park. For its entire route, it follows the Sabie River.
