= Kaapsehoop Pass =

Kaapsehoop Pass is situated in the Mpumalanga province, on the road between Hemlock and Nelspruit (South Africa). It gets its name from the village of Kaapsehoop.

== See also ==
- Kaapsehoop
