= Moremela =

Moremela Hlabekisa
- Location within Mpumalanga Location within South Africa
- Coordinates: 24.663°S 30.801°E
- Country: South Africa
- Province: Mpumalanga
- District: Ehlanzeni
- Municipality: Thaba Chweu

Area
  - Total: 7.34 km^{2} (2.83 sq mi)

Population (2011)
  - Total: 5,112
  - Density: 696/km^{2} (1,800/sq mi)

Racial makeup (2011)
  - Black African: 98.9%
  - Coloured: 0.7%
  - Indian/Asian: 0.1%
  - White: 0.1%
  - Other: 0.1%

First languages (2011)
  - Northern Sotho: 88.7%
  - English: 2.4%
  - Zulu: 2.0%
  - Sotho: 2.0%
  - Other: 4.9%
- Time zone: UTC+2 (SAST)
- Area code: 013

Moremela is a village in Thaba Chweu Local Municipality of Mpumalanga province, South Africa. It is the nearest settlement to Bourke's Luck Potholes, a scenic place.The place is under Chief F Mogane.
