= Elands Pass =

Mountain pass in Mpumalanga, South Africa

Elands Pass is situated in the Mpumalanga province on the National N4 road (South Africa), the road between Waterval Boven and Nelspruit (South Africa). It is a 1 in 10 descent into the Gamkaskloof valley.
