= Nelshoogte =

Mountain pass in Mpumalanga, South Africa

Coordinates: 25.853°S 30.7616°E

Nelshoogte Pass, also known as Nelsbergpas or Nelshoogte, is situated in the Mpumalanga province, on the Regional Road R38 between Barberton and Carolina (South Africa).

The pass takes its name from the Nelsberg, the mountain on which it is located, and which in turn takes its name from the Nels brothers who founded Mbombela, which was formerly known as Nelspruit.
