= Crossroads Pass =

Crossroads Pass is situated in the Mpumalanga province, on the R36 where it splits off from the N4 road between Machadodorp and Nelspruit (South Africa).
