= Mokobulaan Pass =

Mountain pass in South Africa

Mokobulaan Pass is a mountain pass in Mpumalanga province, South Africa, on the road between Lydenburg and Sudwala.
