= Kranspoort Pass =

Road

Kranspoort Pass is situated in the Mpumalanga province, on the National N11 road (South Africa), main road between Middelburg and Groblersdal (South Africa).
