= Santa Pass =

Mountain pass in Mpumalanga, South Africa

Santa Pass is situated in the Mpumalanga province, on the R540 road between Dullstroom and Lydenburg (South Africa).
