= Hennings Pass =

Coordinates: 25°31′S 30°14′E

Hennings Pass is situated in the Mpumalanga province at Waterval Boven (South Africa). It is classified as a pass but it pretty flat and it ends at a remote farm.
