= Sudwala Pass =

Mountain pass in Mpumalanga, South Africa

Sudwala Pass is situated in the Mpumalanga province, on the R539 road between Sudwala and Lydenburg (South Africa).
