= Kaapsehoop =

Kaapschehoop Alt spelling: Kaapsehoop
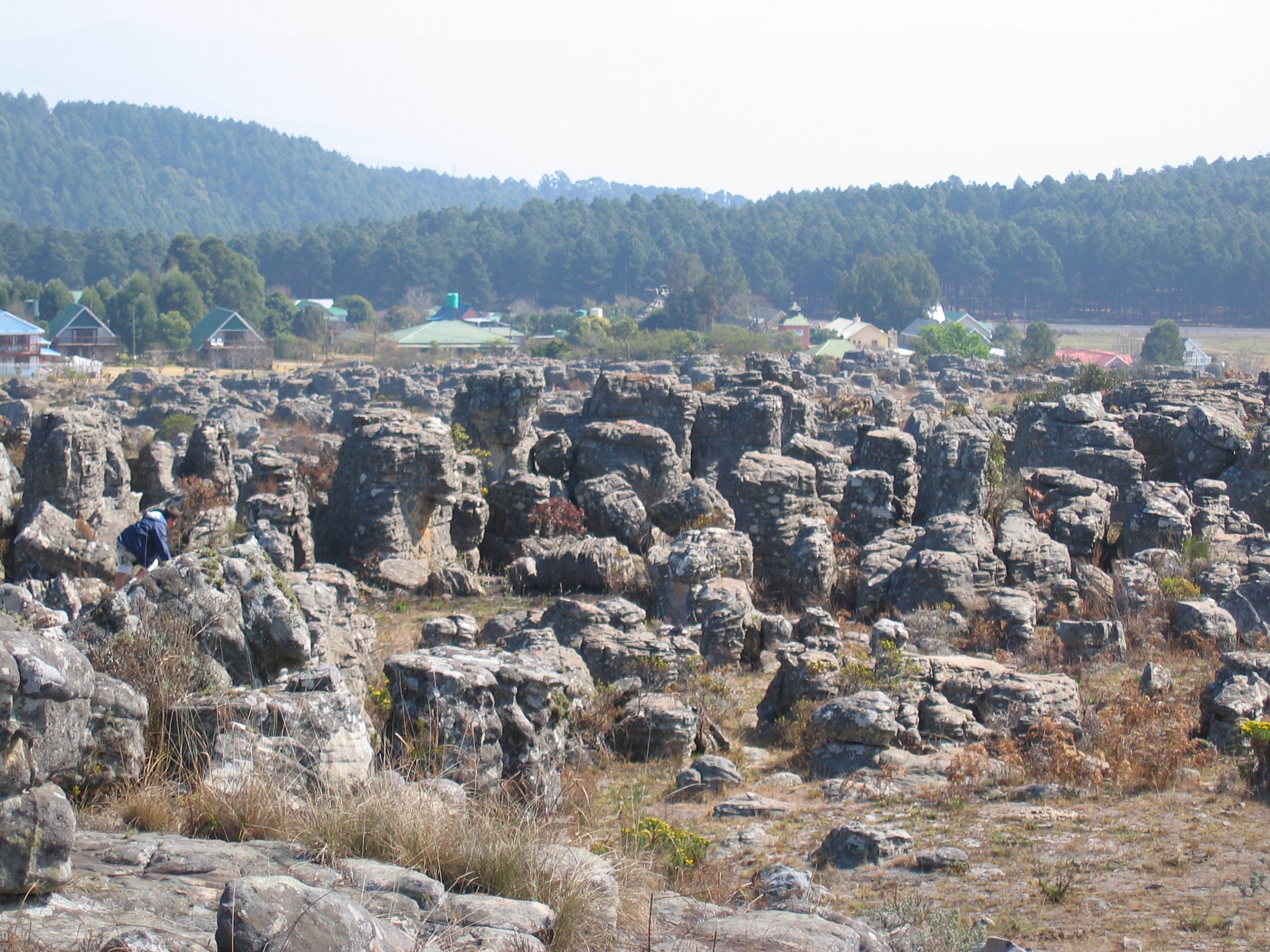
- Rock fields near the town of Kaapschehoop

- Location within Mpumalanga Location within South Africa
- Coordinates: 25°35′S 30°46′E
- Country: South Africa
- Province: Mpumalanga
- District: Ehlanzeni
- Municipality: Mbombela

Area
  - Total: 0.35 km^{2} (0.14 sq mi)

Population (2011)
  - Total: 182
  - Density: 520/km^{2} (1,300/sq mi)

Racial makeup (2011)
  - Black African: 24.7%
  - White: 75.3%

First languages (2011)
  - Afrikaans: 51.1%
  - English: 25.0%
  - Swazi: 20.0%
  - Southern Ndebele: 1.1%
  - Other: 2.8%
- Time zone: UTC+2 (SAST)

Kaapschehoop or Kaapsehoop is a village situated in Mpumalanga province (formerly Eastern Transvaal) of South Africa.

It is situated 1640 m (5380 ft.) above sea level on the Drakensberg Highveld escarpment, about 28 km from Mbombela (also known as Nelspruit), the capital of Mpumalanga. The name of the village was derived from gold discoveries in and around the area. The find created hope for the early inhabitants of the De Kaap Valley (The Cape Valley) below, it offered the chance of attaining great wealth.

Today, Kaapsehoop is a mountain-top village with arts and crafts shops, confectioneries, restaurants, pubs, and accommodation. Its surroundings include nature reserves, golden grasslands, wildflowers, pine plantations, distinctive sandstone formations, flowing streams, and endangered wildlife. The village is situated among large natural clearings in rocky terrain near the top of the escarpment, overlooking the lush De Kaap Valley, approximately 800 metres below. Distant views extend towards Barberton, Mbombela, White River, and Eswatini.

== History ==
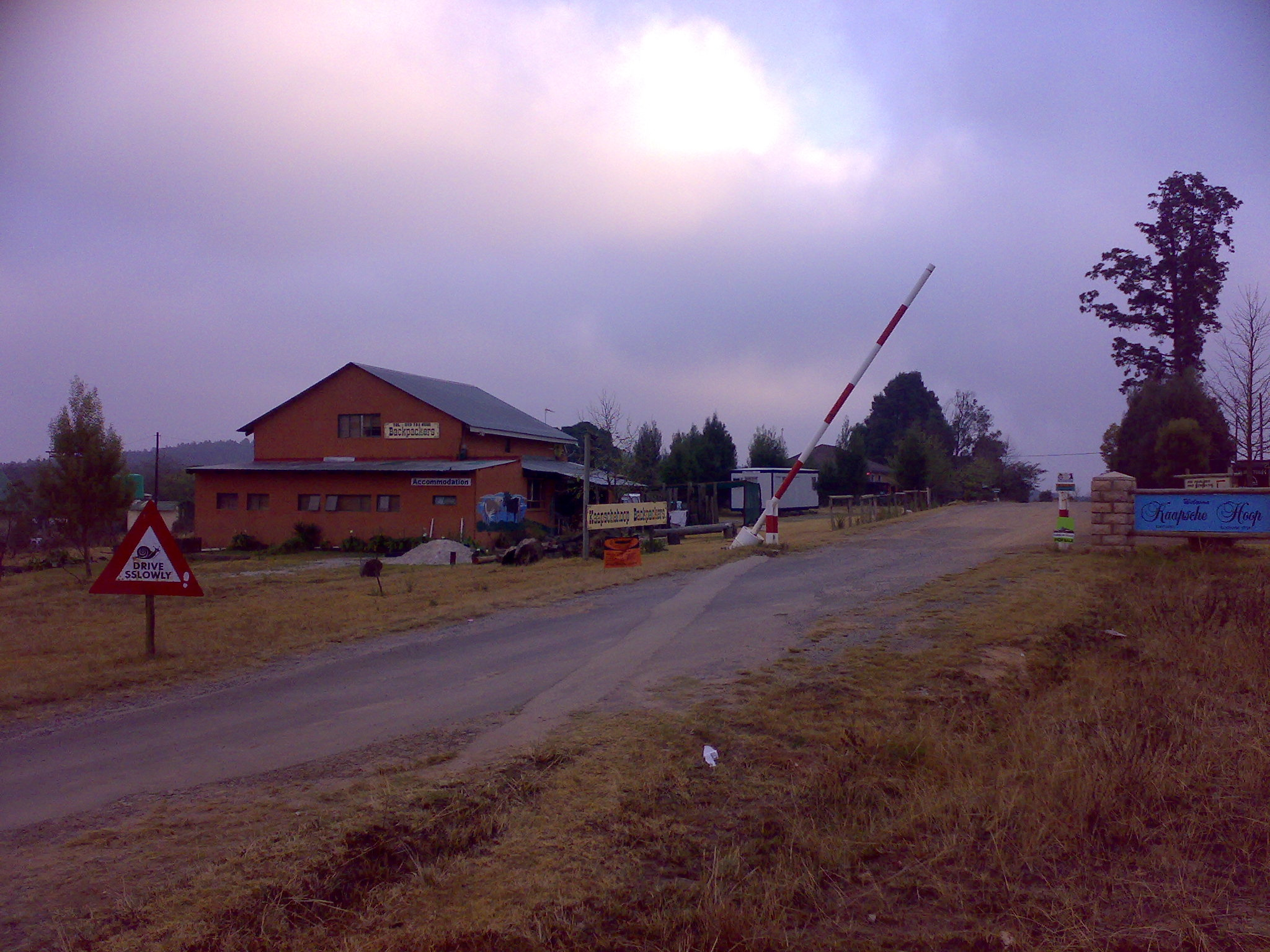
Entrance to Kaapsehoop

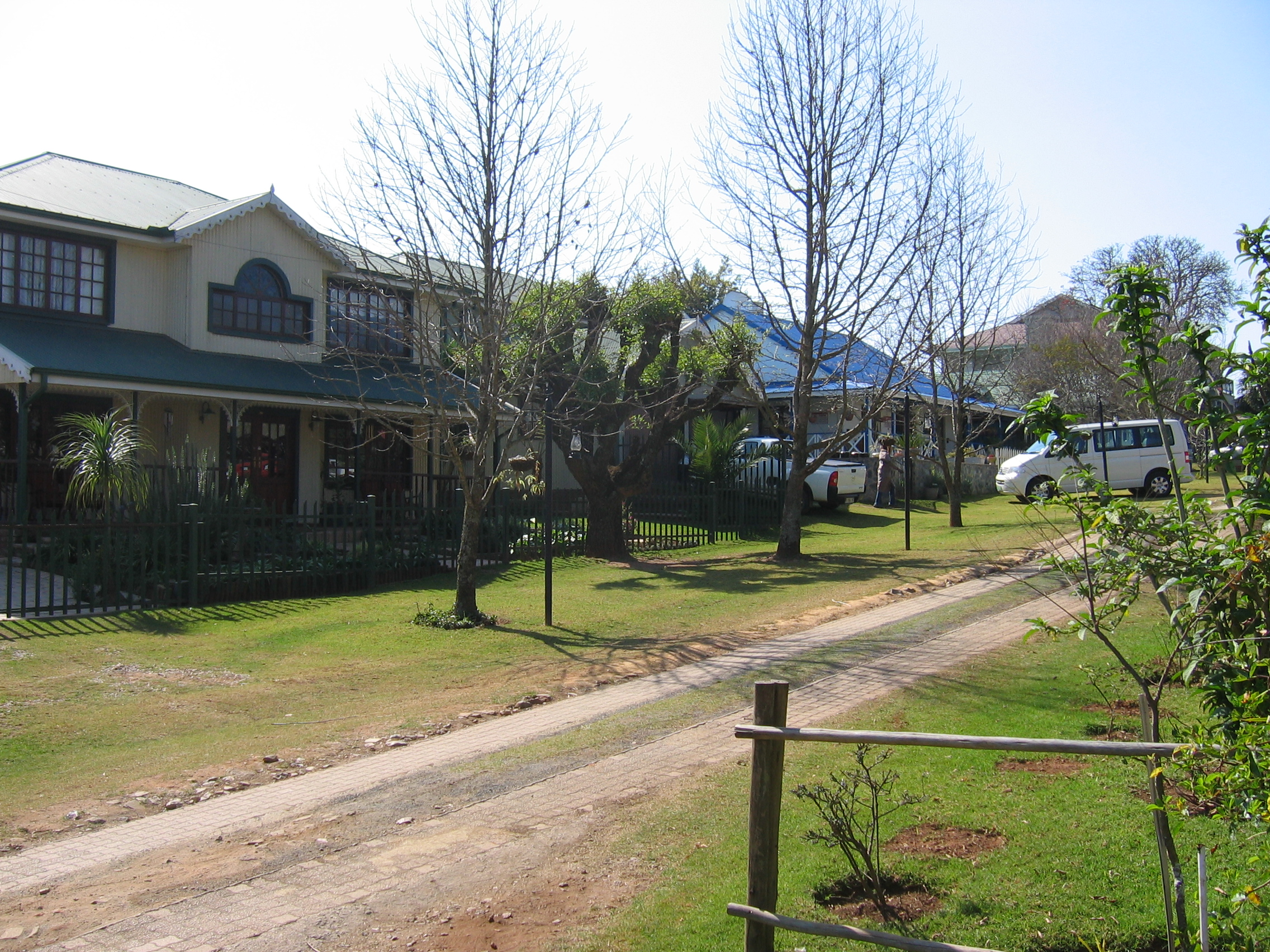
Kaapsehoop streetscape

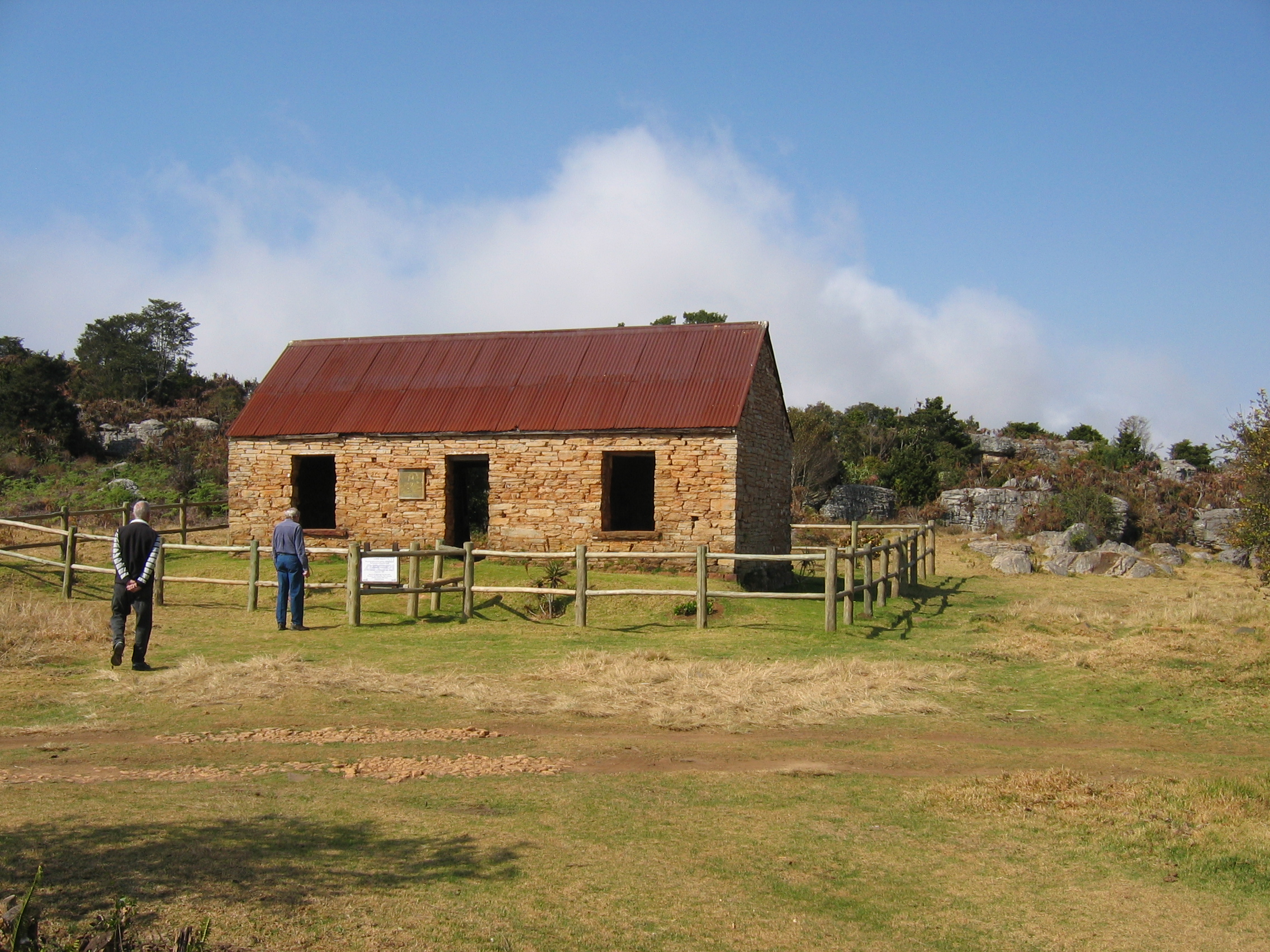
Mining Commissioner's House 1884 Kaapsehoop

Kaapsehoop originally gained fame as a gold mining town once known as the Duiwels Kantoor – the Devil's Office – towards the end of the 19th century, when gold was discovered in 1882 in a small creek running through the town. This led to portion of the original township layout being canceled and opened up for gold diggings. However, the earlier better paying discoveries of gold at both Pilgrim's Rest in 1873 and Barberton in 1881, followed by the discovery of gold on the Witwatersrand in 1886 (later to become the town of Johannesburg), coupled with the meager returns obtained at Kaapsche Hoop led to the town going into decline.

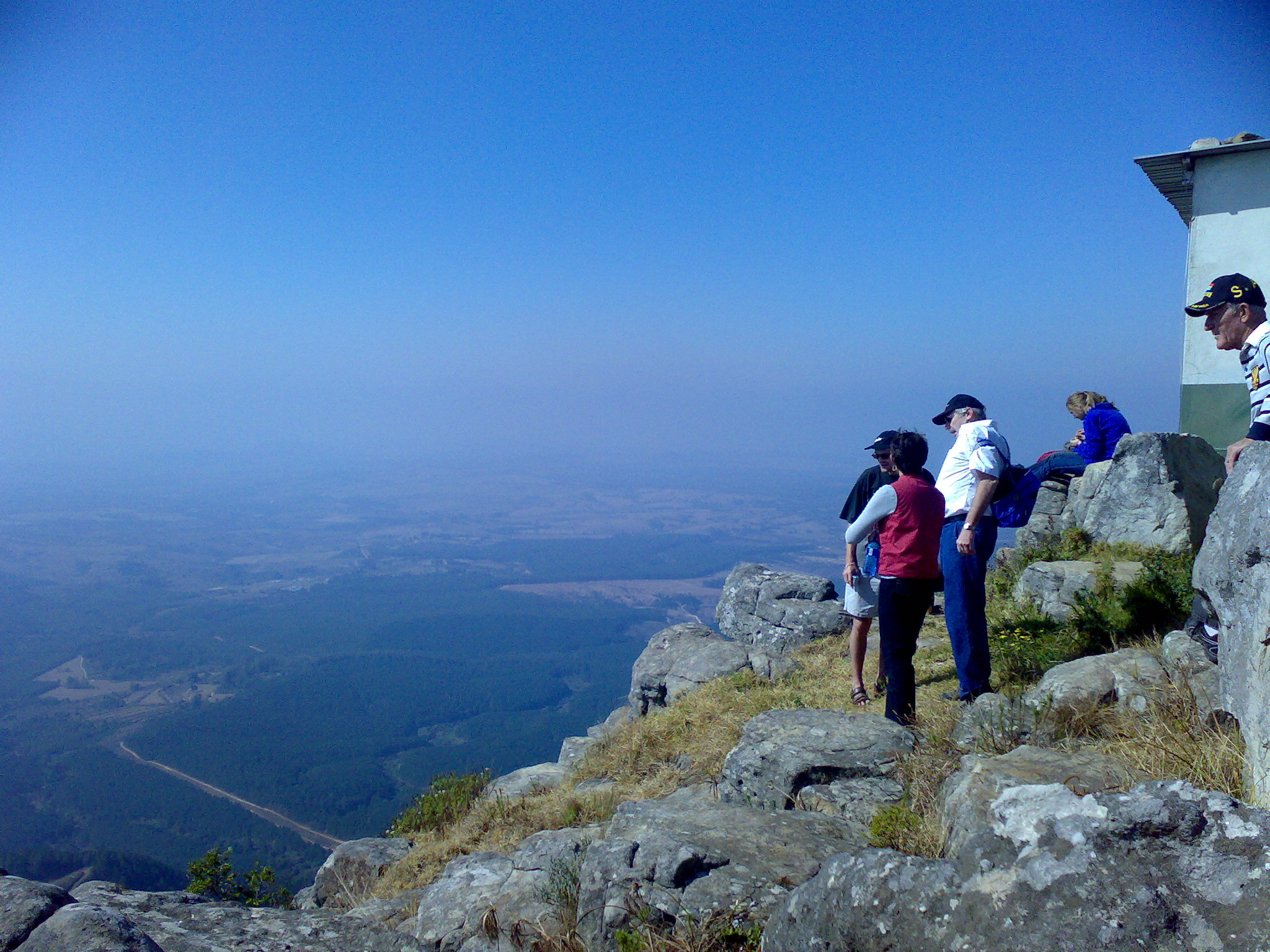
Edge of escarpment overlooking De Kaap valley

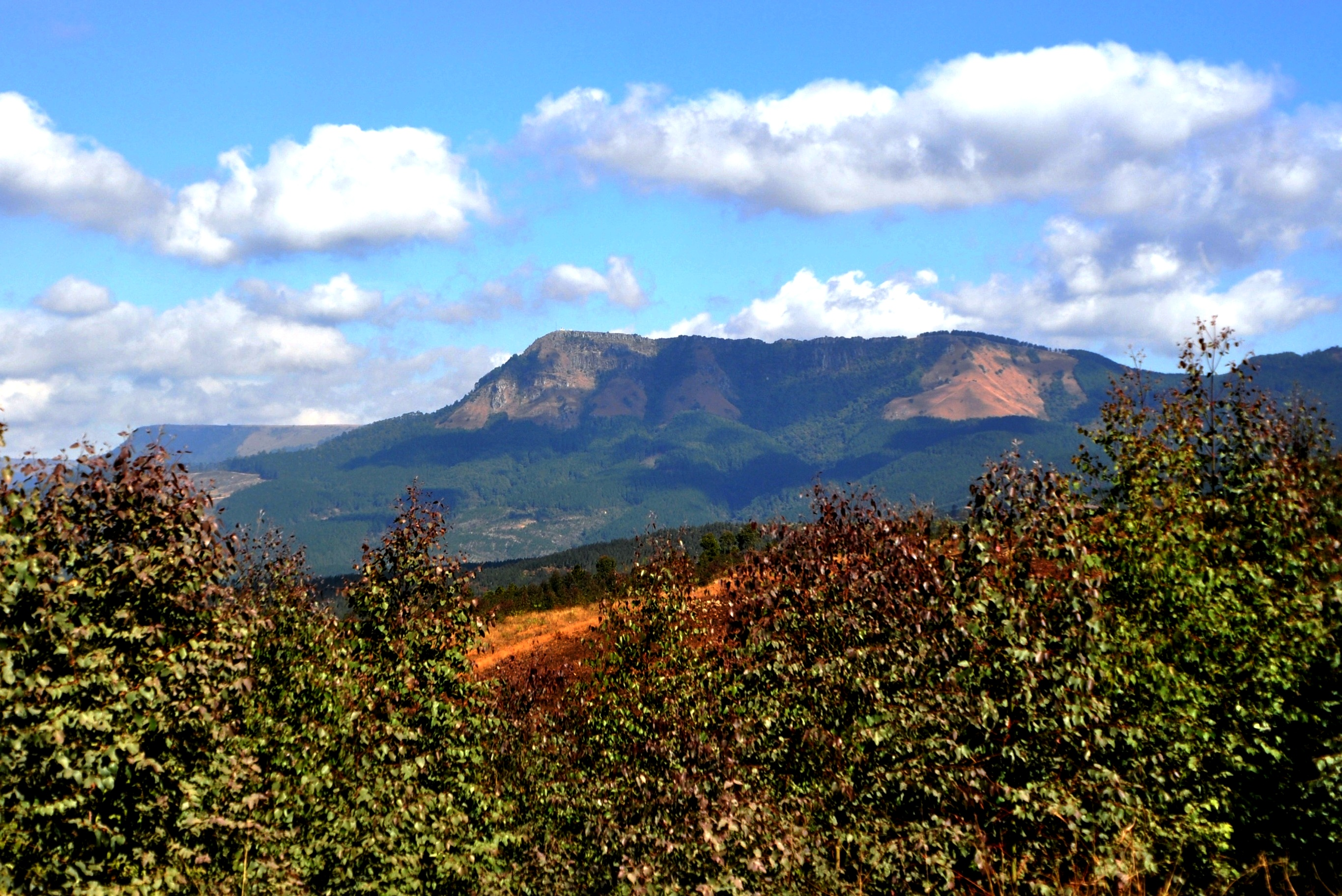
The Kaapsehoop heights seen from below

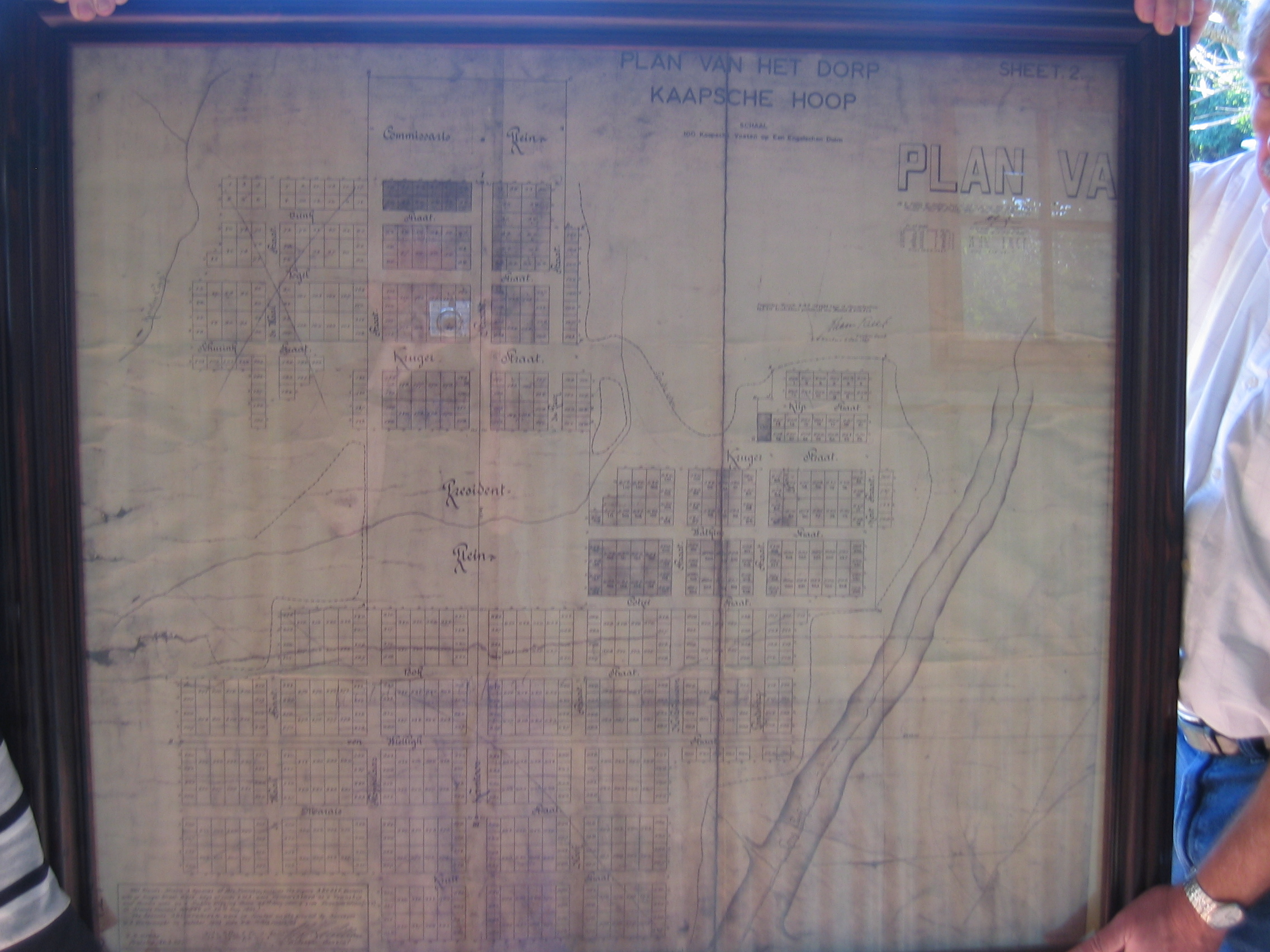
Old Surveyor General Map of Kaapsche Hoop showing diggings area crossed out

The town has been "re-discovered" in recent time and has now become a popular weekend retreat with its period housing including accommodation establishments. New housing (some not period) has also been established on some of the remaining vacant stands (erven). The town is also within commuting distance of the centre of Mbombela situated some 30 odd kilometres away.

The rock field formations near the town are made up of quartzites of the Black Reef Formation of the Transvaal Supergroup.

== Origin of the name ==
Kaapschehoop has had multiple names and spellings since 1874 and the discovery of gold. Kaapsche Hoop is the original Dutch spelling of Kaapsehoop as now spelled in Afrikaans.

It was first known as Duiwels Kantoor (Devils Office) and later changed to Kaapsche Hoop (Cape Hope) due to objections by the church that the former was considered a "heathen" name by the standards of the time.

The village is sometimes referred to in past documents as De Kaap (The Cape) because of its landmass jutting into De Kaap valley (The Cape valley). The valley often fills with cloud, resulting in the image of a coastal cape jutting out into the ocean.

Marthinus Wessel Pretorius of the Transvaal Repbublic, when visiting Duiwels Kantoor, was reminded of the view from Table Mountain. Encouraged by the discoveries of gold, he renamed the settlement to Kaapsche Hoop in 1886.

The name of the town was no doubt derived from the fact that gold was discovered in the town which sits high above the De Kaap Valley (The Cape Valley) and the find then created the hope for the early inhabitants of the nearby De Kaap Valley area of attaining great wealth.

Dutch was the official language of the two original Boer Republics of the Orange Free State or Oranje-Vrijstaat and the South African Republic or Suid Afrikaanse Republiek or Zuid-Afrikaansche Republiek (ZAR). Dutch was eventually to be replaced by Afrikaans a colloquially spoken language of many of the European descended settlers. Afrikaans was largely derived from Dutch and incorporating words derived or adopted from French, German, English and indigenous African languages.
