= Montrose Pass =

Mountain pass in South Africa

Montrose Pass is situated in the Mpumalanga province, on the National N4 road (South Africa) between Nelspruit and Waterval Boven (South Africa).
