= R537 (South Africa) =

Regional route in South Africa

Regional route R537

Route information
- Length: 43.7 km (27.2 mi)

Major junctions
- North-west end: R536 in Sabie
- South-east end: R40 in White River

Location
- Country: South Africa

Highway system
- Numbered routes of South Africa
← R536	→ R538

The R537 is a Regional Route in Mpumalanga, South Africa that connects Sabie with White River.

== Route ==
Its north-western terminus is a junction with the R536 in Sabie (just east of the town centre) and it runs south-east for 44 kilometres to end at an intersection with the R40 in White River (just west of the town centre).
