= Verraaiersnek Pass =

Mountain pass in Mpumalanga, South Africa

Verraaiersnek Pass (Afrikaans: Verraaiersnekpas) is situated in the Mpumalanga province, on the Regional road R36 (Mpumalanga) between Lydenburg and Ohrigstad (South Africa).
