= Robbers Pass =

Coordinates: 24.8711°S 30.6922°E

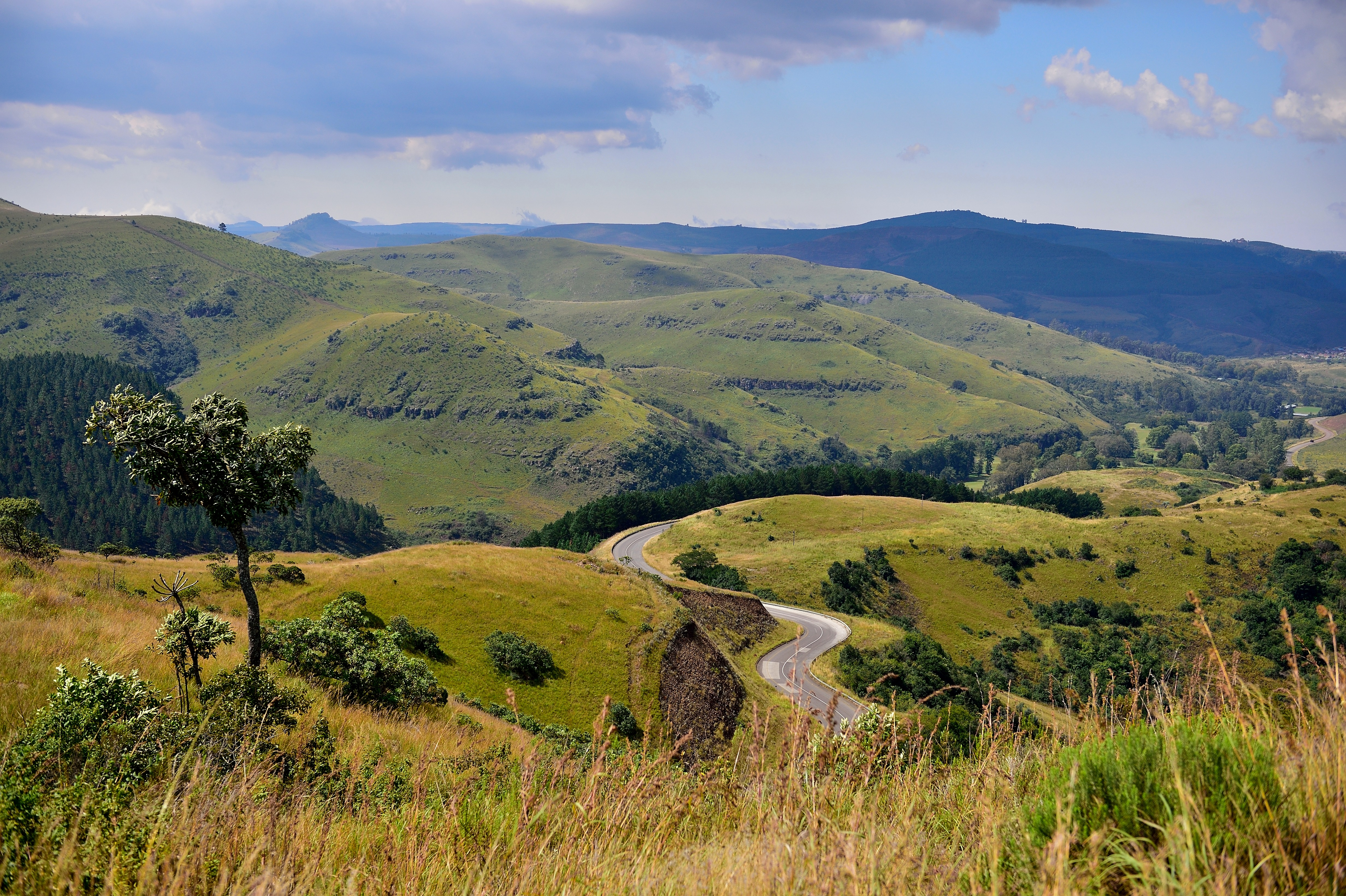
View over Robbers Pass and vicinity

Robbers Pass is situated in the Mpumalanga province, on the R533 between Ohrigstad and Pilgrims Rest (South Africa).

The pass offers diverse scenery through an area steeped in history and stories of robbers who found gold in the area. Landmarks include the Robbers Grave which is near Pilgrims Rest, a village from the gold discovery days that is now preserved as a tourist attraction.

In 1897 two masked and armed highwaymen held up the stage coach and robbed it of £10 000 worth of gold.

They were never brought to justice. The second robbery (in the exact same spot) happened 15 years later (1912). On 20 October 1969 The Star published the first-hand recollection of Willem Albertus Koeleman.

He was in the coach on that particular day. Koeleman and his brother, Ben Koeleman, were the owners of the W & B Koeleman Hotel at Krugerspost. Krugerspost was a well-known halfway station between Ohrigstad and Lydenburg. Stage coaches stopped there a few times a day on their way to the Pilgrim’s Rest gold fields and Lorenzo Marques (Mozambique).

This was Koeleman’s first-hand recollection of the robbery:

"It happened in the early moning of 9 December 1897, not far from Pilgrim’s Rest on top of a steep hill knows as Poniesnek. I was 26 and on my way to Lydenburg. A piece of rusted corrugated iron had damaged the hoof of my horse and I had to take the stage coach. My employer handed me about R16 000 in gold and cheques to take to Lydenburg. I also had some money of my own. "Three other travellers from Pilgrim’s Rest was also in the coach and they had gold bars to the value of R24 000 with them. It was still early and a thick mist covered the mountains as the mule-drawn coach slowly wound its way uphill. On top of Poniesnek the driver pulled the mules to a halt at the usual resting place. It was a sandy patch of level ground, surrounded by a large number of boulders.

"Suddenly the coach doors flew open and two masked men and an armed highwayman shouted at us with their pistols in hand, to put our hands up. We did as we were told and they ordered us out of the coach to one of the boulders where they bound and gagged us. I was so frightened. I left the leather bag of our employers in the coach.

"A second masked man appeared and ordered one of the traders on the coach to move the five boxes out of the coach and put it in bags. Then they came to us and took all our personal cash.

"The robbers then unharnessed the mules, jumped on their horses and disappeared in the mist. I walked to the coach and luckily my employers’ bag of money was still lying on the seat in the coach.

"The mining commissioner JJ Joubert arrived some time later with a number of armed men. They followed the robbers to Sabie and found their horses in the bush. The robbers were never found, neither was the gold. But there were strong rumours that the new barman in Pilgrim’s Rest had a finger in the pie. Nothing could be proved. But an old worked-out gold mine suddenly came to life and produced rich ore. A new company was formed to buy the mine."

The location where the robbery took place was renamed as Robber’s Pass.

It connects Pilgrim’s Rest to Ohrigstad and the R533.
