= Matsulu =

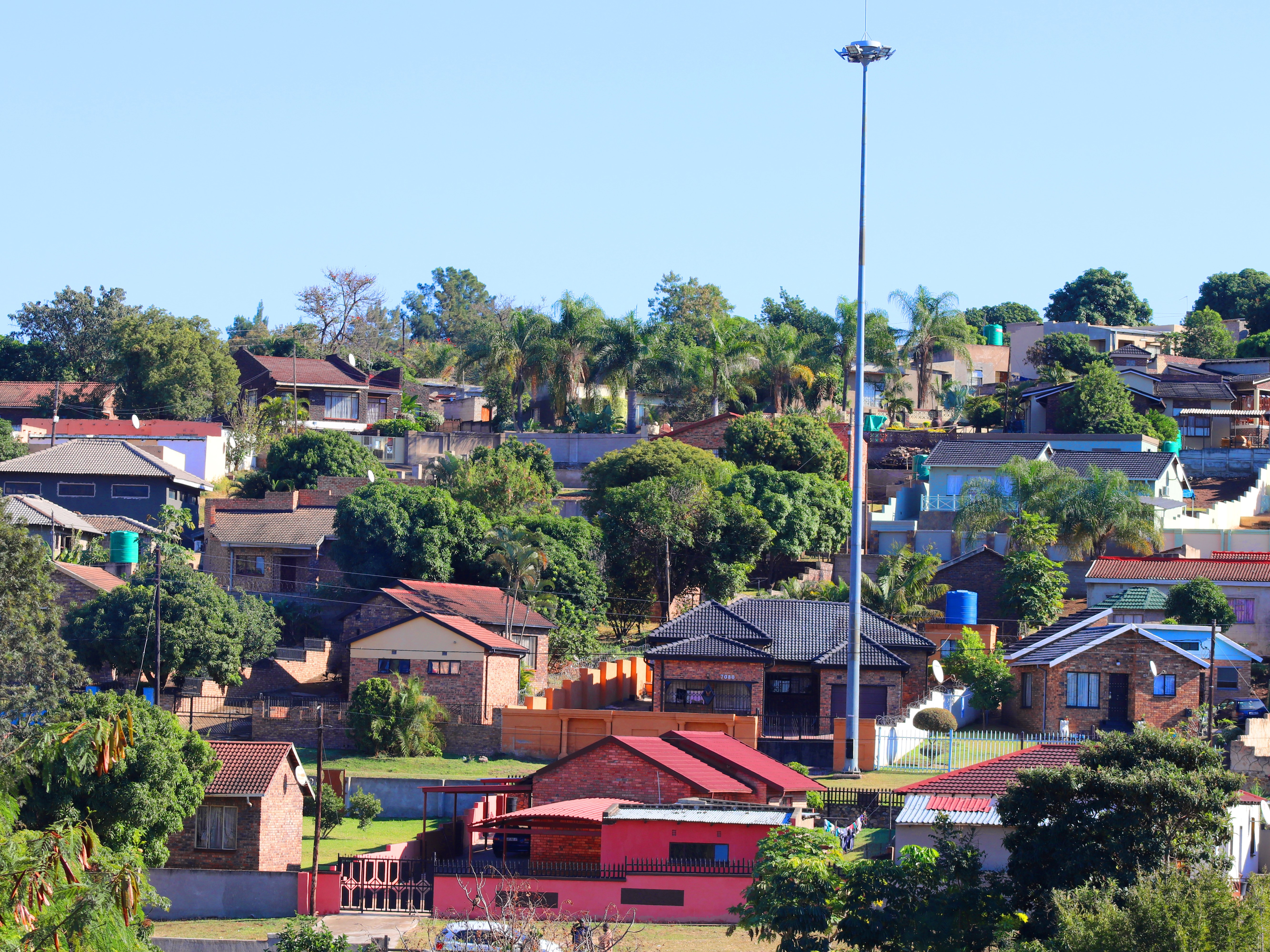
- View of Matsulu-C

- Location within Mpumalanga Location within South Africa
- Coordinates: 25.515°S 31.340°E
- Country: South Africa
- Province: Mpumalanga
- District: Ehlanzeni
- Municipality: Mbombela
- Established: 1970s (unclear)

Government
  - Type: Representative
  - Councillor: (African National Congress)

Area
  - Total: 17.98 km^{2} (6.94 sq mi)

Population (2011)
  - Total: 47,306
  - Density: 2,631/km^{2} (6,814/sq mi)

Racial makeup (2011)
  - Black African: 99.5%
  - Coloured: 0.2%
  - Indian/Asian: 0.1%
  - White: 0.1%
  - Other: 0.1%

First languages (2011)
  - SiSwati: 92.8%
  - Tsonga: 2.5%
  - English: 1.8%
  - Zulu: 1.1%
  - Other: 1.9%
- Time zone: UTC+2 (SAST)
- Postal code (street): 1203
- PO box: 1203
- Area code: 013

Matsulu is a township in the Mbombela Local Municipality under the Ehlanzeni District Municipality in the Mpumalanga province of South Africa. It lies between Kruger National Park and the N4 national road 41 kilometres (25 mi) east of Mbombela (previously known as Nelspruit), 3 kilometres (2 mi) before the Kaapmuiden train station. It is also flanked by the Nsikazi River on the east & the Crocodile River on the south.

The township is divided into three sections: Matsulu-A, Matsulu-B and Matsulu-C.

== History ==
The township was established in the 1970s. Its existence came to be when African natives were forcefully removed from the nearby lands to form sugarcane plantations then relocated to the land which now forms Matsulu Township. It is alleged that the area was named after a resident who had informally settled there prior to the forced allocation; the name of the resident was Matsulu.

From the 1970s to 1994 the township was administrated by the now defunct KaNgwane District Bantustan. It played a major role as an official residency for Members of Parliament (KaNgwane District Bantustan).

Like many South African townships, Matsulu was embroiled in Apartheid-era violence during the 1980s and the early '90s. In 1994 the administration of the township was handed over to the then Greater Nelspruit City Council, ending the Bantustan administration.

== Post 1994 ==
Matsulu was re-organised and municipal wards were allocated to streamline it with the rest of the City Council (now called Mbombela Municipality).

== Economy ==
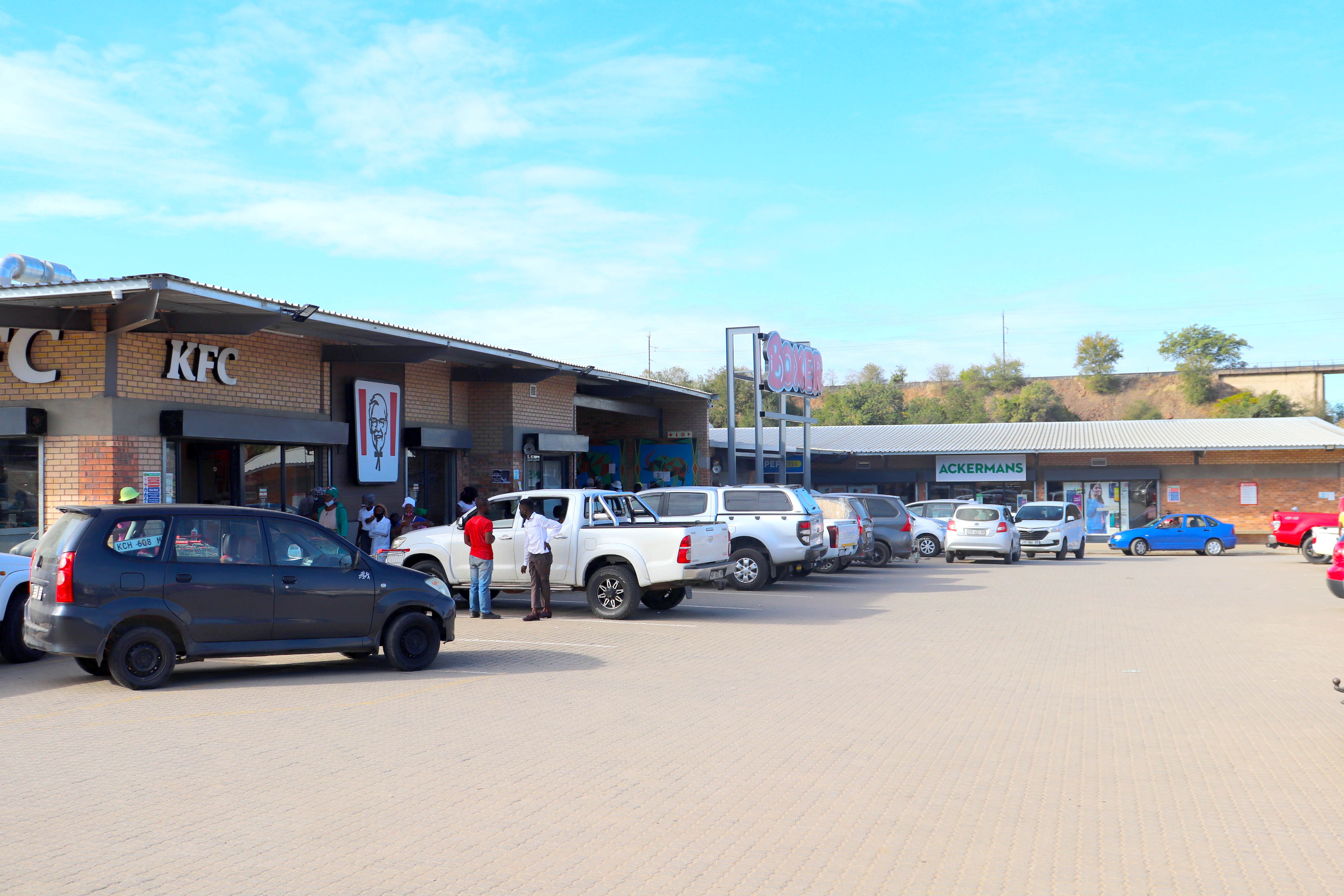
Matsulu Boxer Complex

The township's economy is heavily dependent on its mother city, Mbombela, where most of its employed skilled and semiskilled residents work. The township's economy itself is largely informal. A few hundred find employment in primary economy sectors like brick manufacturing and bricklaying, while some people are also employed on the nearby fruit farms as seasonal workers.

Corner shops known as spaza shops are found scattered throughout the area which are often owned and operated by foreigners like Somali, Ethiopian and Pakistani immigrants on leased residential sites.

There is two (2) formal shopping complexes with a dozen shops anchored by the Spar and Boxer retailer. However, there is no dedicated CBD, nor industrial site, so many businesses operate unregulated at random locations with little municipal control.

== Educational Institutions ==
Public education institutions in Matsulu:

Primary Schools

- Benjamin Primary School
- Enzani Primary School
- Funindlela Primary School
- Lethakuthula Primary School
- Matsulu Primary School
- Phumalanga Primary School
- Sehlulile Primary School
- Sibongile Primary School
- Sukumani Primary School
- Takheleni Primary School
- Tsandzanani Primary School

High Schools

- Tikhontele Secondary School
- Sibusisiwe Secondary School
- Masitakhe Secondary School
- Sitfokotile Secondary School

Tertiary

- Matsulu TVET Skills Academy

== Transportation ==
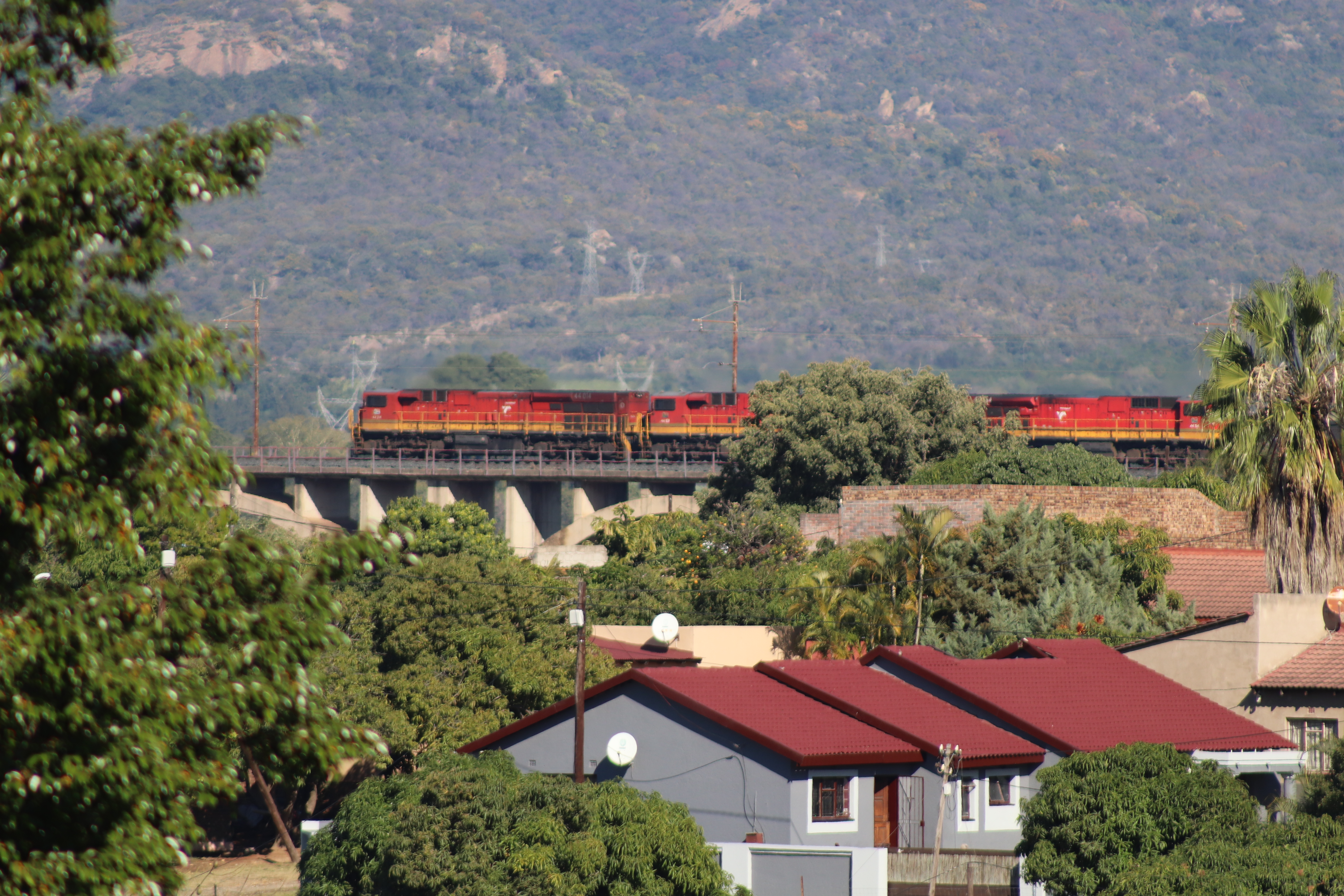
Transnet Train passing through Matsulu

Ways to get in-and-around Matsulu while using public transportation:

- Minibus taxis, which operate on a short-range distance from Matsulu to Mbombela (Nelspruit), Malelane and back.
- Buscor buses, which operate on a medium distance from Matsulu to Mbombela (Nelspruit), Malelane, Barberton and back.
- Local taxis/private cars, which only operate in and around Matsulu, serving the three sections of the township. These local taxis take the form of Toyota Avanzas and they transport locals on tarred/paved roads, ignoring the gravel.
- Air, utilising the Kruger Mpumalanga International Airport with flights from major cities in Southern Africa, Matsulu is 40 km east of the airport.
- Railway utilising the Kaapmuiden train station which is 3 km outside Matsulu. It should be of note that the train arrives only once a day at around 18h00 local time coming from Johannesburg.

== Gallery ==
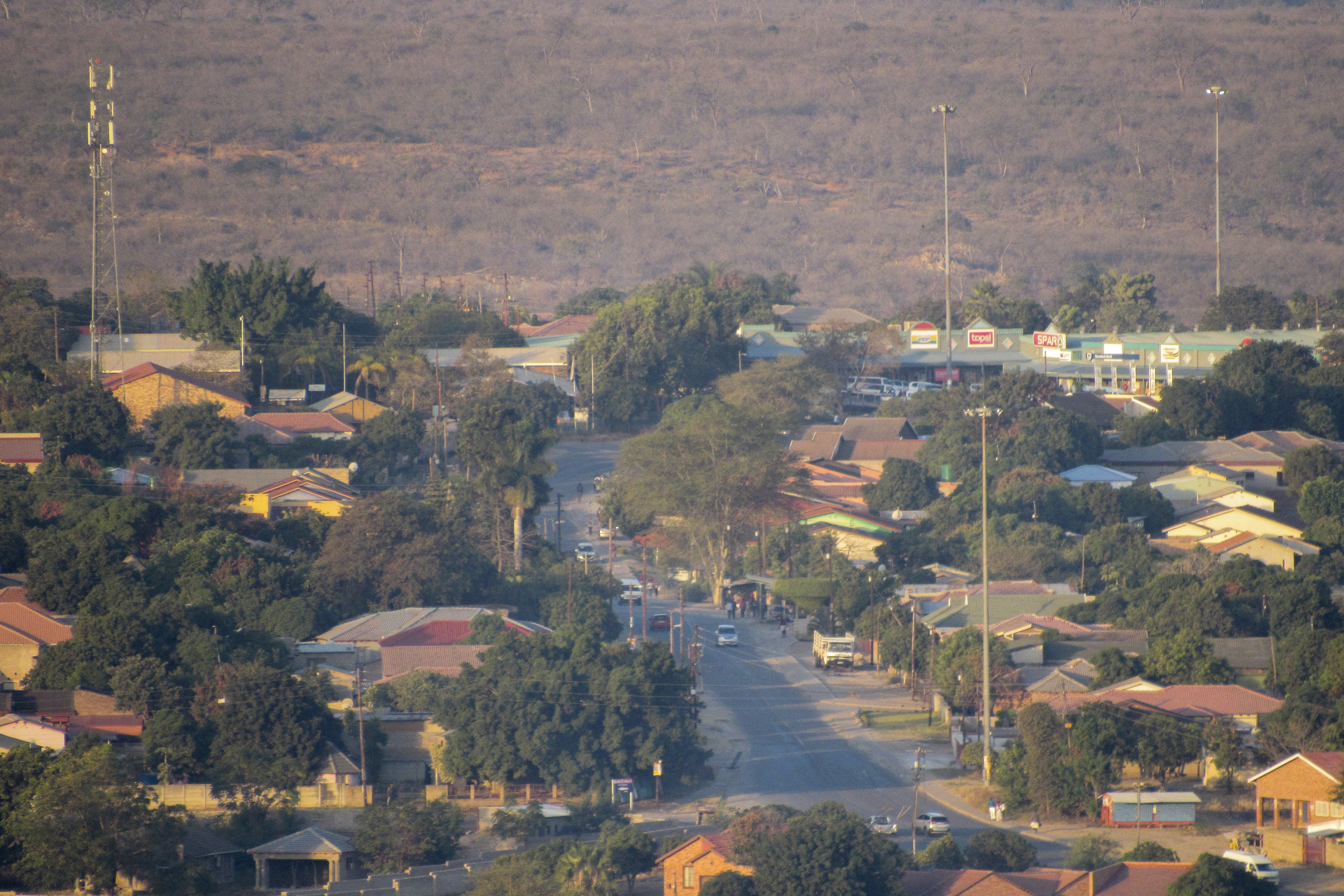
A view of Matsulu-A with the Kruger National Park in the background during the dry season

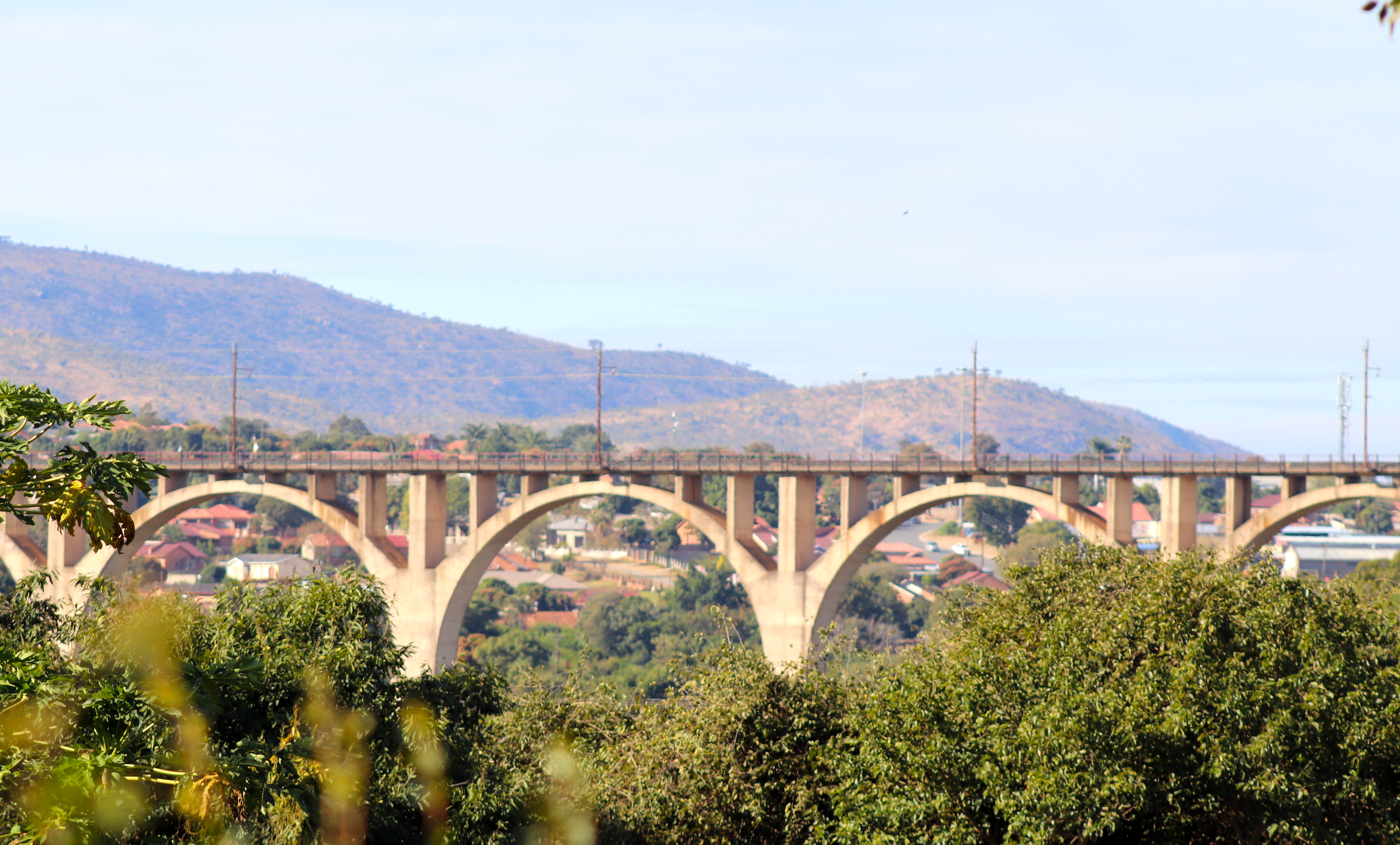
Matsulu Transnet Bridge, a symbolic landmark

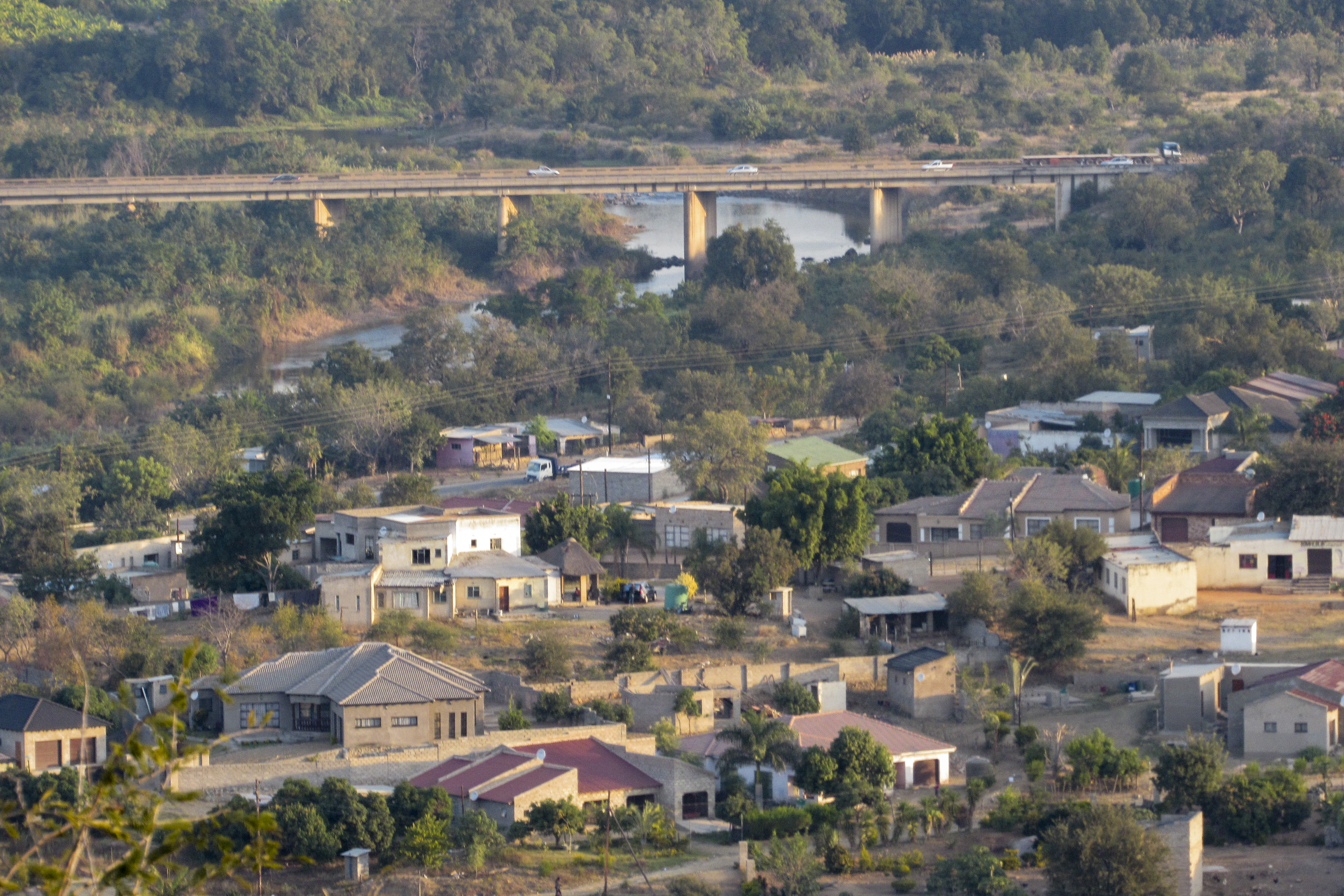
Matsulu-B (Youth Center) with the Crocodile River and the N4 route bridge visible

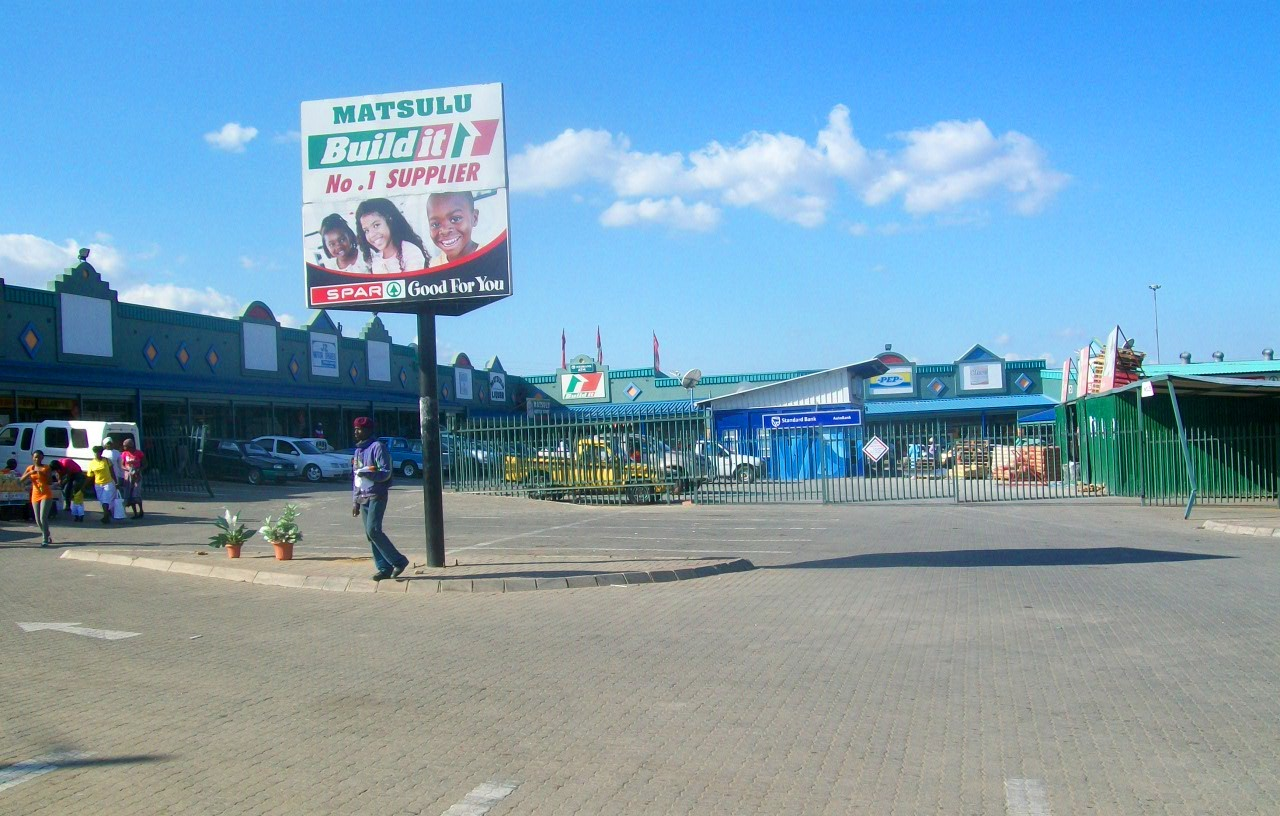
Matsulu Spar Shopping Center

== Climate ==
Matsulu has a subtropical climate with very warm humid summers and cool dry winters.

== Nearby Places of Interest ==
Tourist attractions within a 150 km radius:

- Kruger National Park
- Mthethomusha Game Reserve
- Sudwala Caves

== Notable people ==
- Eric Kholwane, former Mpumalanga MEC for Finance, Economic Development and Tourism
