= Hazyview =

Hazyview Magashula
- Location within Mpumalanga Location within South Africa
- Coordinates: 25°02′35″S 31°07′45″E
- Country: South Africa
- Province: Mpumalanga
- District: Ehlanzeni
- Municipality: Mbombela

Area
  - Total: 22.69 km^{2} (8.76 sq mi)

Population (2011)
  - Total: 4,236
  - Density: 186.7/km^{2} (483.5/sq mi)

Racial makeup (2011)
  - Black African: 47.7%
  - Coloured: 0.9%
  - Indian/Asian: 7.4%
  - White: 43.1%
  - Other: 0.9%

First languages (2011)
  - Afrikaans: 33.7%
  - Tsonga: 19.7%
  - English: 16.7%
  - Swazi: 9.9%
  - Other: 20.0%
- Time zone: UTC+2 (SAST)
- Postal code (street): 1242
- PO box: 1242
- Area code: 013

Hazyview is a sub-tropical farming town in Mpumalanga, South Africa.

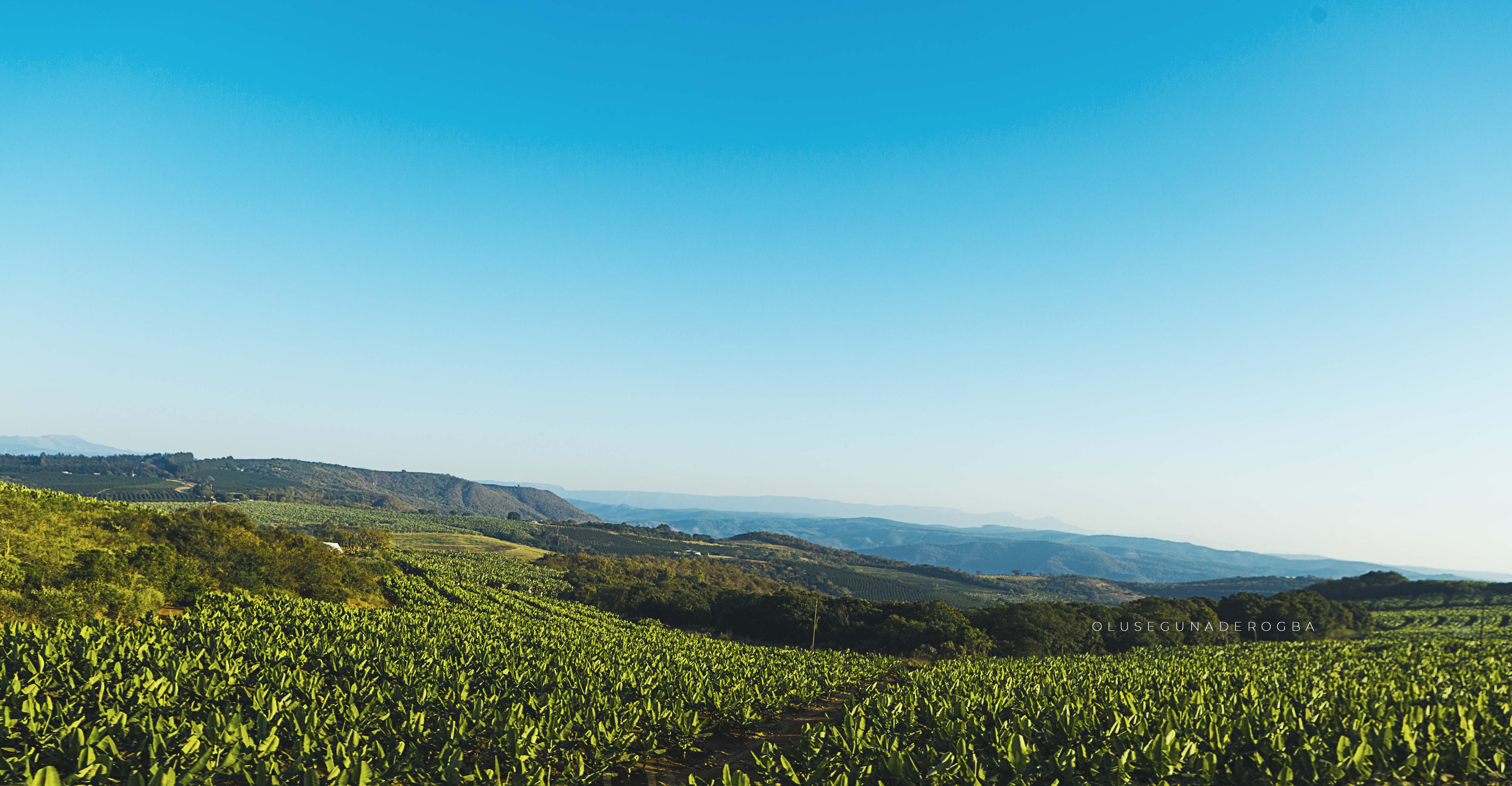
Banana Plantations in Hazyview

== Gallery ==
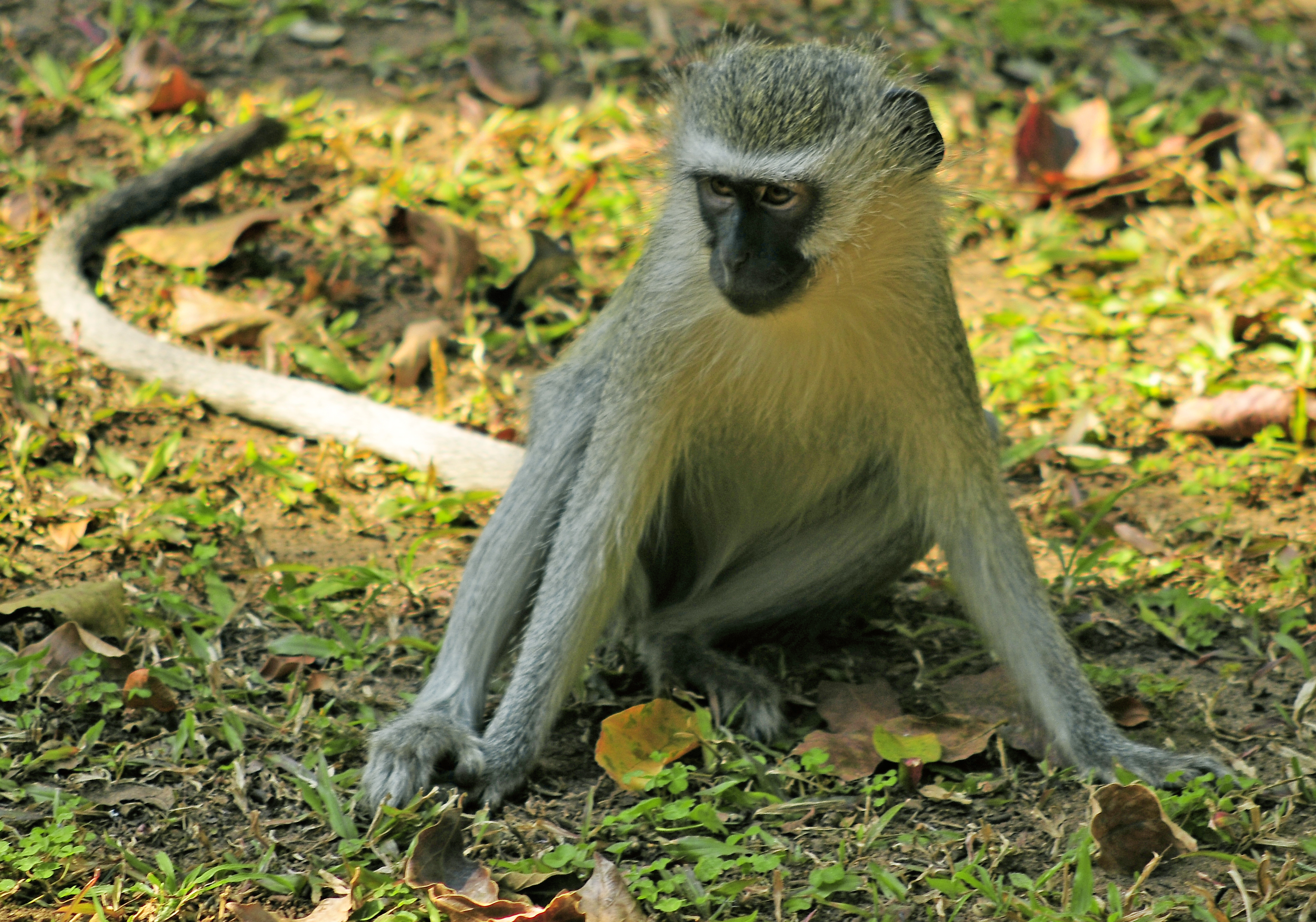
Vervet monkeys are common in Hazyview

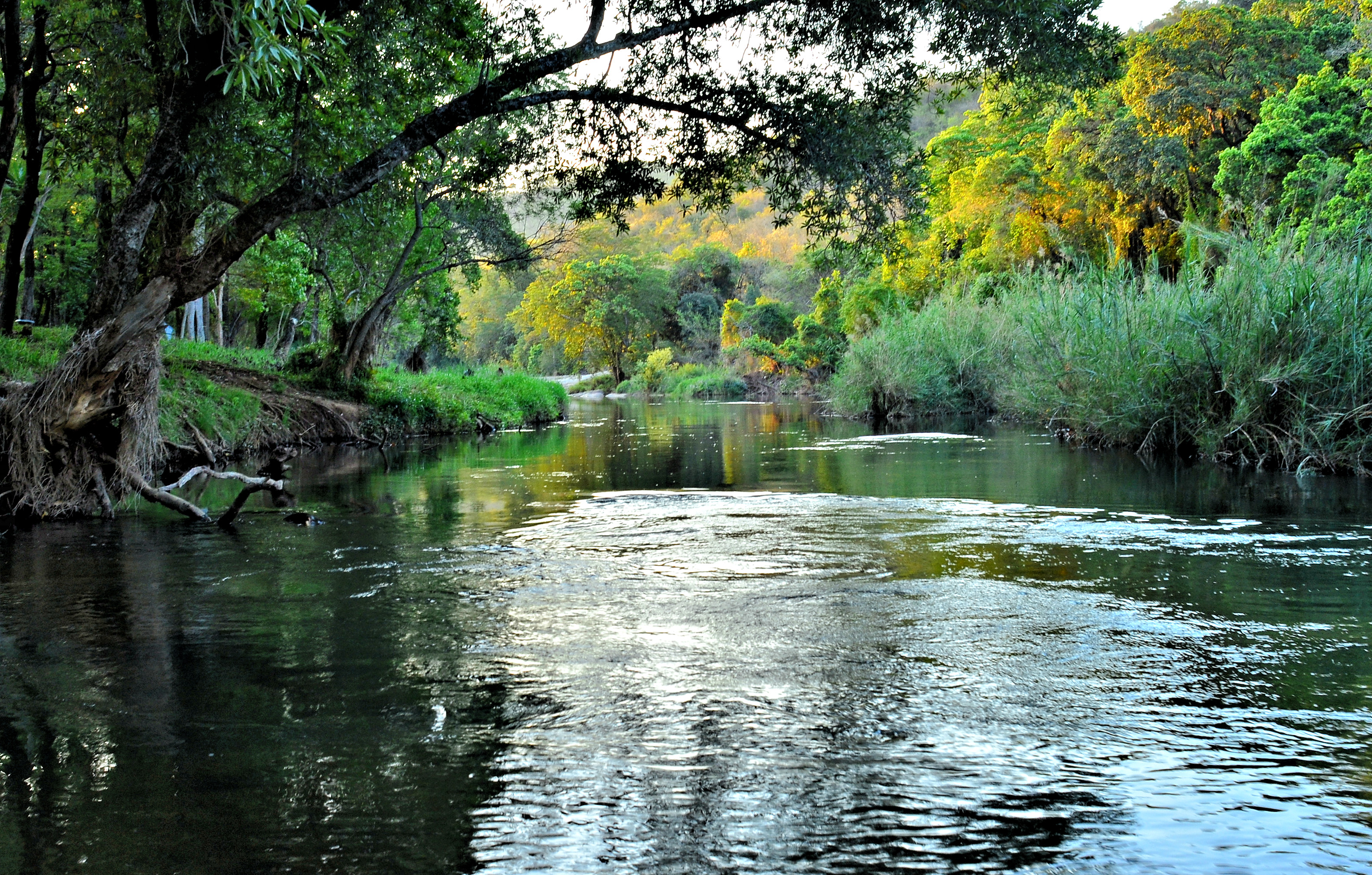
Hazyview is situated along the Sabie River

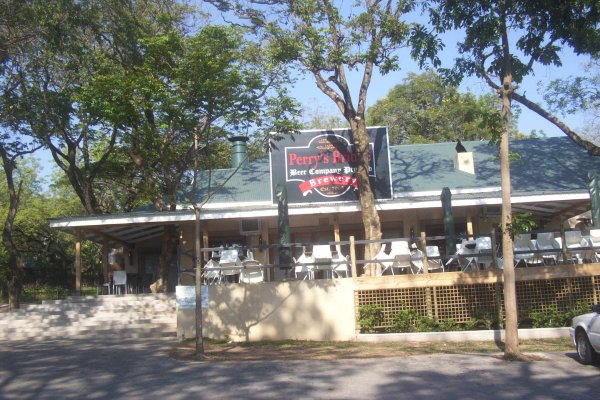
Perry's Bridge, a shopping and tourist centre in Hazyview

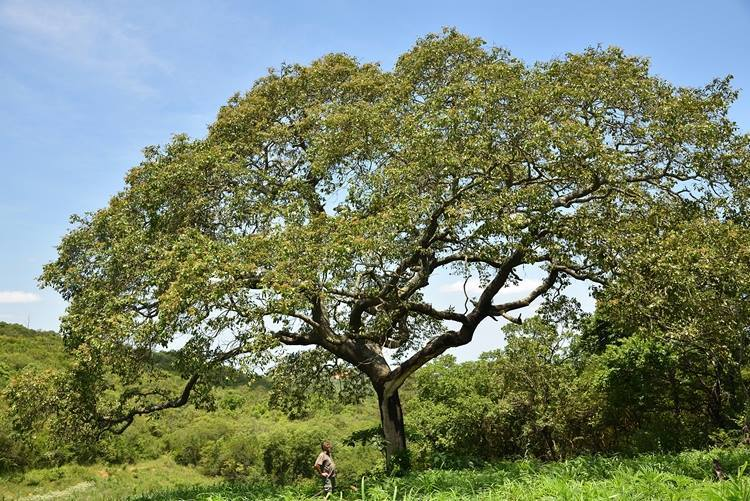
A mabola plum (Parinari curatellifolia) tree near Hazyview

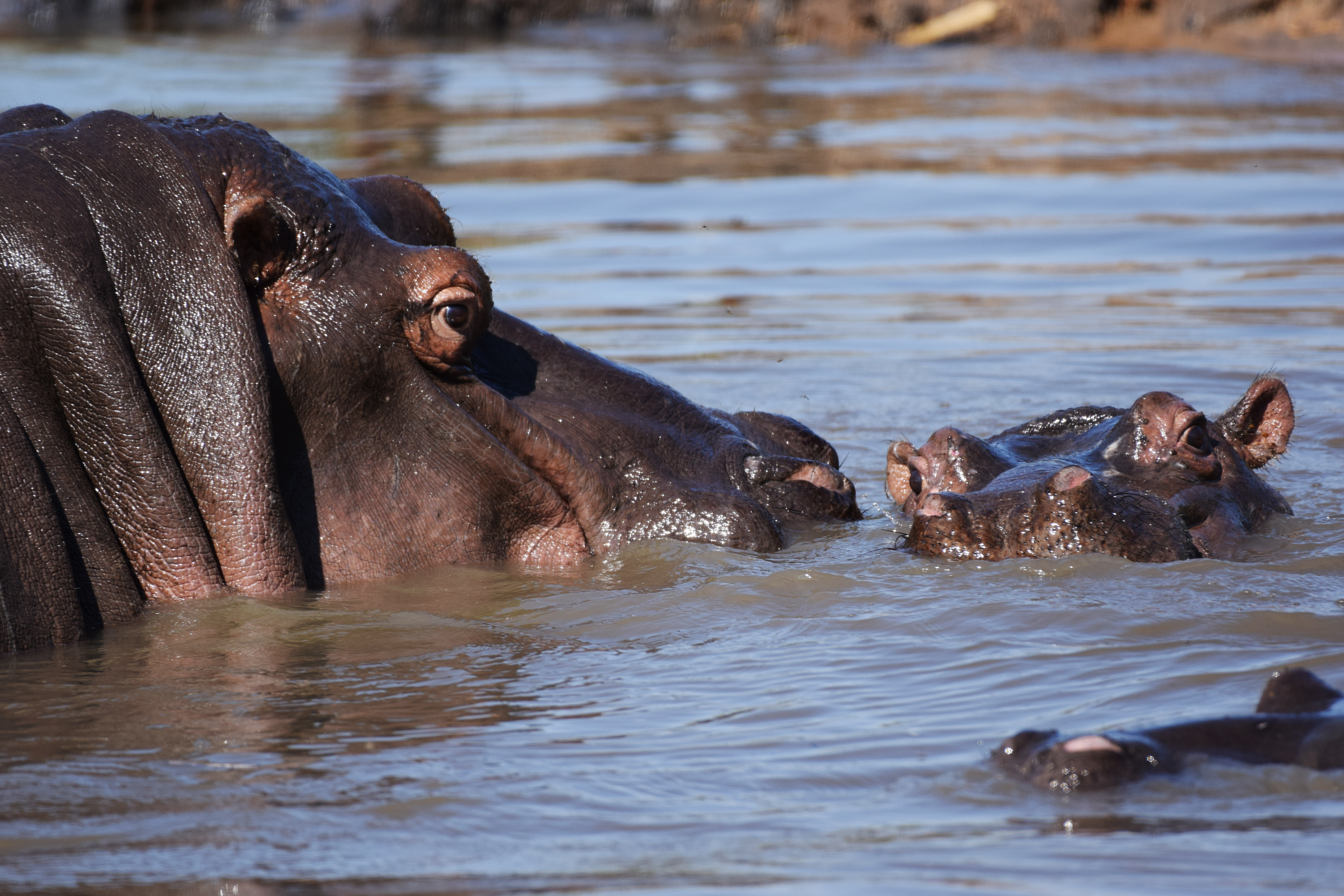
There are many hippos that live in the rivers near Hazyview

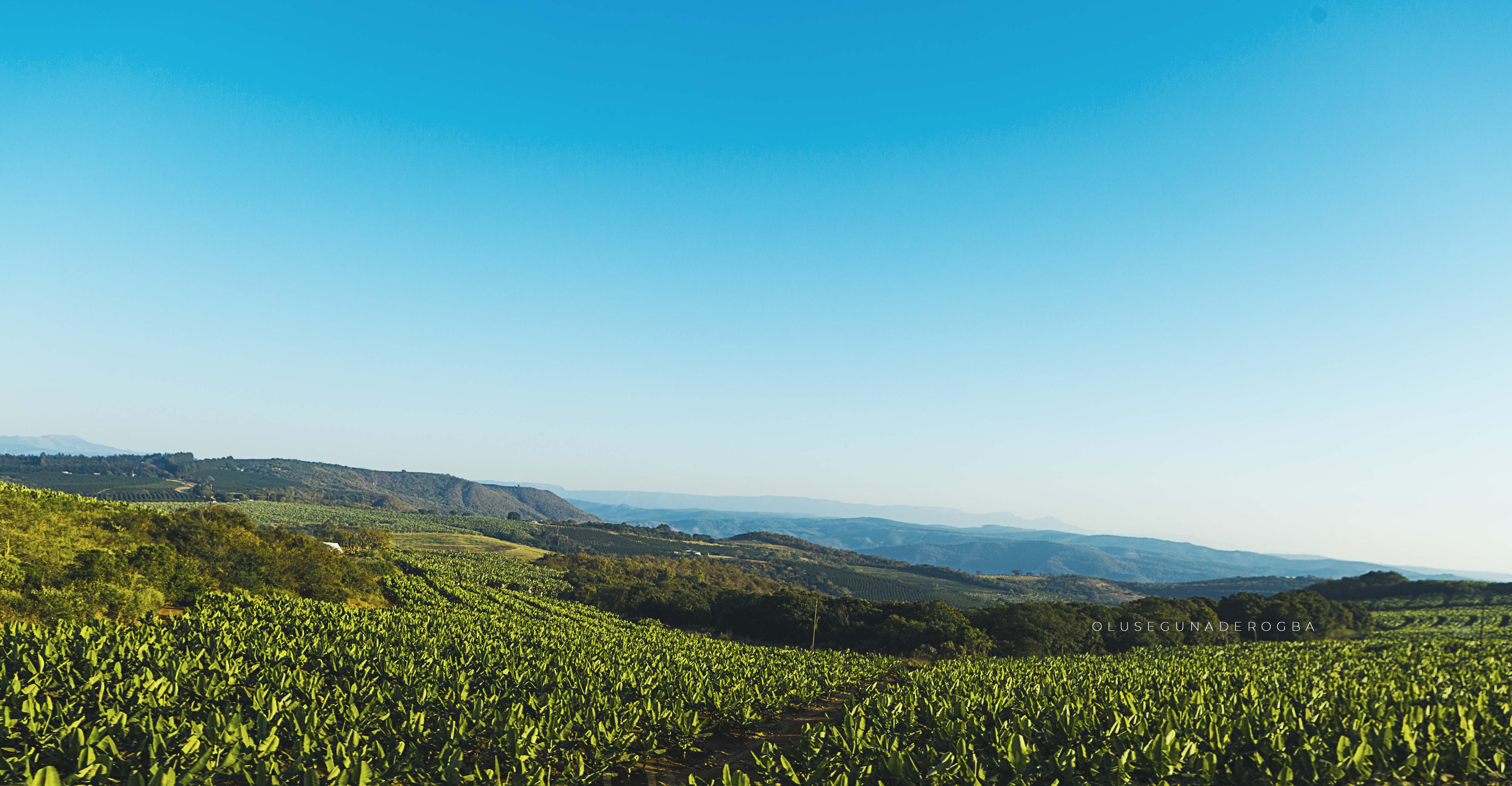
Banana farm near Hazyview
