= Thaba Chweu Local Municipality =

Thaba Chweu
- Local municipality
- Seal

- Location in Mpumalanga
- Coordinates: 25°5′S 30°35′E
- Country: South Africa
- Province: Mpumalanga
- District: Ehlanzeni
- Seat: Lydenburg
- Wards: 14

Government
  - Type: Municipal council
  - Mayor: Friddah Nkadimeng (ANC)

Area
  - Total: 5,719 km^{2} (2,208 sq mi)

Population (2011)
  - Total: 98,387
  - Density: 17.20/km^{2} (44.56/sq mi)

Racial makeup (2011)
  - Black African: 81.6%
  - Coloured: 2.6%
  - Indian/Asian: 0.6%
  - White: 14.5%

First languages (2011)
  - Northern Sotho: 36.2%
  - Swazi: 17.8%
  - Afrikaans: 15.2%
  - Zulu: 7.7%
  - Other: 23.1%
- Time zone: UTC+2 (SAST)
- Municipal code: MP321

Thaba Chweu Municipality (Northern Sotho: Mmasepala wa Thaba Chweu; Swazi: Masipaladi iThaba Chweu; Afrikaans: Thaba Chweu Munisipaliteit) is a local municipality within the Ehlanzeni District Municipality, in the Mpumalanga province of South Africa.

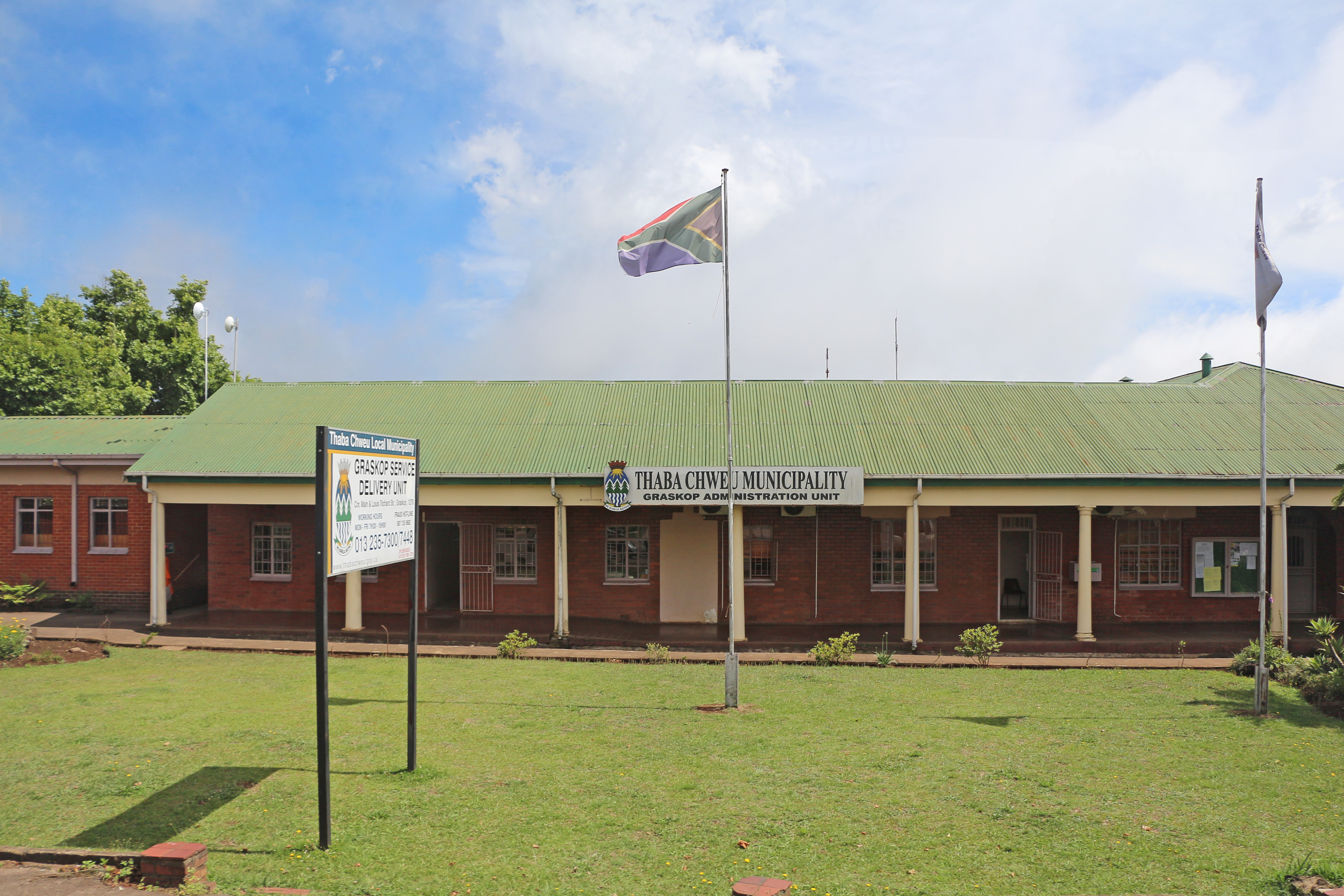
Thaba Chweu Municipality - Graskop Administration Unit

== Main places ==
The 2001 census divided the municipality into the following main places:

Place	Code	Area (km^{2})	Population	Most spoken language
Graskop	81401	1.57	2,326	Afrikaans
Lydenburg	81402	26.12	6,858	Afrikaans
Mashishing	81403	4.19	16,185	Northern Sotho
Pilgrim's Rest	81404	15.28	16,251	Northern Sotho
Sabie	81405	78.81	5,674	Afrikaans
Simile	81406	0.94	6,265	Swazi
Remainder of the municipality	81407	5,553.77	27,679	Northern Sotho

== Politics ==
The municipal council consists of twenty-seven members elected by mixed-member proportional representation. Fourteen are elected by first-past-the-post voting in fourteen wards, while the remaining thirteen are chosen from party lists so that the total number of party representatives is proportional to the number of votes received. In the election of 1 November 2021 the African National Congress (ANC) won a majority of sixteen seats on the council.

The following table shows the results of the election.

Party	Ward			List			Total seats
Party	Votes	%	Seats	Votes	%	Seats	Total seats
African National Congress	12,552	58.05	12	12,699	58.61	4	16
Democratic Alliance	4,744	21.94	2	4,730	21.83	4	6
Economic Freedom Fighters	2,435	11.26	0	2,570	11.86	3	3
Freedom Front Plus	773	3.57	0	793	3.66	1	1
African Unified Movement	300	1.39	0	282	1.30	1	1
Independent candidates	305	1.41	0				0
6 other parties	514	2.38	0	594	2.74	0	0
Total	21,623	100.00	14	21,668	100.00	13	27
Valid votes	21,623	98.47		21,668	98.38		
Invalid/blank votes	337	1.53		357	1.62		
Total votes	21,960	100.00		22,025	100.00		
Registered voters/turnout	50,959	43.09		50,959	43.22		
