= Graskop =

- Location within Mpumalanga Location within South Africa
- Coordinates: 24°55′54″S 30°50′30″E
- Country: South Africa
- Province: Mpumalanga
- District: Ehlanzeni
- Municipality: Thaba Chweu

Area
  - Total: 35.01 km^{2} (13.52 sq mi)
- Elevation: 1,436 m (4,711 ft)

Population (2011)
  - Total: 3,996
  - Density: 114.1/km^{2} (295.6/sq mi)

Racial makeup (2011)
  - Black African: 61.2%
  - Coloured: 13.0%
  - Indian/Asian: 0.9%
  - White: 22.9%
  - Other: 2.0%

First languages (2011)
  - Afrikaans: 29.4%
  - Northern Sotho: 22.0%
  - Sotho: 14.8%
  - English: 10.9%
  - Other: 22.8%
- Time zone: UTC+2 (SAST)
- Postal code (street): 1270
- PO box: 1270
- Area code: 013

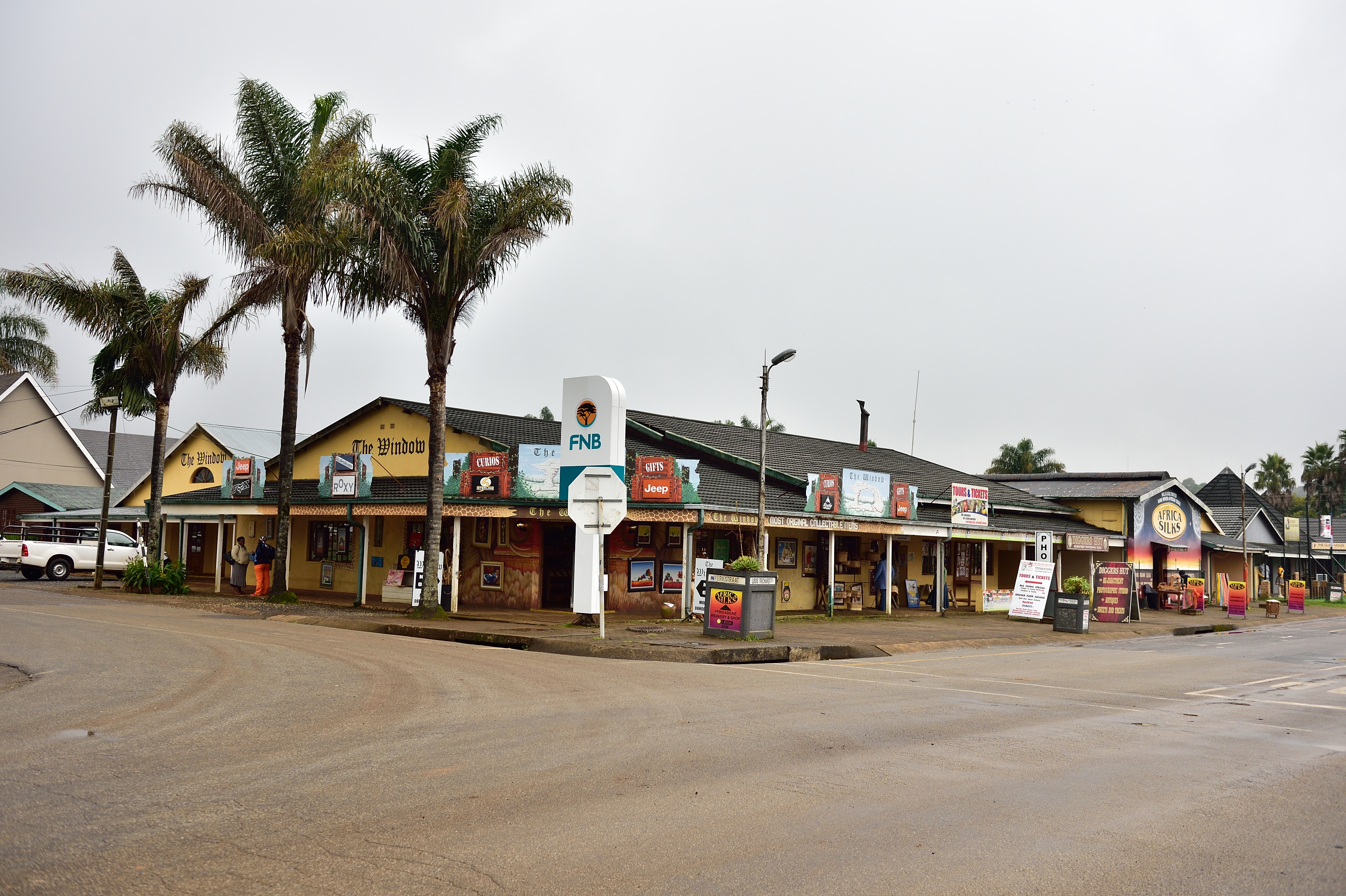
A street in Graskop

Graskop is a small town in Mpumalanga province, South Africa. It was established in the 1880s as a gold mining camp but it now serves as a tourist destination and the timber industry. “God’s Window”, a scenic view from the escarpment of the Lowveld below, is located outside the town. Graskop is 14 km south-east of Pilgrim's Rest and 28 km north of Sabie. The name is Afrikaans for grassy hillock. It is the best place to view the "Edge of the Lowveld", with a sudden drop of 700 metres.

== History ==
Rock paintings and other archaeological sites in the Graskop area indicate that people have lived in the area for thousands of years. Evidence from an archaeological site 40 km from the town has been dated to show hunter gather occupation 27,000 years ago.

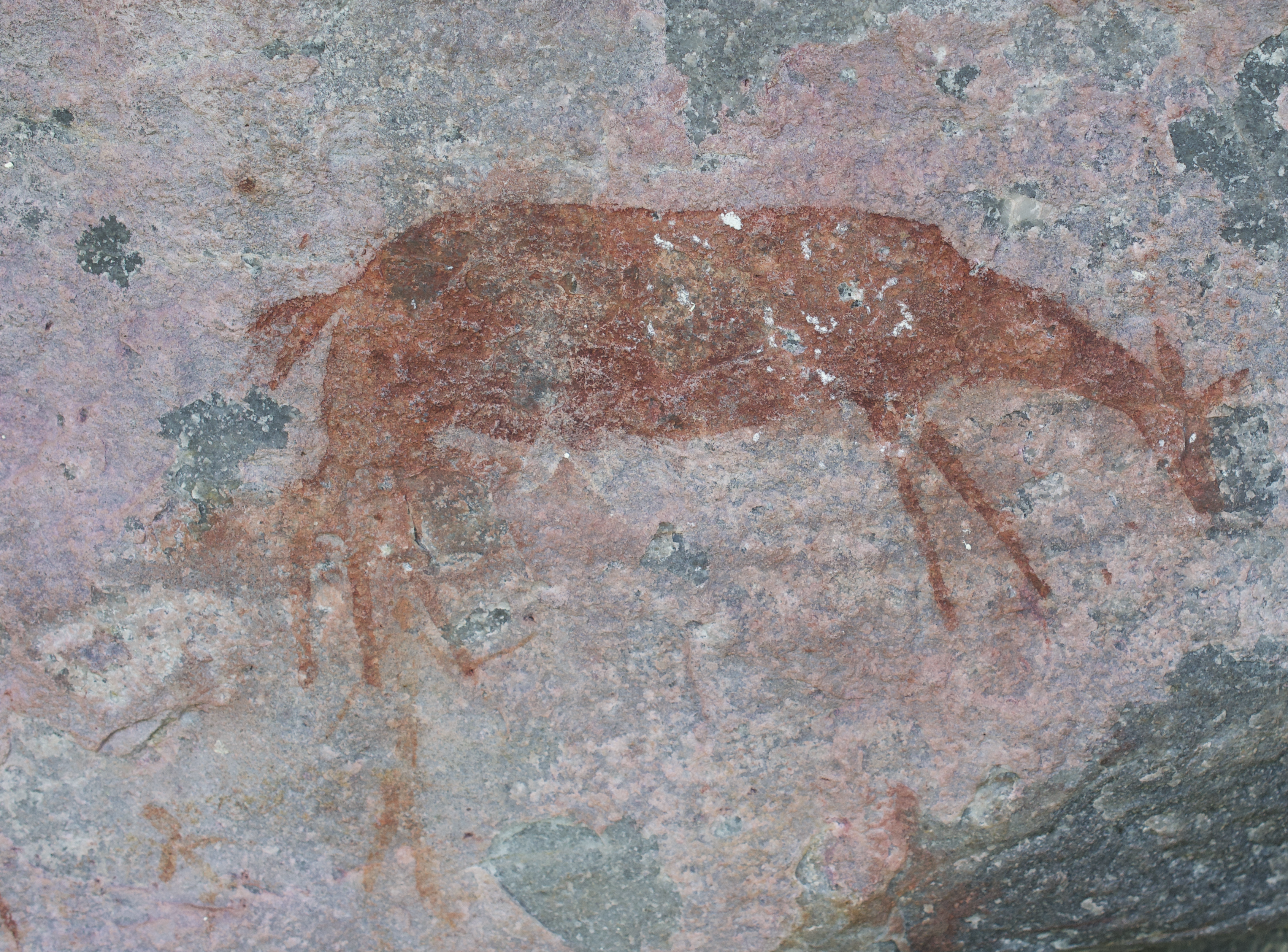
Rock painting near Graskop

Early ethnographical studies indicate that the wider Graskop area was inhabited by Eastern Sotho groups (Pulana, Kutswe and Pai), and the Tsonga people since before the 19th century. In the 1800s, when Swazi chiefdoms expanded north into the lowveld, groups of Pai people fled to caves in the Graskop area. Historically, diverse groups of people traveled between the highveld and the lowveld using footpaths along the route that became Kowyn's Pass, which connects Graskop to Bushbuckridge. The pass is named after Pulana chief, Kobêng, who had a homestead halfway down the pass.

In the 1870s, Abel Erasmus, Native Commissioner of the Transvaal Republic, owned the farm of Graskop. Following the discovery of gold at Mac Mac, the farm was bought by the Government of the Republic of Transvaal and settlers set up a mining camp at Graskop. Pilgrims Rest however remained a more popular and worthwhile mining site and there was not extensive prospecting and mining at Graskop in the 19th century. Percy Fitzpatrick established a camp in Graskop in the 1880s at Paradise Camp.

One kilometer outside the town is a natural bridge, formed of dolomite that crosses the Mac Mac River. In the colonial era, voortrekkers and settlers used the bridge to cross the river with their wagons.

The first trading store in Graskop was established by Max Carl Gustav Liebnitz in 1902.

In the early 1910s, a railway line was built between the Graskop area and Nelspruit to transport supplies to Pilgrim's Rest. Graskop was declared a town on 12 September 1914.

== Government ==
Graskop is a town within the Taba Chewu Local Municipality, which is within the wider Ehlanzeni District Municipality. The municipality is led by the African National Congress.

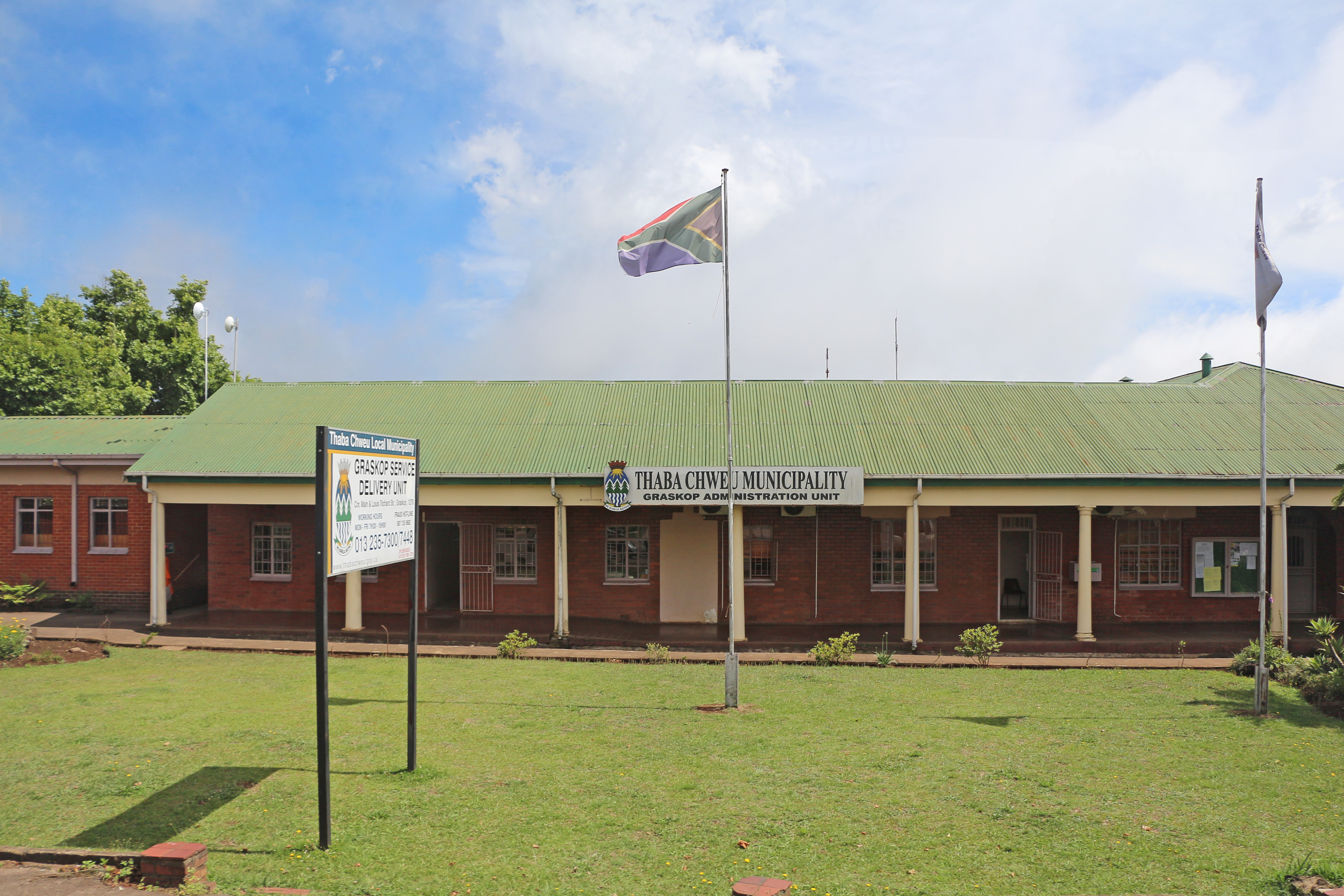
Thaba Chweu Local Municipality - Graskop Administration Unit

== Tourism ==
Graskop has become a popular tourism destination. It is located on the Panorama Route, which many tourists visit to view waterfalls and vistas of the Mpumalanga escaparment. The town is close to the Blyde River Canyon Nature Reserve, God's Window, Berlin Falls, the Pinnacle and Bourke's Luck Potholes.

== Gallery ==
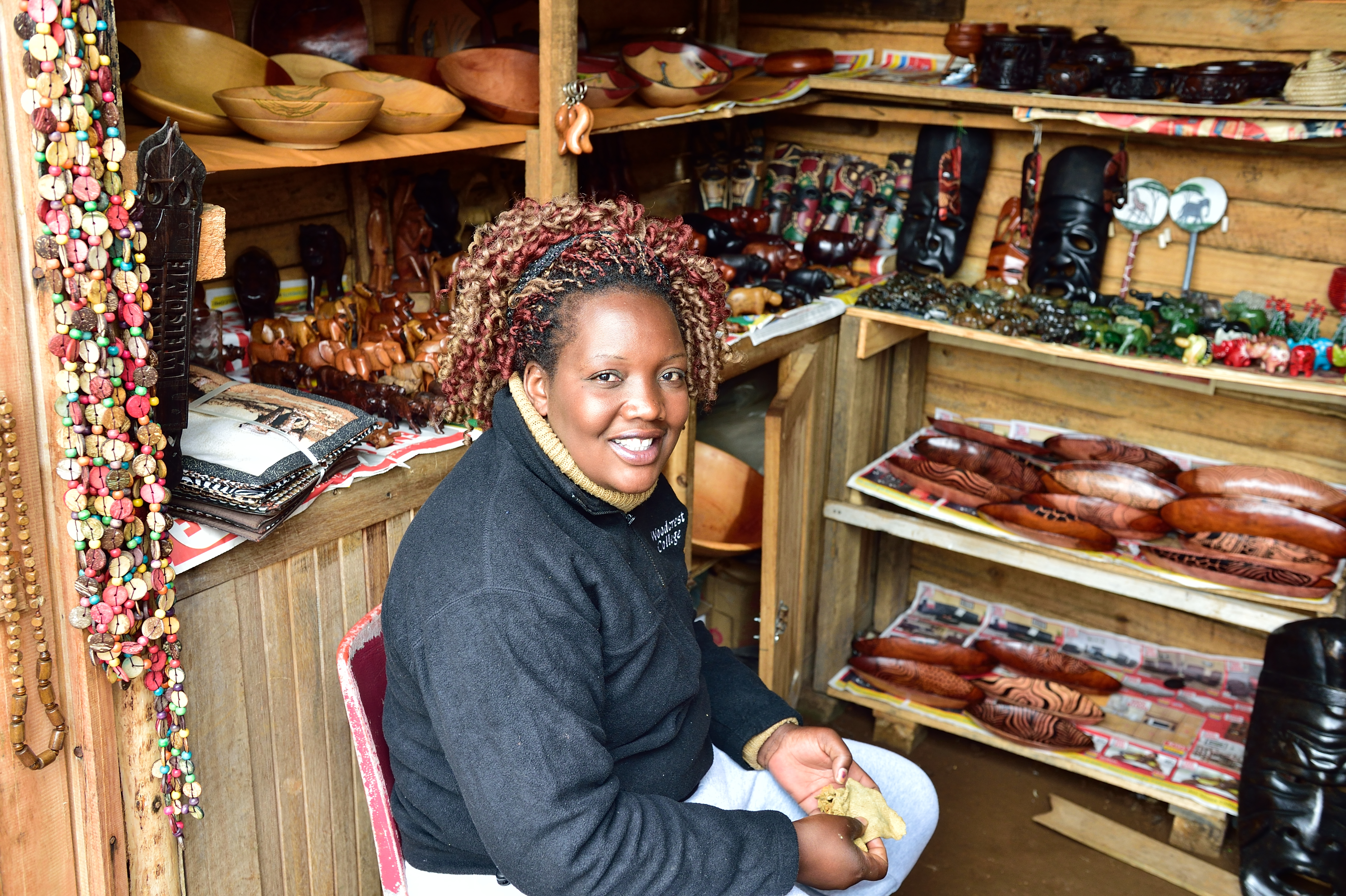
Crafts for sale in Graskop

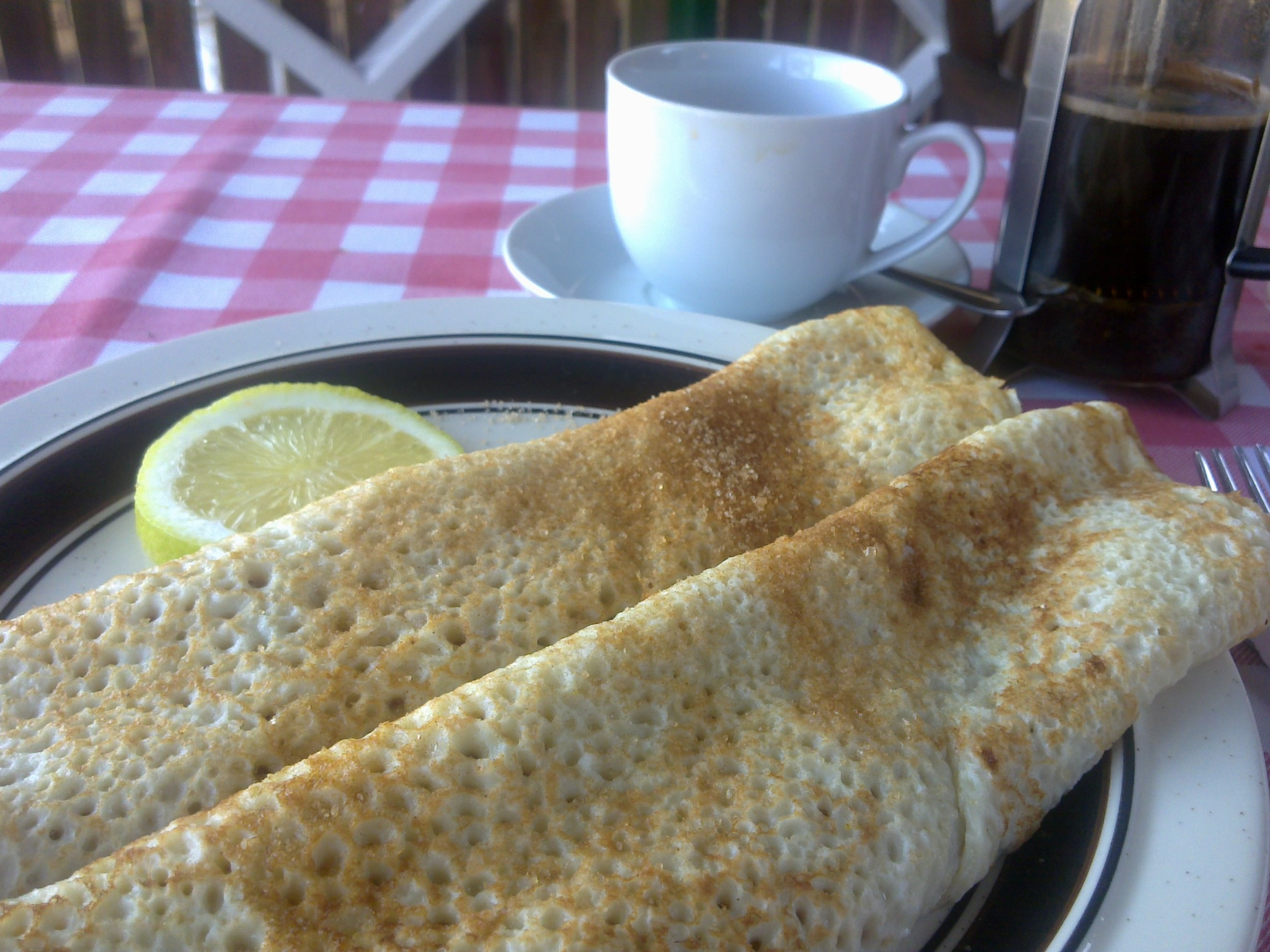
Graskop is known for its pancakes

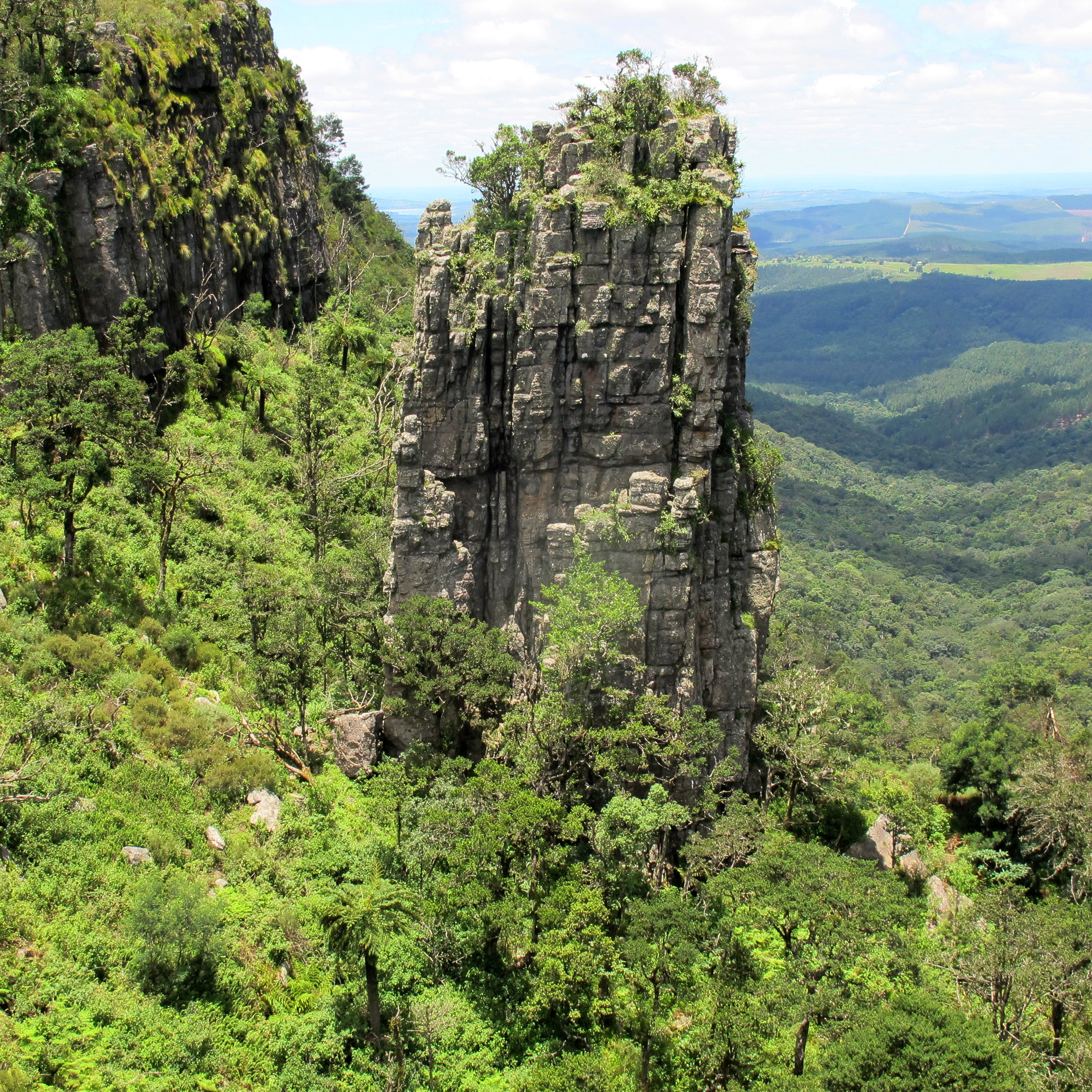
The Pinnacle, a landmark near Graskop

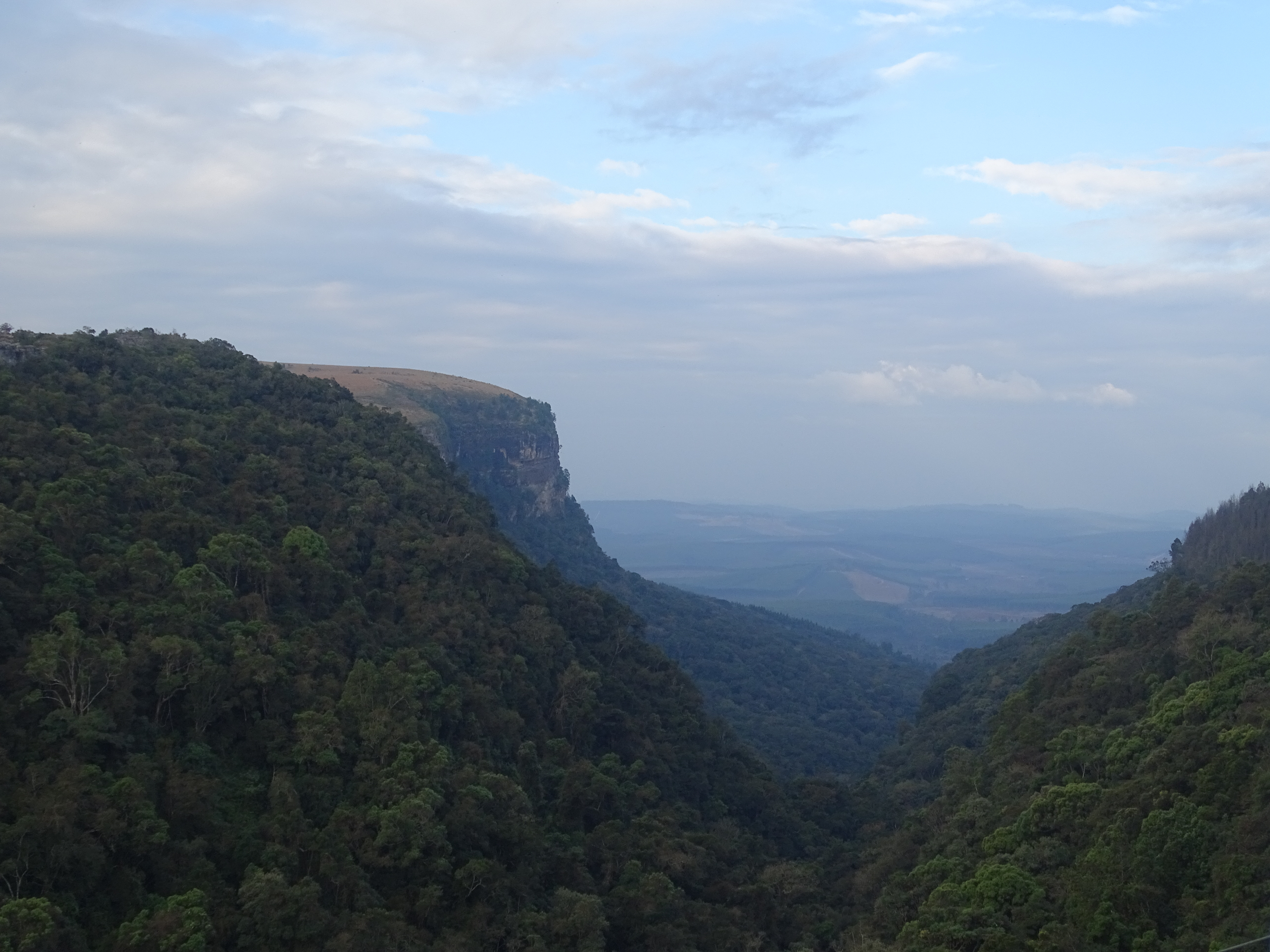
God's Window, a viewpoint near Graskop

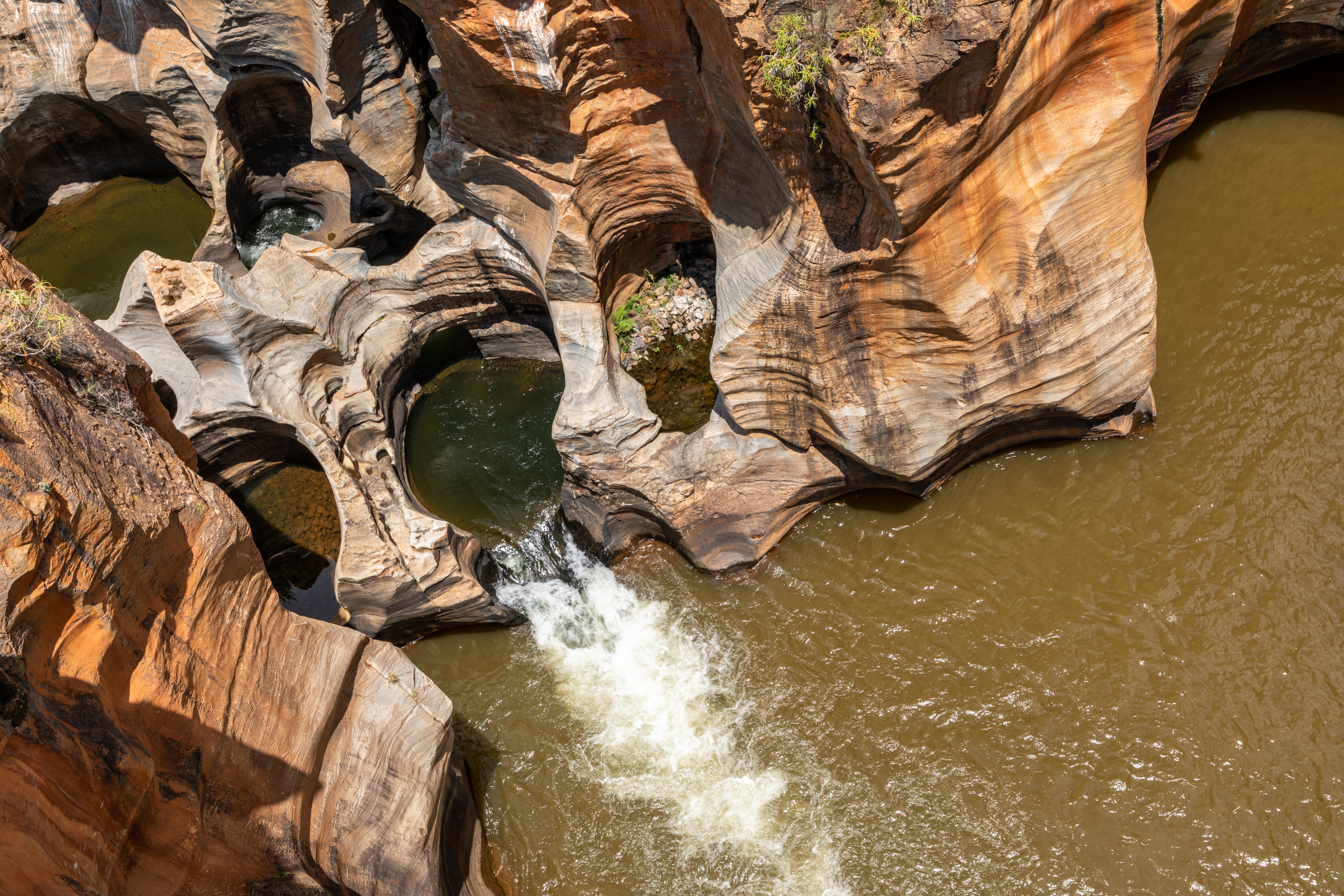
Bourkes Luck Potholes, near Graskop

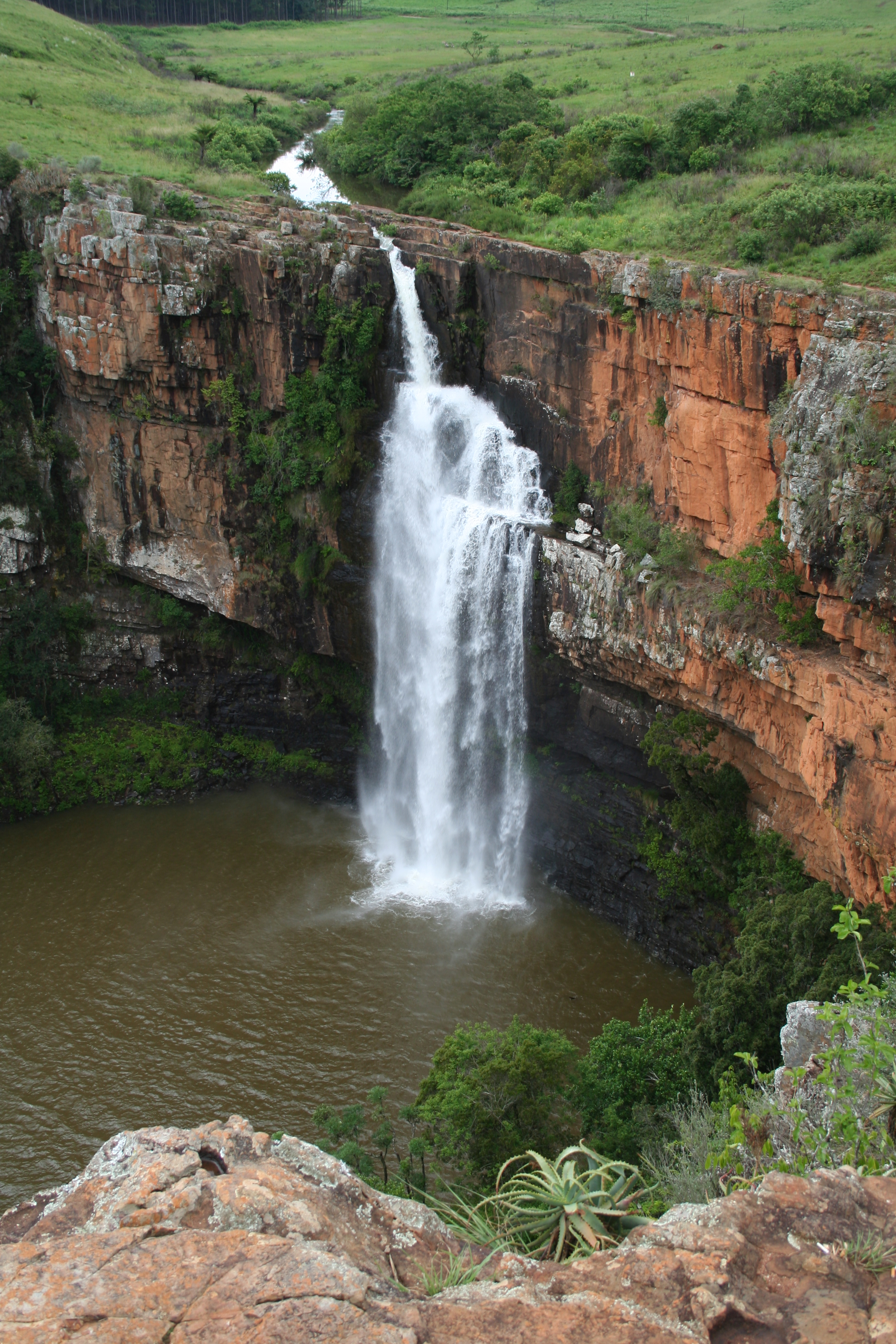
Berlin Falls, close to Graskop
