= Blyde River Canyon Nature Reserve =

Biosphere reserve in South Africa

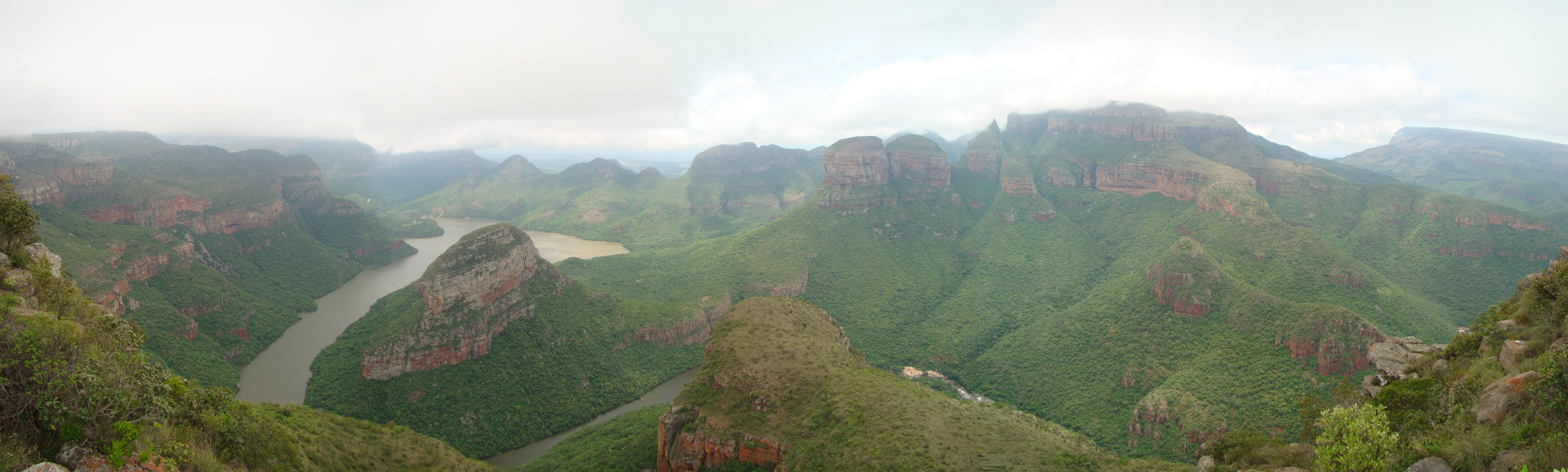
- The Three Rondavels promontory of the Drakensberg escarpment

- Location within Mpumalanga Location within South Africa
- Location: Northern Mpumalanga, South Africa
- Nearest city: Graskop
- Coordinates: 24°36′00″S 30°49′30″E
- Area: 29,000 ha (290 km^{2})
- Established: November 1965
- Governing body: Mpumalanga Tourism and Parks Agency (MTPA)
- Website: www.mtpa.co.za/index.php?parks+1811

Blyde River Canyon Nature Reserve (or Motlatse Canyon Provincial Nature Reserve) is situated in the Drakensberg escarpment region of eastern Mpumalanga, South Africa. The reserve protects the Blyde River Canyon, including sections of the Ohrigstad and Blyde Rivers and the geological formations around Bourke's Luck Potholes, where the Treur River tumbles into the Blyde below. Southwards of the canyon, the reserve follows the escarpment, to include the Devil's and God's Window, the latter a popular viewpoint to the lowveld at the reserve's southern extremity.

The Mogologolo (1,794 m), Mariepskop (1,944 m) and Hebronberg (1,767 m) massifs are partially included in the reserve. Elevation varies from 560 m to 1,944 m above sea level. Its resort areas are F.H. Odendaal and Swadeni, the latter only accessible from Limpopo province. The area of approximately 29,000 hectares (290 km^{2}) is administered by the Mpumalanga Parks Board.

== Bourke's Luck Potholes ==
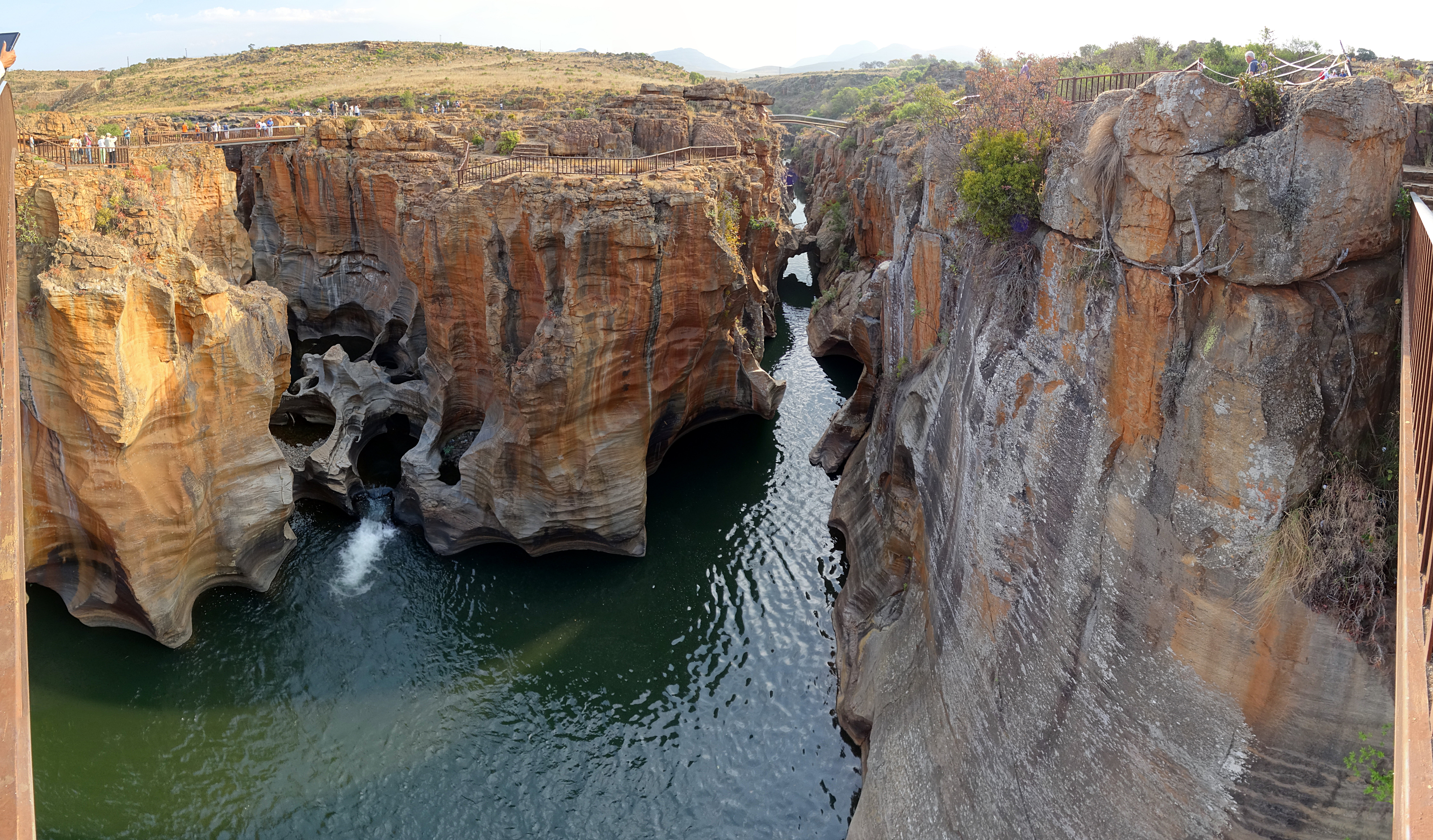
Potholes and plunge pools of the Treur River

This geological feature and day visitors' attraction, named after prospector Bernard Thomas Bourke (brother of Eddie Bourke), is situated at the confluence of the Treur and Blyde Rivers, on the reserve's western boundary 24°40′28″S 30°48′39″E. The reserve's nature conservation headquarters is located here, beside the village of Moremela, at the canyon's southern, or upper reaches. Bourke's Luck Potholes marks the beginning of the Blyde River Canyon.

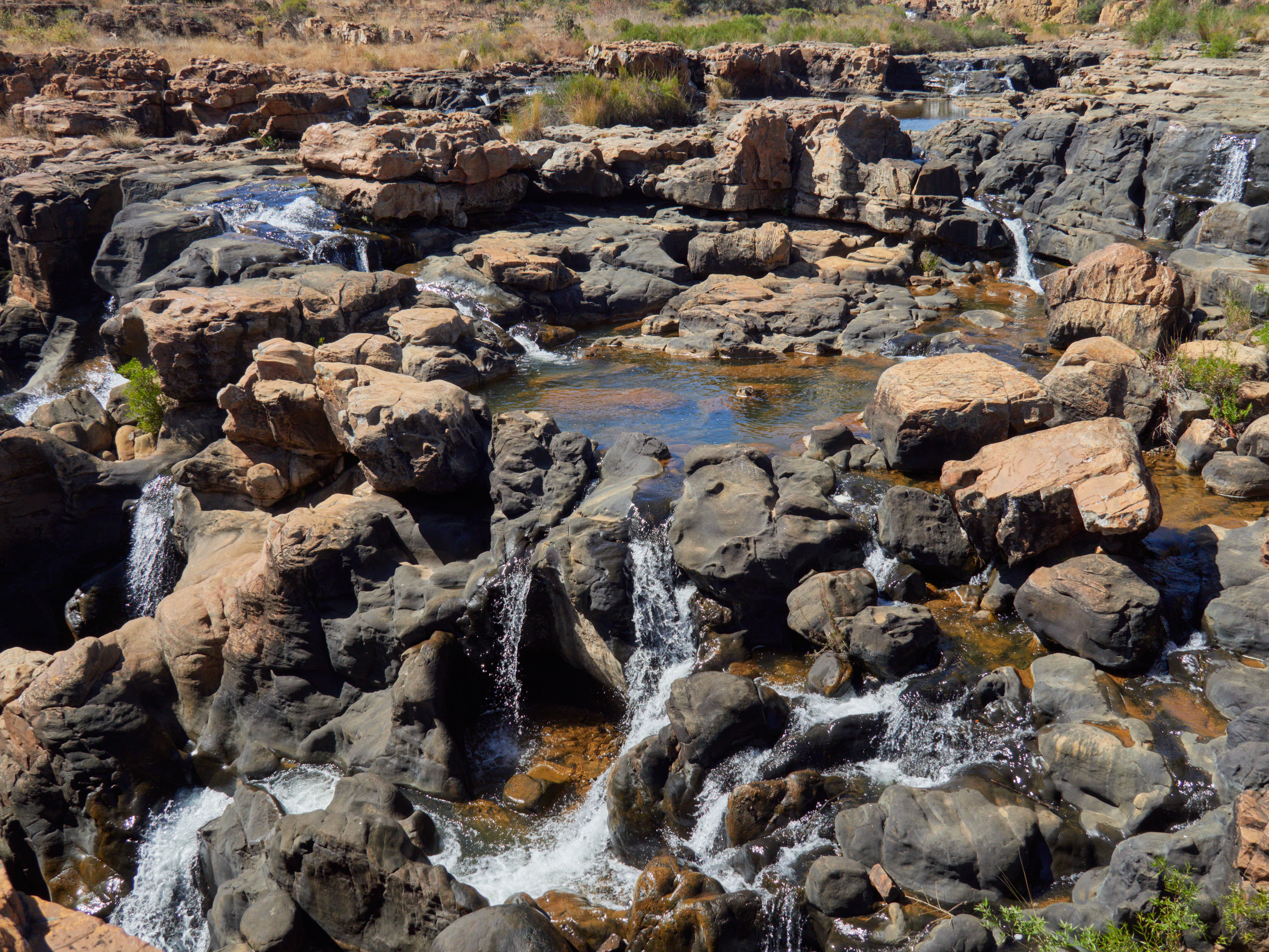
Bourke's Luck Potholes on the Blyde River.

Sustained kolks in the Treur River's plunge pools have eroded a number of cylindrical potholes or giant's kettles, which can be viewed from the crags above. The pedestrian bridges connect the various overlooks of the potholes and the gorge downstream.

== The Three Rondavels ==
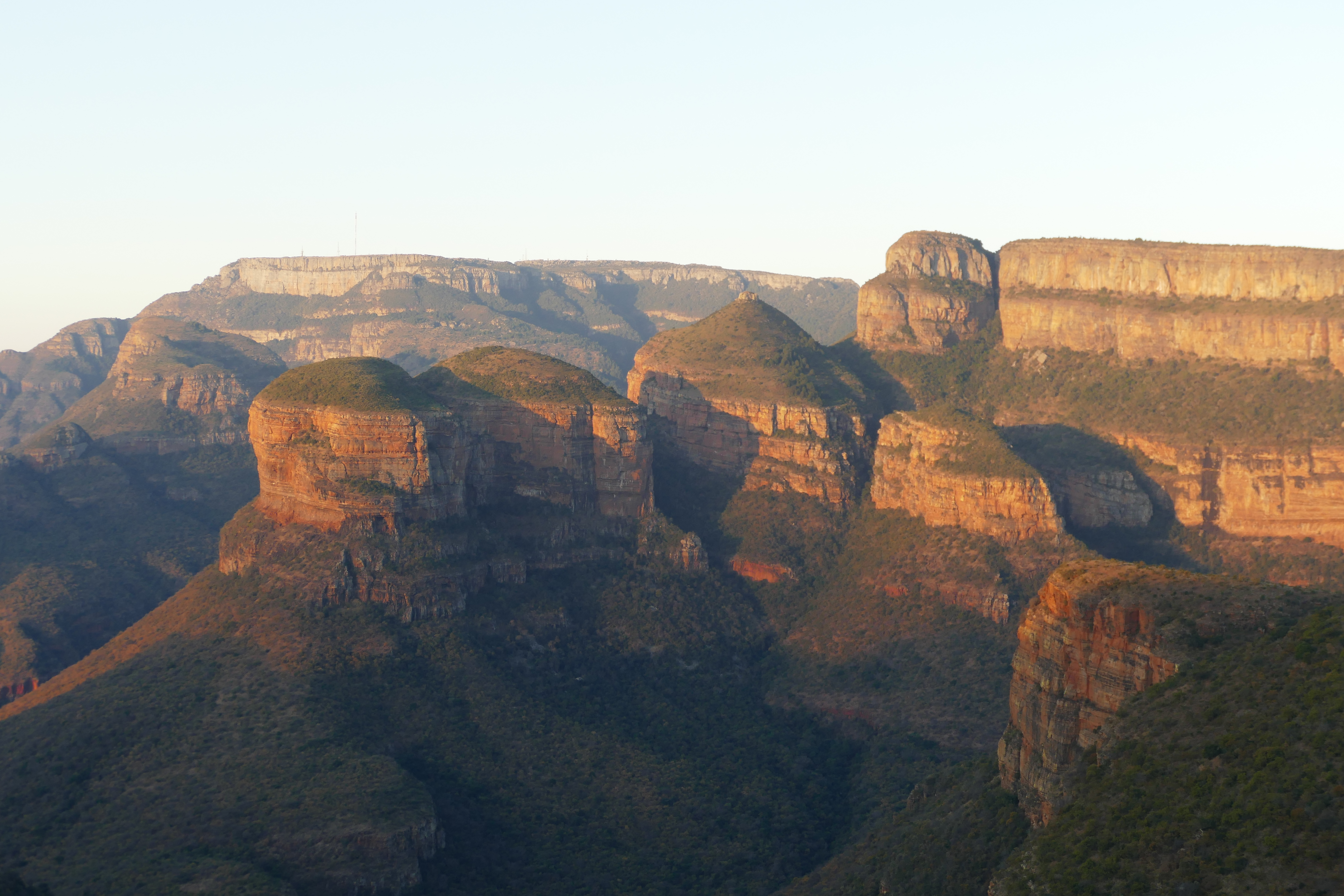
Three Rondavels

The Three Rondavels are three round, grass-covered mountain tops with somewhat pointed peaks. They quite closely resemble the traditional round or oval rondavels or African homesteads, which are made with local materials. Sometimes they are also called the Three Sisters, though this may confuse them with a similar threesome visible from the N1 road in the Northern Cape, very far to the south.

The names of the peaks commemorate a 19th-century chief, Maripi, and three of his wives. The flat-topped peak adjacent to the rondavels is Mapjaneng, "the chief", who is remembered for opposing invading Swazis in a memorable battle. The three rondavels are named for three of his more troublesome wives – Magabolle, Mogoladikwe and Maseroto. Behind the rondavels the distant high plateau of Mariepskop may be visible. Beside the dam, the isolated Thabaneng hill is known as the "sundial" or "mountain with a shadow that moves". It is said that the position of its shadow indicates the time of day.

On a clear day the lookout point provides extensive views. From here one looks over the canyon to the Three Rondavels on the other side, which is flanked on various sides by promontories of the northern Drakensberg range.

The formation of the attractive sedimentary formations are explained geologically as the slow erosion of underlying soft stone, leaving exposed the more resistant quartzite and shale that form the rondavels.

== God's Window ==
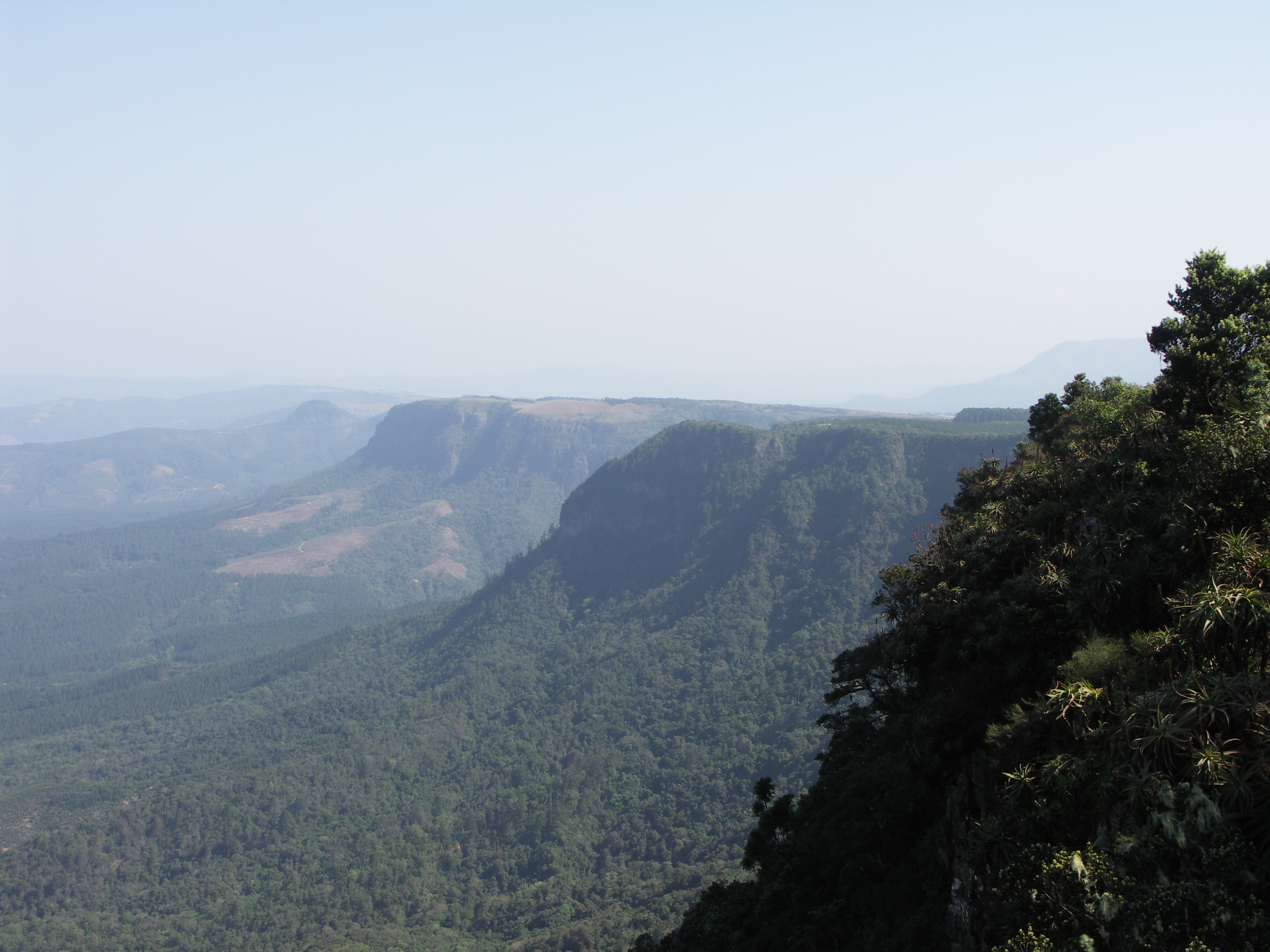
A southward view from God's Window towards Kowyn Pass

God's Window 24°52′28″S 30°53′29″E is a popular vantage point along the Drakensberg escarpment, at the southern extremity of the Nature Reserve.

Here, sheer cliffs plunge over 700 metres to the Lowveld. From this escarpment—a mostly unbroken rampart of cliffs—opens a vista into the Lowveld expanse and escarpment forests, the Eden-like aesthetic appearance of which prompted the name. On a clear day it is possible to see over the Kruger National Park towards the Lebombo Mountains on the border with Mozambique. Although relatively uncommon, with extremely good visibility, the Indian Ocean is also partly visible.

God's Window features prominently in the plot of the 1980 cult film The Gods Must Be Crazy. Near the end of the movie, the Bushman character Xi (played by Namibian bush farmer N!xau) travels to God's Window, and due to some low-lying cloud cover believes it to be the end of the Earth.

The original Window is a rock that is set further back on a private farm and due to quarry operations and tree plantation farming, this actual rock that looks like a square window could not be used. The site was moved by the government to the edge of the escarpment.

A viewing platform 24°52′35.8″S 30°53′19.6″E near the car park gives extensive views down the gorge to the plain below.

== Fauna ==
The high plateaus are inhabited by mountain reedbuck, baboon troops and rock hyraxes. Impala, kudu, blue wildebeest, waterbuck and zebra roam the wooded lowveld area. Hippo and crocodile are present in the Blyderivierpoort Dam.

Three species of flat gecko were described in 2014 from the reserve and its vicinity. The Blyde River flat gecko, discovered in 1991, is as yet only known from the cliff face of one of the three rondavels, while the Mariepskop flat gecko was discovered on nearby Mariepskop in 1982. The Abel Erasmus flat gecko is known to occur at Bourke's Luck inside the reserve.

Exotic fish like smallmouth bass, brown and rainbow trout occur in the river, which have reduced the range of the local Treur river barb to upper catchments of the Blyde River system. Thanks to reintroductions after its rediscovery in the 1970s, it now flourishes here. The Natal mountain catfish occurs as an isolated population in the Limpopo system, and the Belvedere creek is the only place in the Limpopo system where the Rosefin barb is found.

African fish eagle and African finfoot are found along the Blyde River. The lowveld woodlands harbour purple-crested lourie, emerald cuckoo, red-backed mannikin, golden-tailed woodpecker, gorgeous bushshrike, white-faced owl and a number of raptors like white-backed vulture, gymnogene, black-chested snake eagle, Wahlberg's eagle and long-crested eagle. A number of raptors frequent the mountains and cliffs, including cape vulture, black eagle, jackal buzzard, peregrine falcon, lanner falcon and rock kestrel.

Birds associated with flowering plants of the higher slopes include Gurney's sugarbird and malachite sunbird. A breeding colony of bald ibis occurs in the grassy uplands, besides small numbers of cape eagle-owl and red-breasted sparrowhawk. Forest birds include crowned eagle, Knysna lourie, cinnamon dove, olive bushshrike, green twinspot and wood owl.

== Flora ==
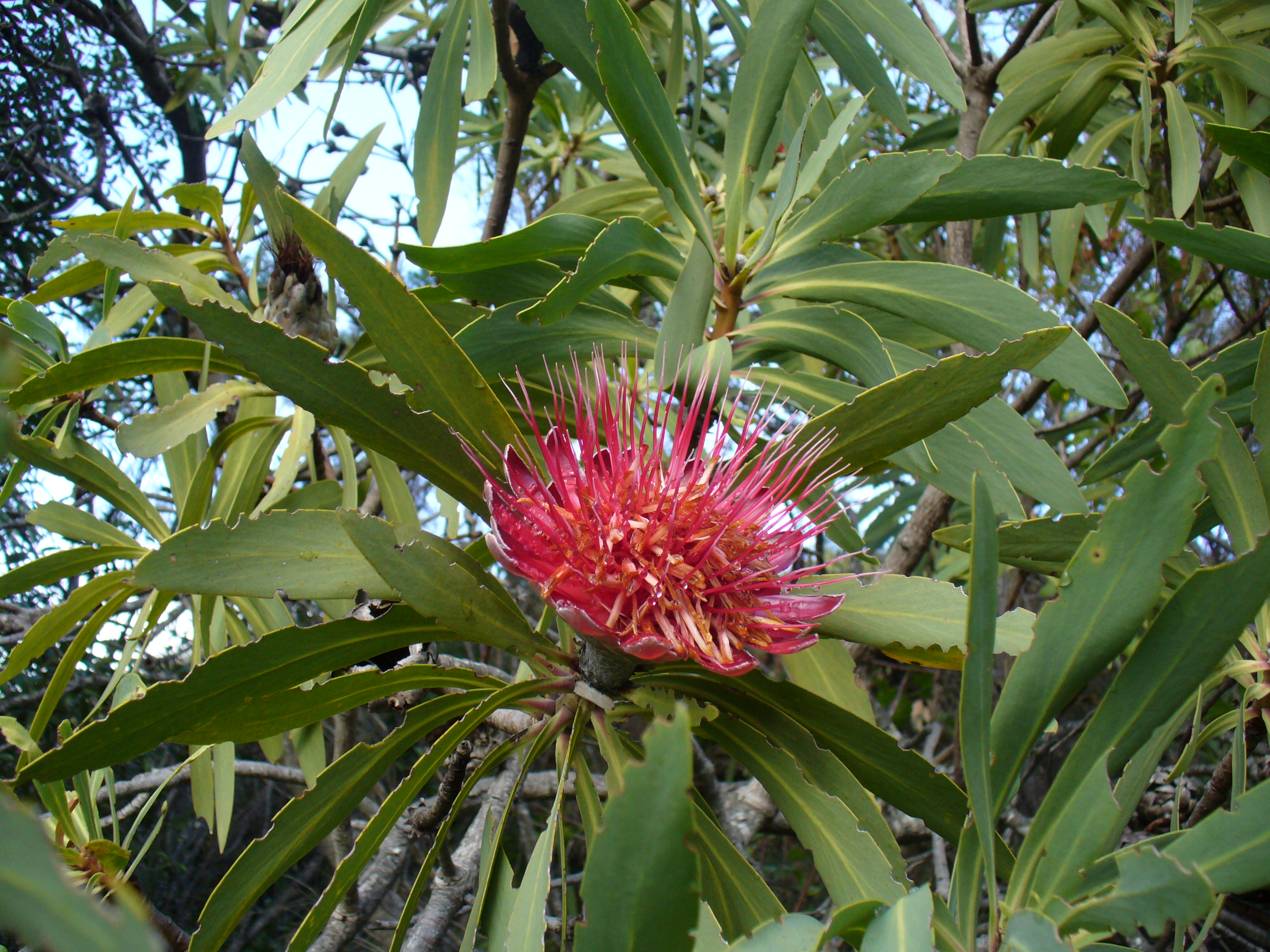
Ten species of the Proteaceae occur within the reserve's confines, among which the Blyde river protea which is endemic to the canyon.

The reserve's vegetation is classified as the Northeastern Drakensberg High-Mountain Sourveld ecoregion, an area prone to lightning-induced burning. Its very diverse flora is ascribed to the variation in altitude and rainfall (541 mm to 2,776 mm p.a.), and the extremes in geology and pedology. It is topographically complex with a variety of habitats which include grassland plateaus, wetlands and sponge areas, grassland slopes, afromontane forest, riparian forest, moist woodlands, dry woodlands and shrublands. Its four veld types are Afromontane Forest, North-eastern Mountain Sour Grassland, Sour Lowveld Bushveld and Mixed Lowveld Bushveld.

Around a 1,000 plant species have been recorded. This includes cycads, of which the Blyde river cycad is almost endemic to the reserve, with some 200 individuals remaining. A variety of orchid, lily and protea (genera Protea, Faurea and Leucospermum) species occur, including the Blyde river protea which is endemic to the canyon, and the escarpment pincushion of which about 30 plants are present. Tree ferns grow along seepages in the uplands.

Indigenous forest covers 2,111 ha of the nature reserve, or 7.3% of its surface area. These are fragmented into some 60 patches between 0.21 ha and 567 ha in extent. They are assigned to two forest communities, high altitude moist and low altitude dry afromontane forest. The altitudinal gradient accounts for most of their variation in plant communities.

== General area ==
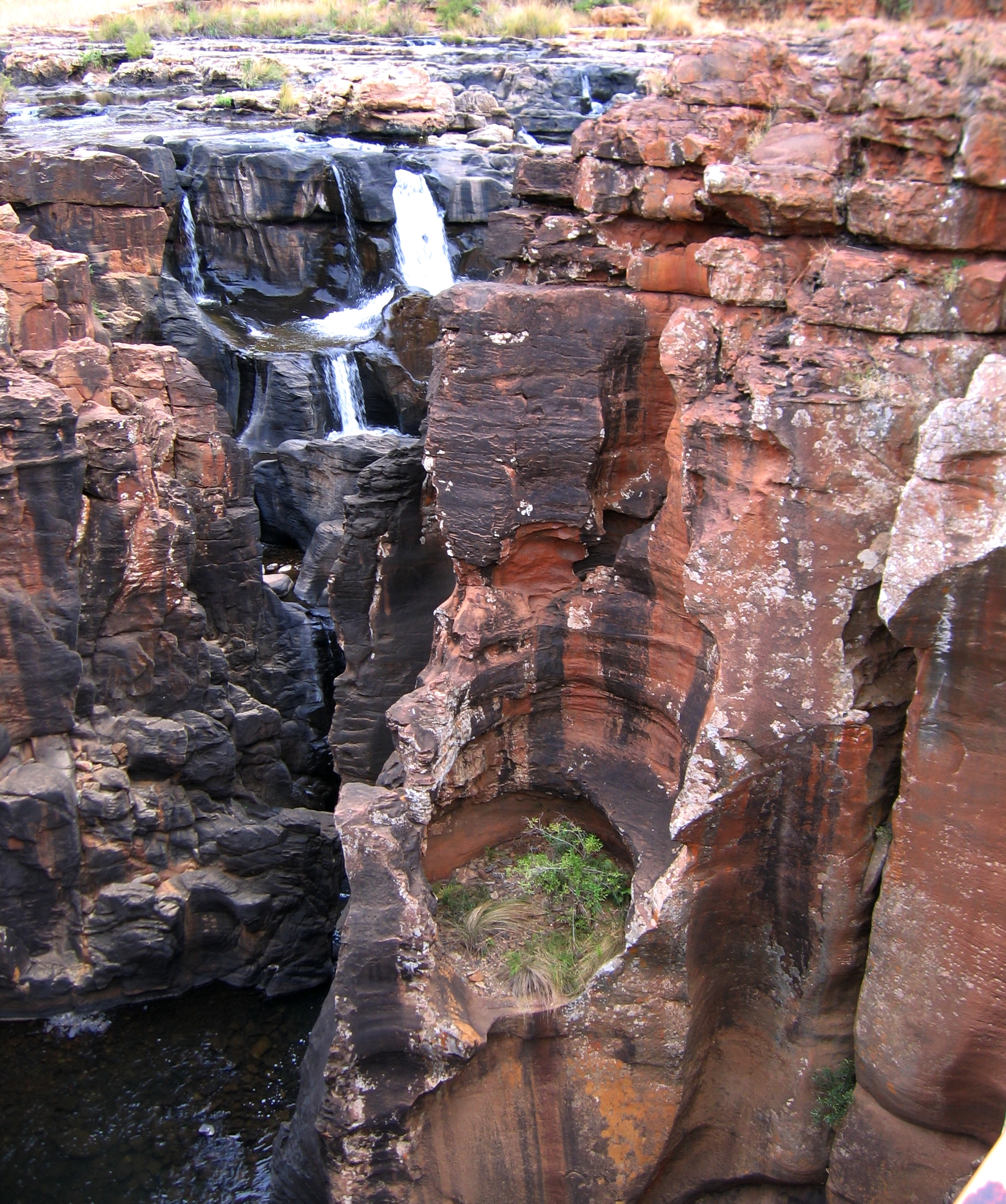
Klaserie Waterfall Nature Reserves referenced by the S.A.H.R.A

The reserve is fringed to the east by the Mariepskop and Klaserie Waterfall Nature Reserves, and the Mapulaneng forestry region, below the escarpment. National Park status had been considered, if some adjacent areas were to be incorporated and their forestry activities discontinued.

Percy FitzPatrick and George Fullerton's summer quarters as transport riders during the 1880s was situated at Paradise Camp 24°55′24″S 30°52′08″E, some 6 km south of God's Window, and similarly perched on the edge of the escarpment. Close to God's Window are several waterfalls, including Berlin Falls and Lisbon Falls.
