= Blyde River Canyon =

Large canyon in South Africa

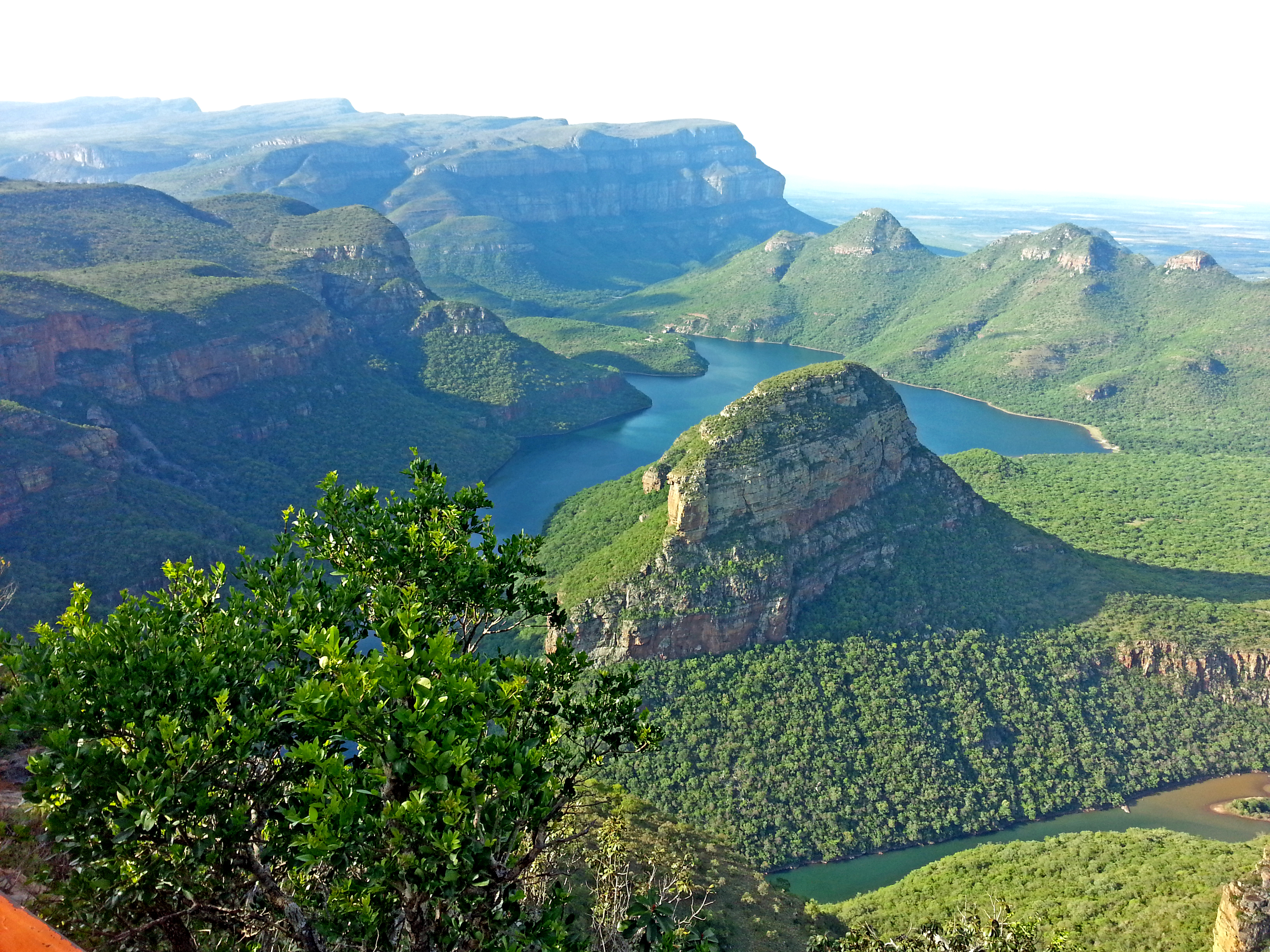

- Location within South Africa
- Length: 26 km (16 mi)

Geography
- Location: Mpumalanga, South Africa
- Coordinates: 24.59°S 30.80°E
- Rivers: Blyde River
- Interactive map of Blyde River Canyon

The Blyde River Canyon is a 26 km long canyon located in Mpumalanga, South Africa. It is the third-largest canyon on Earth, behind the Grand Canyon and the Fish River Canyon. Unlike the Grand and Fish River Canyon, the Blyde River Canyon is a "green canyon" which is dominated by subtropical vegetation. The canyon forms part of the Blyde River Canyon Nature Reserve.

The Blyde River Canyon passes a rock formation known as the "Three Rondavels". So named as the formation resembles three African-style houses or rondavels. This canyon is part of the Panorama Route. This route starts at the town Graskop and includes God's Window, the Pinnacle and Bourke's Luck Potholes.

== Name ==
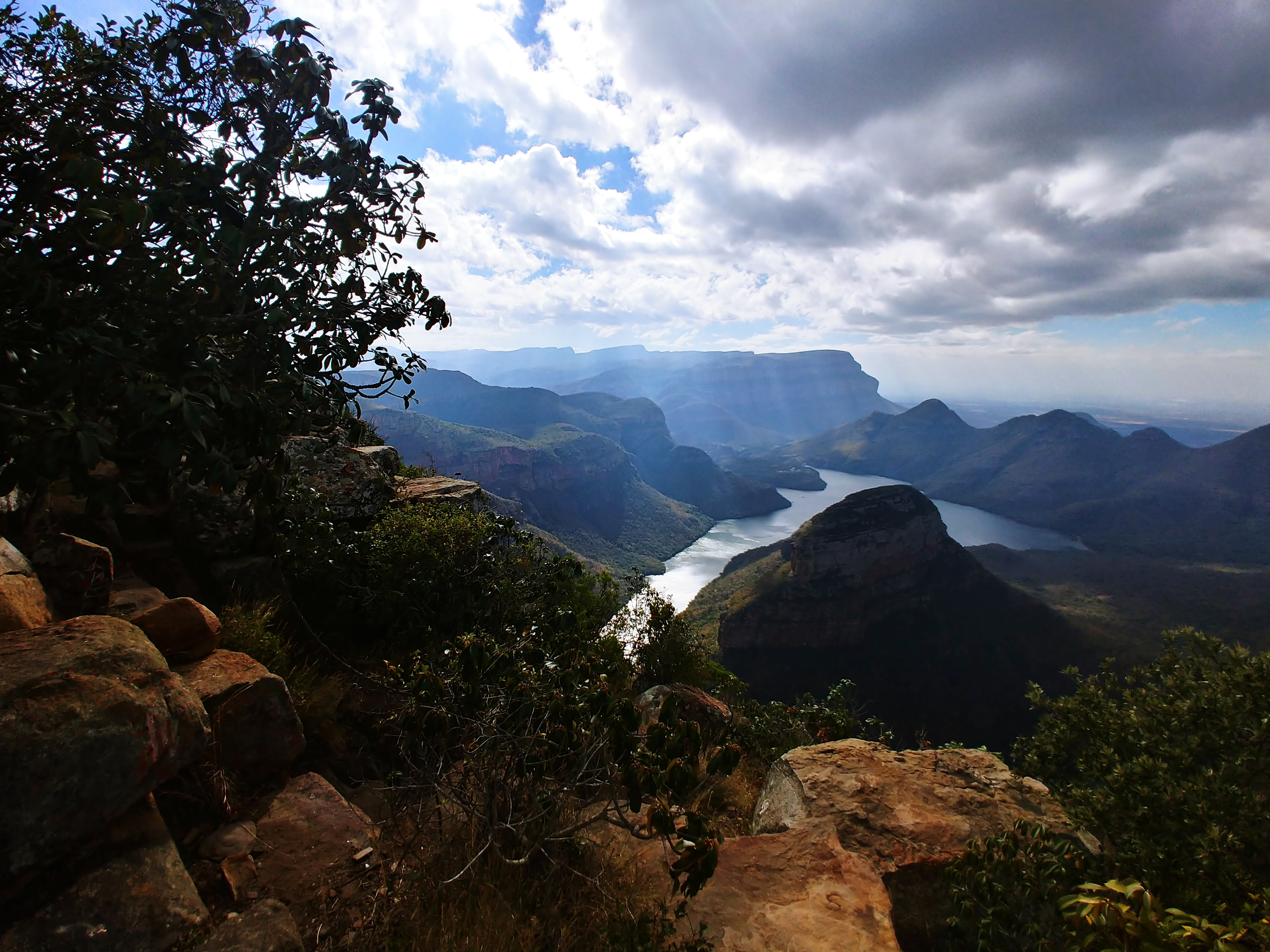
The Blyde River Canyon

The canyon is named for the river that runs through it, the Blyde River, now called the Motlatse River. Blyde means "glad" or "happy" in old Dutch, a name derived from a voortrekkers' expedition. The 'happy river' was thus named in 1844, when Hendrik Potgieter and others returned safely from Delagoa Bay to the rest of their party of trekkers who had considered them dead. While still under this misapprehension they had named the nearby river where they had been encamped, Treurrivier, or 'mourning river'.

In 2005, the Blyde River was renamed to the Motlatse River, and the Mpumalanga Provincial Government announced that the canyon would be renamed as well.

== Fauna and flora ==
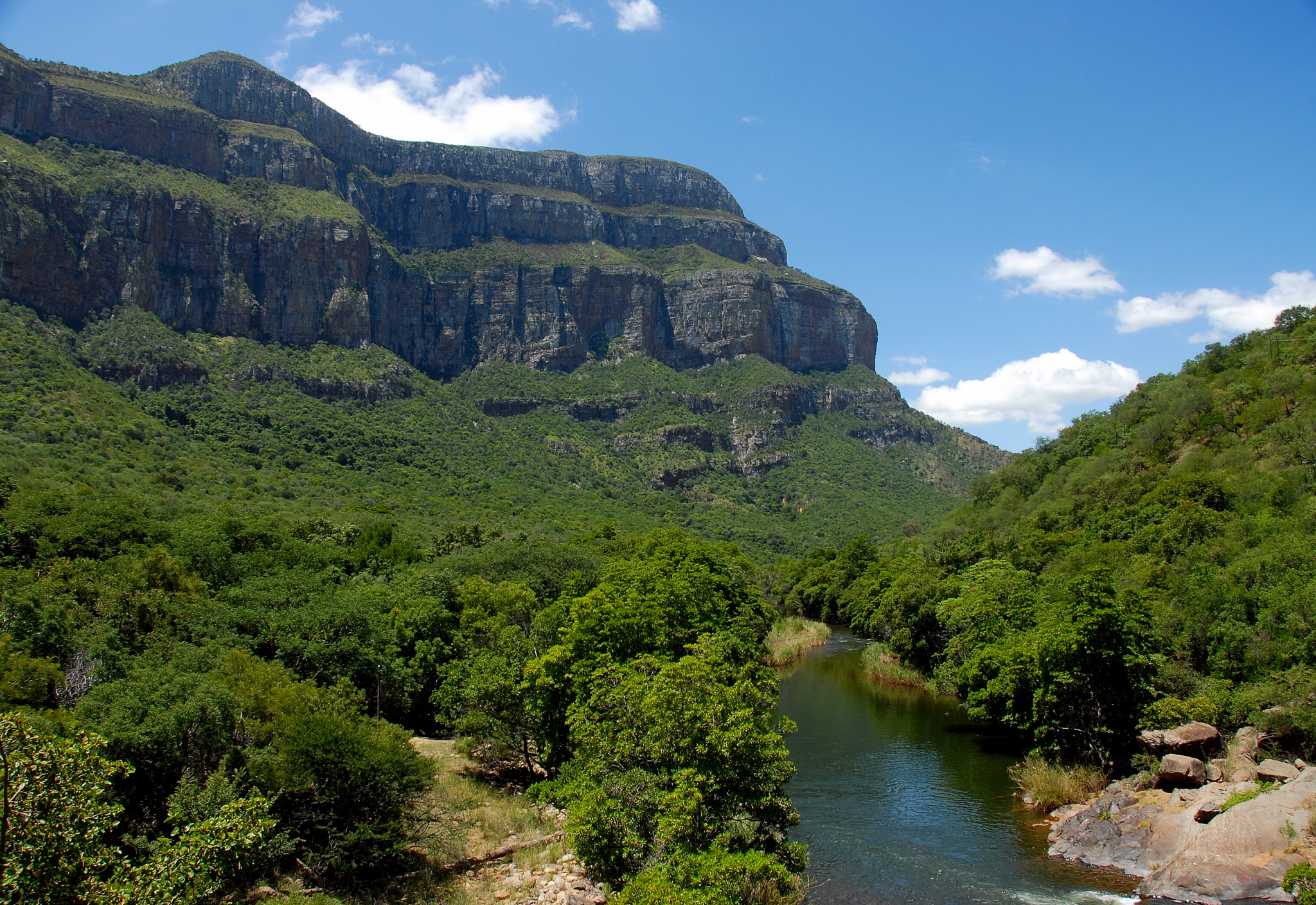
The Blyde as it exits the canyon near Swadeni

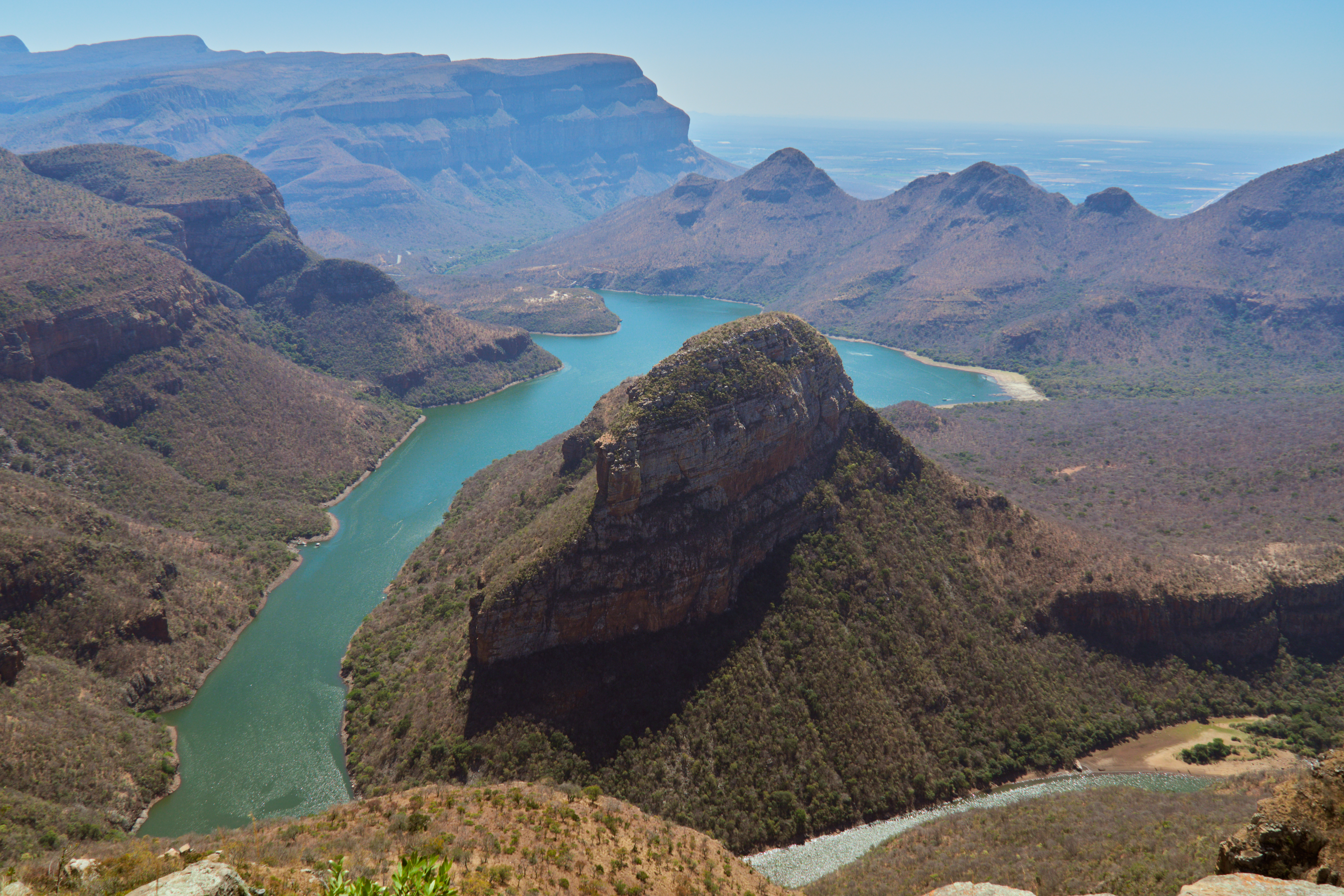
The Blyde River Canyon with the Blyde River Dam reservoir winding around an isolated rock formation known as The Pinnacle, viewed from above on the Panorama Route.

The Blyde River Canyon supports large diversity of life, including numerous fish and antelope species as well as hippos and crocodiles, and every primate species that may be seen in South Africa (including both greater and lesser bushbabies, vervet monkeys and Samango monkeys). The diversity of birdlife is similarly high, including the beautiful and much sought Narina trogon as well as species such as the Cape vulture, black eagle, crowned eagle, African fish eagle, gymnogene, jackal buzzard, white-rumped vulture, bald ibis, African finfoot, Knysna lourie, purple-crested lourie, Gurney's sugarbird, malachite sunbird, cinnamon dove, African emerald cuckoo, red-backed mannikin, golden-tailed woodpecker, olive bush shrike, green twinspot, Taita falcons (very rarely sighted, a breeding pair lives in the nearby Abel Erasmus Pass), Cape eagle owl, white-faced owl, wood owl, peregrine falcon, black-breasted snake eagle, Wahlberg's eagle, long-crested eagle, lanner falcon, red-breasted sparrowhawk, rock kestrel and others.

== Kadishi waterfall ==
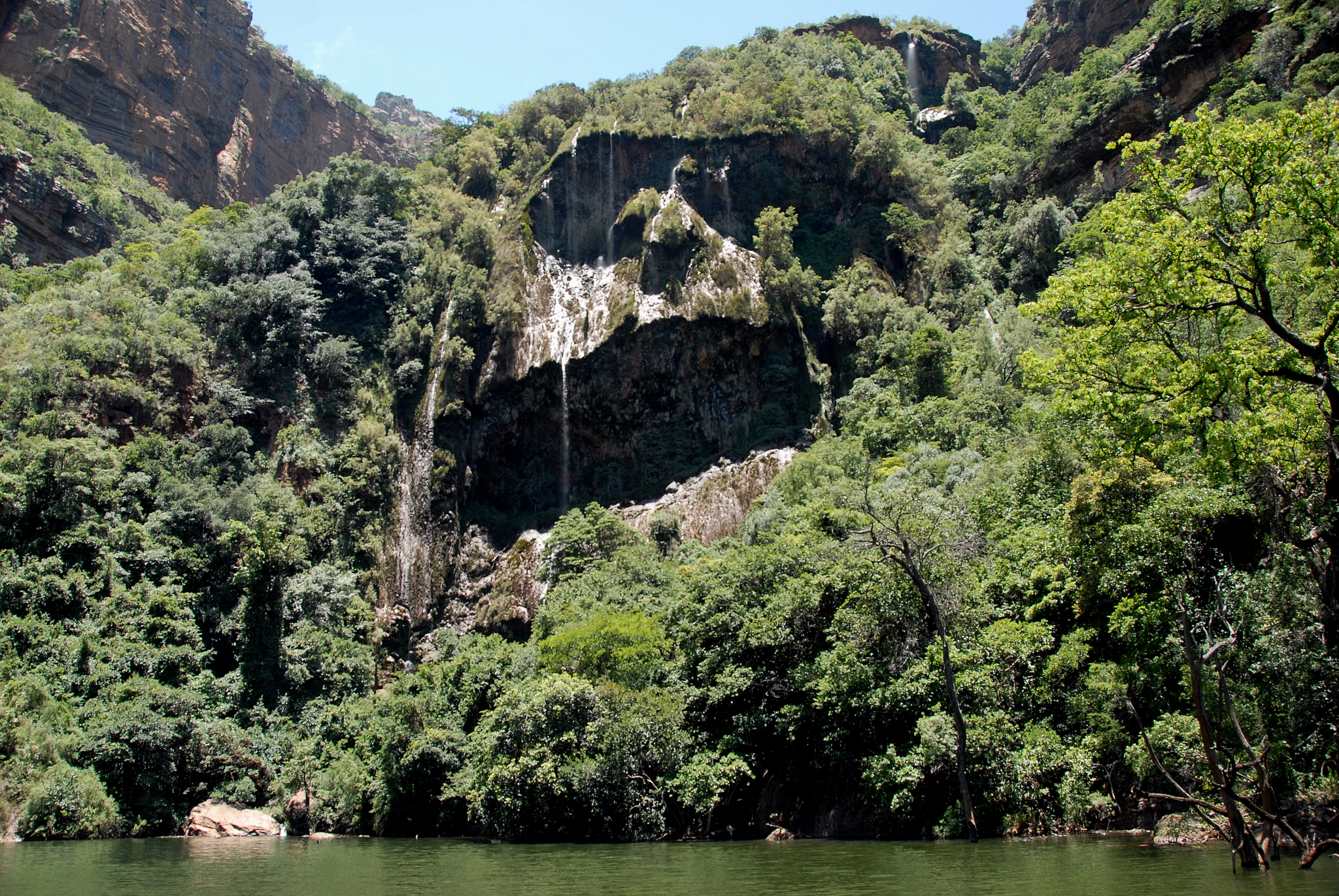
The weeping face of nature

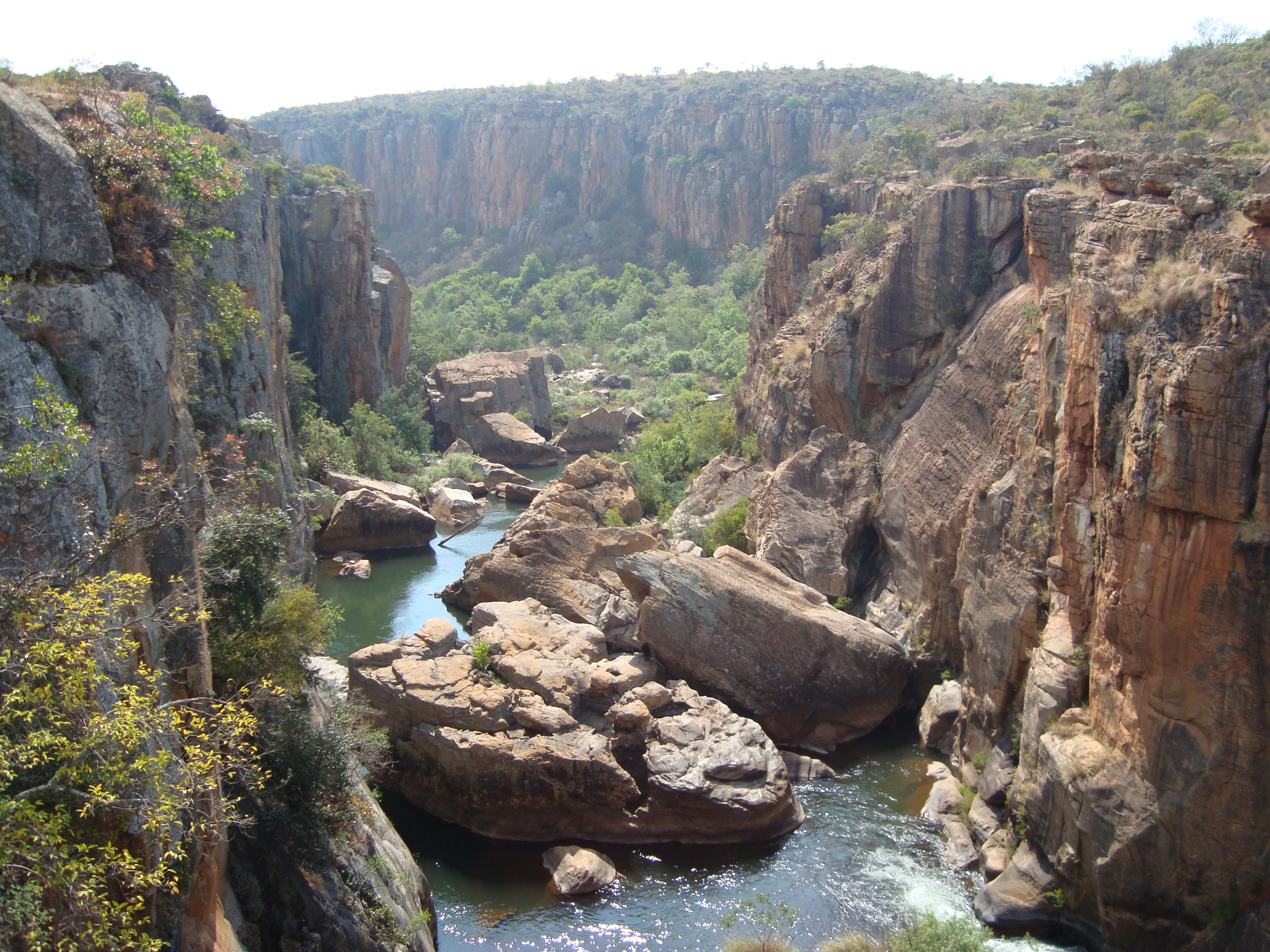
The upper canyon as seen from Bourke's Luck at the Treur-Blyde confluence

At 200 metres (660 ft), the Kadishi Tufa waterfall is the second tallest tufa waterfall on Earth. A tufa waterfall is formed when water running over dolomite rock absorbs calcium, and deposits rock formations more rapidly than they erode the surrounding rock. In the case of the Kadishi Tufa fall, the formation that has been produced strikingly resembles a face which is crying profusely, and is thus sometimes known as 'the weeping face of nature'.

== Tourism ==
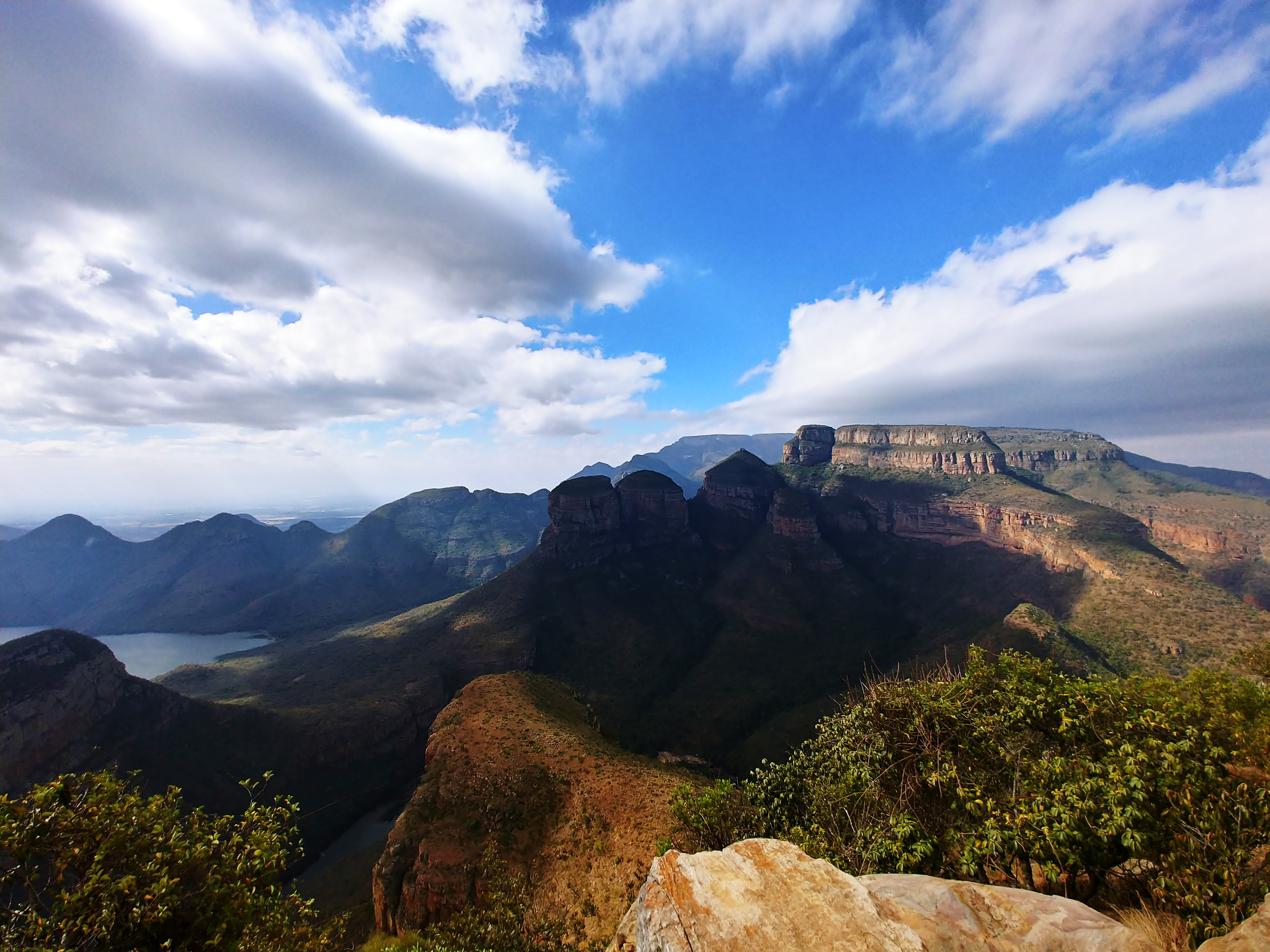
The Three Rondavels in the Blyde River Canyon

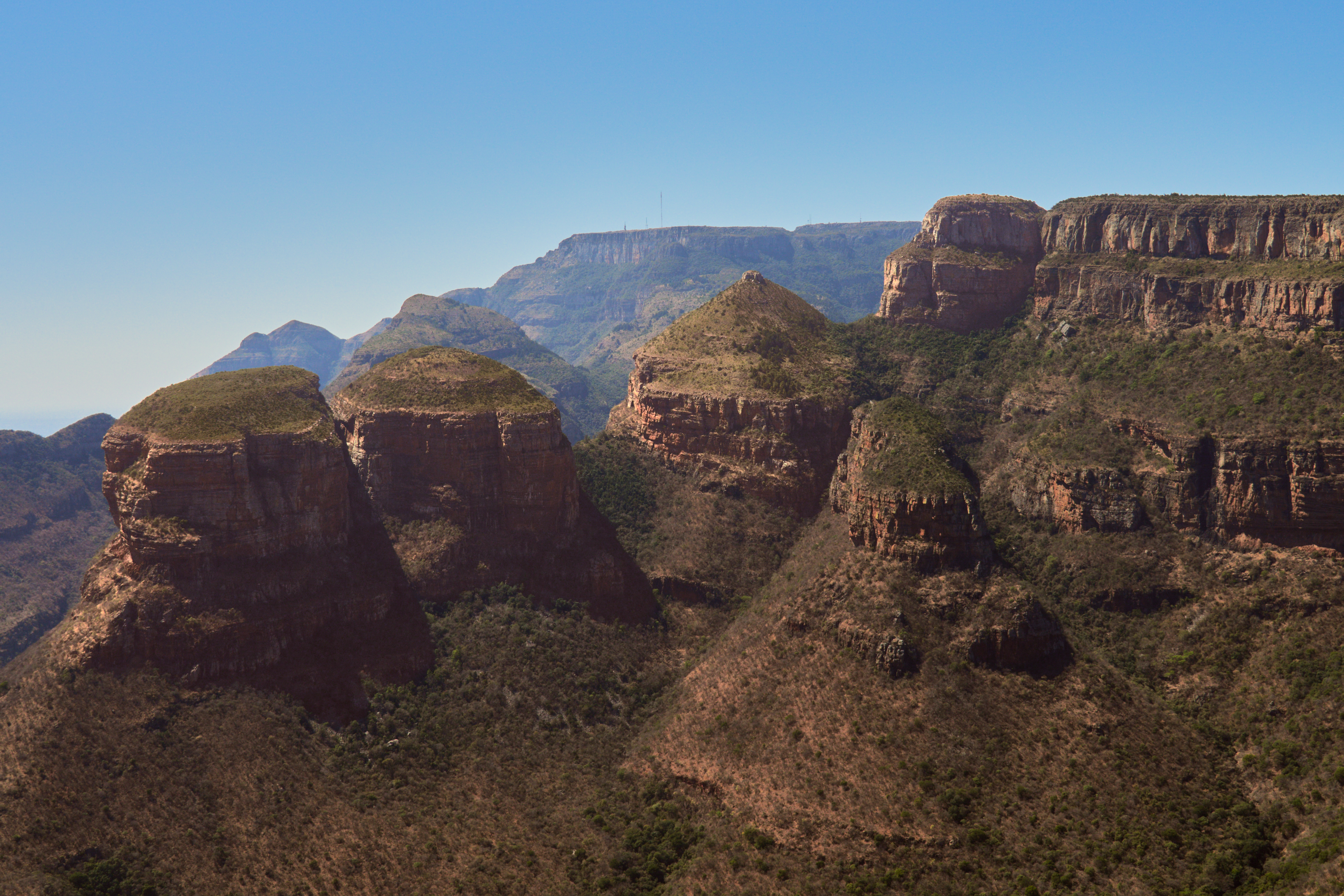
The Three Rondavels, closer look.

The canyon and the surrounding Drakensberg escarpment is a popular tourist region with an established tourism industry supported by public road infrastructure.

== Conservation ==
Catchment-restoration work in the broader Blyde basin has included programmes in the Kruger to Canyons Biosphere Region involving Conservation South Africa, including initiatives on invasive alien plant clearing.
