= Xanthoparmelia hybrida =

Scientific classification
- Kingdom: Fungi
- Division: Ascomycota
- Class: Lecanoromycetes
- Order: Lecanorales
- Family: Parmeliaceae
- Genus: Xanthoparmelia
- Species: X. hybrida

Binomial name
- Xanthoparmelia hybrida Hale (1986)

Species of lichen

Xanthoparmelia hybrida is a rare species of saxicolous (rock-dwelling), foliose lichen in the family Parmeliaceae. Found in South Africa, it was formally described as a new species in 1986 by the American lichenologist Mason Hale. The type specimen was collected from Pilgrim's rest along the Treur River near the Bourkes Luck Potholes, at an elevation of 1,200 m (3,900 ft) (Transvaal), where it was found growing on a sandstone boulder. The lichen has a yellowish-green thallus measuring 6–9 cm (2.4–3.5 in) in diameter, comprising somewhat irregular to linear lobes that measure 1–2.5 mm wide. It contains protocetraric acid, stictic acid, constictic acid, and usnic acid.

== See also ==
- List of Xanthoparmelia species
