= Blyde River =

Motlatse River Blyde River
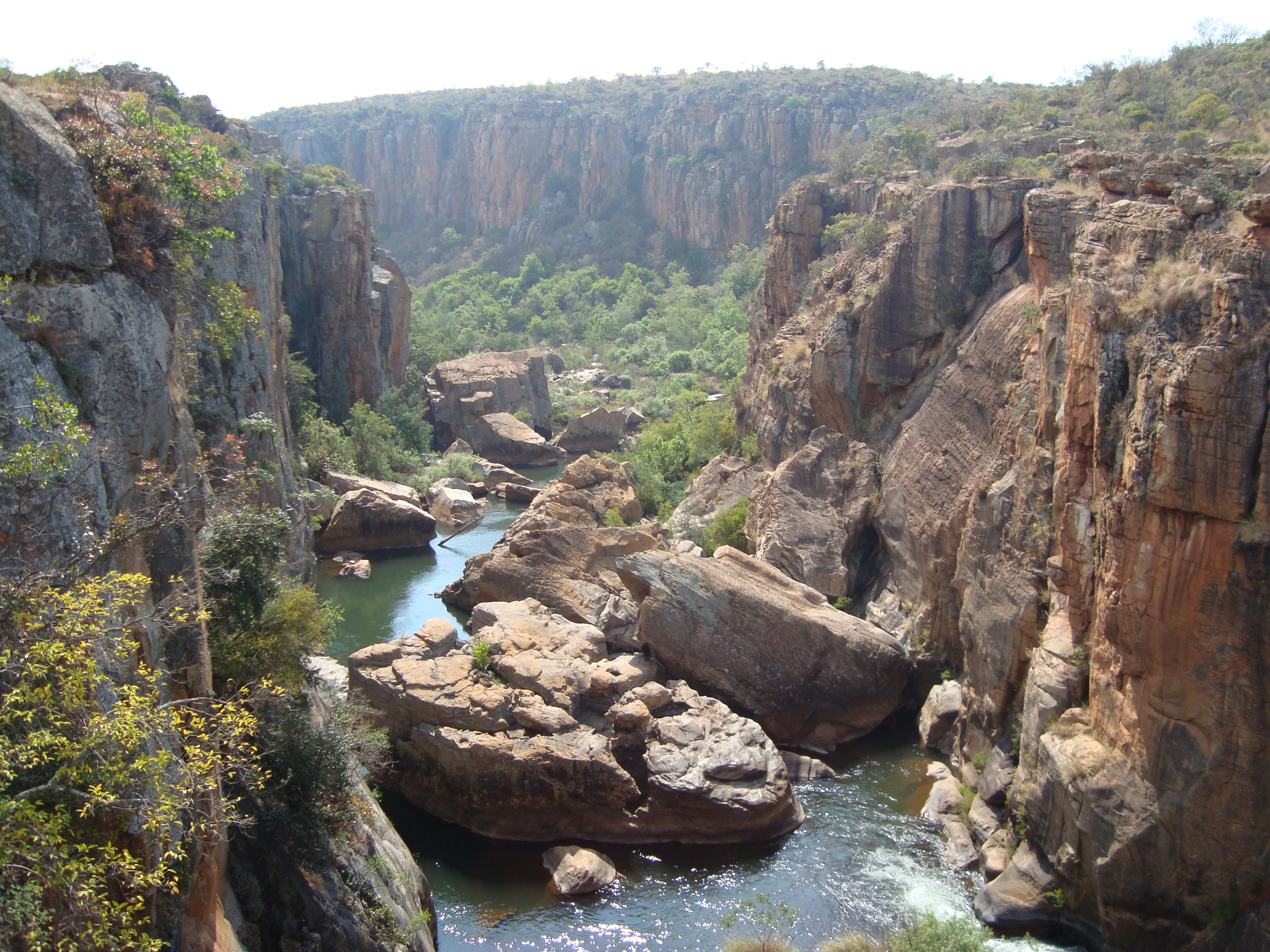
- Motlatse River passing through a sandstone gorge below the Treur confluence

- Location of the Blyde-Olifants confluence

Location
- Country: South Africa
- State: Mpumalanga & Limpopo

Physical characteristics
- Source
  - location: Hartebeesvlakte
  - elevation: 2,000 m (6,600 ft)
- Mouth
  - location: Olifants River, South Africa
  - coordinates: 24°15′17″S 30°49′47″E
- Basin size: 2,842 km^{2} (1,097 sq mi)

The Motlatse River ("Permanent River"), Blyde River (Afrikaans: Blyderivier "Glad River"), or Umdhlazi River is a river in the Mpumalanga and Limpopo provinces of South Africa. It has a northwards course in steep-sided valleys and ravines of the Mpumalanga Drakensberg, before it enters the lowveld region of the Limpopo province. It has its ultimate origins at around 2,000 m altitude in the Hartebeesvlakte conservation area, to the north of Long Tom Pass. It runs through the Blyde River Canyon.

== Etymology ==
The Blyde, meaning "glad", "joyous" or "happy" in Cape Dutch, was thus named during a voortrekker expedition. This occurred in 1844 when Hendrik Potgieter and others returned safely from Delagoa Bay to the rest of their party of trekkers who had considered them dead. While still under this misapprehension they had named the river near their encampment, Treurrivier, or 'mourning river'. The name Motlatse is said to predate the name Blyde, and means 'a river that is always full' in Sepulane.

== Catchment ==
Of the catchment area of 2,842 km², 220 km² is devoted to commercial forestry, and around 1,399 km² consists of indigenous forests. Orchards and croplands were established along the lower Blyde in the latter half of the 20th century, with 23,521 ha devoted to irrigation in 1995. The Hartebeesvlakte, Mount Sheba Nature Reserve, Blyde River Canyon Nature Reserve and Blyde-Olifants Conservancy protect different sections of it.

== Tributaries ==
In the Blyde River Canyon Nature Reserve it is joined by several rivers or streams. The Treur River joins the Blyde at Bourke's Luck Potholes, in the canyon's upper reaches. Downstream it is joined by the Belvedere and Ga-nogakgolo creeks.

The now defunct Belvedere power station (at 24°39′18″S 30°50′12″E) is situated at the confluence of the Blyde and Belvedere. From 1911 up to 1992 it supplied hydro-electric power to Pilgrim's Rest and adjacent communities. A day hiking trail of some 10 km allows a visitor to explore this area.

The Ohrigstad River joins the Blyde River at the Blyderivierpoort Dam. The river branches into several irrigation canals once it enters the lowveld. The Sandspruit is its only significant lowveld tributary, not far from the Olifants confluence.

== Downstream course and contribution ==
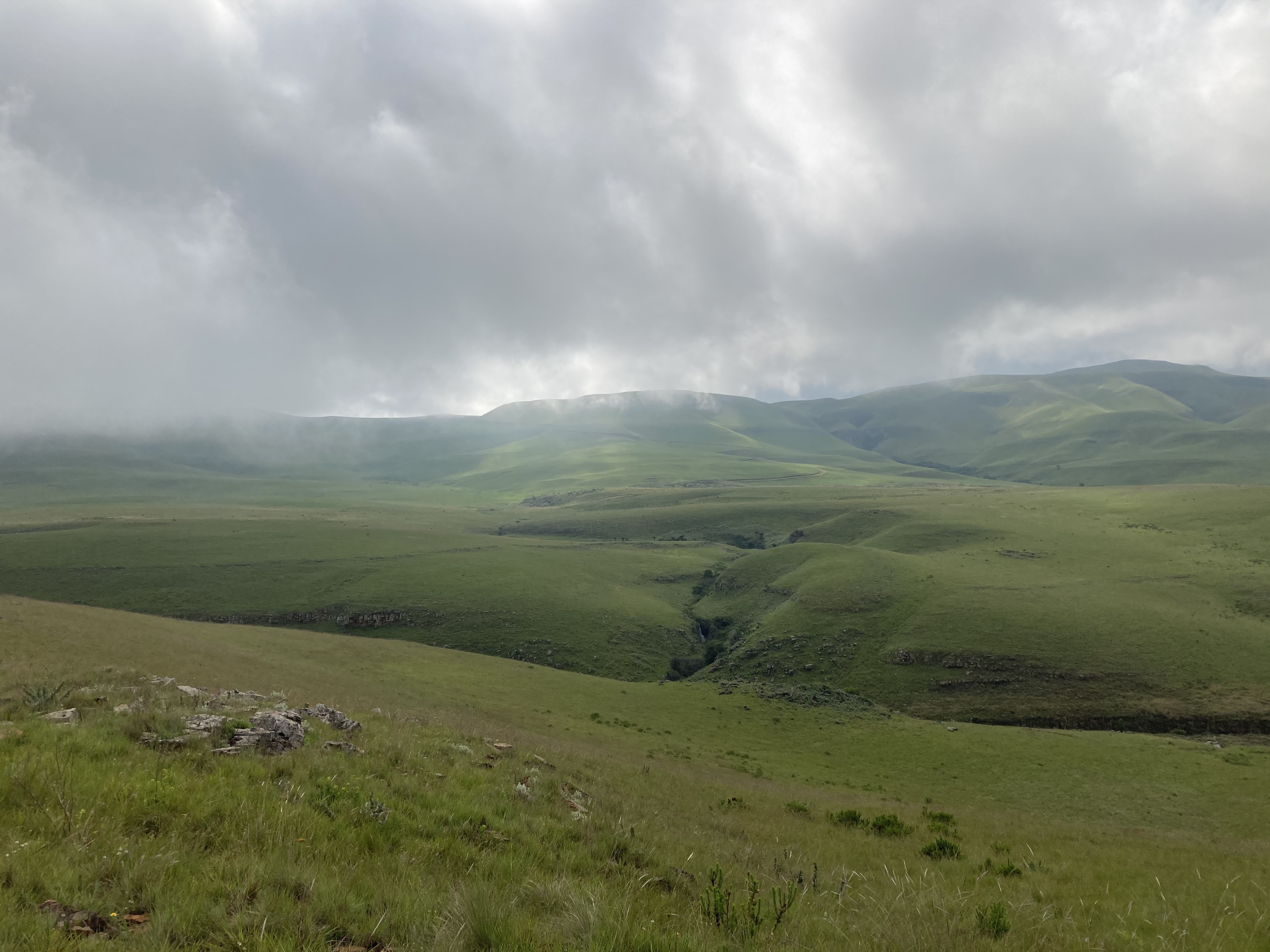
The Blyde River has its origin in the well-watered uplands of Hartebeesvlakte

The Klein Olifants, Steelpoort and Blyde Rivers are southern tributaries of the Olifants River, which enters the Kruger National Park and neighbouring private game reserves, eventually crossing the Mozambique border, where it flows into the Massingir Dam. The Blyde's average annual contribution to the Olifants is 436 million m^{3} of water, a significant proportion due to the combination of relatively high precipitation and low evaporation in its catchment area.

== Fish species ==
Exotic fish like smallmouth bass, largemouth bass, brown trout and rainbow trout occur in the river, which have reduced the range of the local Treur River barb to upper catchments of the Blyde River system. Thanks to reintroductions after its rediscovery in the 1970s, the Treur River barb now flourishes. The Natal mountain catfish, Amphilius natalensis, occurs as an isolated population in the Limpopo system, and the Belvedere creek is the only place in the Limpopo system where the Rosefin barb, Barbus argenteus, is found. Smallscale yellowfish and largescale yellowfish are also found in the lower reaches of the river.

== See also ==
- List of rivers of South Africa
- List of reservoirs and dams in South Africa
