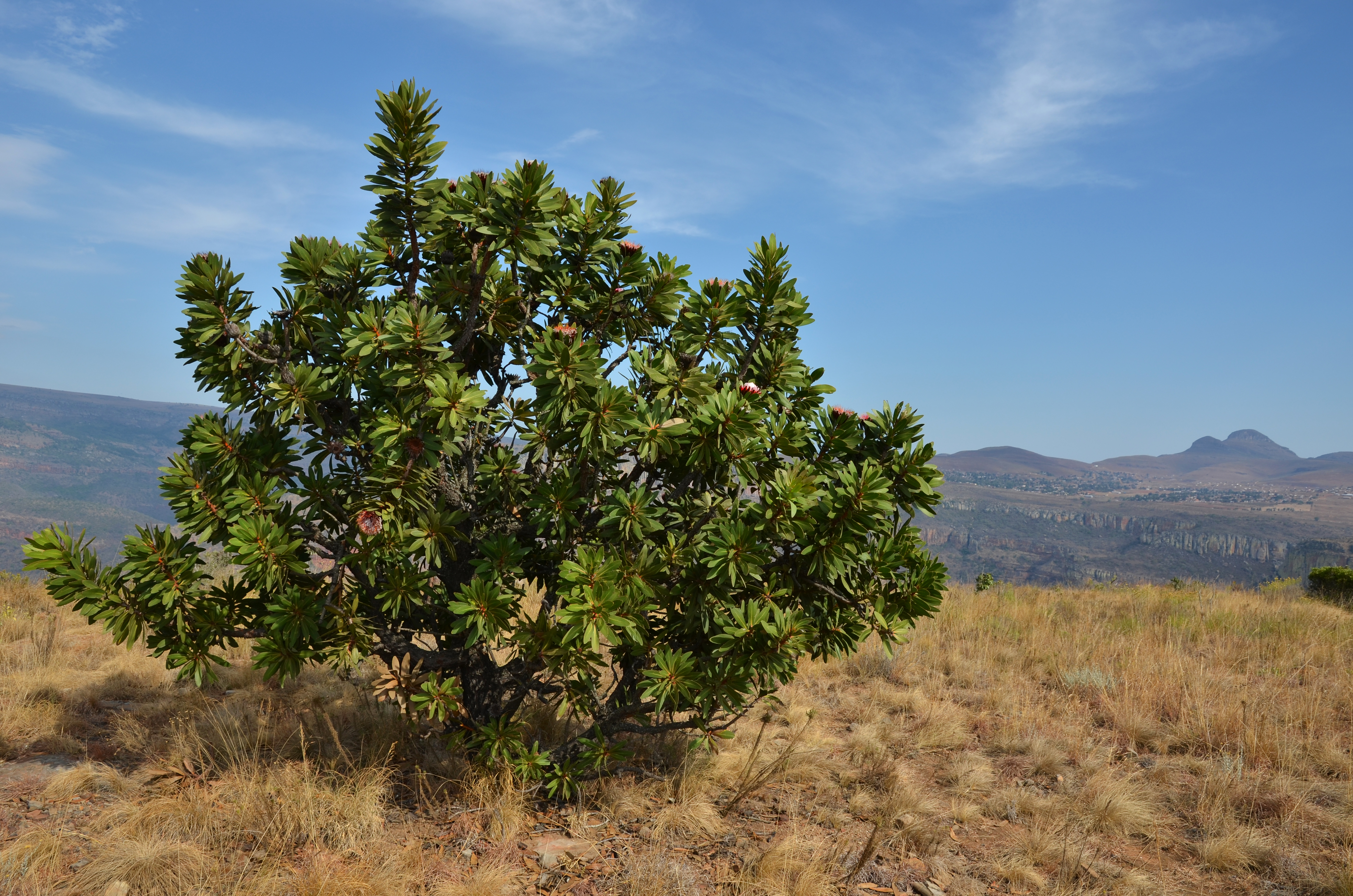

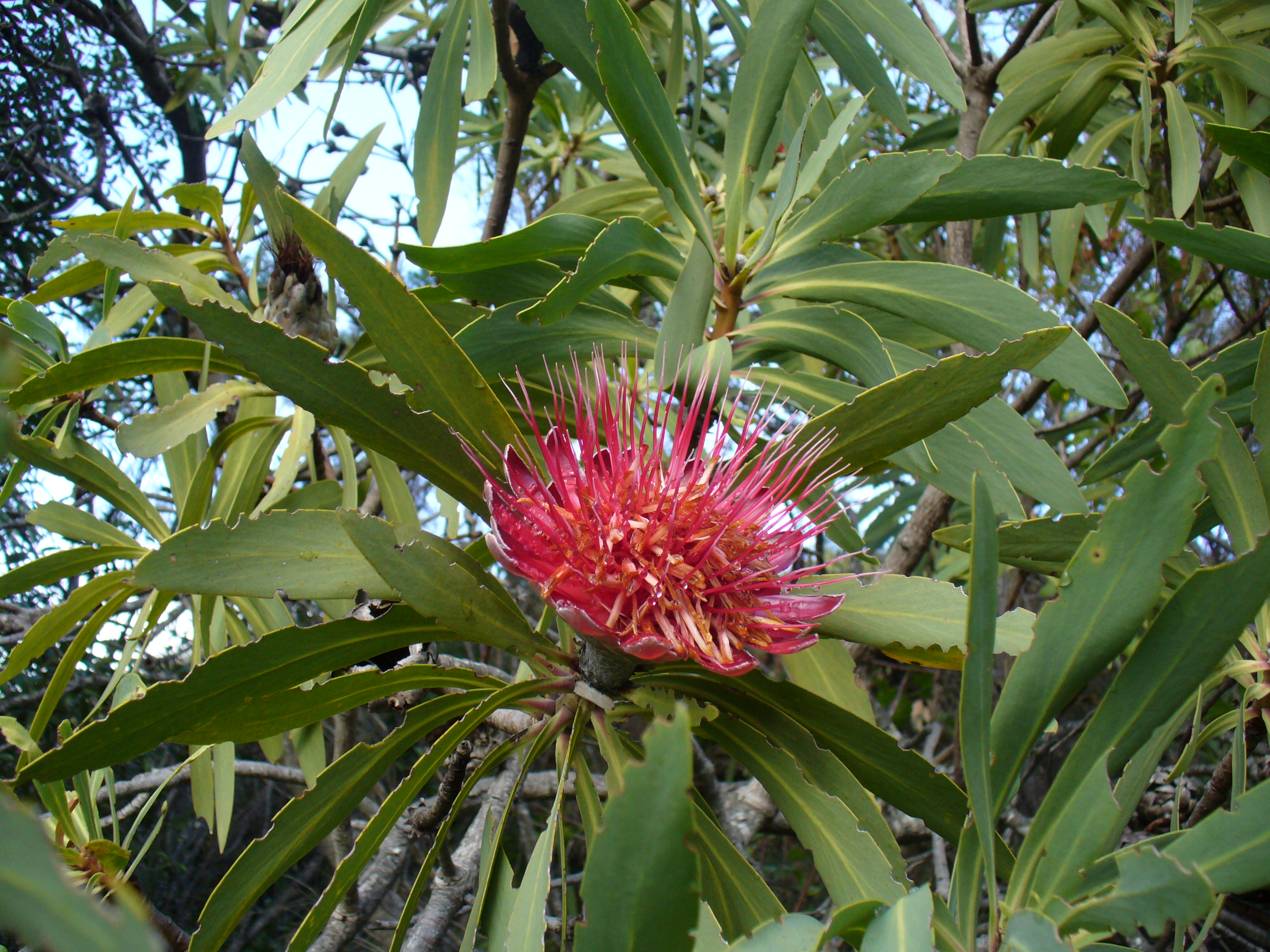
- Habit and flower head

Conservation status
- Endangered (IUCN 3.1)

Scientific classification
- Kingdom: Plantae
- Clade: Embryophytes
- Clade: Tracheophytes
- Clade: Angiosperms
- Clade: Eudicots
- Order: Proteales
- Family: Proteaceae
- Genus: Protea
- Species: P. laetans

Binomial name
- Protea laetans L.E.Davidson

= Protea laetans =

Blyde River protea

Species of flowering plant

Protea laetans, the Blyde River protea or Blyde sugarbush, is a species of flowering plant in the family Proteaceae. It was recognised as a species in 1970, and is endemic to the Blyde River Canyon of the Mpumalanga escarpment, South Africa. The slender plants are up to 5 m (16 ft) tall and flower from mid to late summer. The bracts of their closed flower heads are shiny and silvery in appearance. They are most easily viewed near the F.H. Odendaal camp of the Blyde River Canyon Nature Reserve. Laetans means joyous, i.e. Blyde.

== Gallery ==
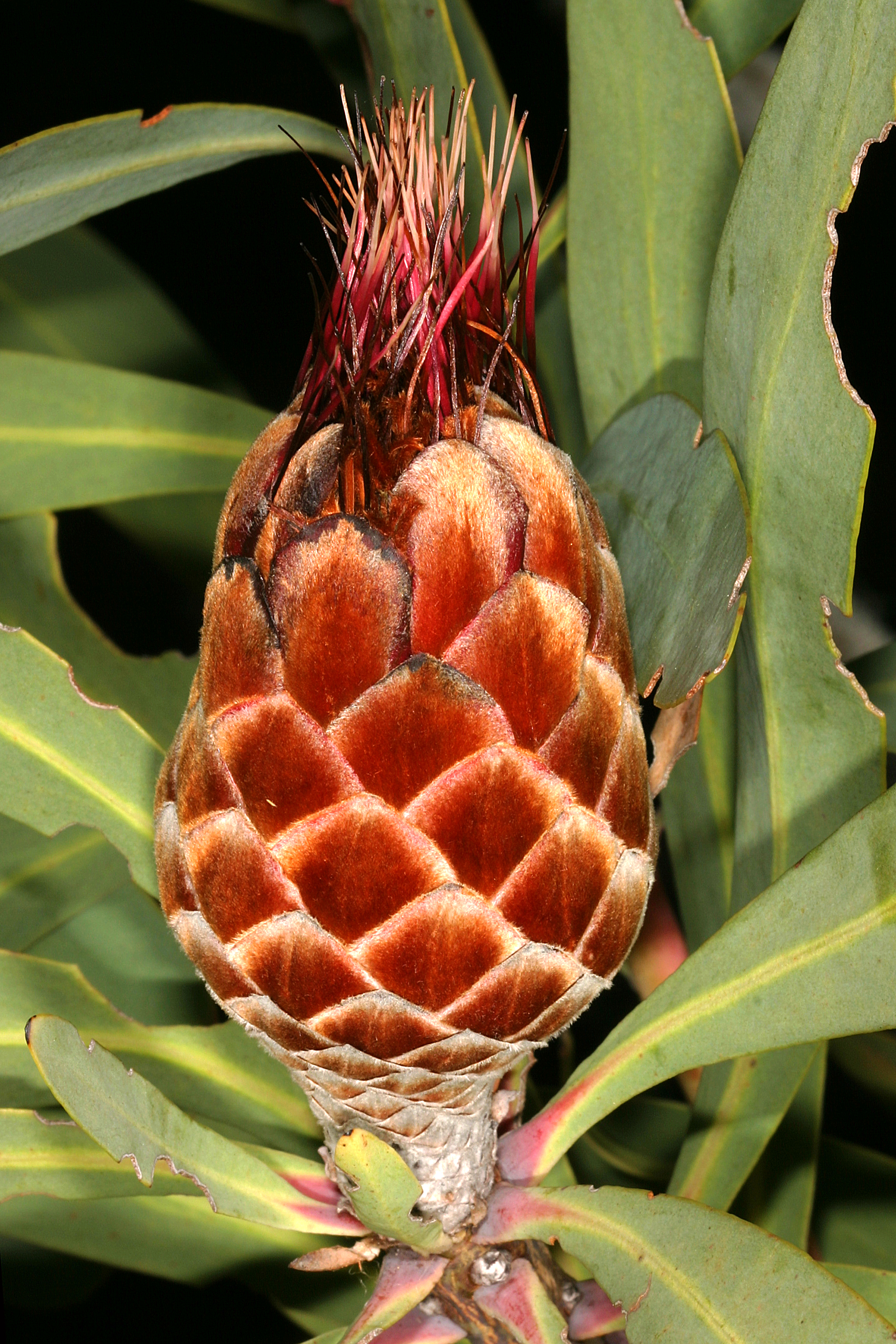
Flower head

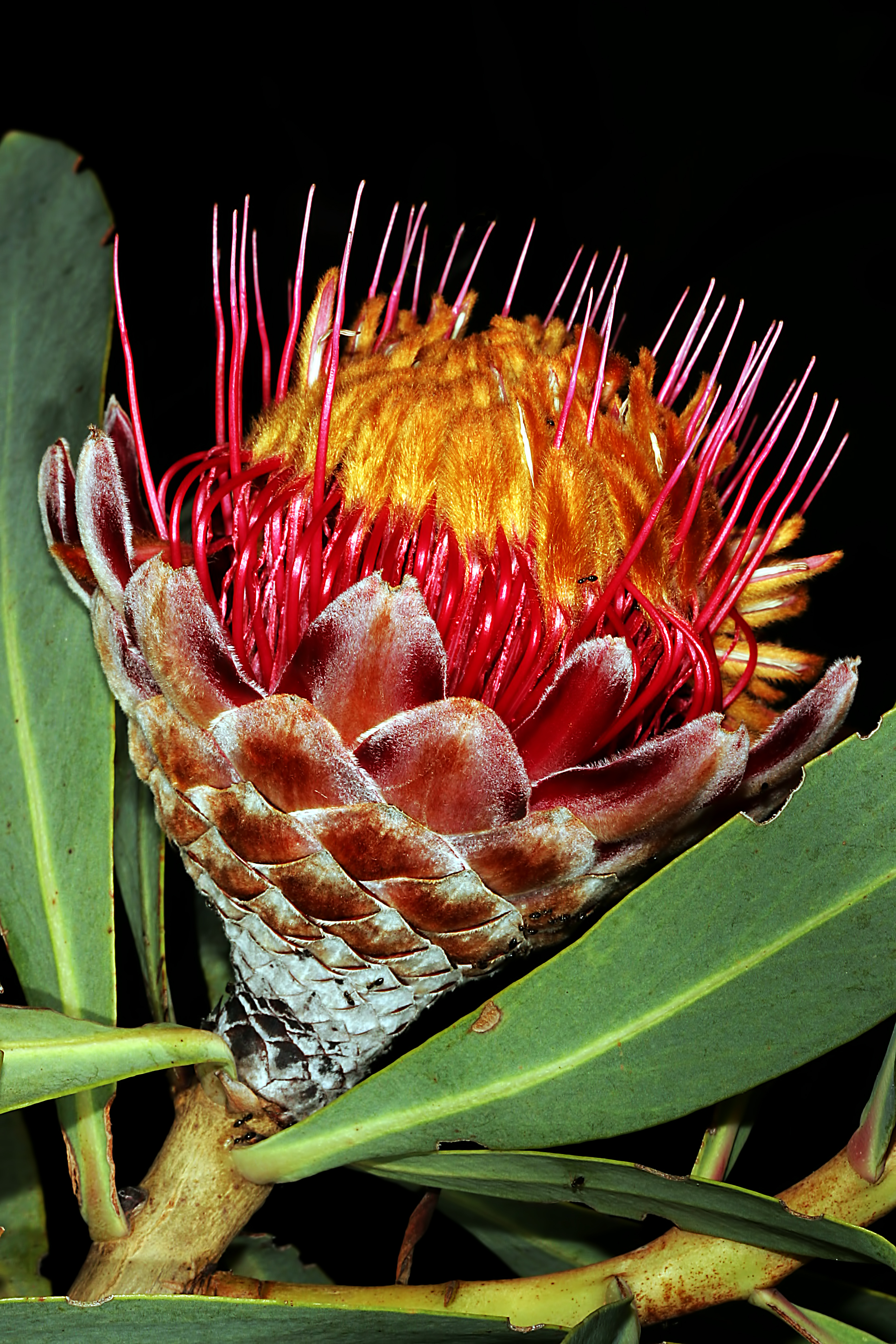
Flower head
