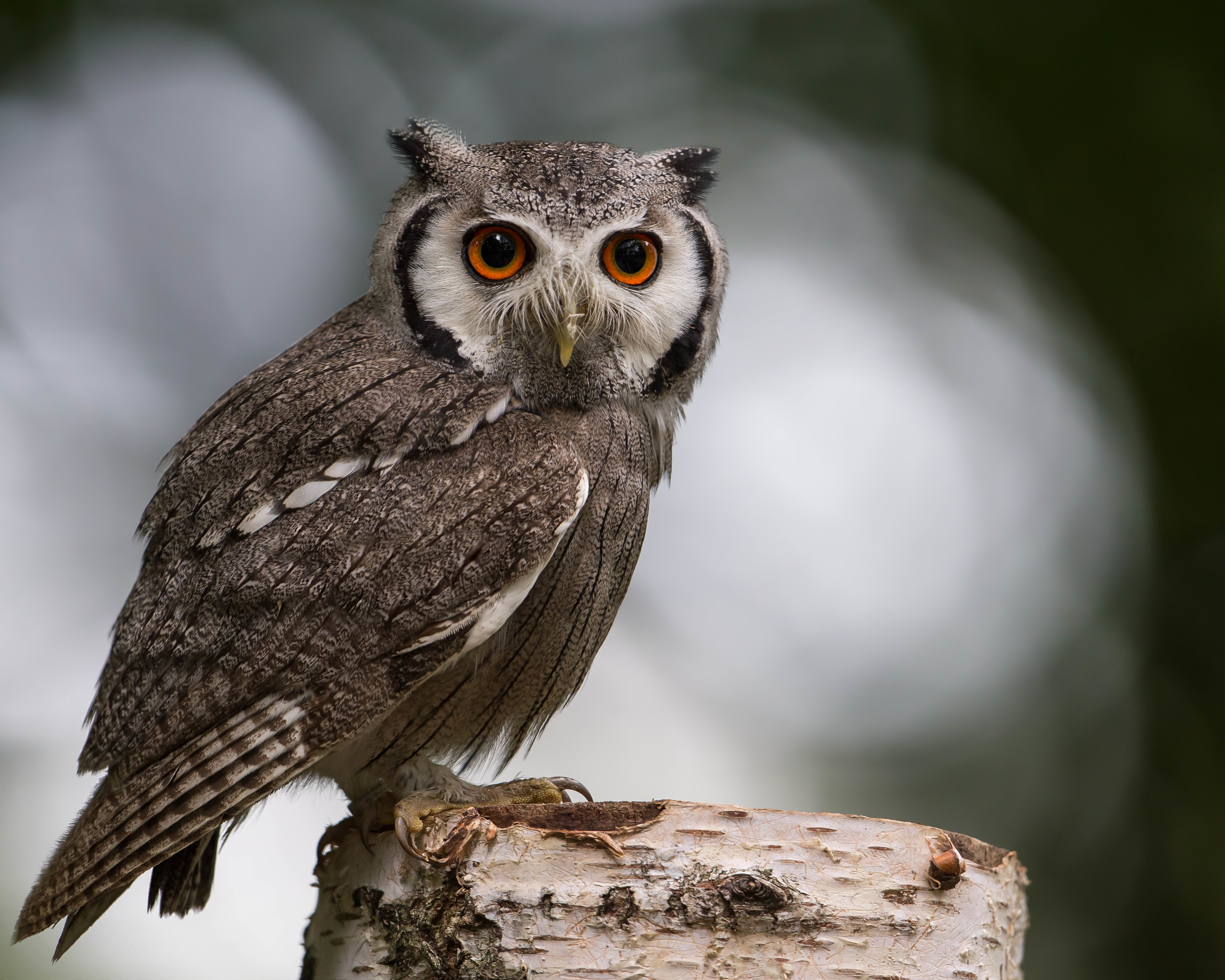
- Near Chobe River, Botswana

Conservation status
- Least Concern (IUCN 3.1)
- CITES Appendix II (CITES)

Scientific classification
- Kingdom: Animalia
- Phylum: Chordata
- Class: Aves
- Order: Strigiformes
- Family: Strigidae
- Genus: Ptilopsis
- Species: P. granti

Binomial name
- Ptilopsis granti (Kollibay, 1910)

Synonyms
- Ptilopsis erlangeri

= Southern white-faced owl =

Species of owl

The Southern white-faced owl (Ptilopsis granti) is a fairly small owl in the family Strigidae. It is native to the southern half of Africa. It was formerly regarded as a subspecies of the northern white-faced owl (P. leucopsis) but the two are now commonly treated as separate species.

== Description ==
It is 22–28 cm (8.7–11.0 in) long and weighs 185–220 g (6.5–7.8 oz). The upperparts are grey with dark streaks and there are white spots on the scapular feathers. The underparts are whitish with dark streaks. The face is white with a black border and black around the large orange eyes. The head has two short ear-tufts with black tips. Juvenile birds have a greyish face. The northern white-faced owl is usually paler and browner with reduced streaking below.

Their call is a series of fast, bubbling hoots, uttered at night and frequently repeated. These fast, staccato notes followed by a longer and higher-pitched 'hoot' are extensively used during breeding season and pairs of owls often sing together. The Northern white-faced owl has a very different two-note call.

== Distribution ==
Southern white-faced owls occur patchily in the western regions central and southern Africa, including Gabon, Republic of Congo, Democratic Republic of the Congo and Angola. They seem to be more common in regions such as Uganda, southern Kenya and Tanzania, as well as Zambia, Namibia, Botswana, Zimbabwe, Mozambique, Eswatini and the northern regions of South Africa.

== Habitat and diet ==
It inhabits savanna and dry woodland. It is usually seen alone or in pairs. It mainly hunts large insects, as well as occasional small mammals, birds and reptiles.

== Nesting ==
The eggs are usually laid in the old nest of another bird. The clutch contains two or three eggs which are incubated for about 30 days. The young birds leave the nest about a month after hatching.

== Temperature adaptability ==
After the summer, southern white-faced owls increase their resting metabolic rate by approximately 45% to adjust to the climate changes. Furthermore, the owls do this to increase cold temperature tolerance which is unusual for these creatures. Not only that, but the BMR (Basal Metabolic Rate) of the owl is lower than what is expected of other birds of a similar size to help them when there is a lack of food. This is unusual considering the lack of food and other survival resources during the winter.
