= Treur River barb =

Conservation status
- Critically Endangered (IUCN 3.1)

Scientific classification
- Kingdom: Animalia
- Phylum: Chordata
- Class: Actinopterygii
- Order: Cypriniformes
- Family: Cyprinidae
- Subfamily: Smiliogastrinae
- Genus: Enteromius
- Species: E. treurensis

Binomial name
- Enteromius treurensis Groenewald, 1958

Synonyms
- Barbus treurensis

Species of fish

The Treur River barb (Enteromius treurensis) or simply Treur barb is a species of cyprinid fish. It is endemic to northern Mpumalanga, South Africa.

== Status ==
Exotic fish like smallmouth bass, brown and rainbow trout were introduced to the Blyde, which reduced its range to upper catchments of the Blyde River system. It disappeared from the Treur River in the 1960s, but during the 1970s it was rediscovered in the upper Blyde River, an area that received National Heritage status in 1985. It was reintroduced to the Treur and upper Blyde rivers, where it now flourishes.

It occurs alongside the Natal mountain catfish (Amphilius natalensis), that occurs here as an isolated population in the Limpopo system.

== See also ==
- Blyde River Canyon Nature Reserve
