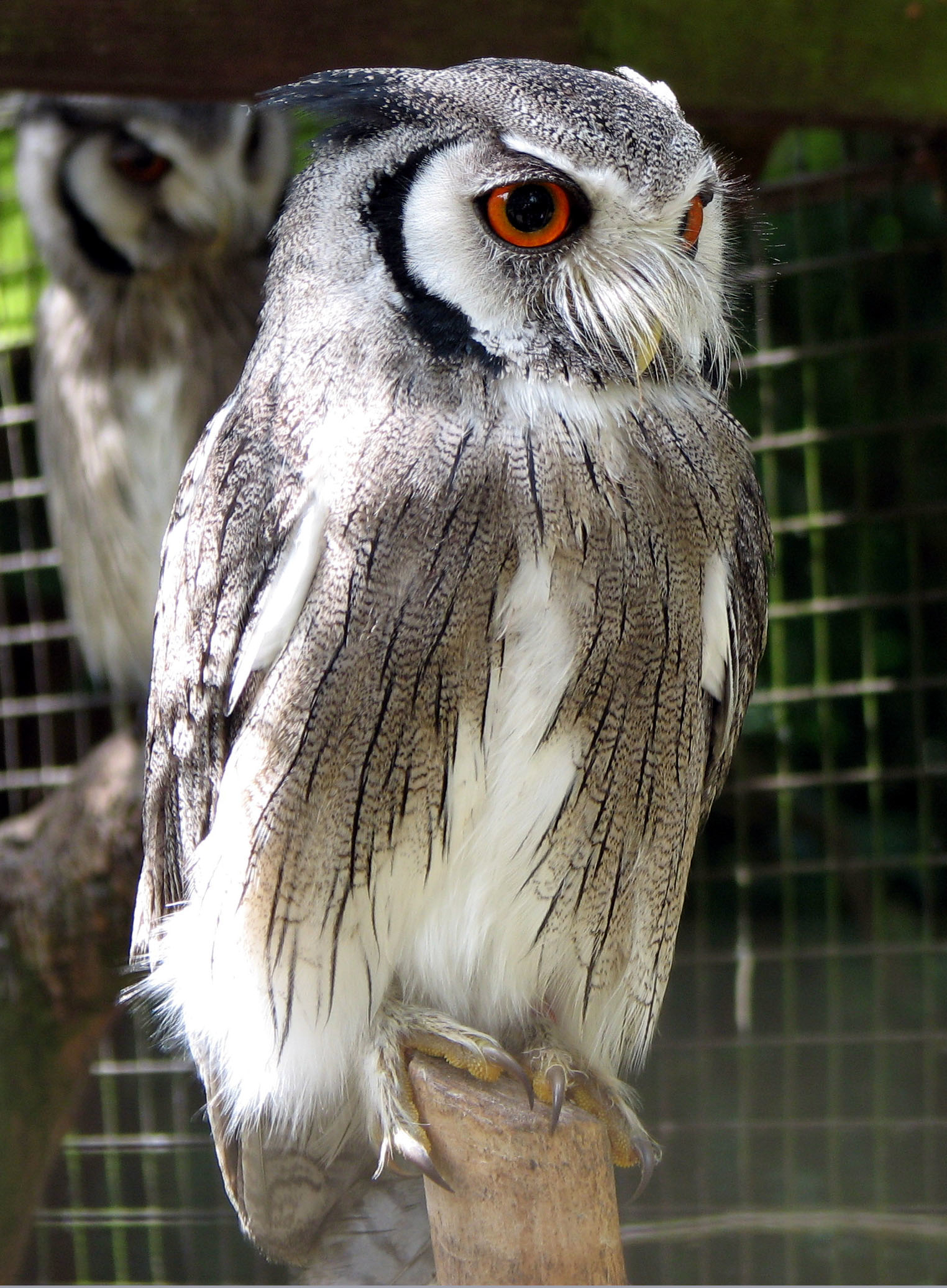

Conservation status
- Least Concern (IUCN 3.1)
- CITES Appendix II

Scientific classification
- Kingdom: Animalia
- Phylum: Chordata
- Class: Aves
- Order: Strigiformes
- Family: Strigidae
- Genus: Ptilopsis
- Species: P. leucotis

Binomial name
- Ptilopsis leucotis (Temminck, 1820)

Synonyms
- Otus leucotis

= Northern white-faced owl =

Species of owl

The northern white-faced owl (Ptilopsis leucotis) is a species of owl in the family Strigidae. The southern white-faced owl (P. granti) was formerly included in this species and the two were known as the white-faced scops-owl.

It is found in a band across Africa between the Sahara and the Equator. It occurs in Benin, Burkina Faso, Cameroon, Central African Republic, Chad, Republic of the Congo, Ivory Coast, Djibouti, Eritrea, Ethiopia, Gambia, Ghana, Guinea, Guinea-Bissau, Kenya, Liberia, Mali, Mauritania, Niger, Nigeria, Senegal, Sierra Leone, Somalia, Sudan, Togo and Uganda.

== Fight-or-flight response ==
This owl has a rather notable defense mechanism. When faced with a similar-sized predator (like another owl slightly larger than it), the bird flares its wings to appear larger. When faced with something much larger than itself (such as an eagle), it pulls its feathers inwards, elongates its body, and narrows its eyes to thin slits. It is thought that it uses this ability to camouflage itself, and it shares the ability with relatives like the African scops owl.

Many different types of owls have some ability to adopt a "concealing posture", also known by the German word Tarnstellung, in which they squeeze and thin their body to look like a broken tree branch, and some types may also narrow their eyes to slits and fold a wing sideways across their chest in a Dracula-like manner to hide the lighter-colored feathers on their underparts. Such behavior has also been documented in Eastern screech owls in a natural setting reacting to threats.

== In popular culture ==
A member of this species named "Popo-chan" was the subject of a Japanese television show, during which the species' concealing posture was demonstrated.

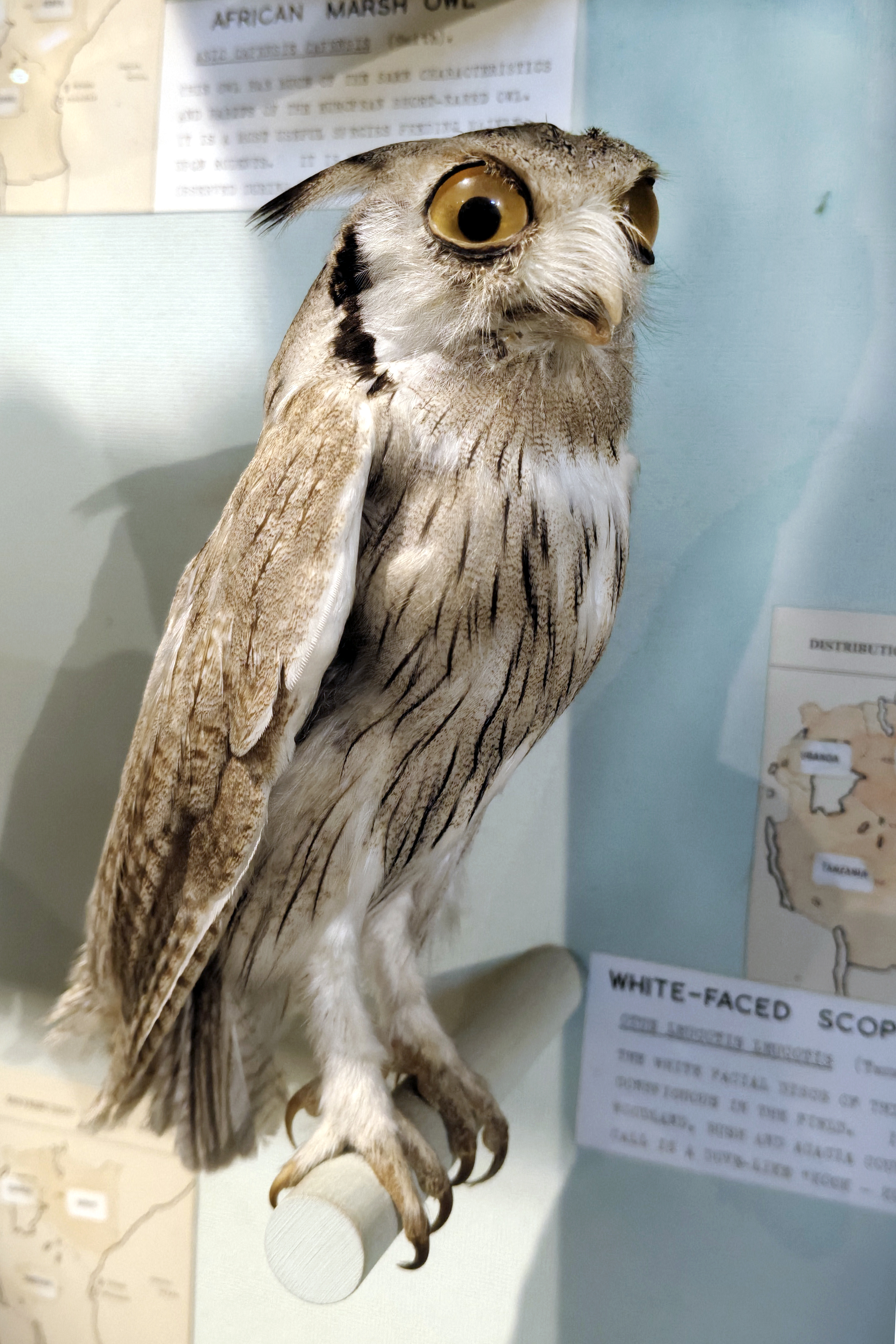
Northern white-faced owl taxidermy at Nairobi National Museum
