= Blyde-Olifants Conservancy =

Game farm group

- Location within Limpopo
- Location: Limpopo, South Africa
- Nearest city: Hoedspruit
- Coordinates: 24°14′13″S 30°49′25″E

Blyde-Olifants Conservancy, The Conservancy consolidates a group of privately owned game farms in the central Lowveld region into an official nature reserve. Lying roughly between Hoedspruit and Phalaborwa. Through the conservancy run two incredibly different rivers - on the one hand is the river most often associated with the colour brown - the powerful Olifants River - behind which runs the Drakensberg escarpment, creating a striking backdrop, whilst on the other is the clear, sparkling Blyde River, a tributary of the Olifants River.

== Wildlife ==
Include: Spotted hyena, kudu, South African giraffe, African leopard, squirrel and plains zebra, whilst the rivers are well occupied with hippo and crocodiles.

== See also ==
- Protected areas of South Africa
