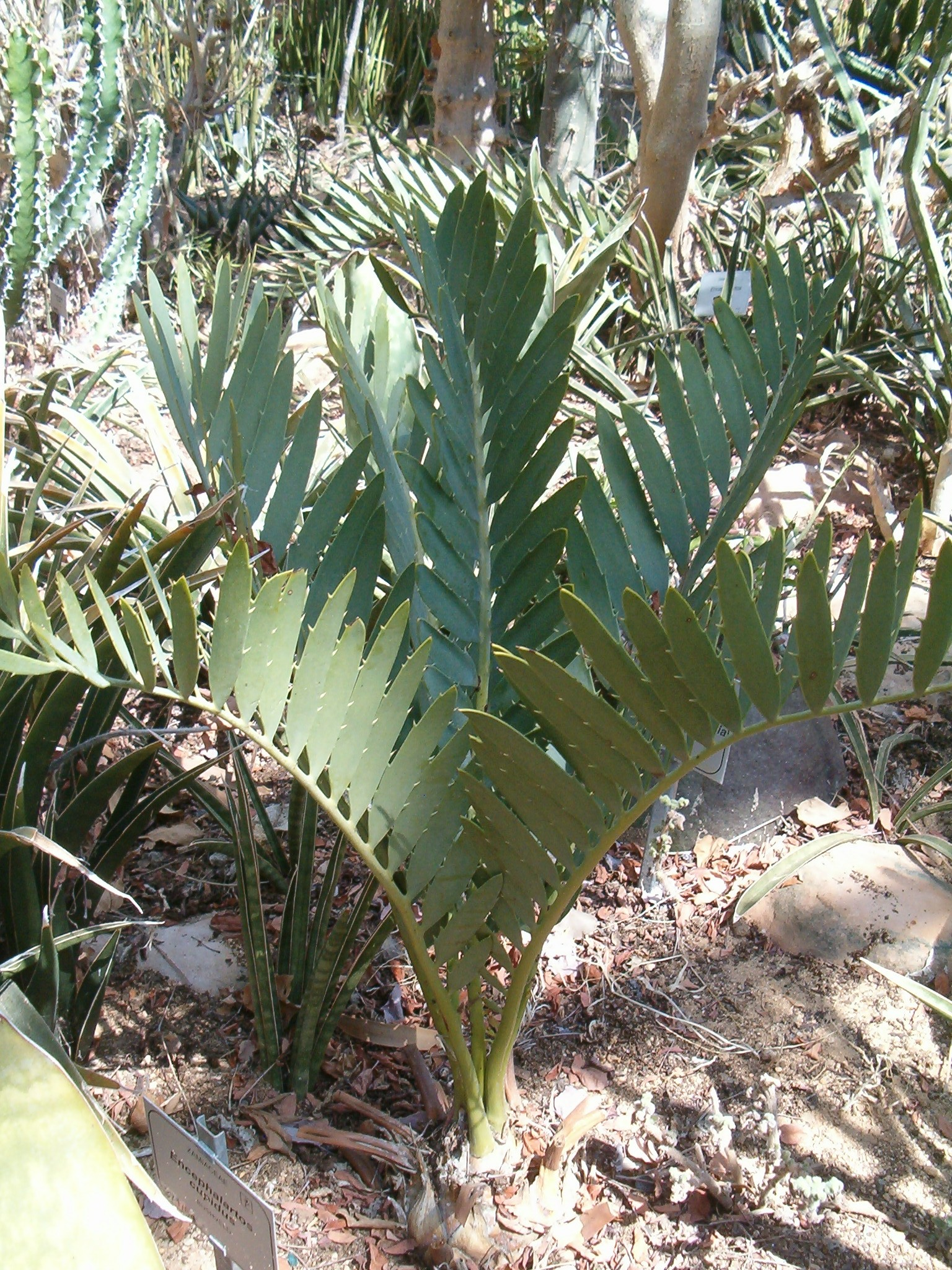

Conservation status
- Critically Endangered (IUCN 3.1)
- CITES Appendix I (CITES)

Scientific classification
- Kingdom: Plantae
- Clade: Tracheophytes
- Clade: Gymnospermae
- Division: Cycadophyta
- Class: Cycadopsida
- Order: Cycadales
- Family: Zamiaceae
- Genus: Encephalartos
- Species: E. cupidus

Binomial name
- Encephalartos cupidus R.A.Dyer

= Encephalartos cupidus =

Species of cycad

Encephalartos cupidus is a species of cycad that is found in the Limpopo Province, South Africa at elevations of 700 up to 1,500.

== Description ==
This is a small, stemless cycad that grows 15–40 cm tall and 20–30 cm in diameter. It doesn't have branches, but secondary stems can sprout from shoots at its base. Its pinnate leaves form a crown at the top, reaching up to 100 cm in length. Each leaf is made up of lanceolate leaflets with spiny edges, arranged at an angle of 50-100° along the rachis. This species is dioecious, producing solitary male cones that are apple green, fusiform, and 18–30 cm long, and pedunculated. The female cones are ovoid, usually solitary but sometimes in pairs, and 20–30 cm long. The seeds are ovoid, 25–35 mm long, 15–20 mm wide, and covered with apricot-colored sarcotesta.
