= Treur River =

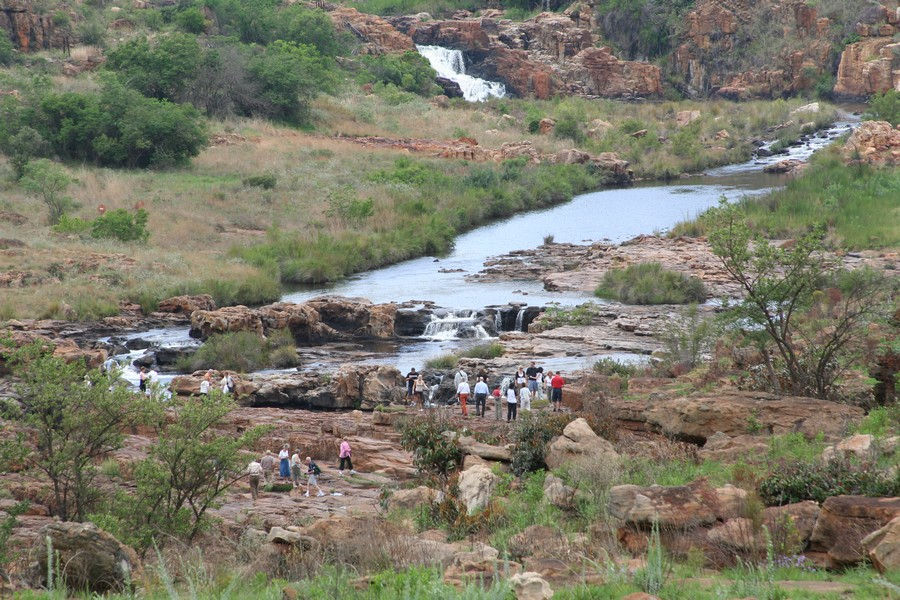
The Treur River at its confluence with the Blyde at Bourke's Luck Potholes

The Treur River (from Afrikaans: mourning river) also known as the Sefogwane River is a small river in the Drakensberg escarpment region of eastern Mpumalanga province, South Africa. The R532 motor route intersects it twice. Its ultimate origin is inside the Blyde River Canyon Nature Reserve, though most of its course is to the west of this protected area. It is a tributary of the Blyde River, and has no major tributaries of its own. There are two sharp drops in its course, at Poe Falls 24°45′S 30°52′E and Bourke's Luck Potholes respectively.

== Etymology and Names ==
The sePulana name for the river is Sefogwane.

Treur means "mourning" in Dutch, and was thus named during a voortrekker expedition. In 1844, while still under the misapprehension that Hendrik Potgieter and his party had perished on their journey to Delagoa Bay, their distraught relatives named the river near their encampment, Treurrivier, or 'mourning river'.

== Treur River Barb ==
The Treur river is home to the Treur River Barb, a species of cyprinid fish that is endemic to Northern Mpumalanga. It was thought to be driven to extinction by the introduction of exotic fish, but was rediscovered in the Blyde River in 1985. The Treur River Barb was subsequently reintroduced to the Treur River.

== Gallery ==
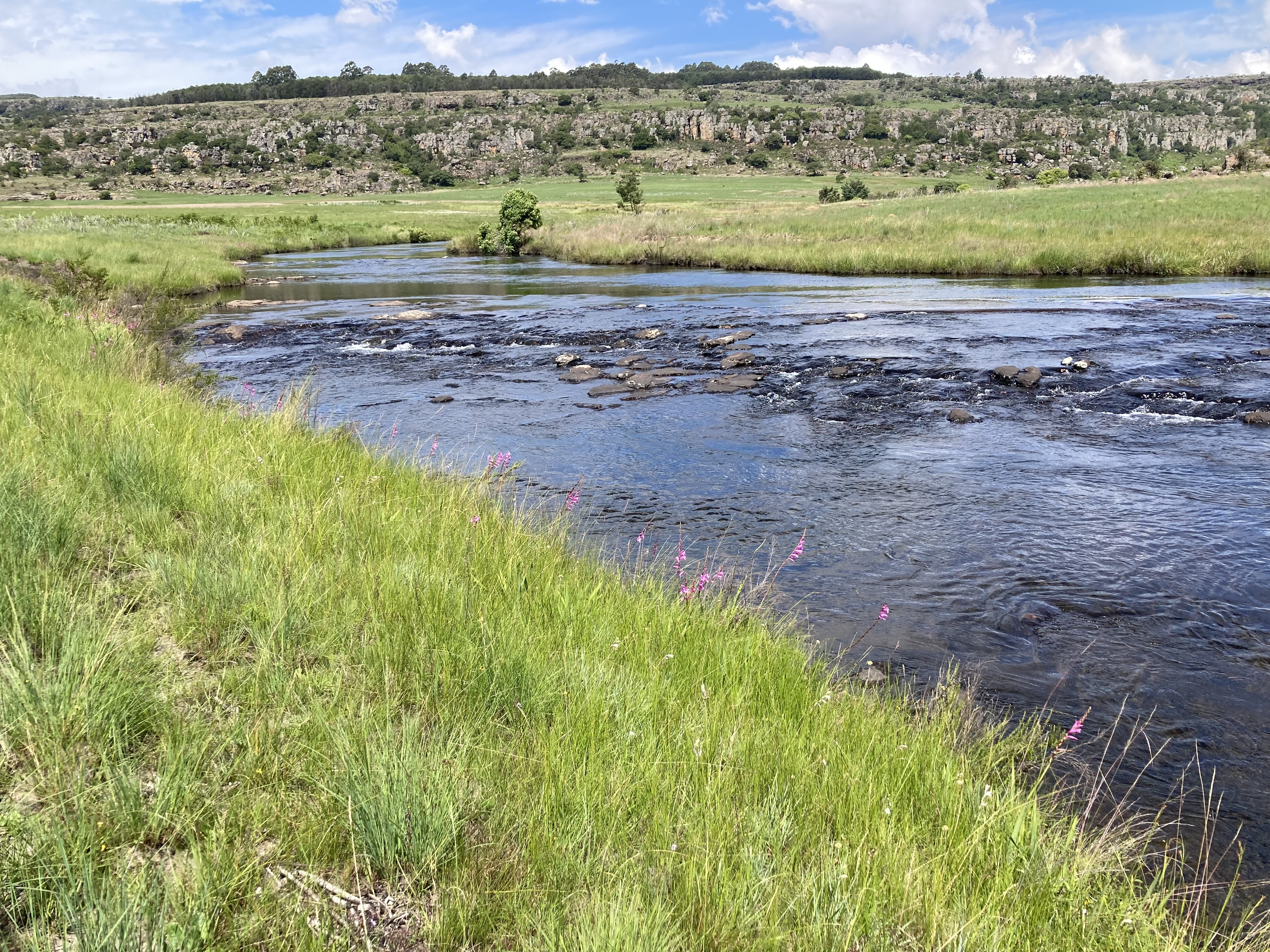
Watsonia Bella growing along the Treur River

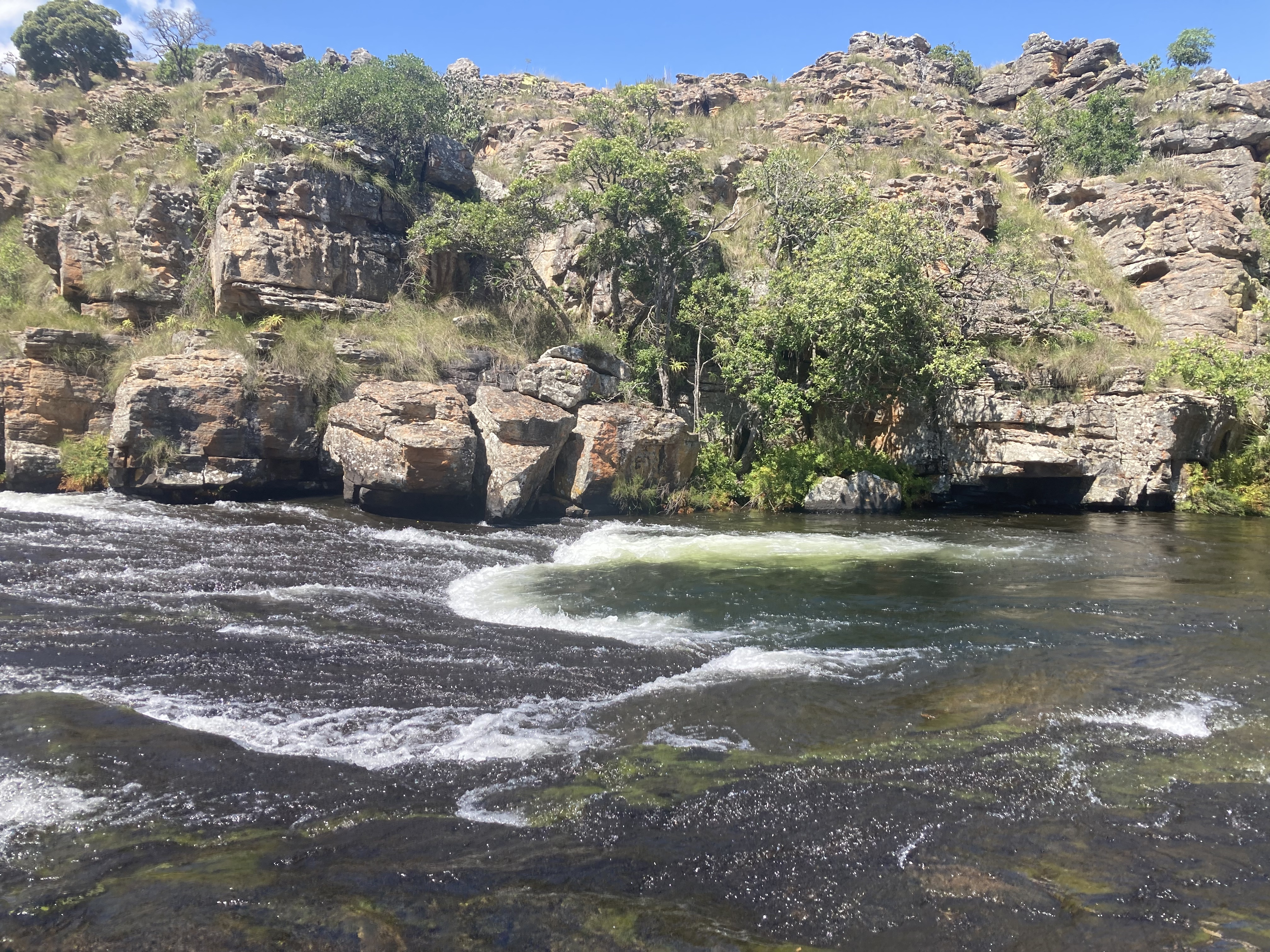
A rock pool in the Treur River

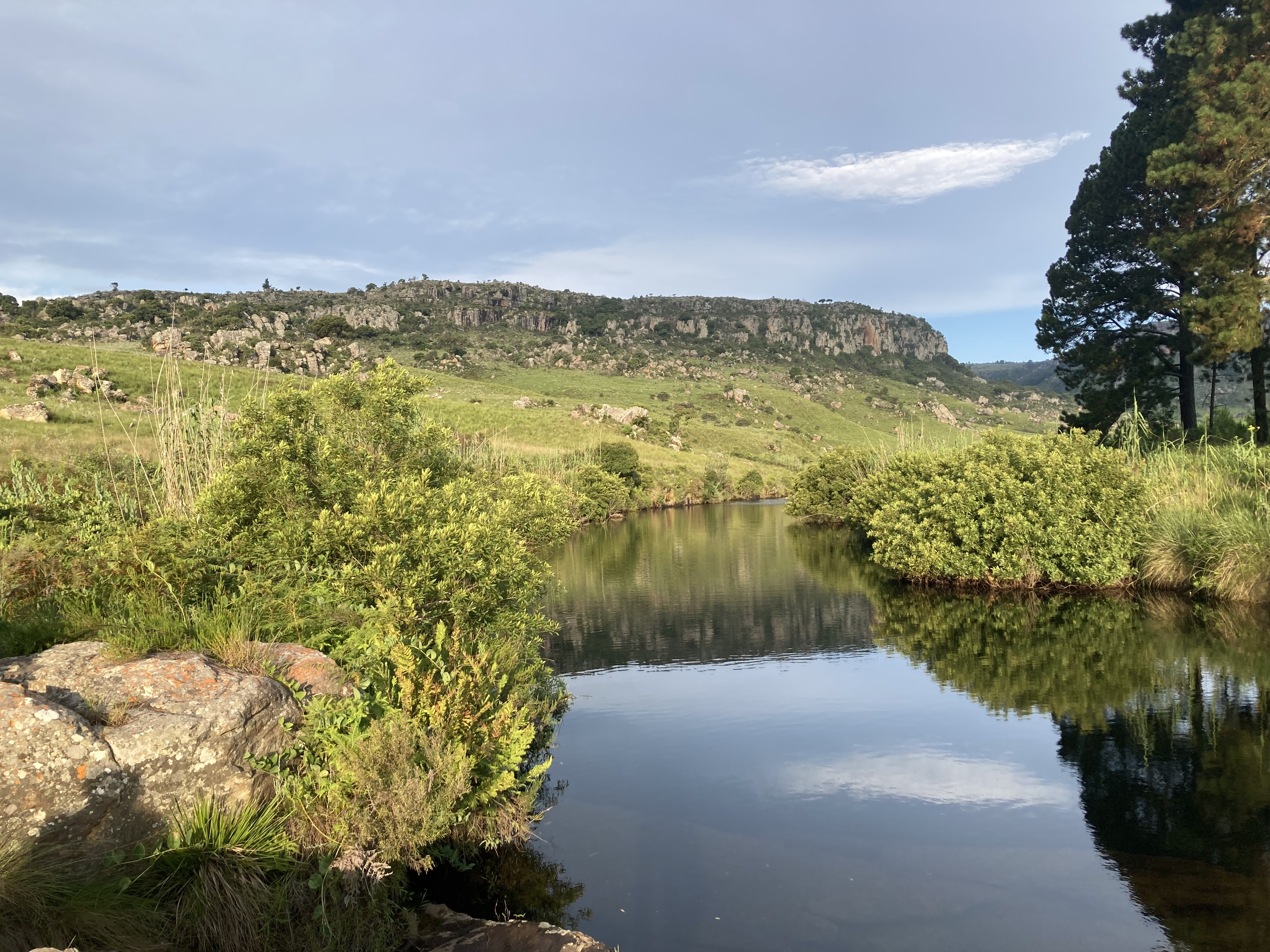
Treur River near the Clear Stream Hiking Hut

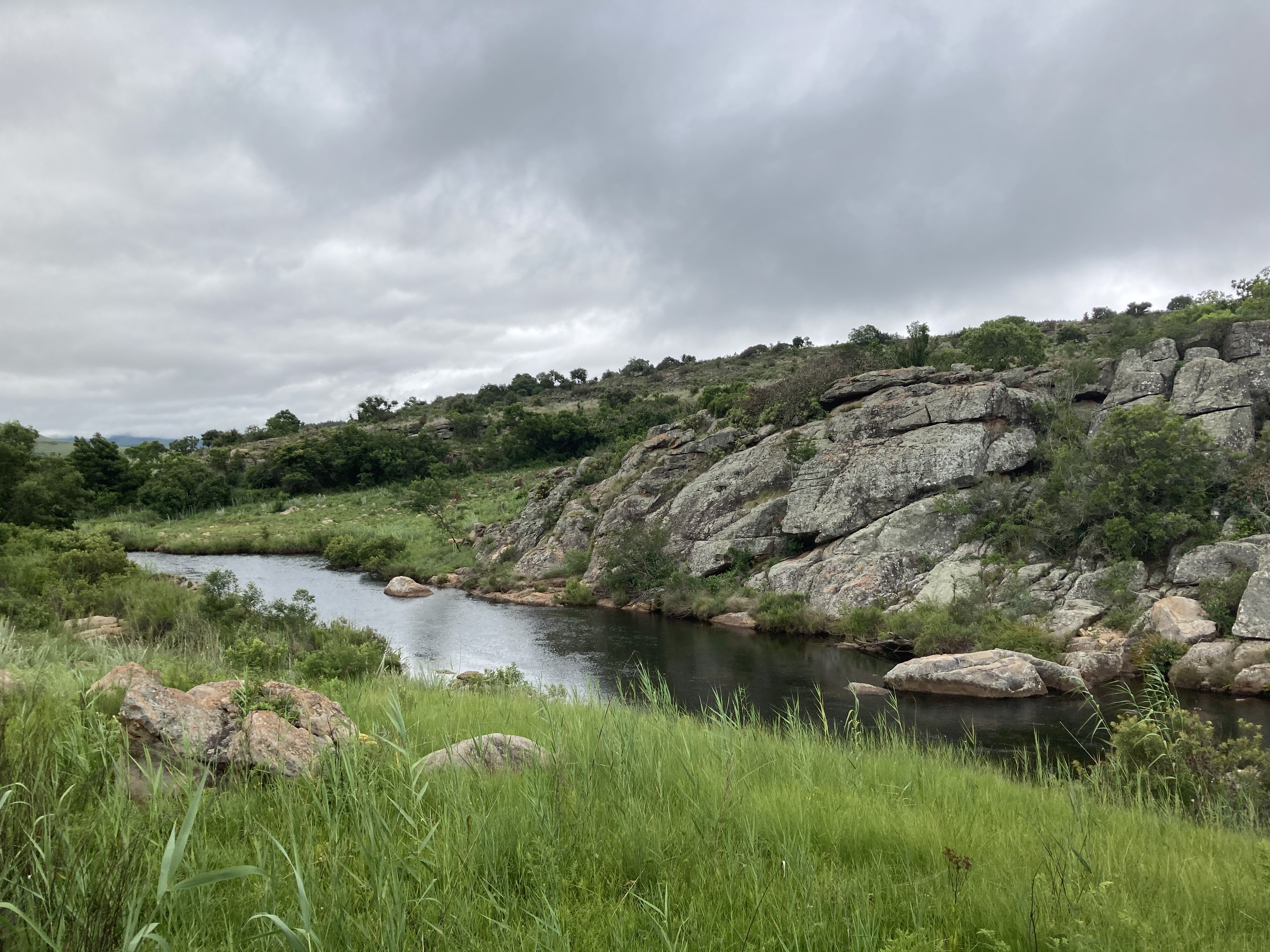
Treur River in midsummer

== See also ==
- Treur River Barb
