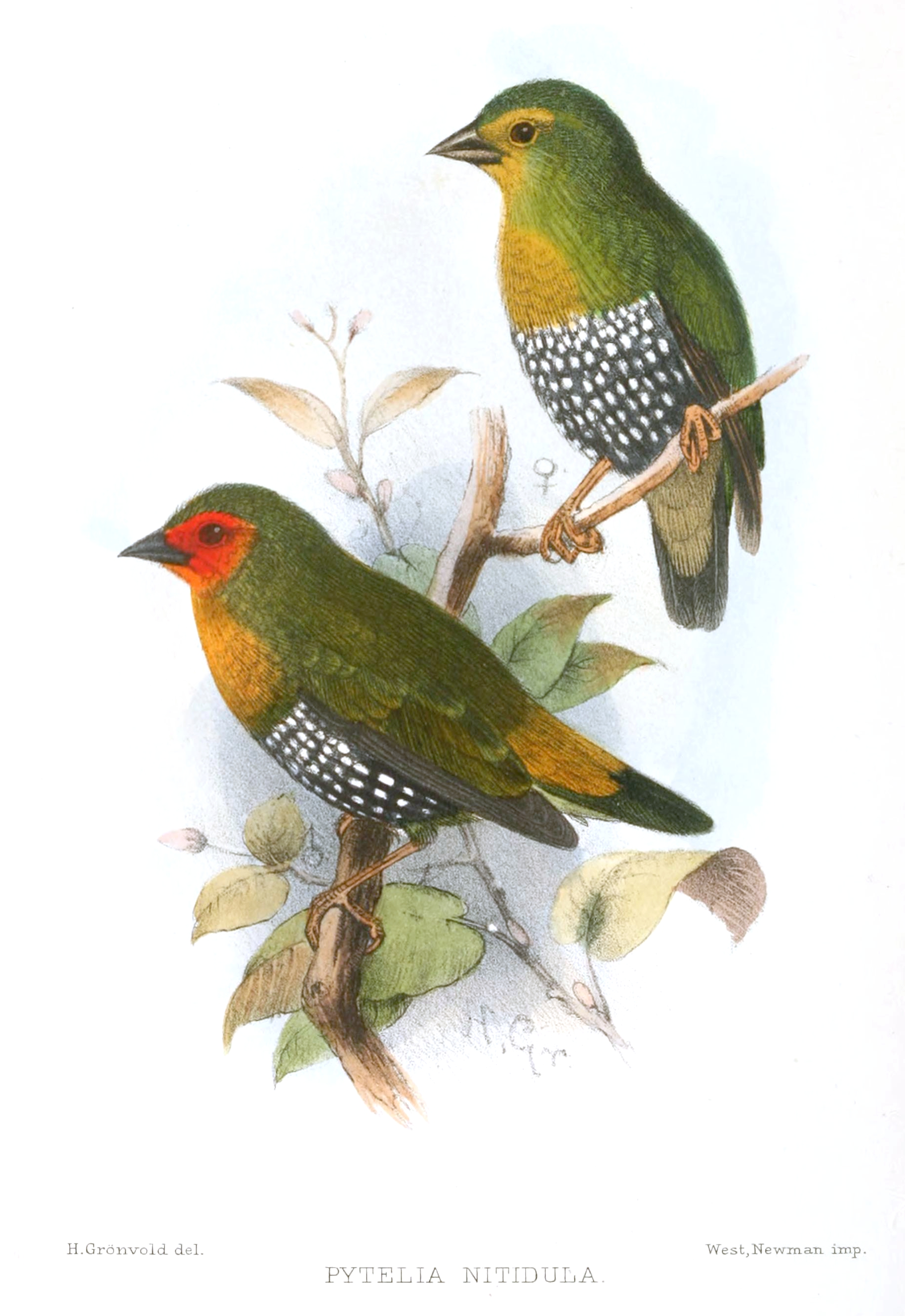

Conservation status
- Least Concern (IUCN 3.1)

Scientific classification
- Kingdom: Animalia
- Phylum: Chordata
- Class: Aves
- Order: Passeriformes
- Family: Estrildidae
- Genus: Mandingoa; Hartert, 1919
- Species: M. nitidula

Binomial name
- Mandingoa nitidula (Hartlaub, 1865)

= Green-backed twinspot =

Species of bird

The green-backed twinspot or green twinspot (Mandingoa nitidula) is an estrildid finch found in many parts of Sub-Saharan Africa. The IUCN has classified the species as being of least concern.

== Subspecies ==
The green-backed twinspot has four sub-species:

- Mandingoa nitidula chubbi
- Mandingoa nitidula nitidula
- Mandingoa nitidula schlegeli
- Mandingoa nitidula virginiae

== Habitat ==
The green-backed twinspot inhabits lowland moist forests of the tropical region. It may also be found in grassland and shrubland habitats.

Males are distinguished from females by their bright red facial feathers. Females have an olive-green face and darker (almost black) beak.

== Aviculture ==
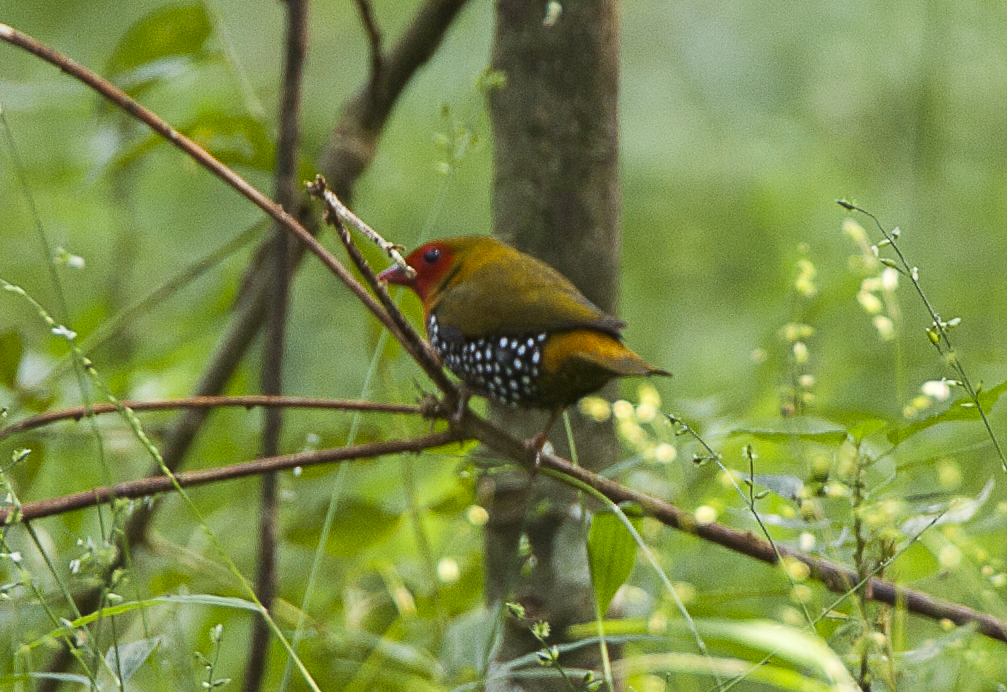
Green-backed twinspot in Budongo Forest, Uganda

The green backed twinspot prefers its privacy in regards to breeding. Males in the breeding season will raise their heads, looking straight up while "dancing" on the perch next to the female, moving in a side-stepping fashion. The female, if receptive, will crouch down and point her tail to the male. Green backed twinspots tend to pair with one female and care for her and the young while breeding. Up to four eggs are laid about five days after mating, usually one daily. The female will go in and out of the nest frequently until all eggs are laid and will sit in place to incubate thereafter, ensuring all hatch in relatively close proximity.

This species enjoys a large, planted aviary with plenty of privacy for breeding. Temperatures in captivity should not dip below 70 °F or exceed 84 °F. Green back twinspots may be housed as single pairs, singles, or in groups up to four pairs in a large flight.

The birds eat millet, dark leafy greens, fresh bananas, cooked brown rice and mixed finch seed.
