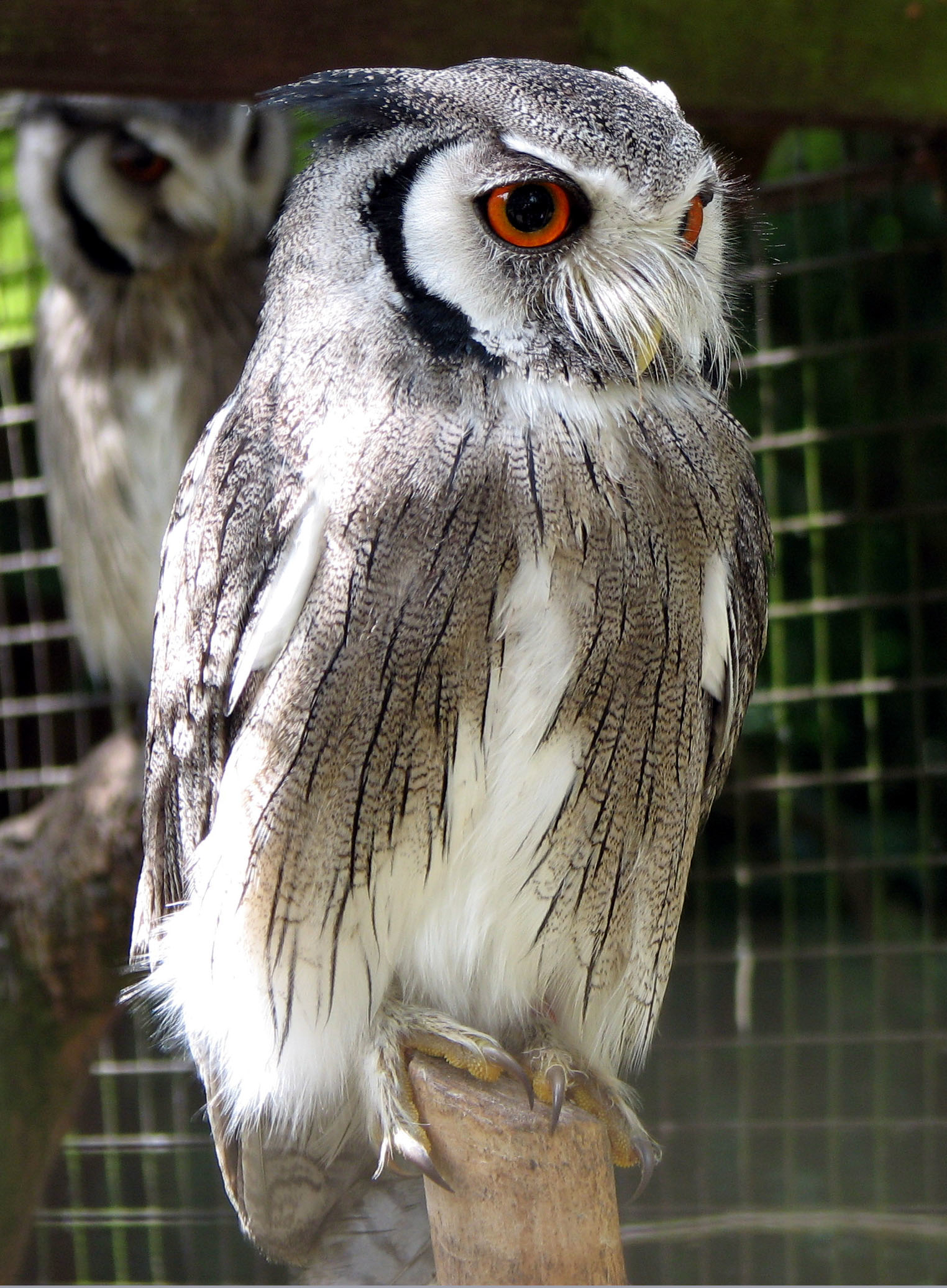
- Northern white-faced owl

Scientific classification
- Kingdom: Animalia
- Phylum: Chordata
- Class: Aves
- Order: Strigiformes
- Family: Strigidae
- Genus: Ptilopsis; Kaup, 1848

Type species
- Strix leucotis Temminck, 1820

Species
- P. leucotis P. granti

= Ptilopsis =

Genus of birds

Ptilopsis is a genus of typical owls, or true owls, in the family Strigidae, that inhabits Africa. Its members are:

Genus Ptilopsis – Kaup, 1848 – two species
Common name	Scientific name and subspecies	Range	Size and ecology	IUCN status and estimated population
Northern white-faced owl	Ptilopsis leucotis (Temminck, 1820)	Benin, Burkina Faso, Cameroon, Central African Republic, Chad, Republic of the Congo, Ivory Coast, Djibouti, Eritrea, Ethiopia, Gambia, Ghana, Guinea, Guinea-Bissau, Kenya, Liberia, Mali, Mauritania, Niger, Nigeria, Senegal, Sierra Leone, Somalia, Sudan, Togo and Uganda.	Size: Habitat: Diet:	LC
Southern white-faced owl	Ptilopsis granti (Kollibay, 1910)	southern half of Africa	Size: Habitat: Diet:	LC
