= Rosefin barb =

Conservation status
- Least Concern (IUCN 3.1)

Scientific classification
- Domain: Eukaryota
- Kingdom: Animalia
- Phylum: Chordata
- Class: Actinopterygii
- Order: Cypriniformes
- Family: Cyprinidae
- Subfamily: Smiliogastrinae
- Genus: Enteromius
- Species: E. argenteus

Binomial name
- Enteromius argenteus Günther, 1868

Synonyms
- Barbus argenteus Günther, 1868; Puntius argenteus (Günther, 1868); Barbus crocodilensis Fowler, 1934

Species of fish

Rosefin barb (Enteromius argenteus) is a species of cyprinid fish in the genus Enteromius from rivers in Angola and Namibia.
