= Panorama Route =

Road in South Africa

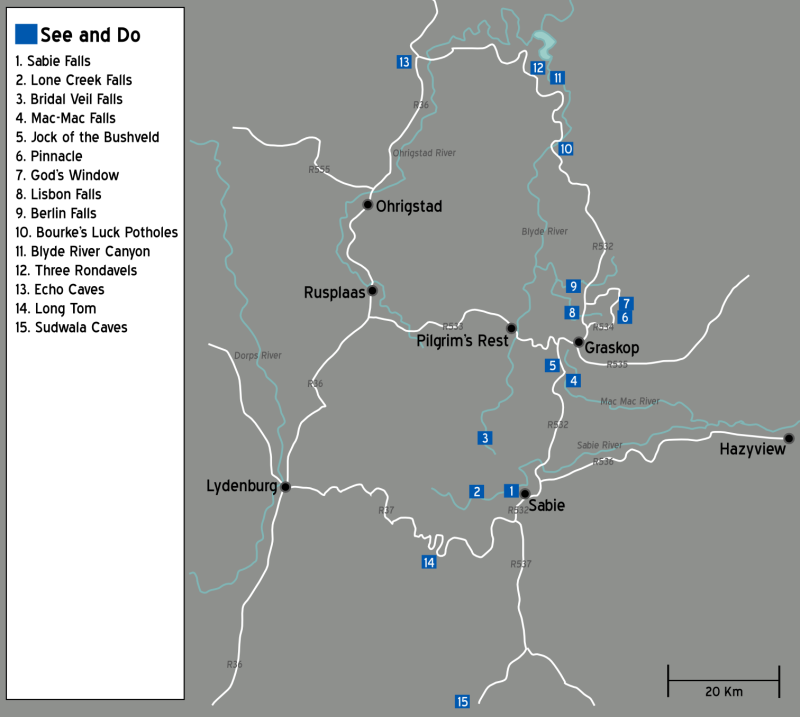
Points of interest along the Panorama Route

The Panorama Route is a scenic road in South Africa connecting several cultural and natural points of interest. The route, steeped in the history of South Africa, is in Mpumalanga province, centred around the Blyde River Canyon, the world's third largest canyon. It features numerous waterfalls, one of the largest afforested areas in South Africa, and several natural landmarks. The route starts at the foot of the Long Tom Pass just outside Lydenburg, following the natural descent from the Great Escarpment to the Lowveld, and ending at the border of the Mpumalanga and Limpopo provinces near the Echo Caves.

== History ==
This route is deeply entrenched in the history of South Africa. From 1871, parts of the route were used as a transport road between Lydenburg and Delagoa Bay. It is also on this route that General Louis Botha fled from the English during the Anglo–Boer War, and houses one of the most famous Victorian-age canons in the world, the Long Tom.

Many towns on the route, such as Pilgrim's Rest, were established during the Transvaal gold rush in the late 1800s. Thousands of fortune seekers crossed the treacherous mountains and rugged terrain in search of gold. One of these was a former storekeeper from Pilgrim's Rest, Percy Fitzpatrick. He wrote the popular book Jock of the Bushveld, recounting some of the adventures he shared with his faithful Bull Terrier Jock, whilst traversing this famous route.

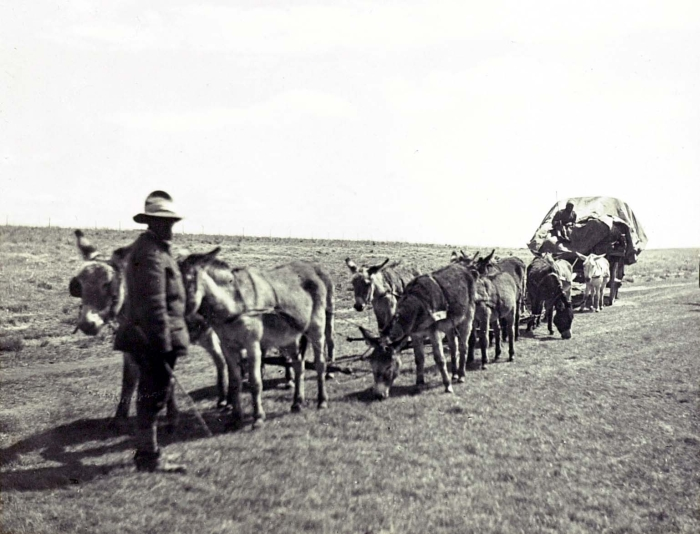
Wagons on the transport route of the Lowveld

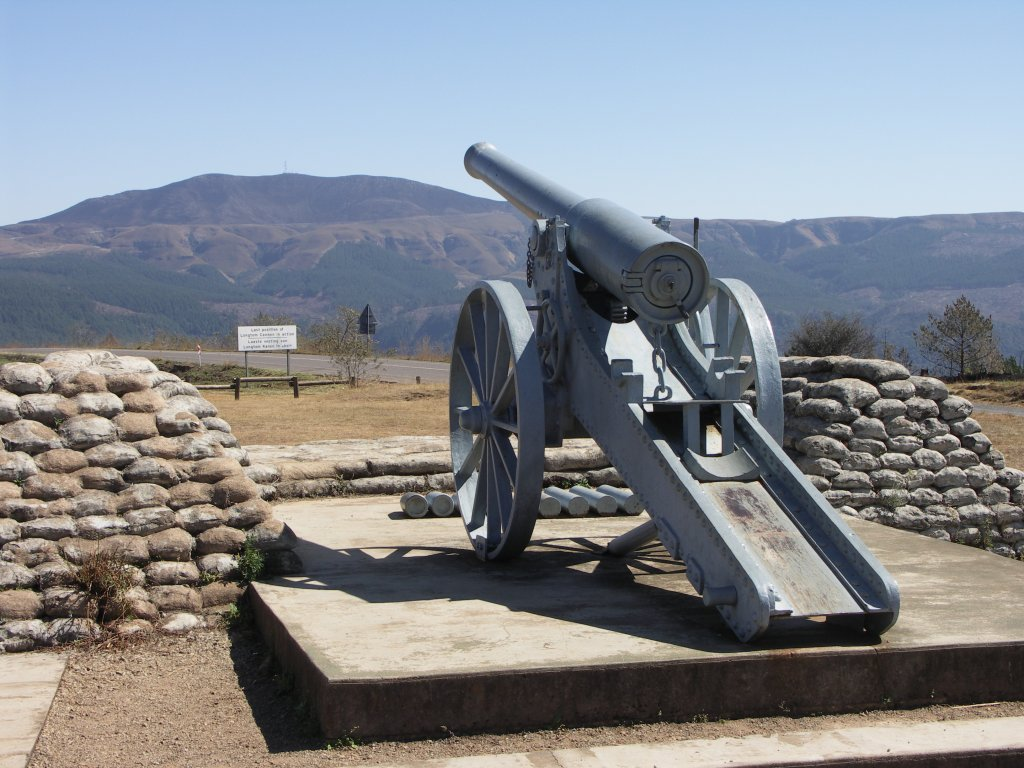
The Long Tom cannon used by the Boers

== Route ==
From	To	Road codes	Distance
Lydenburg	Sabie	R37	58 kilometres (36 mi)
Sabie	Graskop	R532	30 kilometres (19 mi)
Graskop	Pilgrim's Rest	R532/R533	16 kilometres (9.9 mi)
Pilgrim's Rest	Kiepersol	R533/R535	68 kilometres (42 mi)
Kiepersol	Hazyview	R533/R535	16 kilometres (9.9 mi)
Hazyview	Ohrigstad	R532/R36	198 kilometres (123 mi)

=== Towns ===
==== Lydenburg ====
This historic town was founded in 1850 by Voortrekker leader Andries Potgieter. For a brief period it served as the capital of the Zuid-Afrikaansche Republiek.

Long before this, a mysterious civilization occupied the region. The Lydenburg Heads are hollow terracotta sculptures dating back to 500AD. These sculptures are believed to have been used in religious ceremonies by these people. The Lydenburg Museum showcases some of these finds.

Alluvial gold was discovered in 1873, and the town experienced a brief gold rush. The town also featured prominently on the route from the Transvaal Republic to Delagoa Bay. Today Lydenburg is known for farming, trout fishing and mining. The Panorama Route starts just outside Lydenburg at the foot of the Long Tom Pass.

==== Sabie ====
Sabie is known as a forestry and tourist town. The town was inhabited by the Sesotho in the early 1800s. Europeans settled in Sabie from 1873, when gold was discovered in the area. Since it is a high-altitude town, it was used as a base for early big game hunters, as it was malaria free. The river (also known as the Sabie river) often flooded and was infested with crocodiles; hence the local people called it uluSaba – the river of fear.

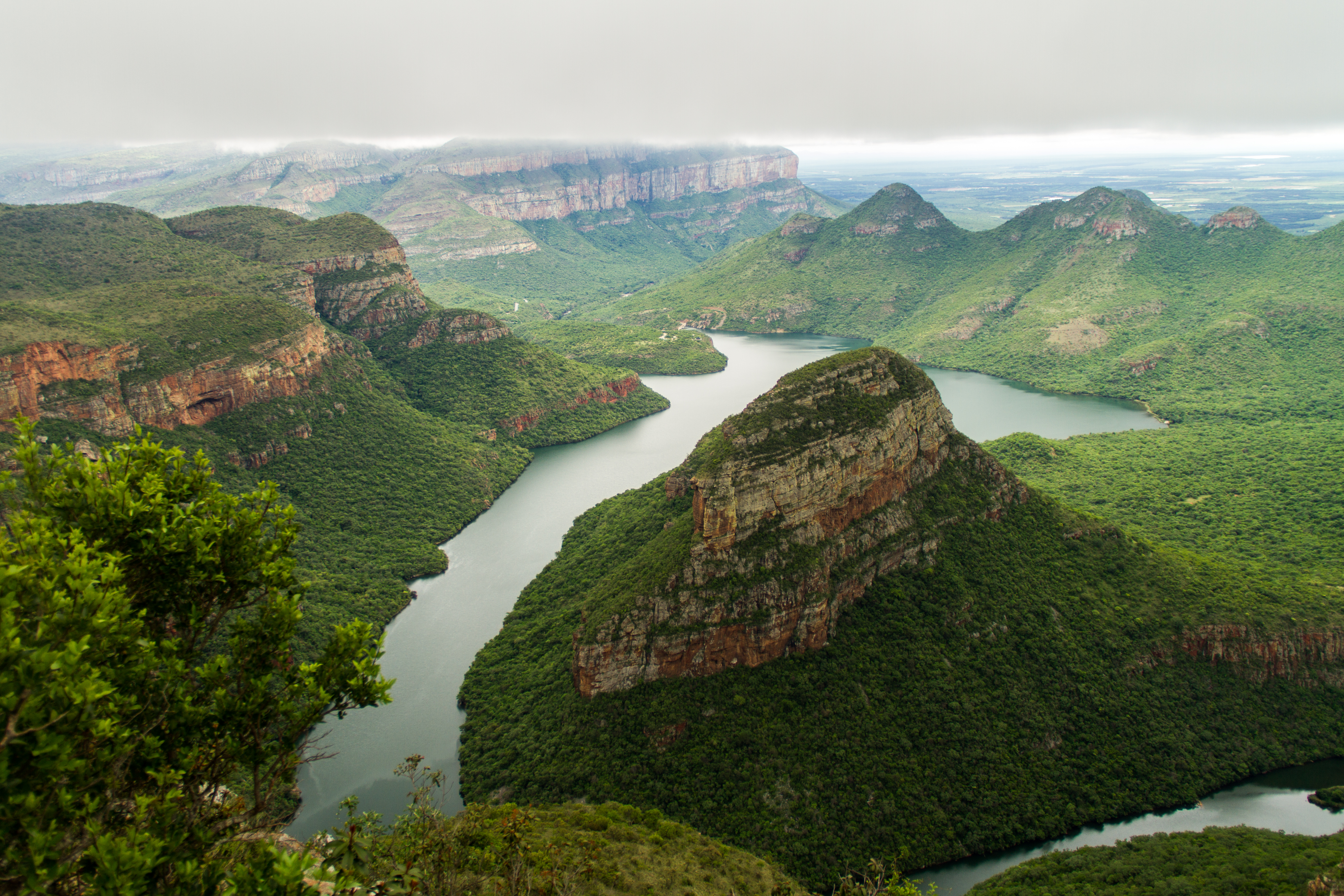
Blyde River Canyon

The natural forests were cleared to supply wood for the mining industry. Through the foresight of Joseph Brook Shires, commercial trees were planted in 1876, leading to Sabie being surrounded by one of the largest man-made forests in the world today.

==== Graskop ====
Graskop's history can be traced back to 1837 when the Voortrekker leader Andries Pretorius and his followers were looking for greener pastures. He wrote in his memoirs of leaving women behind in Graskop (translated as "grassy hill") whilst looking for an ox wagon route to Delagoa Bay.

Today Graskop mainly serves as a tourist town in close proximity to many natural landmarks such as God's Window and Bourke's Luck Potholes.

==== Pilgrim's Rest ====
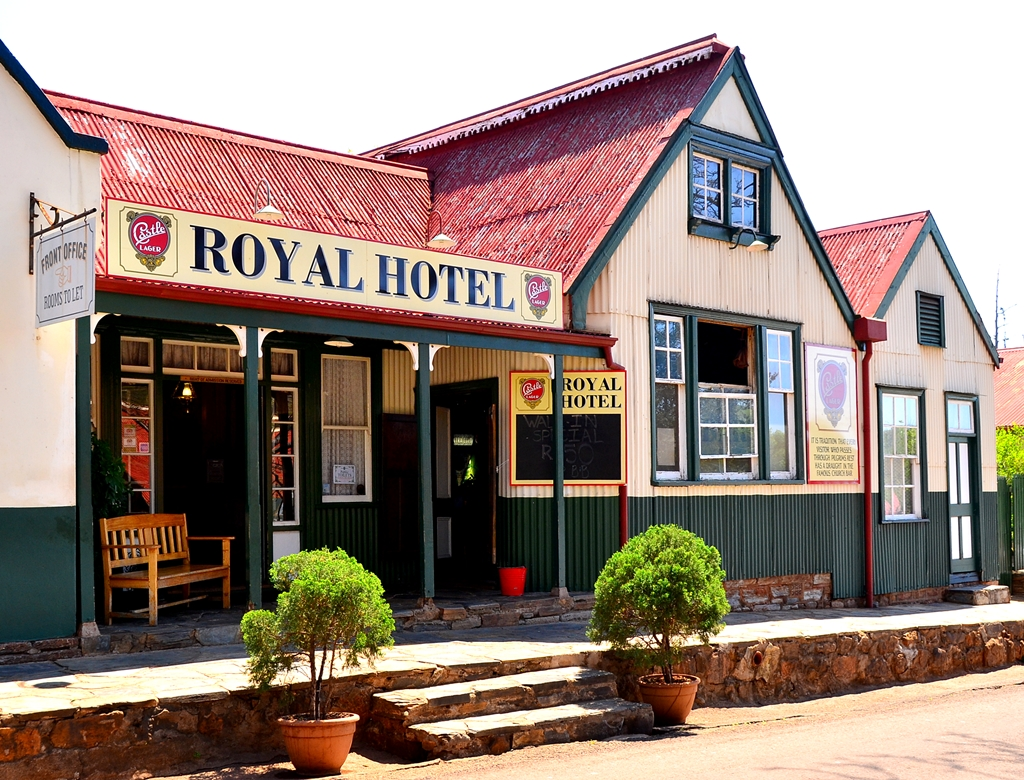
The Royal Hotel, Pilgrim's Rest

Pilgrim's Rest is approximately 35 km north of Sabie. The whole town has been classified as a national monument. It is a restored gold-mining town with several curio shops and Victorian buildings. Its history can be traced back to 1873 when Alex Patterson discovered alluvial gold. It soon became known as a fortune seeker's town, with close to 1500 "diggers" joining Patterson within a year. Later a mine, Transvaal Gold Mining Estates, was established as the first listed gold mining company in South Africa. National Gold Panning Championships are held annually in the village and visitors can also book a panning experience.

==== Hazyview ====
Hazyview is a town situated close to the Kruger National Park. The town is frequented by visitors due to the fact that it is the gateway to the Phabeni Gate of the Kruger National Park. Hazyview is renowned for its various animal sanctuaries, including a world-famous elephant sanctuary.

Legend has it that a French-Canadian, only known as Perry, settled in the area whilst fleeing from an alleged murder charge. He started a trading store, but after his death the farm was sold, and one of the first private game reserves in South Africa was proclaimed on the land.

The economy of this town is driven by tourism, agriculture (specifically banana farming), and retail.

==== Ohrigstad ====
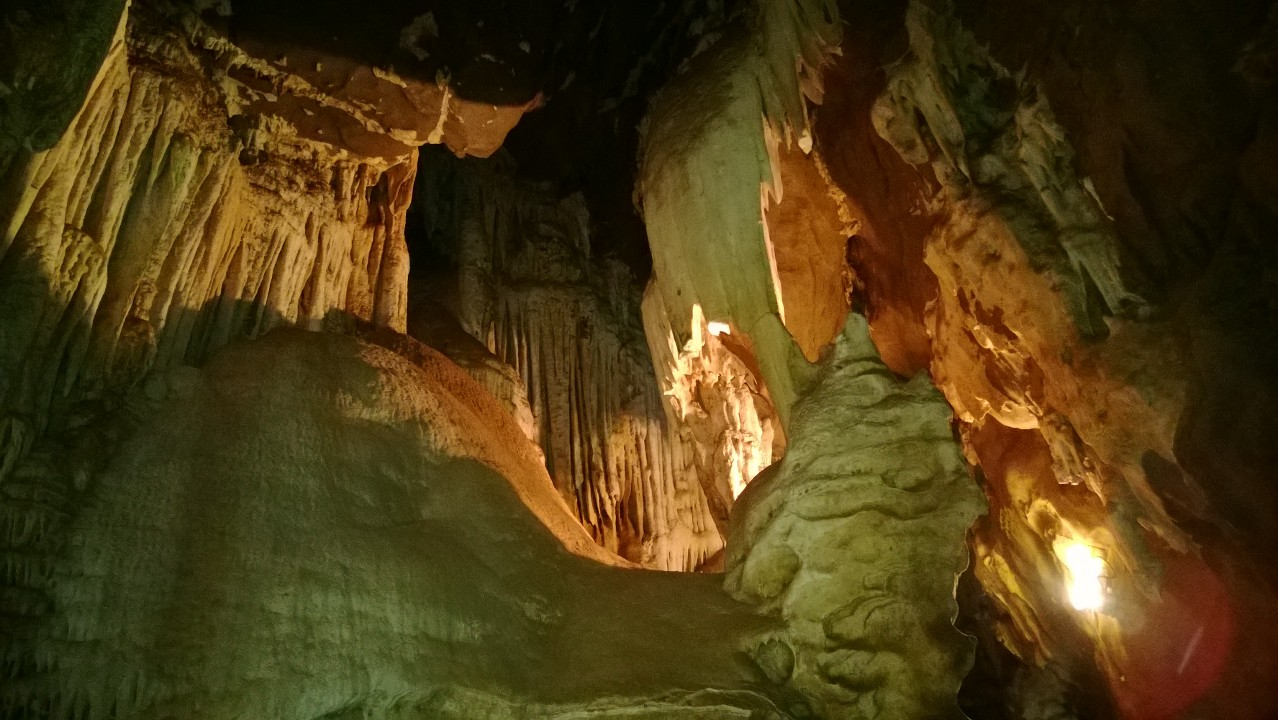
A view of the Echo Caves

Ohrigstad is a small town on the border of Mpumalanga and the Limpopo province. The town was established by Voortrekkers in 1845, and is named after Voortrekker leader Andries Hendrik Potgieter, and G. G. Ohrig, an Amsterdam trader who wanted to cultivate trade between the Netherlands and the Zuid-Afrikaansche Republiek.

The town is now home to some game farms and commercial agriculture. The famous Echo Caves are situated about 28 km north of the town. These caves were discovered in 1923 when the owner of the farm Klipfonteinhoek observed his cattle disappear into the cave, drawn to the fresh, cold water.

==== Kiepersol ====
Kiepersol is a small village close to Hazyview. It is predominantly an agricultural community with large banana plantations, as well as other fruit-farming activities

== Points of interest ==
=== Waterfalls ===
There are several waterfalls on the route. Most of these waterfalls fall under the jurisdiction of the provincial parks boards. They are open to the public, and many are associated with hiking trails.

Name of falls	River	Nearest town	Height of falls
Berlin Falls	Lisbon River	Graskop	80 metres (260 ft)
Bridal Veil Falls	Sabie River	Sabie	146 metres (479 ft)
Lisbon Falls	Lisbon River	Graskop	92 metres (302 ft)
Lone Creek Falls	Sabie River	Sabie	68 metres (223 ft)
Mac-Mac Falls	Mac-Mac River	Graskop	65 metres (213 ft)
Sabie Falls	Sabie River	Sabie	35 metres (115 ft)

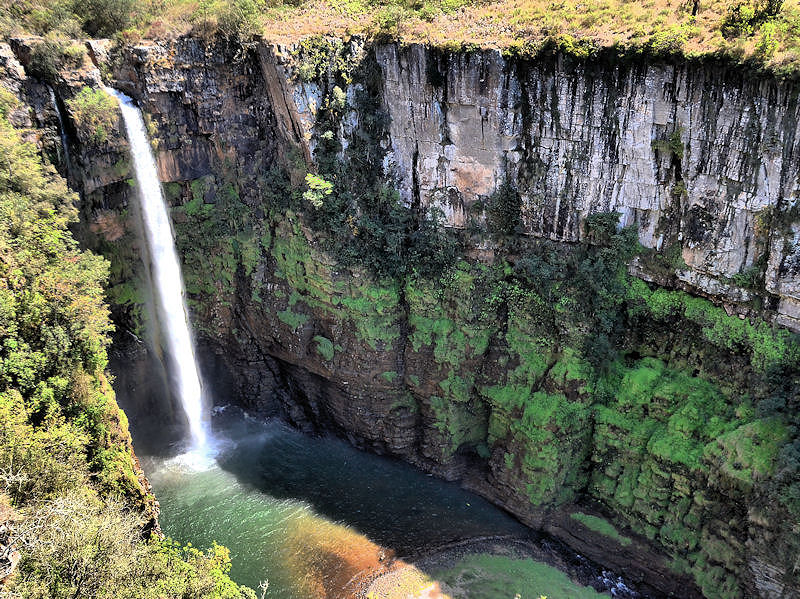
The Mac Mac Falls

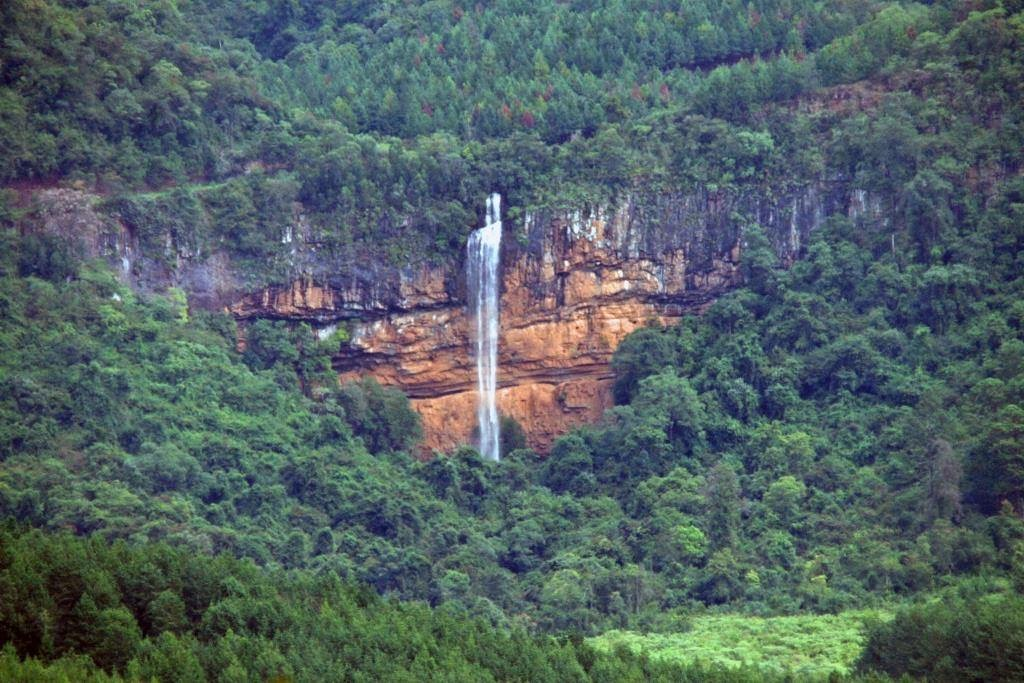
Bridal Veil Falls

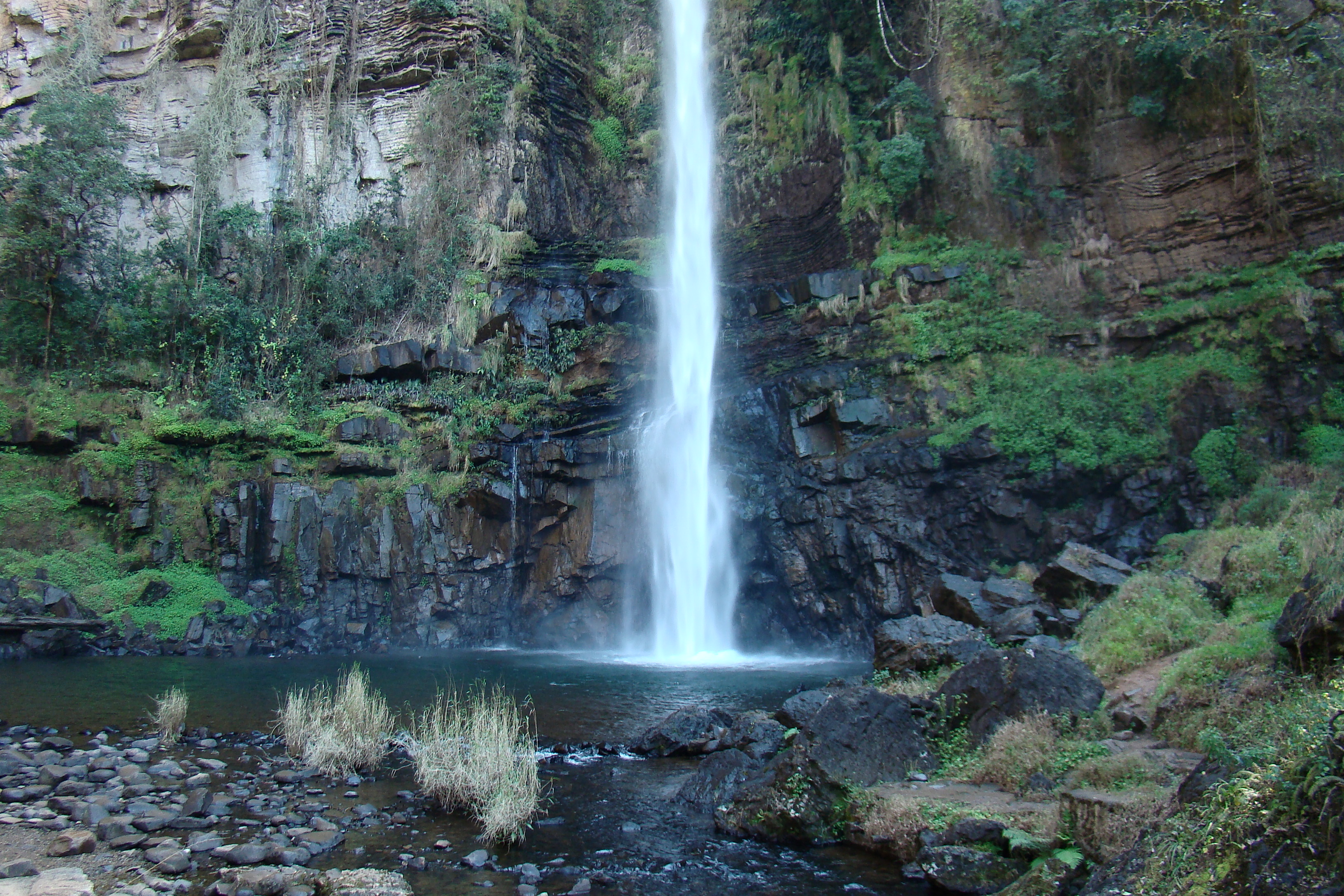
Lone Creek Falls

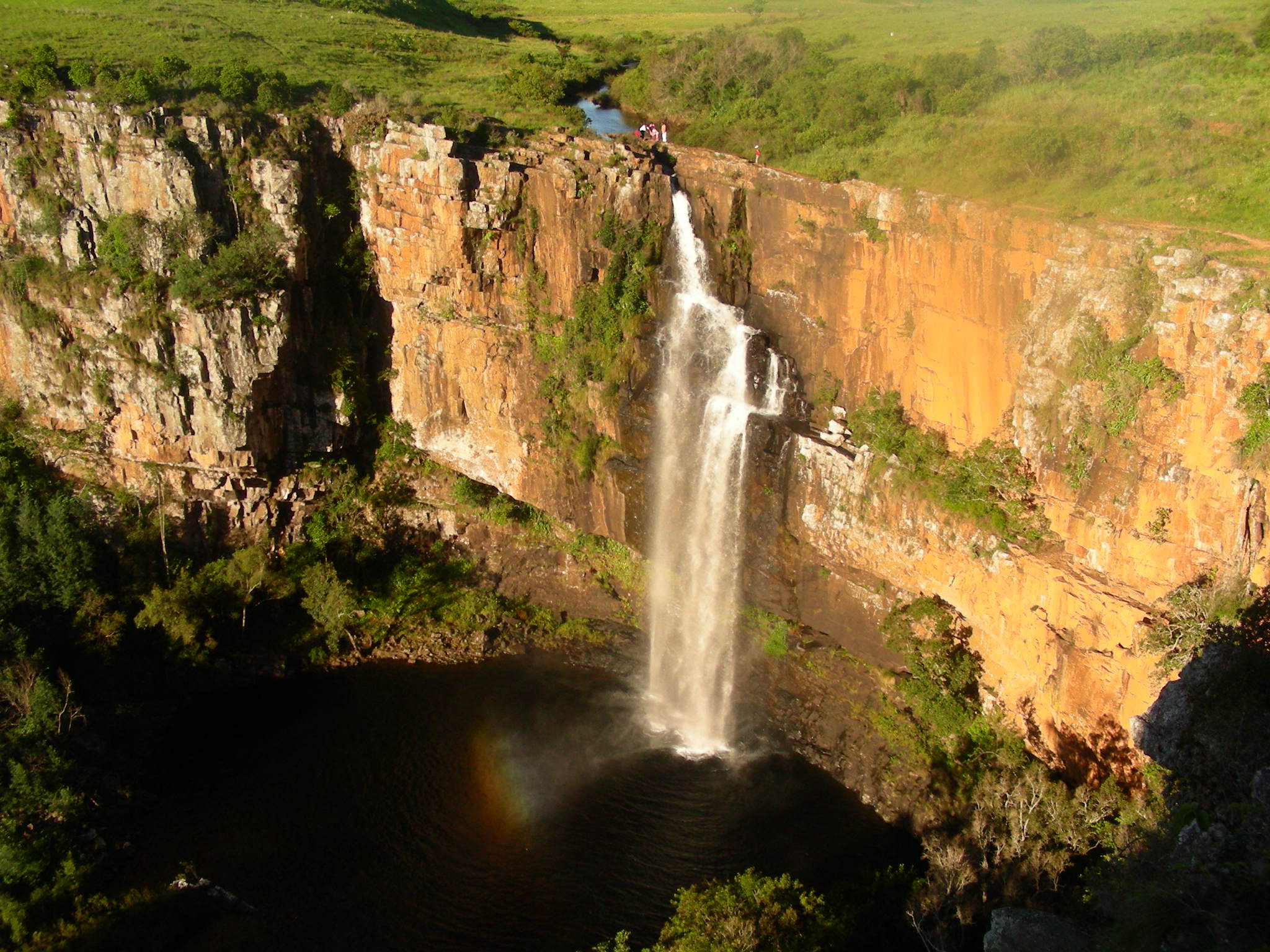
Berlin Falls

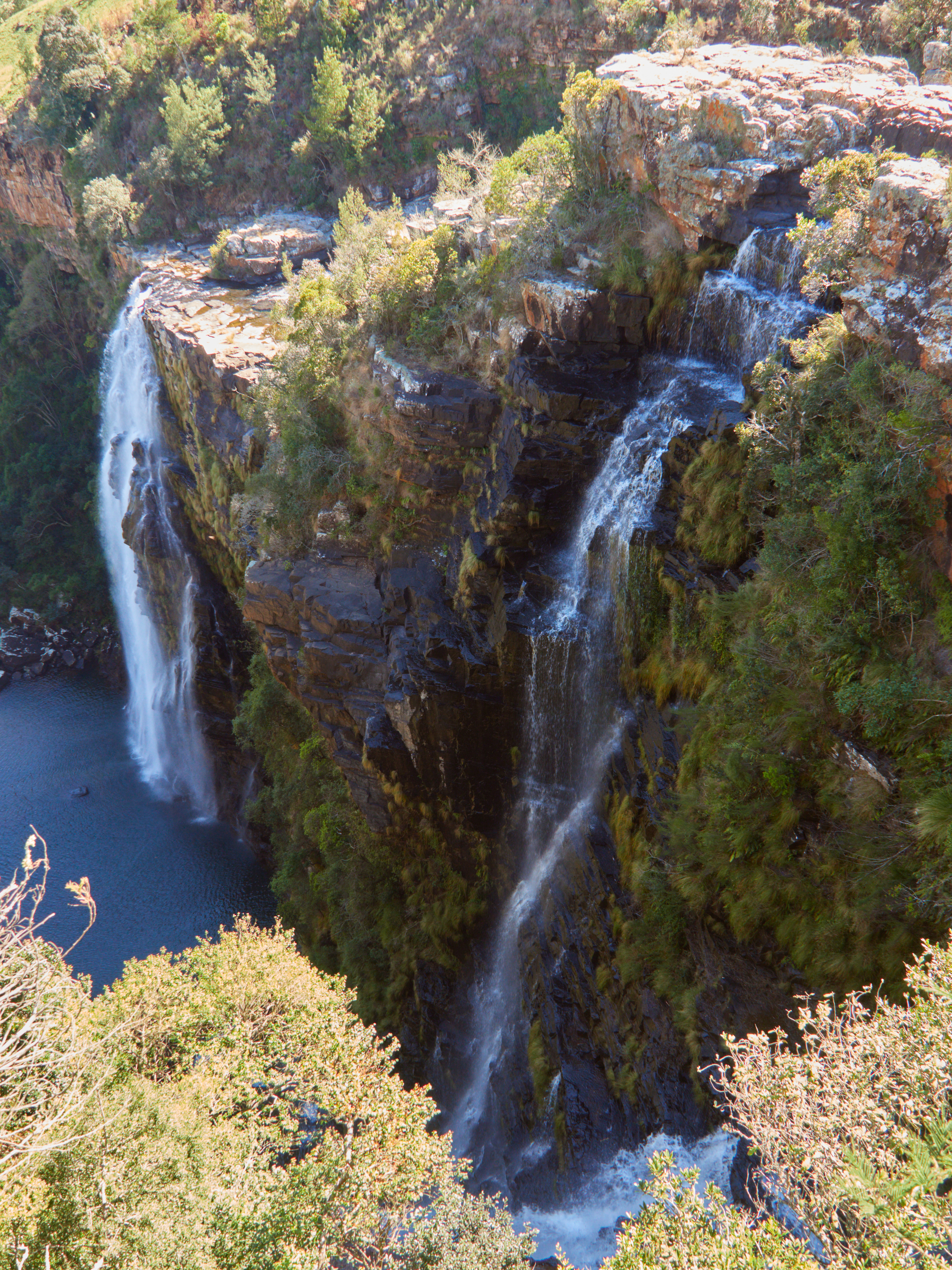
Lisbon Falls

=== Mountain passes ===
The Panorama Route is home to several scenic mountain passes.

Name of mountain pass	Connecting towns	Length	Elevation of summit
Bergvliet Pass	Sabie-Hazyview	9 kilometres (5.6 mi)	997 metres (3,271 ft)
Blyderiver Poort Pass	Graskop-Ohrigstad	23 kilometres (14 mi)	1,379 metres (4,524 ft)
Bonnet Pass	Graskop-Pilgrim's Rest	5 kilometres (3.1 mi)	1,667 metres (5,469 ft)
Kiepersol Pass	Sabie-Kiepersol	5 kilometres (3.1 mi)	912 metres (2,992 ft)
Koffiehoogte	Lydenburg-Sabie	6 kilometres (3.7 mi)	1,672 metres (5,486 ft)
Long Tom Pass	Lydenburg-Sabie	22 kilometres (14 mi)	2,138 metres (7,014 ft)
Masjiennek	Lydenburg-Sabie	11 kilometres (6.8 mi)	2,090 metres (6,860 ft)
Robber's Pass	Pilgrim's Rest-Ohrigstad	26 kilometres (16 mi)	1,789 metres (5,869 ft)
Sudwala Pass	Lydenburg-Sudwala Caves	9 kilometres (5.6 mi)	1,223 metres (4,012 ft)

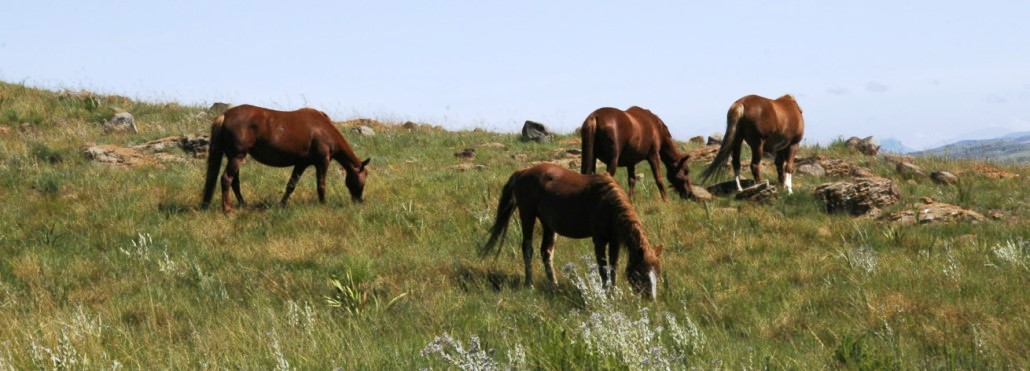
Wild horses on Paardeplaats, Masjiennek Pass

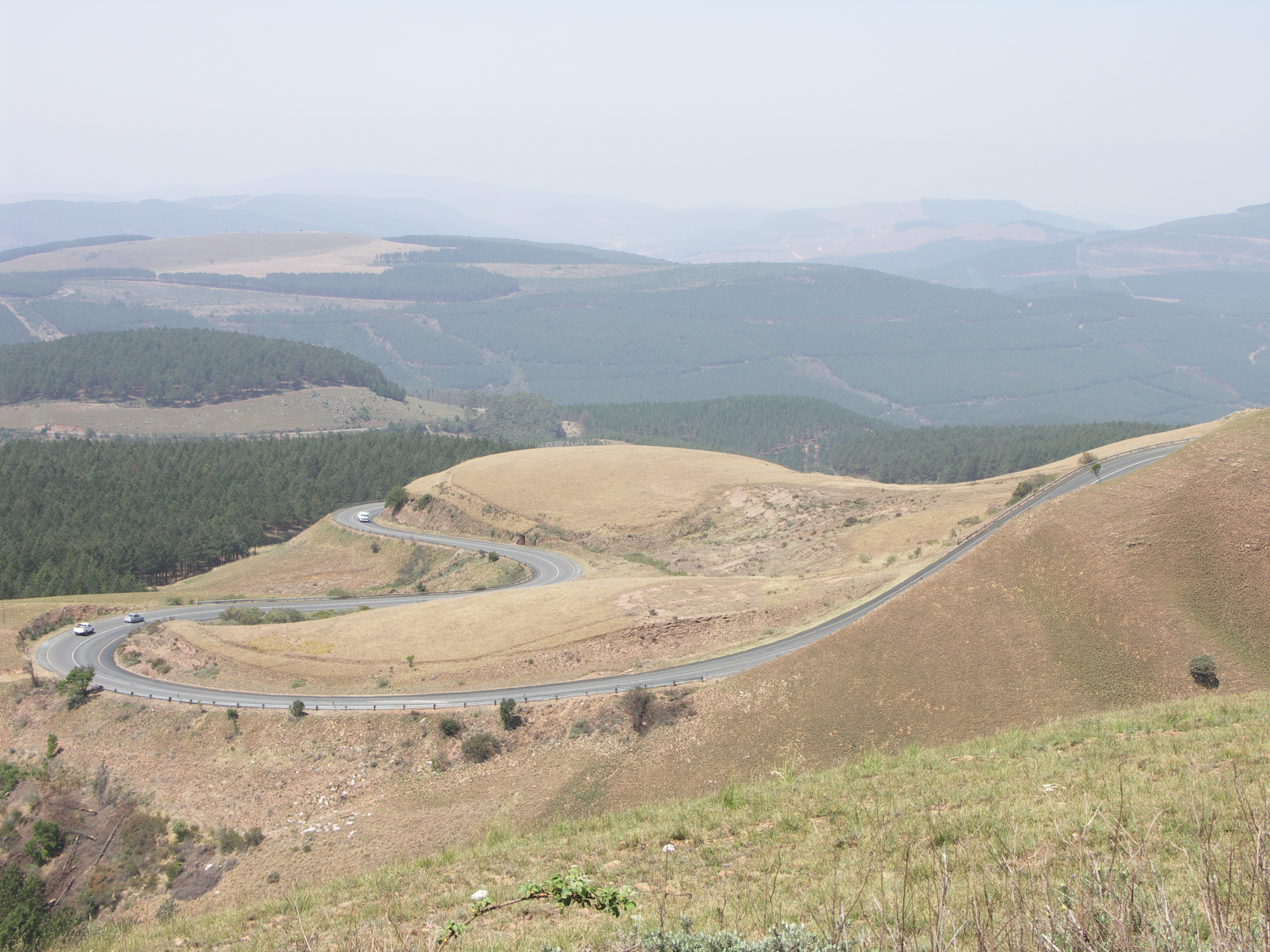
The curves of the Long Tom Pass

=== Historical and cultural sites ===
Due to the rich history of the area, the Panorama Route is home to several important cultural and historical sites. These include the following:

- Shangana Cultural Village – a traditional village that celebrates the Shangana people
- Lydenburg Museum – This museum showcases exhibits of early human settlers in the area, the most famous of which is the Lydenburg Heads. It also gives visitors a view of the ethnographic history of the Pedi people.
- Joubert Bridge – one of the oldest bridges in the area. It was built to cross the Blyde River and provide a passage between Pilgrim's Rest and Lydenburg. Italian engineer, Giovan B Gilletti was commissioned and the bridge was officially opened in 1897 by Jacobus Stephanus Joubert, the mining commissioner of Pilgrim's Rest. The bridge was named after him, and can still be used today.

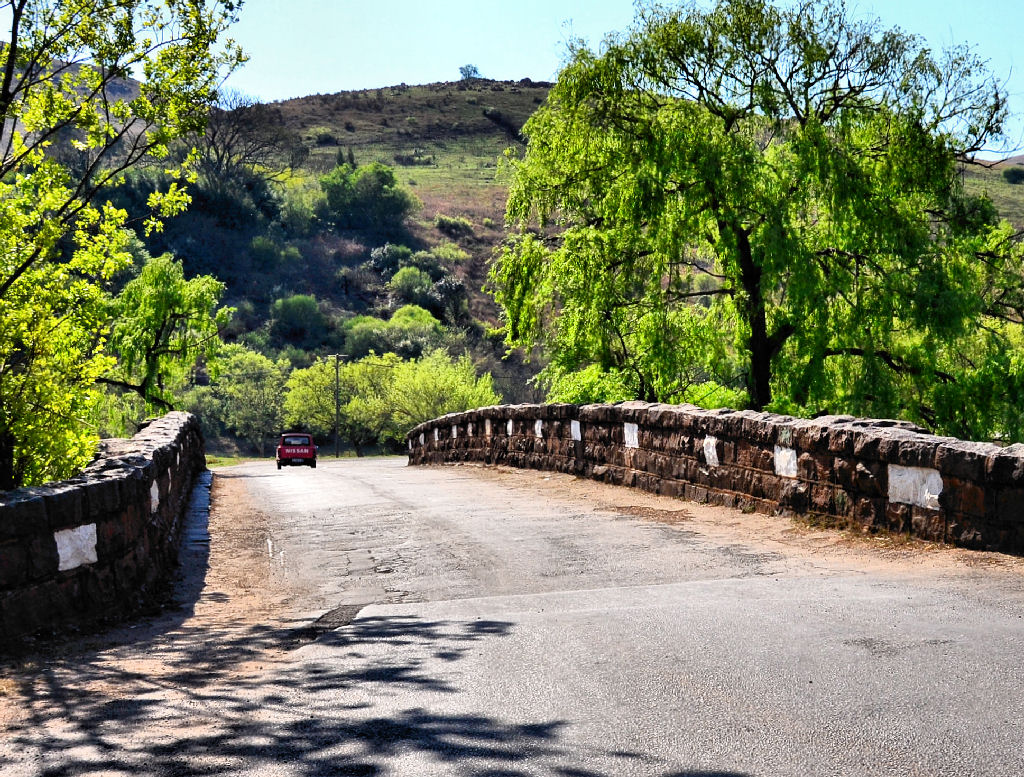
The Joubert Bridge crossing the Blyde River

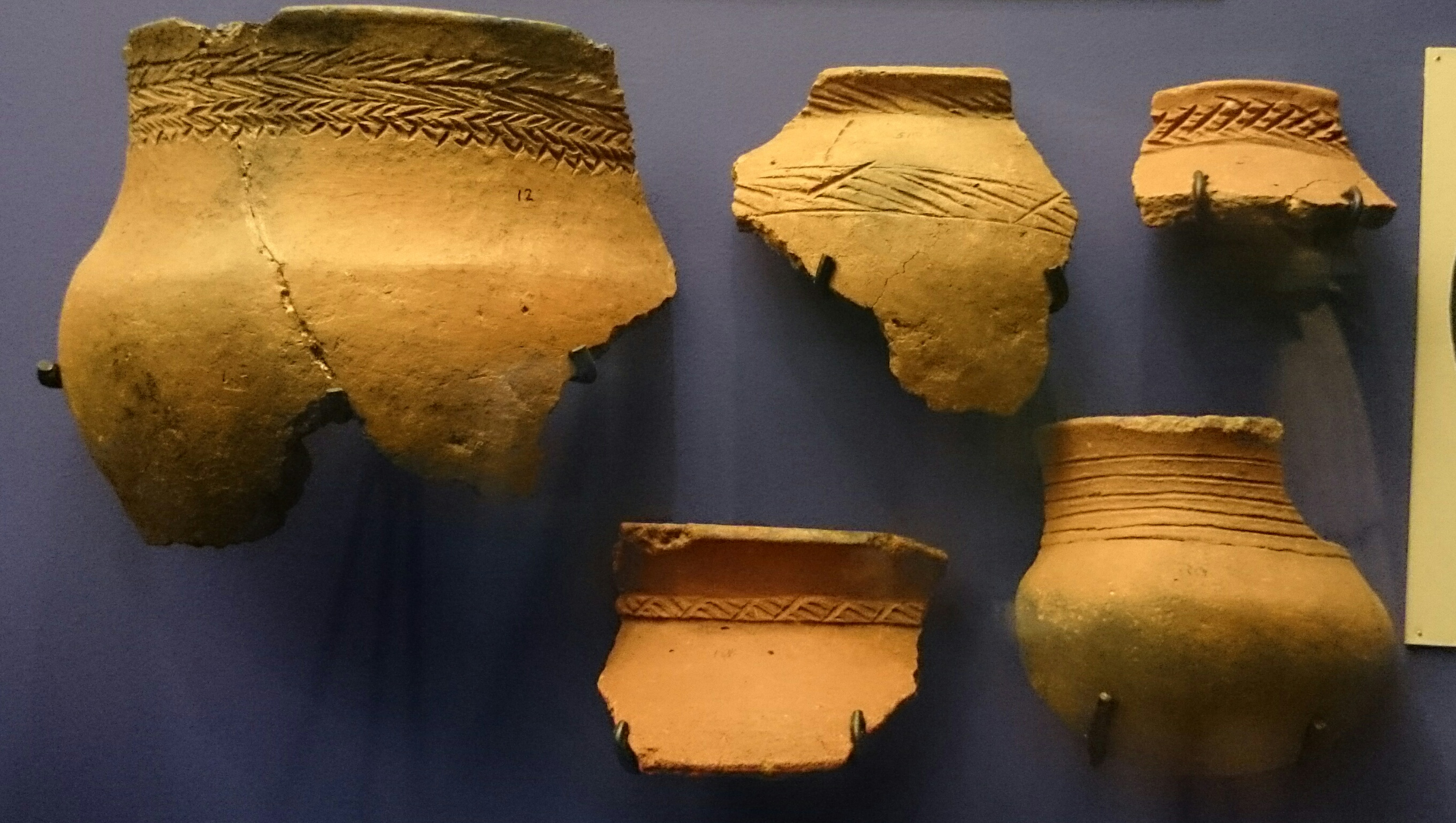
Some ancient pottery fragments on display at the Lydenburg Museum

=== Landmarks ===
The Mpumalanga area is rich in natural phenomena, and the majority of these can be found on the Panorama Route.

- God's Window – This is a vantage point on the Drakensberg escarpment. The cliffs drop 700m from the vantage point. Frequented by tourists, on a clear day one can see up until the Mozambican border.
- Bourke's Luck Potholes – Bourke's Luck Potholes are a series of natural geological formations that were formed by centuries of water flowing through the landscape. The potholes occur where the Treur River joins the Blyde River at the start of the Blyde River Canyon. In a continuous manner, the force of the water in these two rivers, combined with the particles of sand and rock that the rivers transport wears cylindrical potholes into the sandstone bedrock.
- Three Rondavels – This phenomenon is named after small, grass huts called rondavels due to its remarkable resemblance. The shapes are due to erosion of softer limestone, leaving harder quartzite behind. The Bapedi knew these formations as the Chief and his three wives. The flat-topped peak was named Mapjaneng ('the chief') after a legendary Bapedi chief, Maripi Mashile, who defeated invading Swazis in a great battle near here. The three peaks are named after his three wives – Magabolie, Mogoladikwe, and Maseroto.
- Echo Caves – The name Echo was given to the cave, as a certain stalactite formation produces a distinctive echoing sound when tapped on. This echo can still be heard on the outside of the cave today.
- Blyde River Canyon – It is part of the 29 000ha Blyde River Canyon Nature Reserve is carved out of nearly 2,5 km of red sandstone. Also known as the Motlatse Canyon, it is the third largest canyon on Earth and is situated below the confluence of the Blyde ('joy') and Treur ('sorrow') rivers. The 29 000ha Blyde River Canyon Nature Reserve is carved out of nearly 2,5 km of red sandstone and is one of South Africa's most remarkable geological features. Also known as the Motlatse Canyon, it is the third largest canyon on Earth and is situated below the confluence of the Blyde ('joy') and Treur ('sorrow') rivers.
- The Pinnacle – A large quartzite column rising from a deep gorge.
- Sudwala Caves – Sudwala Caves are known as the oldest caves in the world. Although the caves were formed over a period of some 3 000-million years, they have only been accessible to the public since the 1960s. The caves were used as shelter by prehistoric man in the form of Homo habilis, a predecessor of Homo erectus, approximately 1,8 million years ago. The caves play an important role in the history of the Swazi people, being used as a fortress by Somquba during a power struggle for the Swazi throne.

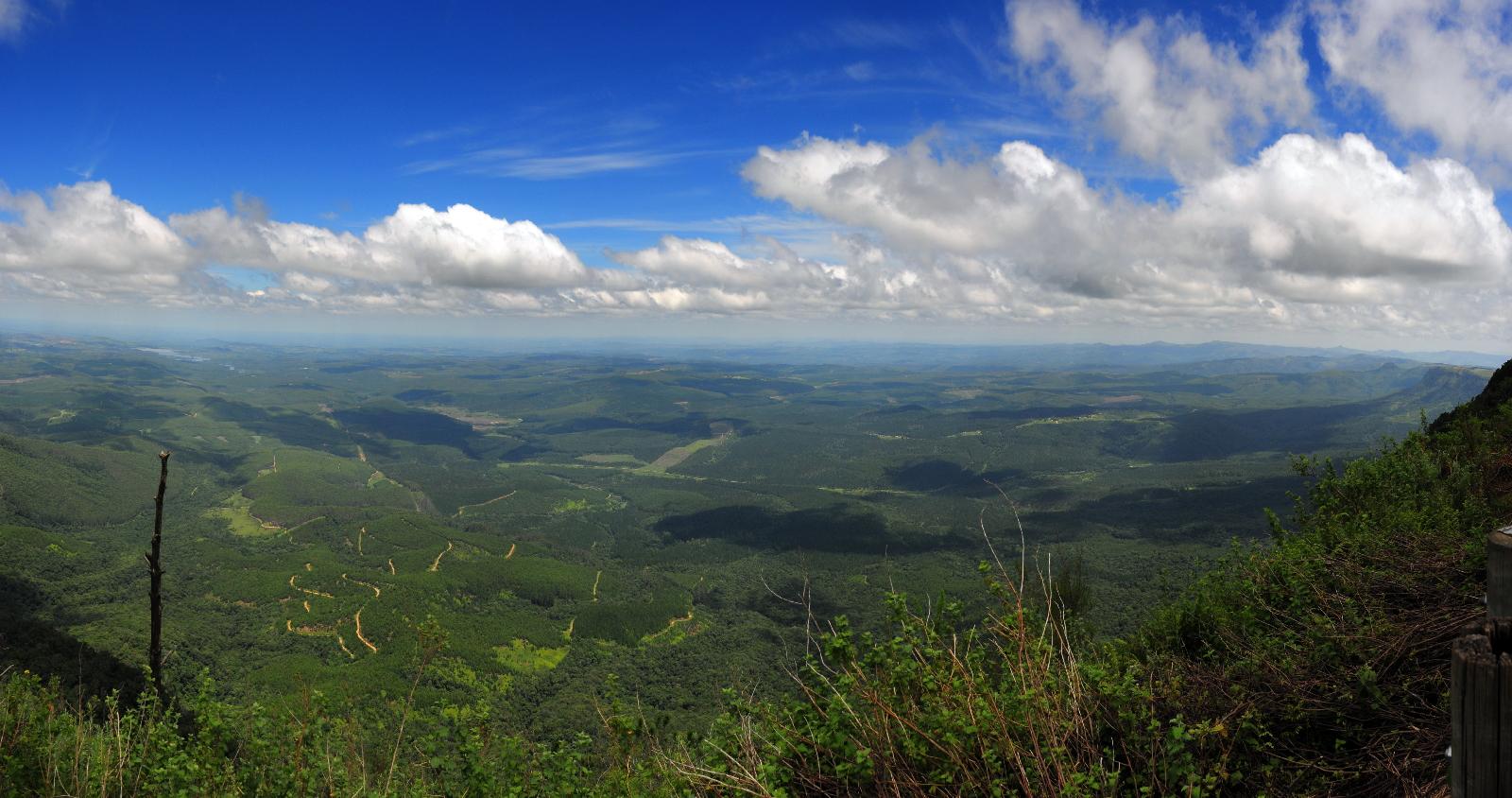
The view of the Lowveld from God's Window

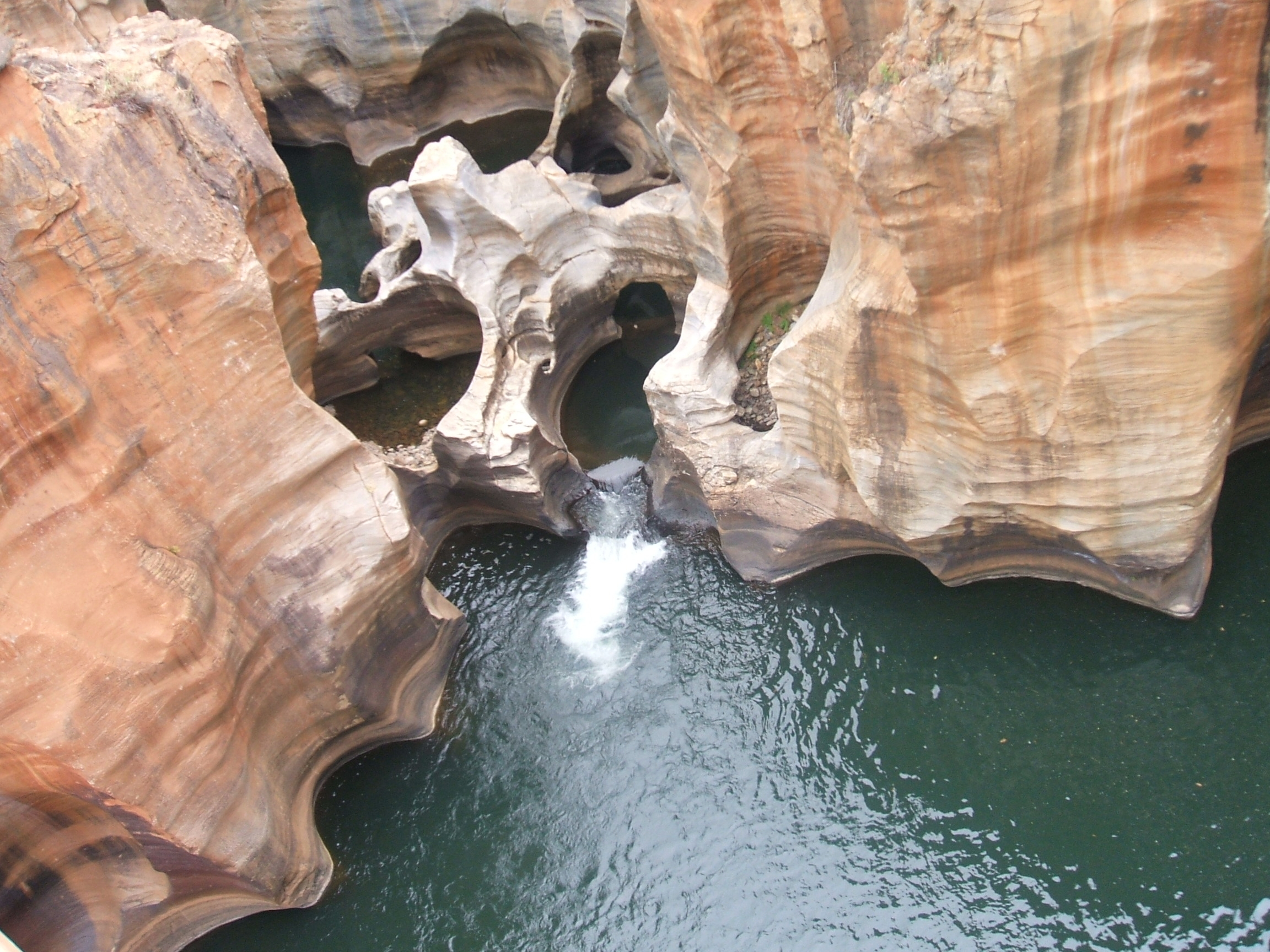
Bourke's Luck Potholes

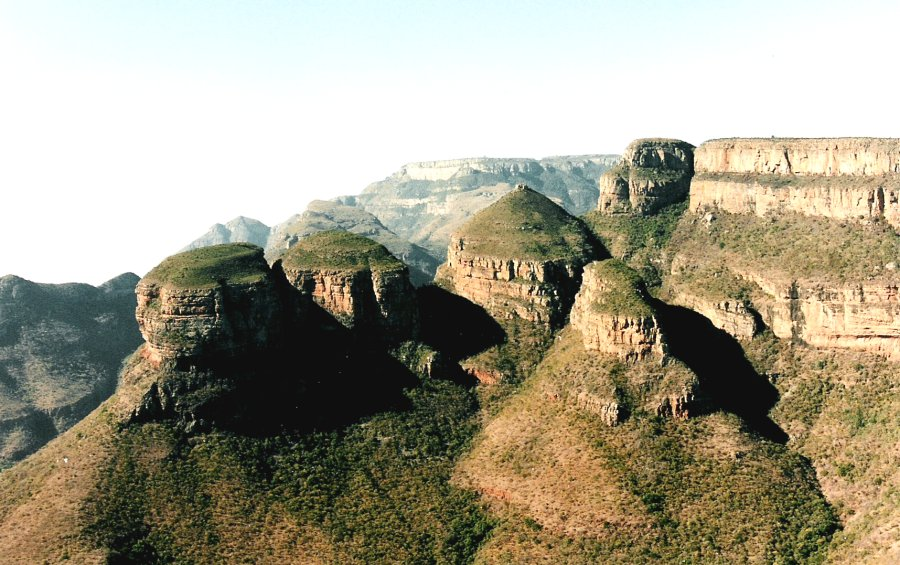
The Three Rondavels resembling small, grass huts

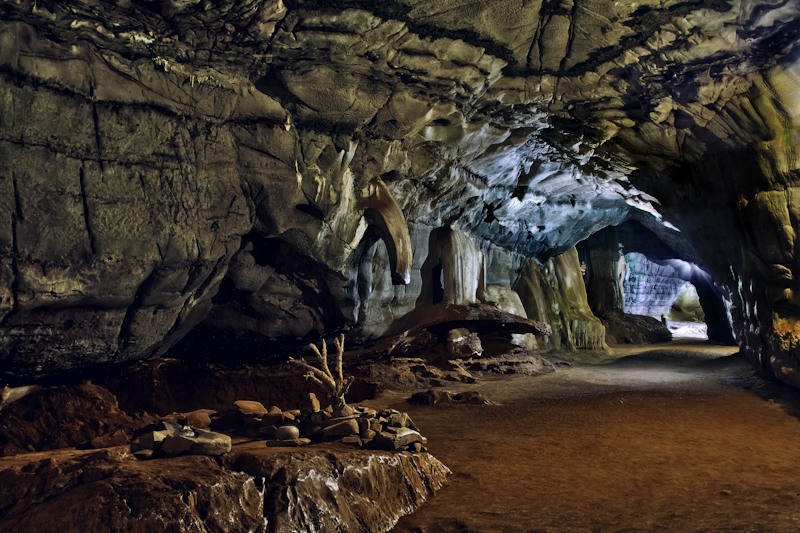
The entrance to the Sudwala Caves

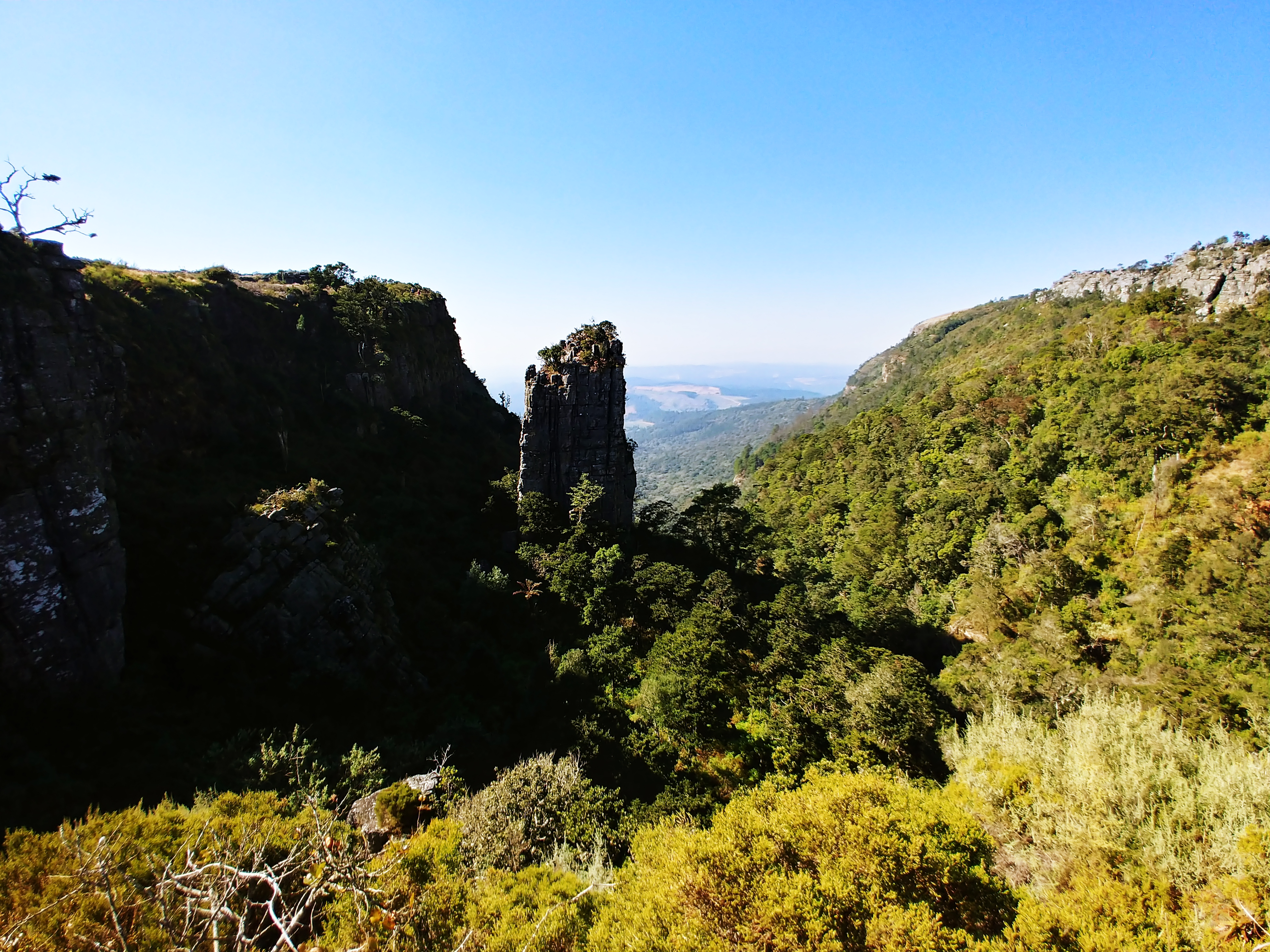
The Pinnacle rock formation on the Panorama Route in Mpumalanga

== See also ==
- Blyde River Canyon
- Mpumalanga
- List of waterfalls of South Africa
- List of mountain passes of South Africa
