= Xanthoparmelia wesselsii =

Scientific classification
- Kingdom: Fungi
- Division: Ascomycota
- Class: Lecanoromycetes
- Order: Lecanorales
- Family: Parmeliaceae
- Genus: Xanthoparmelia
- Species: X. wesselsii

Binomial name
- Xanthoparmelia wesselsii Hale (1986)

Species of lichen

Xanthoparmelia wesselsii is a species of terricolous (rock-dwelling), foliose lichen in the family Parmeliaceae. Found in Southern Africa, it was formally described as a new species in 1986 by the American lichenologist Mason Hale. The type specimen was collected by Hale from the summit of Long Tom Pass along R37 at an elevation of 2,140 m (7,020 ft), where he found it in a pasture growing on soil in sandstone outcrops. The species epithet honors the South African botanist Dirk C.J. Wessels. This lichen thallus grows loosely attached to its soil and humus substrate, measuring 4–7 cm (1.6–2.8 in) broad and comprising linear, elongated lobes that are 0.5–1.5 mm wide. It contains salazinic acid, consalazinic acid, and usnic acid.

== See also ==
- List of Xanthoparmelia species
