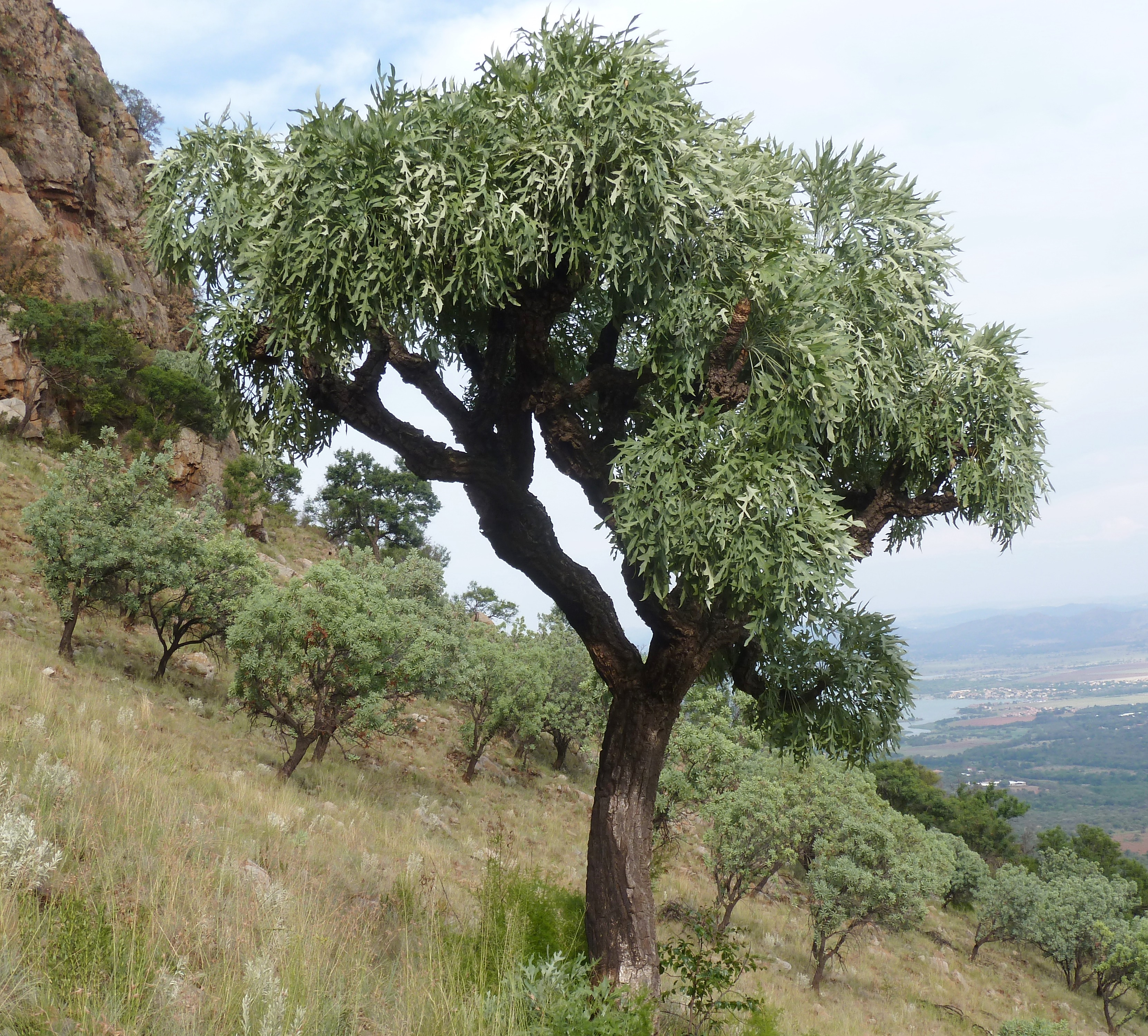

Conservation status
- Least Concern (IUCN 3.1)

Scientific classification
- Kingdom: Plantae
- Clade: Tracheophytes
- Clade: Angiosperms
- Clade: Eudicots
- Clade: Asterids
- Order: Apiales
- Family: Araliaceae
- Genus: Cussonia
- Species: C. paniculata

Binomial name
- Cussonia paniculata Eckl. & Zeyh.

= Cussonia paniculata =

Highveld cabbage tree

Species of tree

Cussonia paniculata, also known as kiepersol, is a large evergreen shrub or small tree up to 5 metres (16 ft) in height native to South Africa. The plant has large and bold textured grey foliage.

== Uses ==
The leaf is used ethnomedically to treat dysmenorrhea.

== Cultivation ==
Cussonia paniculata is cultivated as an ornamental plant for planting in temperate climate gardens and in container gardens.

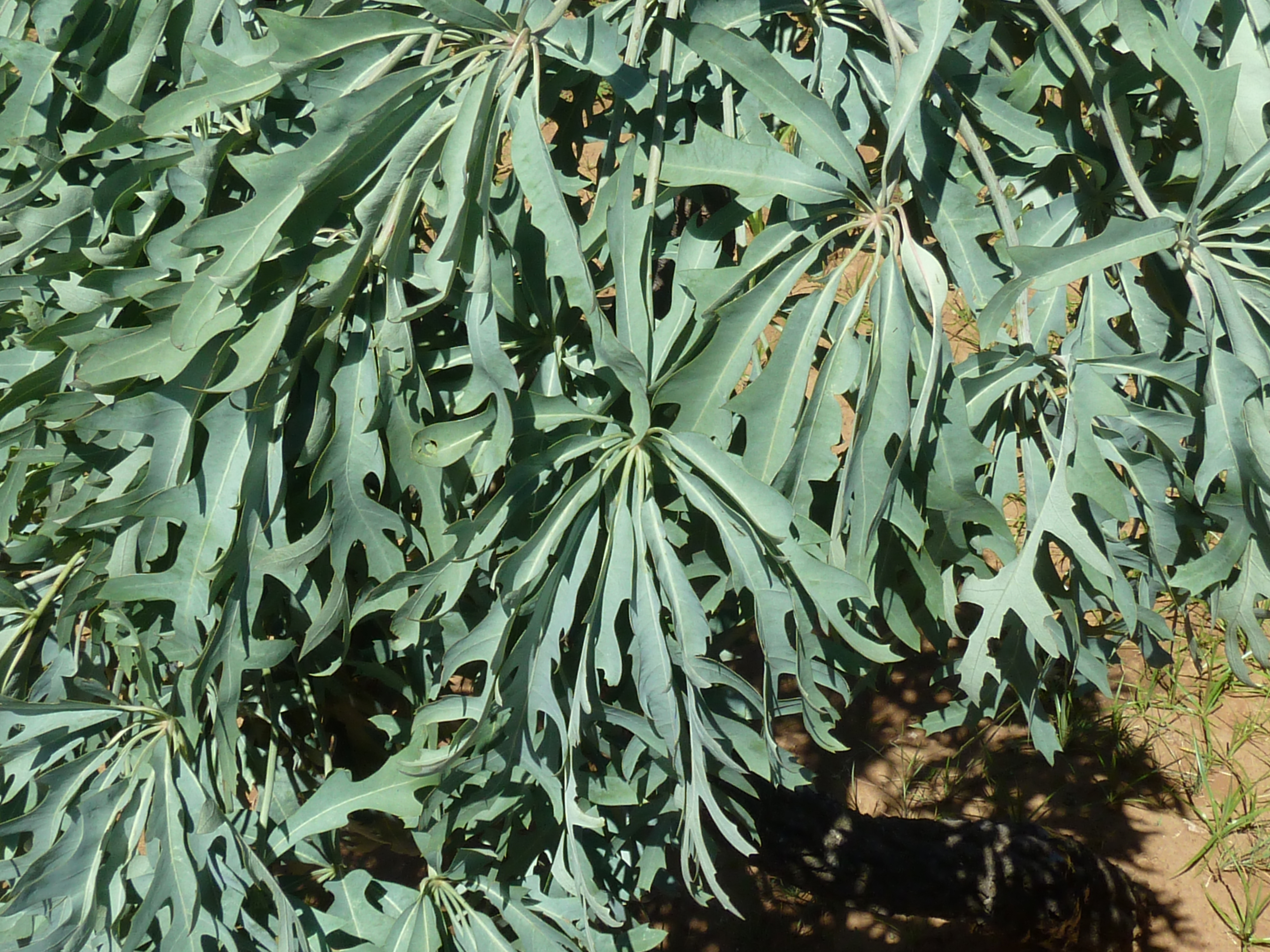
Close-up of foliage

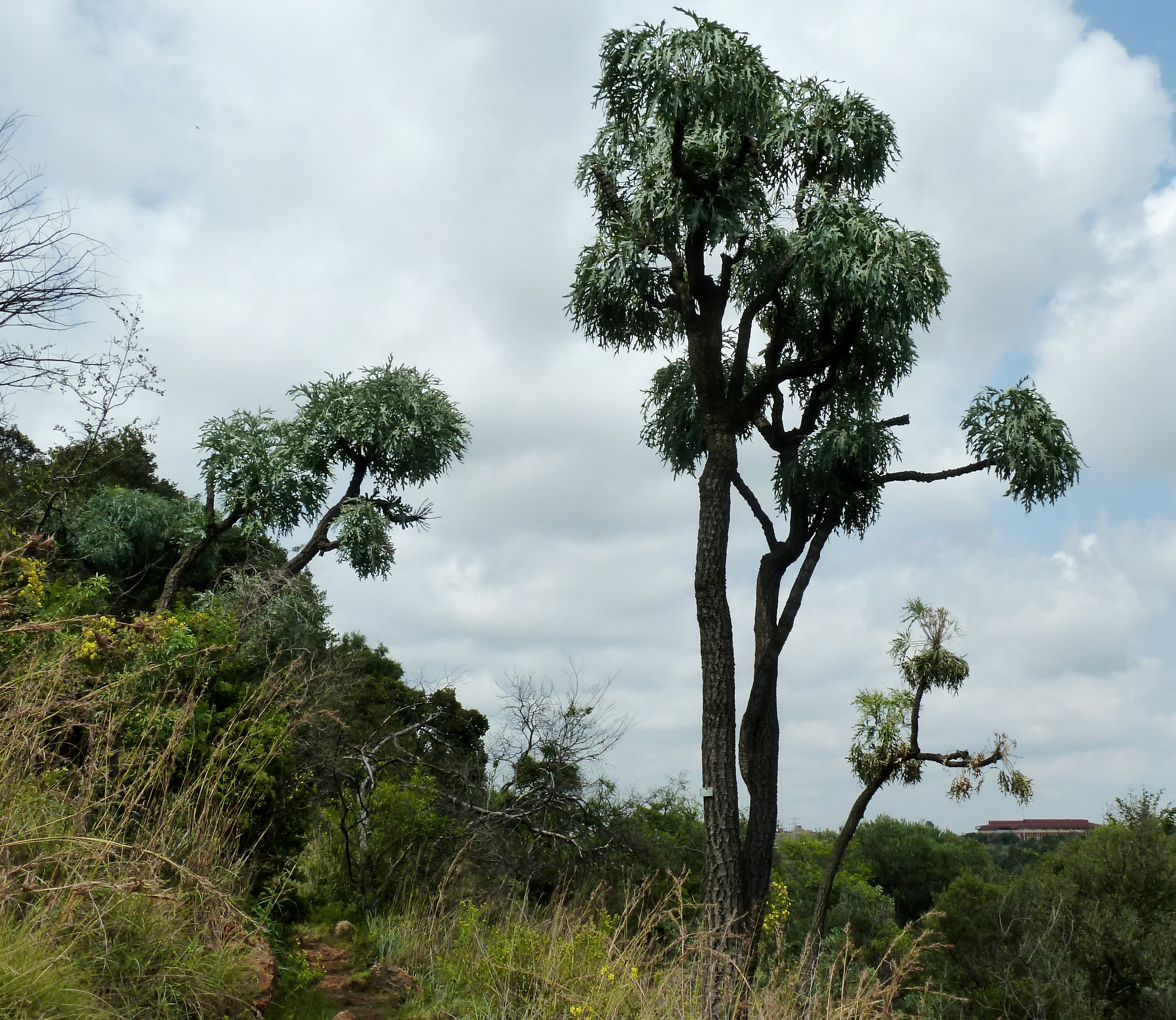
Tall specimens at Groenkloof N.R.

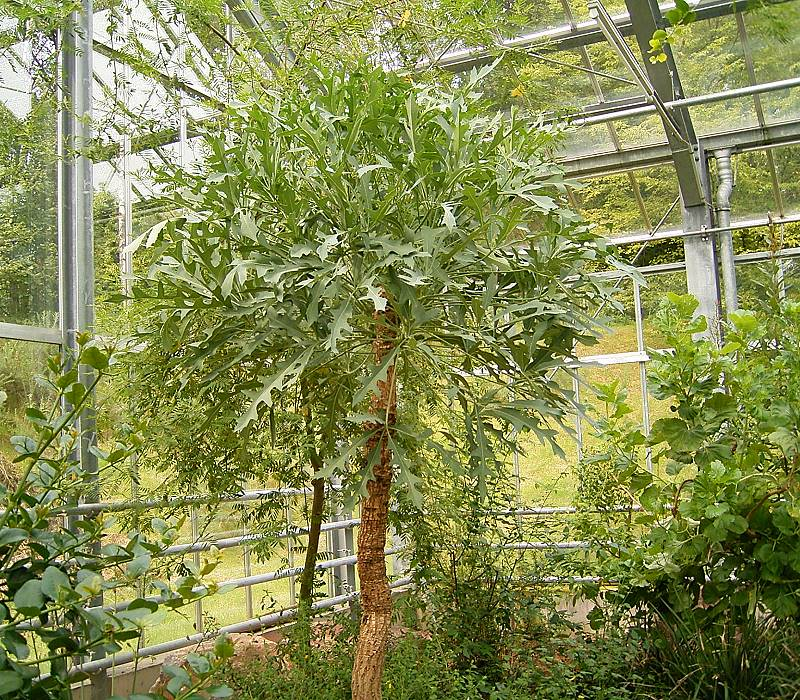
Cultivated at Bochum Botanical Garden

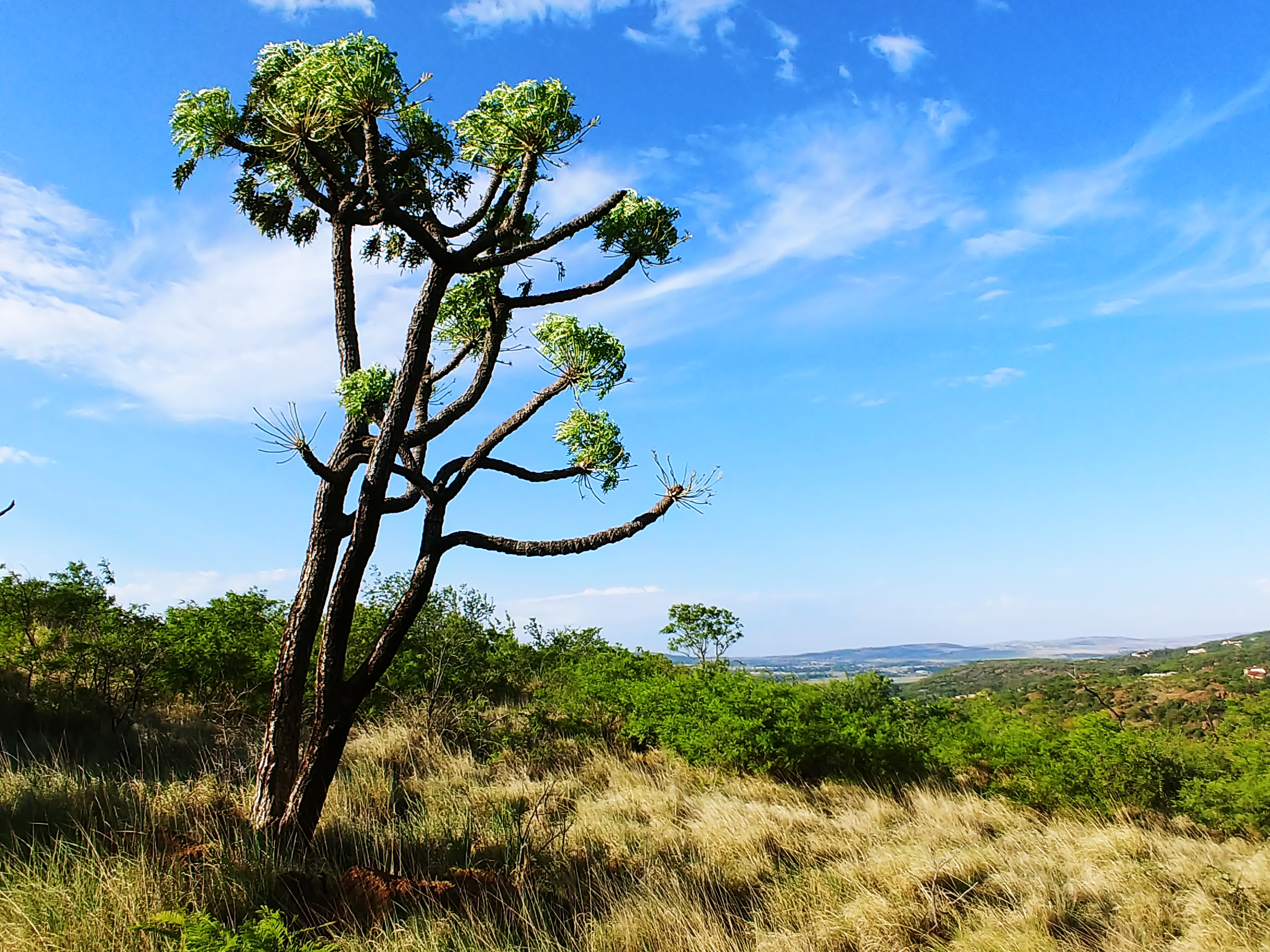
A young kiepersol in the Klipriviersberg Nature Reserve
