= Long Tom (cannon) =

Name of long-barreled cannons

Long Tom is a generic name for some early age cannon and field guns, used both on land as at sea.

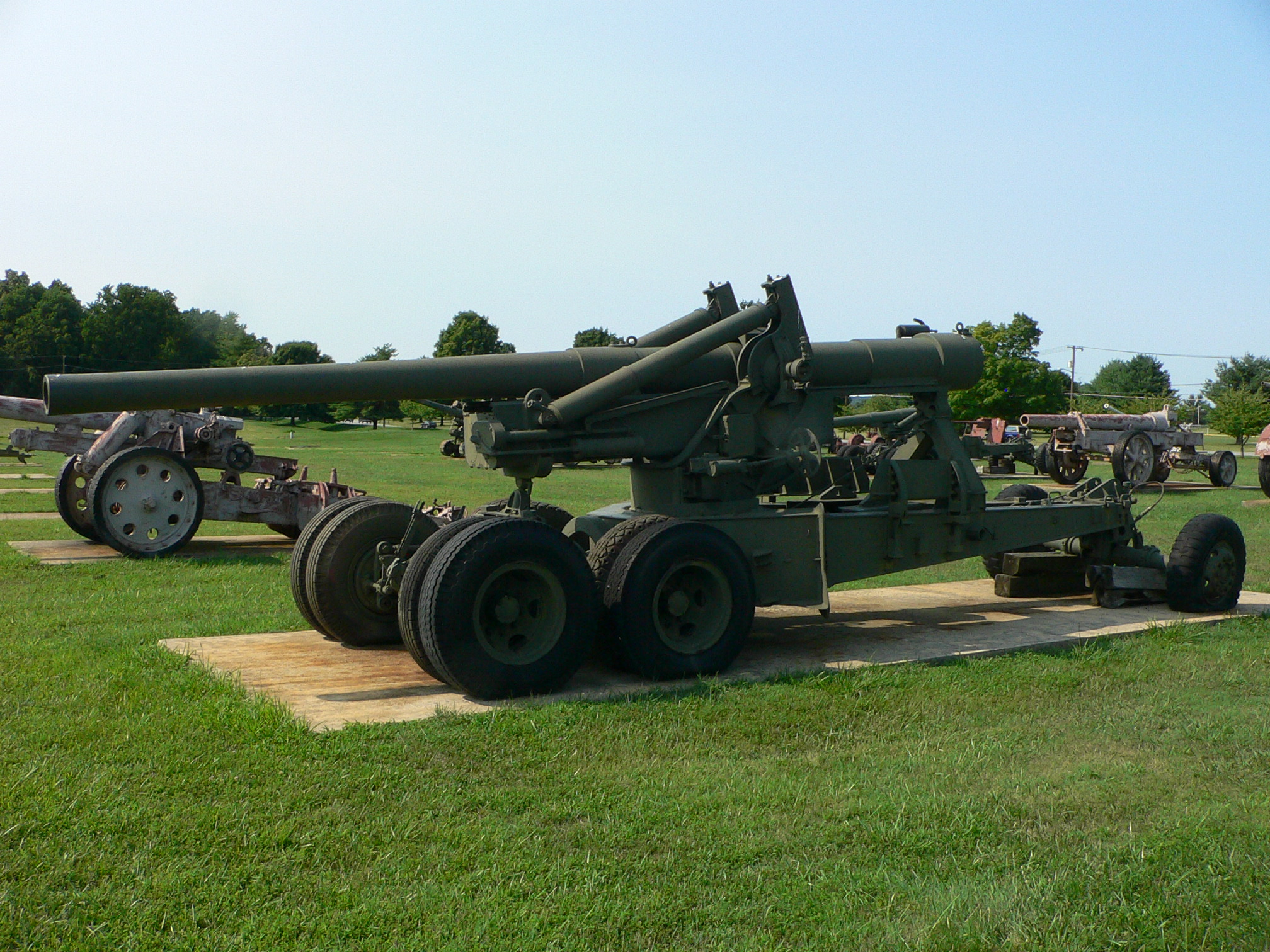
A 155 mm Long Tom

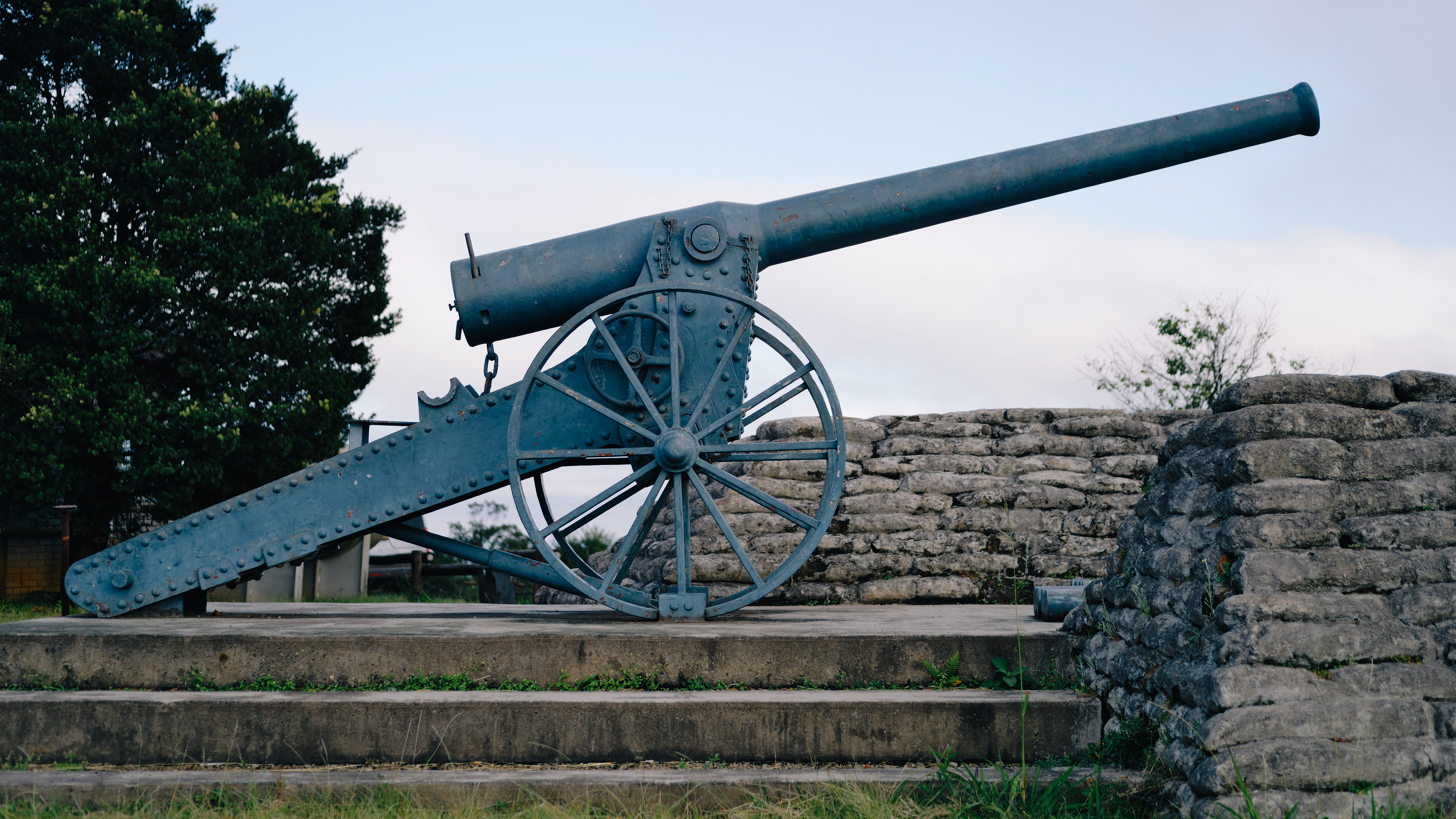
Profile view of the 155 mm Creusot Long Tom replica in the Long Tom Pass, Mpumalanga. Made in 1985 to commemorate the use of these cannon during the Second Boer War.

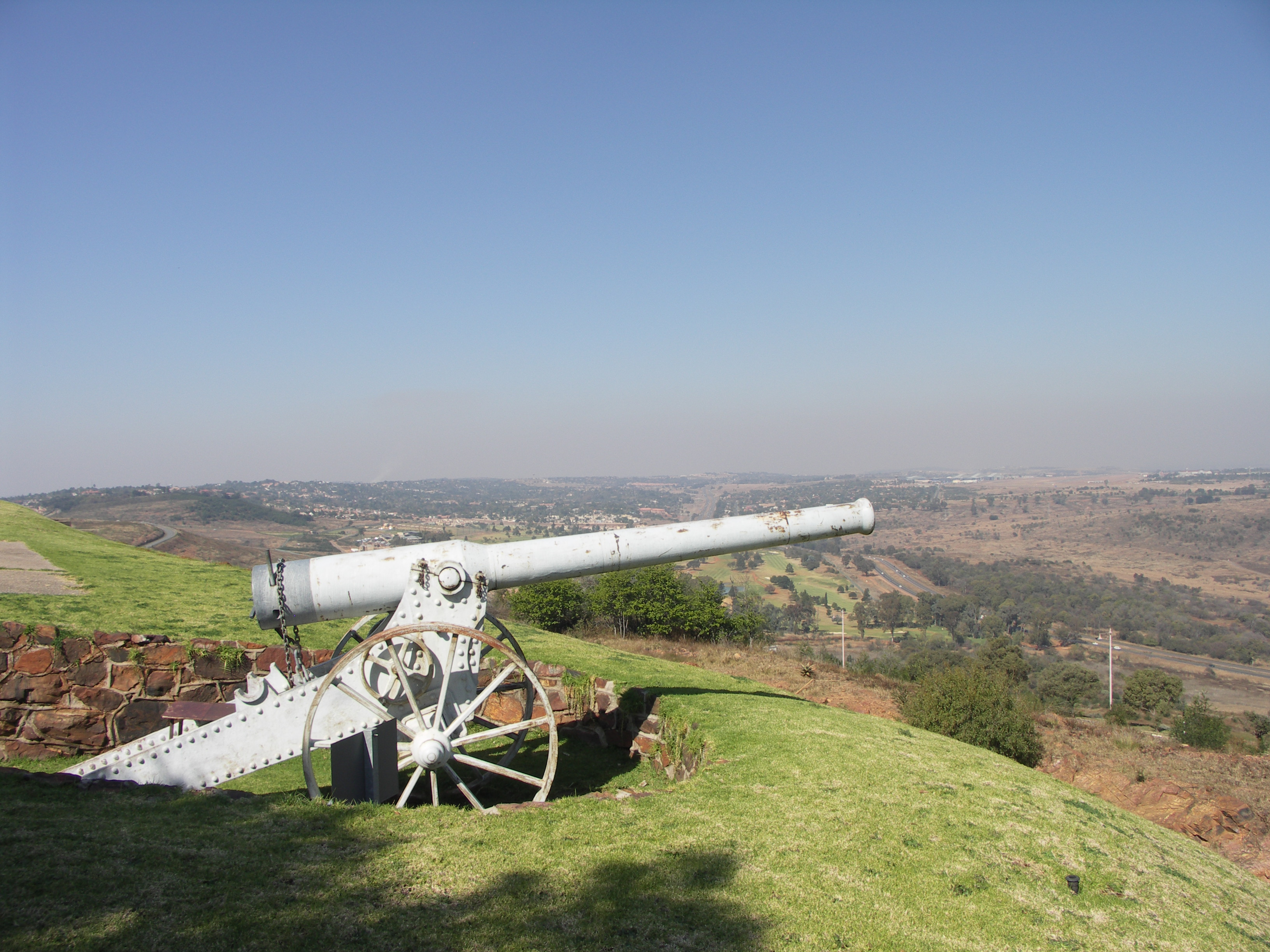
A 155 mm Creusot Long Tom replica at Fort Klapperkop outside Pretoria

More specifically it was used for:

- 155 mm Long Tom, a U.S. World War II era field gun
- 155 mm Creusot Long Tom, a Boer War field gun
- 64-pounder Long Tom, a U.S. Civil War cannon
- 42-pounder Long Tom, as found on the General Armstrong (1812)
- 24-or 32-pound "Long Tom" cannon, as found on the American USS Hamilton (1809) or Spanish Guerrero
- 18-pound Long Tom, as found on the American privateer Decatur
- Long Tom is the name of the cannon on the Jolly Roger, Captain Hook's ship, in Peter Pan by J. M. Barrie (novel, 1911)

== Bibliography ==
- Hogg, Ian V. (1998). Allied Artillery of World War Two. Marlborough, UK: Crowood Press. ISBN 1-86126-165-9.
