= Echo Caves =

Cave system in Limpopo, South Africa

Coordinates: 24°33′41″S 30°36′13″E

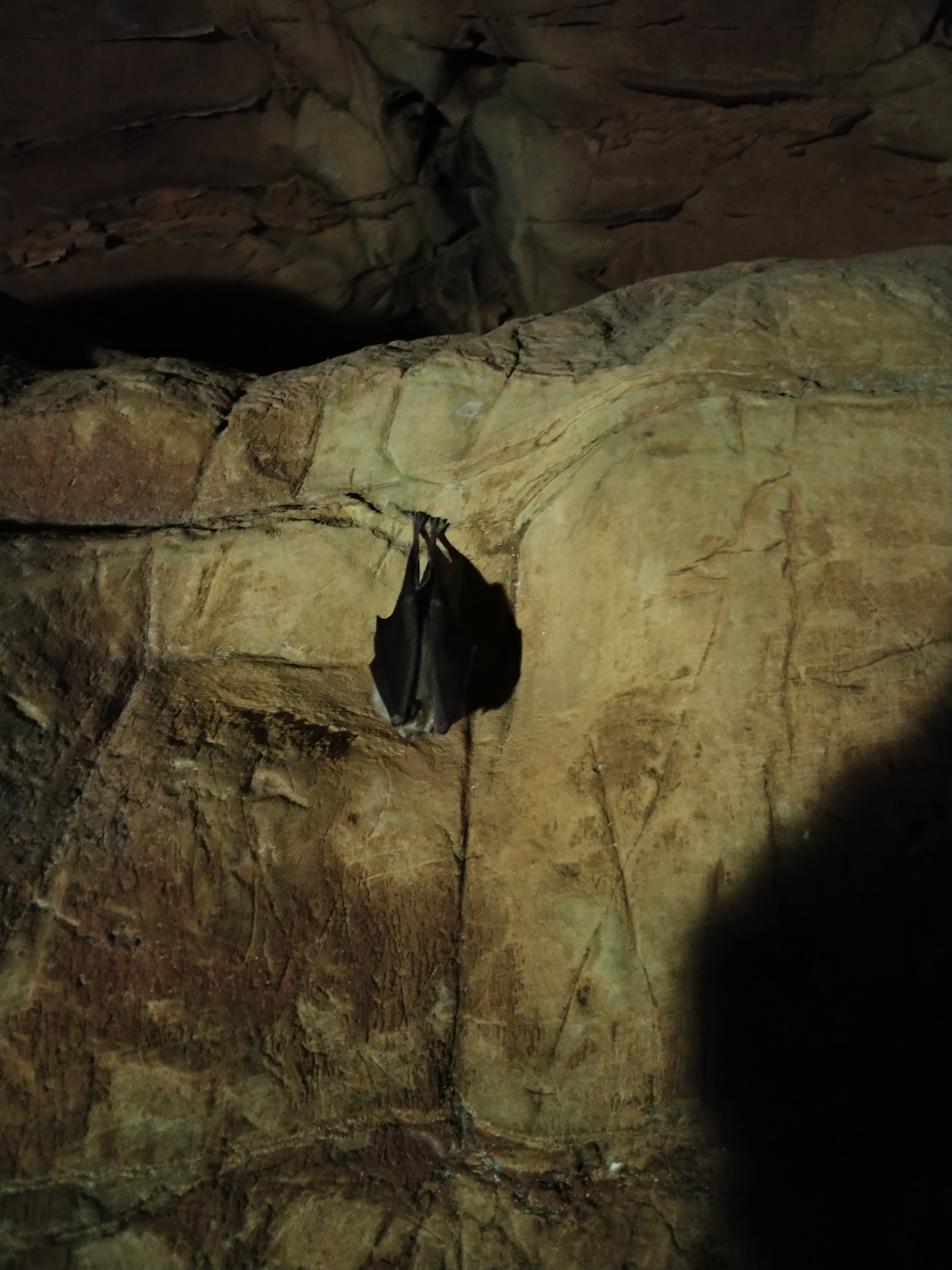
Bats inhabit the Echo Caves.

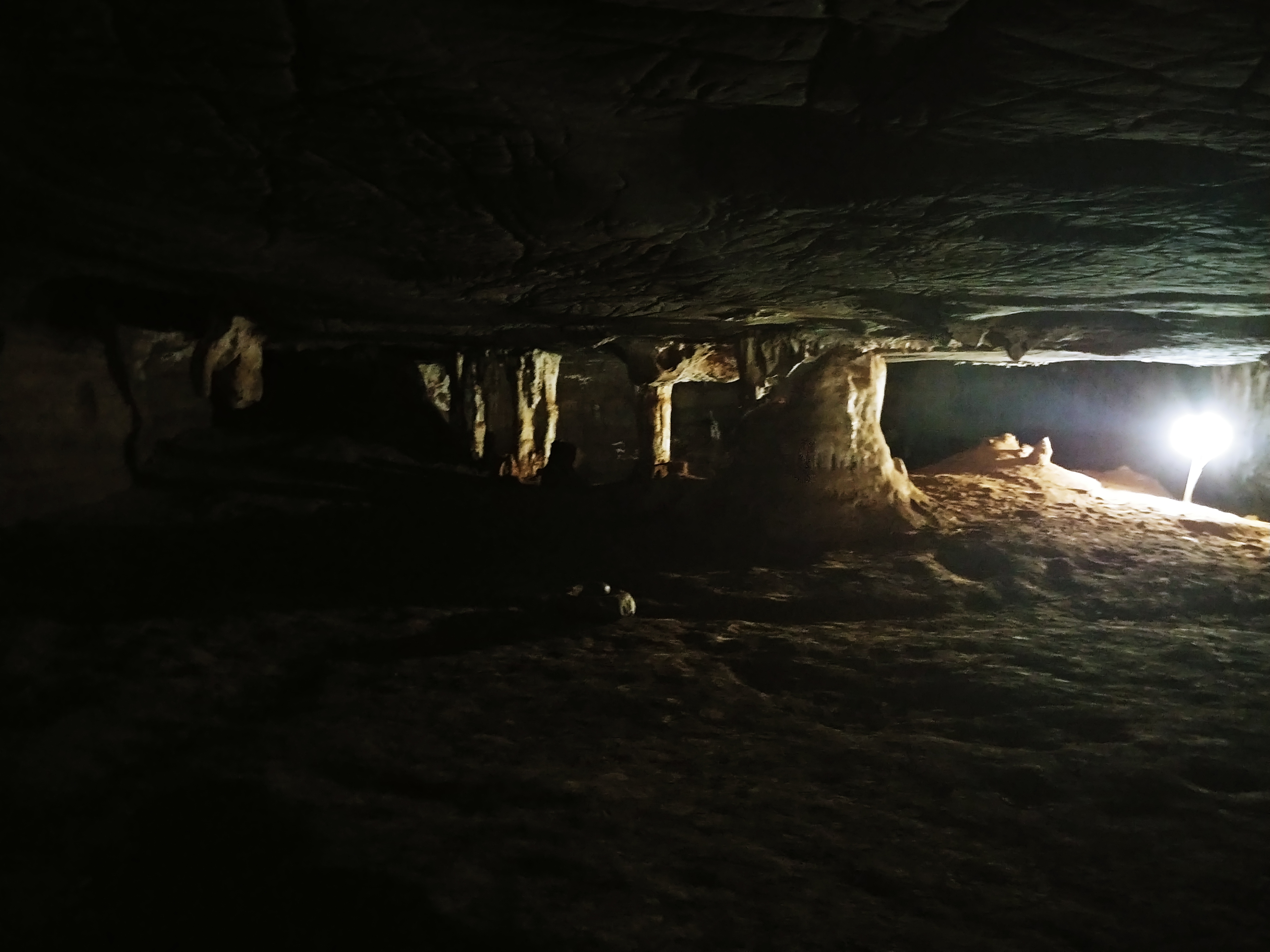
The Samson Chamber.

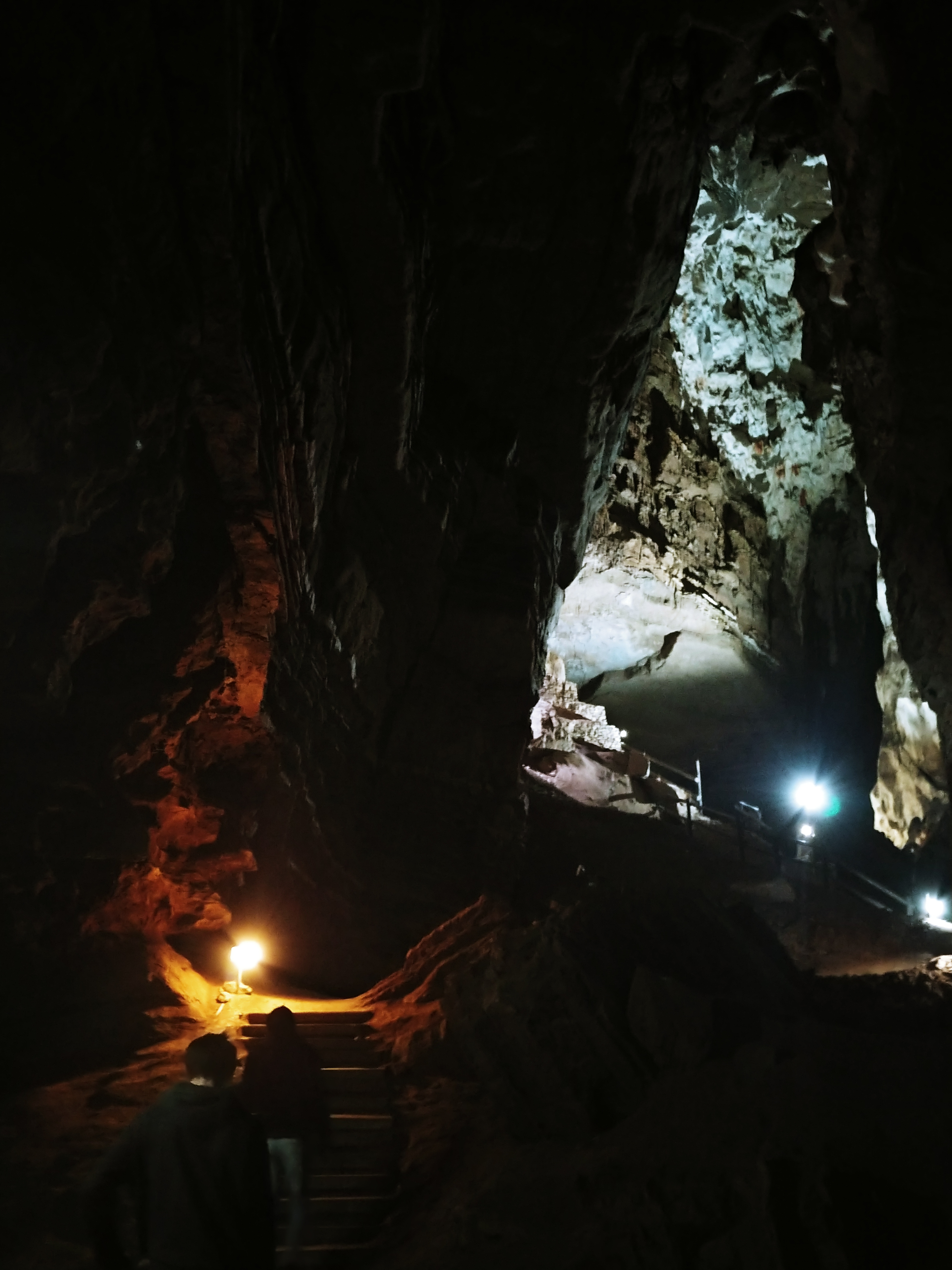
The enormous Madonna Chamber from below.

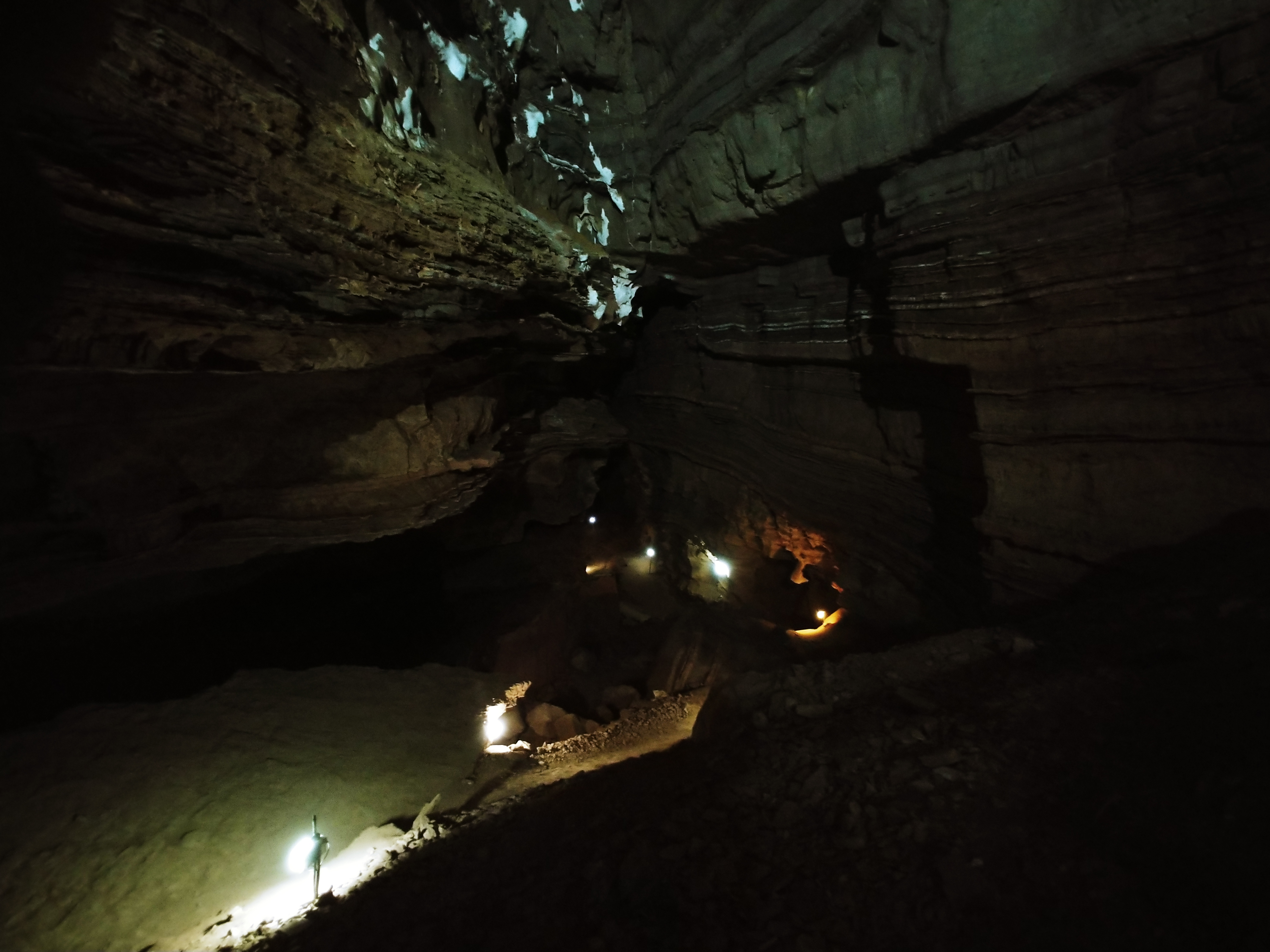
The enormous Madonna Chamber from above.

The Echo Caves in Limpopo, South Africa, are set in Precambrian dolomite rock, which was first laid down about 3800 million years ago, when Africa was still part of Gondwana. The caves are considered some of the oldest in the world. The Echo Caves are situated on the farm Klipfonteingrot, some 92 km north of the similar Sudwala Caves.

There are a number of speleothem structures in the cave; two of these are hollow stalactites which when hammered create echoes audible throughout and even outside the caves, thus the name of the caves. The caves are over 40 km long; regular tours are available for about 2 km of the tunnels and chambers.

The caves were used for shelter in recent centuries by the Pedi people; they slept in what is now called the Samson chamber (due to the limestone columns which appear to hold the low roof of the cave up).

== History ==
In the nineteenth century the Pedi lived in the Echo Caves. They used the hollow stalactites as a warning system to warn their people of attacks by neighbouring Swazi tribes. Many archeological artefacts and bones from those times are on display at the nearby Museum of Man.

In 1923, the caves were rediscovered by the owner of the farm Klipfonteinhoek, near Ohrigstad, who was looking for missing cattle. The caves were opened in 1959 as a tourist attraction. In the 1980s, more sealed caverns were discovered, and entrances created both into the existing caves and out to the hillside; the new discovery included the enormous Madonna chamber.

== Tourism ==
The Echo caves were opened as a tourist attraction in 1959, and have been declared a National Monument. The additional caves have been included in the tours since the 1980s. Some of the chambers (up to 60m high, in places) and formations include the Madonna chamber, the Samson chamber, the Rhino Horn, the Ostrich, the hollow stalactites, and Crystal Palace.

Following the brutal murder of the owner-operator of the caves in 2023, in which she and another resident were tortured and then set alight while still alive, the fate of the caves as a tourist attraction remaining open to the public is unknown.

== See also ==
- List of caves in South Africa
