= Voortrekker Fort, Ohrigstad =

Voortrekker Fort
- "Ohrigstad Fort"
- Ohrigstad, South Africa

Site information
- Type: Dry Wall construction, Mud brick construction.
- Controlled by: South Africa
- Open to the public: Yes
- Condition: Ruined

Site history
- Built: 1847
- Materials: Local stone and mud bricks
- Events: Great Trek

Garrison information
- Garrison: Local Voortrekker families

Voortrekker Fort/Ohrigstad Fort was constructed before 1847 to act as a refuge for local Voortrekker families due to the constant attacks of local Bantu tribes. It is situated in the Ohrigstad area of northern Mpumalanga province which was first settled by Europeans under the leadership of Andries Hendrik Potgieter.

== History ==
The Voortrekker Fort was built circa. 1847 by early pioneering Voortrekkers in modern day Mpumalanga Province, South Africa. The main purpose of the fortifications were to protect themselves and their families against possible attacks by the local tribes in the general Ohrigstad vicinity. The fort is in the same grounds as the Andries Hendrik Potgieter Gedenksaal. The fort was built using a combination of dry stone walling and mud brick layering with loopholes supported by slate stone lintels, making rifle-fire easier. The site is mostly in ruins today, however it has received Provincial Heritage status, and a new roof has been placed over the site in order to protect the mud construction.

== See also ==
- List of Castles and Fortifications in South Africa
- Great Trek
- Voortrekkers
