= Kiepersol =

- Location within Mpumalanga Location within South Africa
- Coordinates: 25.063°S 31.039°E
- Country: South Africa
- Province: Mpumalanga
- District: Ehlanzeni
- Municipality: Mbombela
- Time zone: UTC+2 (SAST)
- PO box: 1241

Kiepersol is a village in Mbombela Local Municipality in the Mpumalanga, province of South Africa.

Located close to the town of Hazyview, Kiepersol is named after the indigenous cabbage tree Cussonia paniculata, also called the Kiepersol, which grows in abundance in the lowveld, although the surrounding cultivations are mostly banana plantations. Other fruit grown nearby include mangos, avocados and macadamias. The town is close to the Phabeni Gate of the Kruger National Park.
