= Ohrigstad =

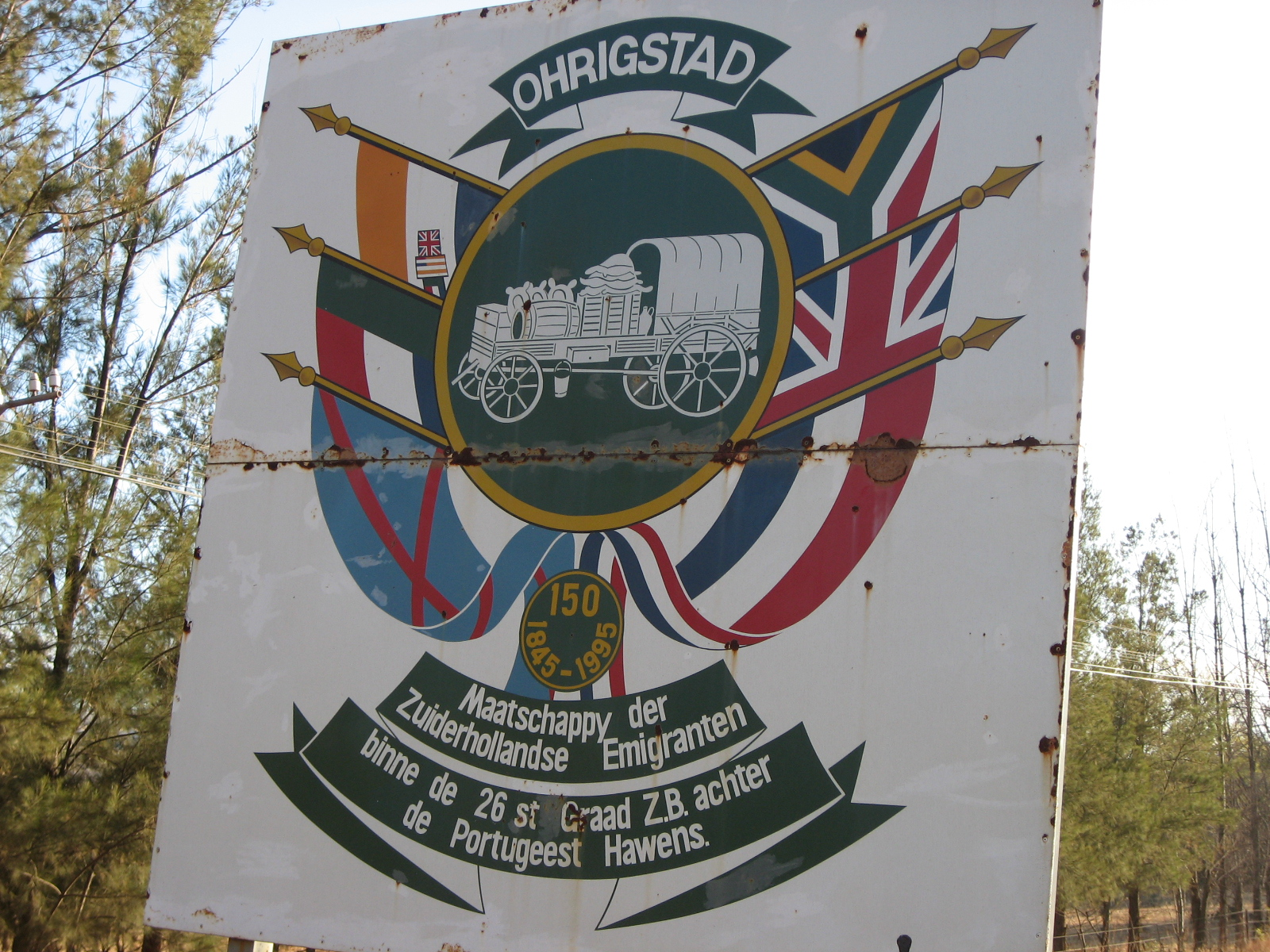
- Historical sign at Ohrigstad

- Location within Limpopo Location within South Africa
- Coordinates: 24°45′S 30°34′E
- Country: South Africa
- Province: Limpopo
- District: Sekhukhune
- Municipality: Fetakgomo Tubatse
- Established: 1845

Area
  - Total: 99.24 km^{2} (38.32 sq mi)

Population (2011)
  - Total: 521
  - Density: 5.25/km^{2} (13.6/sq mi)

Racial makeup (2011)
  - Black African: 48.6%
  - Coloured: 0.2%
  - Indian/Asian: 0.2%
  - White: 48.9%
  - Other: 2.1%

First languages (2011)
  - Afrikaans: 45.1%
  - Sepedi: 35.7%
  - English: 6.5%
  - Tsonga: 4.6%
  - Other: 8.1%
- Time zone: UTC+2 (SAST)
- Postal code (street): 1122
- PO box: 1122
- Area code: 013

Ohrigstad (Afrikaans for Ohrig city), formerly Andries Ohrig Stad, is a small town to the north of Lydenburg in the Limpopo province, South Africa.

== History ==
A fort was established by a group of Voortrekkers under the leadership of Andries Hendrik Potgieter with the help of a Dutch merchant Gregorius Ohrig. The settlers arrived in 1845 and were soon afterwards decimated by malaria and forced to abandon the area. Settlers only returned once the disease was under control. On the 14 May 1873, the area was proclaimed as a public gold field after the discovery of gold in the Selati River.

The Voortrekker, Pieter Willem Prinsloo, who left the Cape between 20 June 1837 and the end of March 1838, registered a farm Dorenhoek in the Ohrigstad area on 16 March 1846.

== Tourism ==
The Echo Caves are situated close to the town.

== See also ==
- Great Trek
- Voortrekker Fort
- Andries Hendrik Potgieter
