= Sudwala Caves =

Cave in Mpumalanga, South Africa

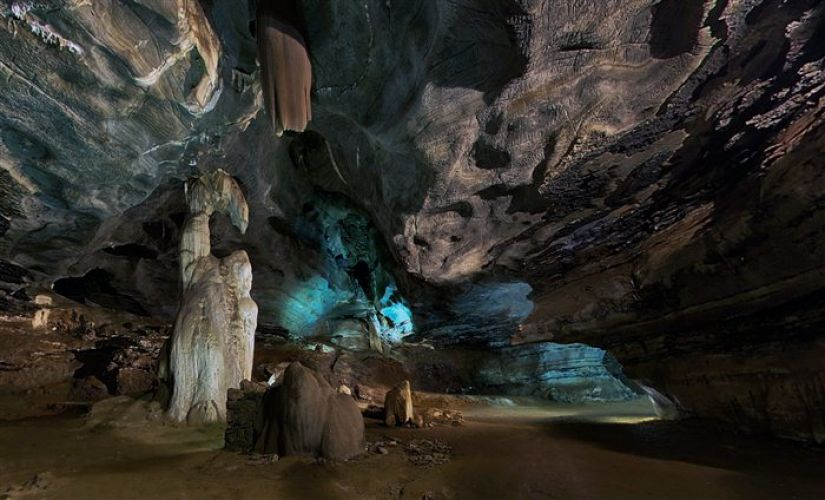
- First cavern Sudwala Caves
- Interactive map of Sudwala Caves
- Location: Mpumalanga
- Coordinates: 25°22′10.98″S 30°42′0.67″E
- Length: 79012

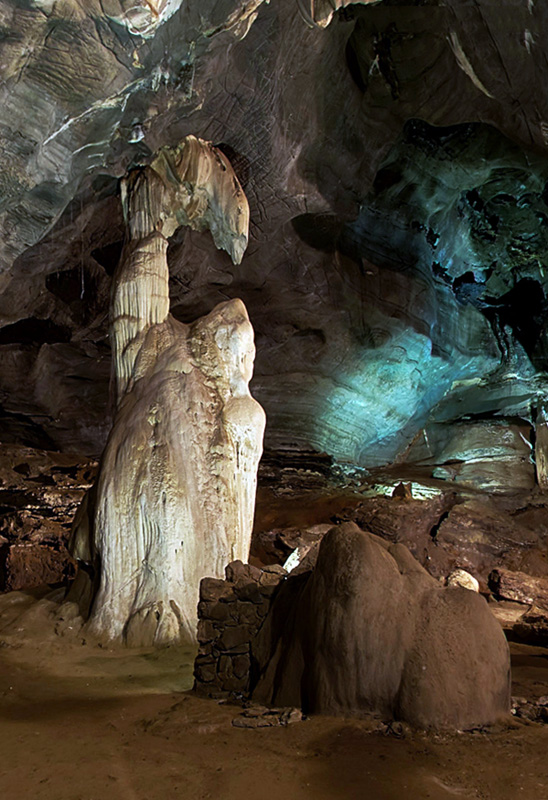
The screaming monster formation.

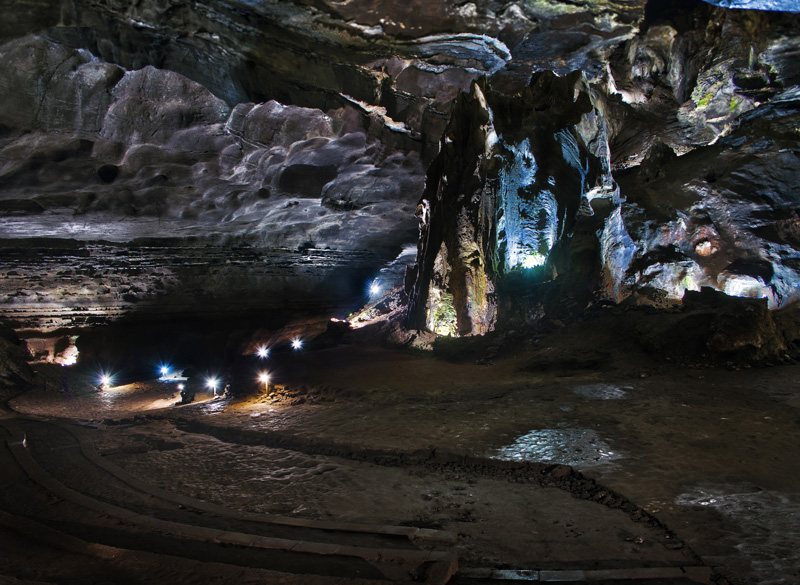
Another view deeper into the caves

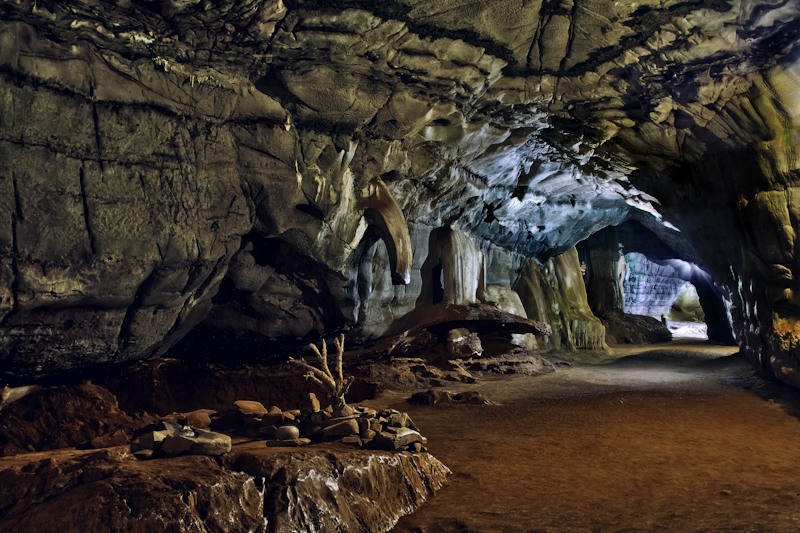
The entrance chamber.

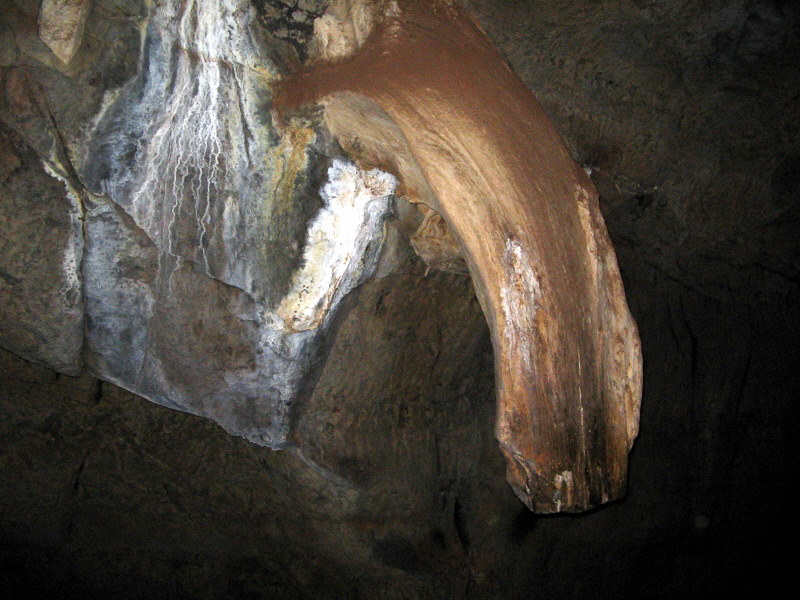
One of the flowstone features in the Sudwala Caves

The Sudwala Caves in Mpumalanga, South Africa, are set in Precambrian dolomite rock, which was first laid down about 2.8 billion years ago. The caves themselves formed about 240 million years ago. They are one of the oldest caves in the world.

There are a number of speleothem structures in the cave, known by names such as the "Lowveld Rocket", "Samson's Pillar", and the "Screaming Monster"; some have been dated to 200 million years old. There are also microbial fossils of a cyanobacterium known as collenia in the rock; these formed 2 billion years ago.

The caves were used for shelter in prehistoric times, probably due in part to a constant supply of fresh air from an unknown source in the caves.

== History ==
=== Creation and early inhabitants ===
The Sudwala Caves are one of the oldest known caves in the world, and began to form around 240 million years ago. Their formation was caused when natural acid in the groundwater seeped through the faults and joints of the Precambrian dolomite rock. Whilst there are not many signs of life inside the cave, the discovery of primitive stone tools indicate that early humans may have inhabited the cave from as far back as the early Stone Age era (2.5 million years ago), spanning until the late Stone Age era up to a few thousand years B.C.

=== Recent history ===
In the nineteenth century the Sudwala Caves were used by Somquba, the brother of the Swazi heir apparent, as a fortress. In a power struggle for the Swazi throne, many bloody battles were fought at the cave entrance. The story begins as follows: When King Sobhuza I of Swaziland died in 1836, his heir was Mswati II, who was still a minor and too young to ascend the vacant throne. A cousin, Paramount Chief Usutfu, was installed as regent, which proved to be a flawed choice. Usutfu was too weak to prevent Mswati's brother Somquba from making an effective bid for the throne by calling an Incwala, or Festival of the First Fruit. The significance of this is that it is high treason, not to mention sacrilege, for any other person other than the Swazi king to hold an Incwala. After a skirmish with Mswati's army near the Mgwenyana River, 9 km west of Barberton, Somquba and his followers fled the area, with some 500 head of Mswati's cattle. They crossed the Crocodile River and settled near the Mankelexele Mountains, between Elandshoek and Schagen, about 10 km from what are now the Sudwala Caves. Their settlement was known as M’selezie.

Somquba sought and received protection from the newly established Boer settlement of Lydenburg. He made a formal alliance with the (1856–57) Lydenburg Republic.

There was continuous conflict between Mswati's and Somquba's followers in the form of raids and cattle theft. The Boers continued to side with Somquba, in return for labour to dig the first water canal at Lydenburg. Another benefit for the Boers was that Somquba acted as a buffer for them, against Mswati.

During the early 1860s Somquba came to know of the Caves, and subsequently, in times of conflict, he and his followers would take refuge there, with their cattle. They stock-piled food and there was plenty of water, so it made a strong refuge. Somquba maintained observation posts, and always kept the cave entrance clear, so that he could retreat there in a hurry. At that time stage the cave mouth was much smaller, and could barely accommodate the long horns of his small herd of prized Nguni cattle, as they were led in by hand, in single file. The principal guardian of the Caves’ entrance was Sudwala (mispronounced from Sidvwaba by the Boers), Somquba's chief inDuna (councillor/captain) and brother, whose name is thus commemorated to this day, and whose spirit is legendarily said to linger in the Caves. Today nobody knows how many times Somquba took refuge inside the Caves, but many bloody battles were fought at the site. At one time, the ever-persistent regiments of Mswati built a massive bonfire at the entrance, while Somquba and his followers were inside, in an attempt to suffocate them, but the natural airflow in the Caves foiled this attack. Help was sent for and received from a Lydenburg Boer commando, led by one Abel Erasmus. The commando drove off Mswati's regiments, and freed Somquba. Traces of the fire are still visible to this day. Somquba and his followers used the caves as refuge, until Somquba was killed in an unexpected attack. Survivors stayed on under the leadership of Sudwala, and that is how the caves got their name.

During the Second Boer War, in 1900, the caves were used by the Boers to store ammunition for their 94-pounder Long Tom guns. It was thought that the caves may have been used by President Paul Kruger to store the legendary "Kruger Millions", gold bullion which reputedly disappeared somewhere between Waterval Onder and Nelspruit during Paul Kruger's flight from Pretoria to Lourenço Marques (now Maputo) in Mozambique.

In 1914 a company was formed to excavate huge amounts of bat guano; this was sold as fertilizer to farmers.

== Tourism ==
The Sudwalaskraal farm that is home to the caves was purchased in 1965 by Philippus Rudolf Owen, and he opened the caves as a tourist attraction. The caves are now administered by the African Heritage Foundation and are open 365 days a year including public holidays.

The "Miriam Makeba Hall" is a large amphitheatre inside the Sudwala Caves. It is 70 metres in diameter and 37 metres high, with a constant temperature of 17 °C. This chamber was used as a concert hall on a number of occasions, including July 1970, when the Russian singer Ivan Rebroff gave a concert. Concerts were stopped due to vandalism in the caves in 2002, but were started again in 2006. Chris Chameleon performed in the caves with the Drakensberg Boys' Choir as part of the InniBos Arts Festival in 2012. The local Stevenson-Hamilton Pipe Band also performed in the caves on 10-03-2013 as part of World Bagpipe Day celebrations. Other artists include Elvis Blue the UJ Choir and a variety of other traditional local musicians.

The Sudwala Caves are a popular tourist attraction in Mpumalanga. One-hour tours of the cave are run during the day, and a monthly five-hour-long Crystal Tour takes visitors 2000 metres through the cave, with the tour culminating at a chamber that bears aragonite crystals and the Sudwala Star. A documentary film called the "Cave Diaries" was made about the Crystal Tour.

== See also ==
- List of caves in South Africa
