= Long Tom Pass =

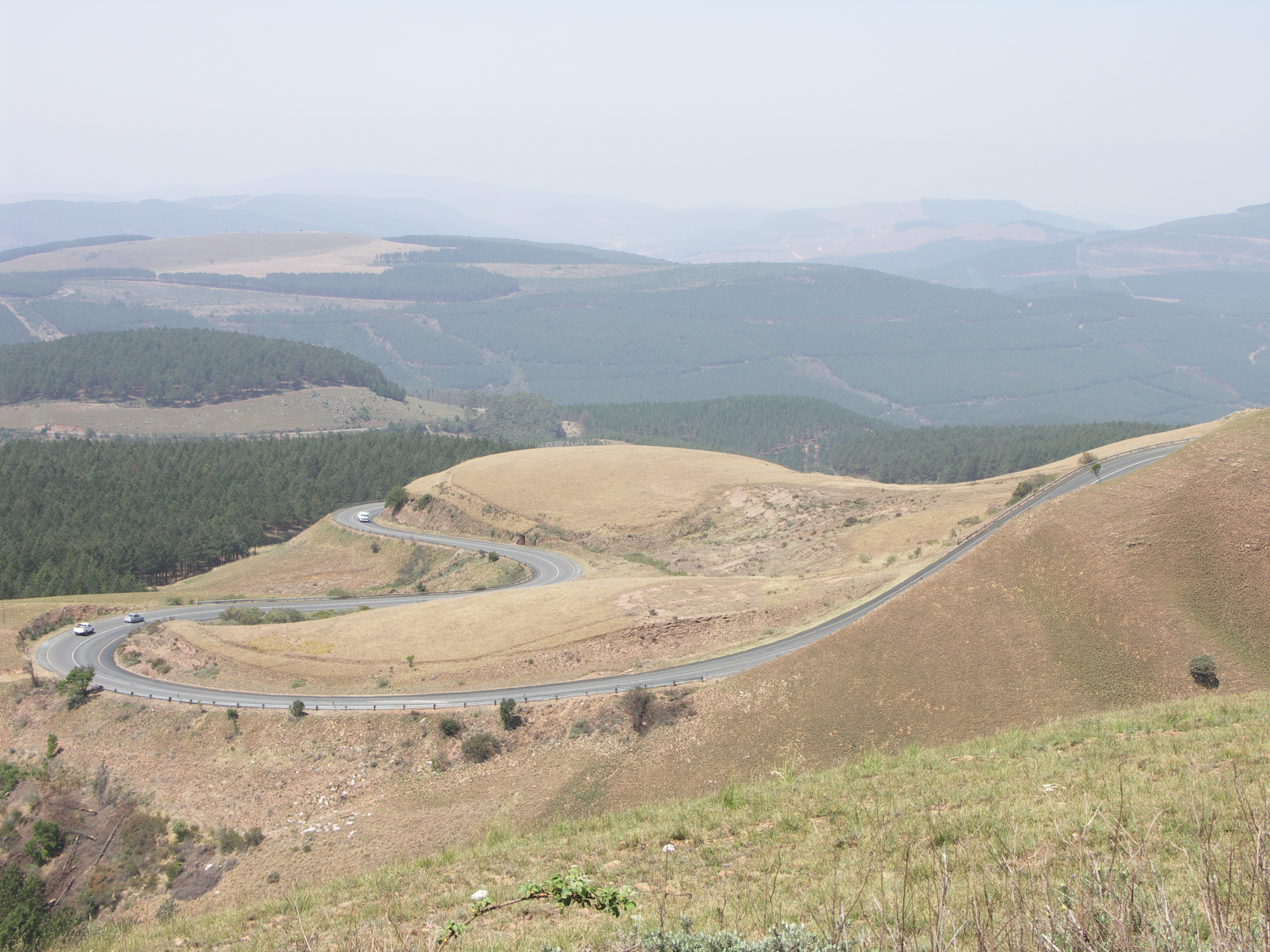
- The Long Tom Pass looking along the R37 towards Sabie

- Location within South Africa
- Elevation: 2,150 m (7,050 ft)

Third Approach
- Location: Between Sabie and Lydenburg, South Africa
- Range: Drakensberg Mountains
- Coordinates: 25°08′28.5″S 30°36′17.8″E

Long Tom Pass is a mountain pass on the Great Escarpment situated in the Mpumalanga province, on the R37 regional route between Lydenburg and Sabie (South Africa). It is named after the Long Tom cannon.

== Route ==
The route up Long Tom Pass starts at 1456m and climbs 682 vertical metres to an altitude of 2138m at its end. The summit of the pass lies at an altitude of 2150m. The pass is part of the Mpumalanga Panorama Route and carries appropriately heavy traffic both tourist and commercial. The pass is prone to heavy mist and can be dangerous in low visibility conditions.

== Long Tom Monument ==
A monument commemorating the last use of the Boer 155 mm Creusot Long Tom guns during the Second Boer War is located in the pass, about 21 kilometres (13 mi) from Sabie.

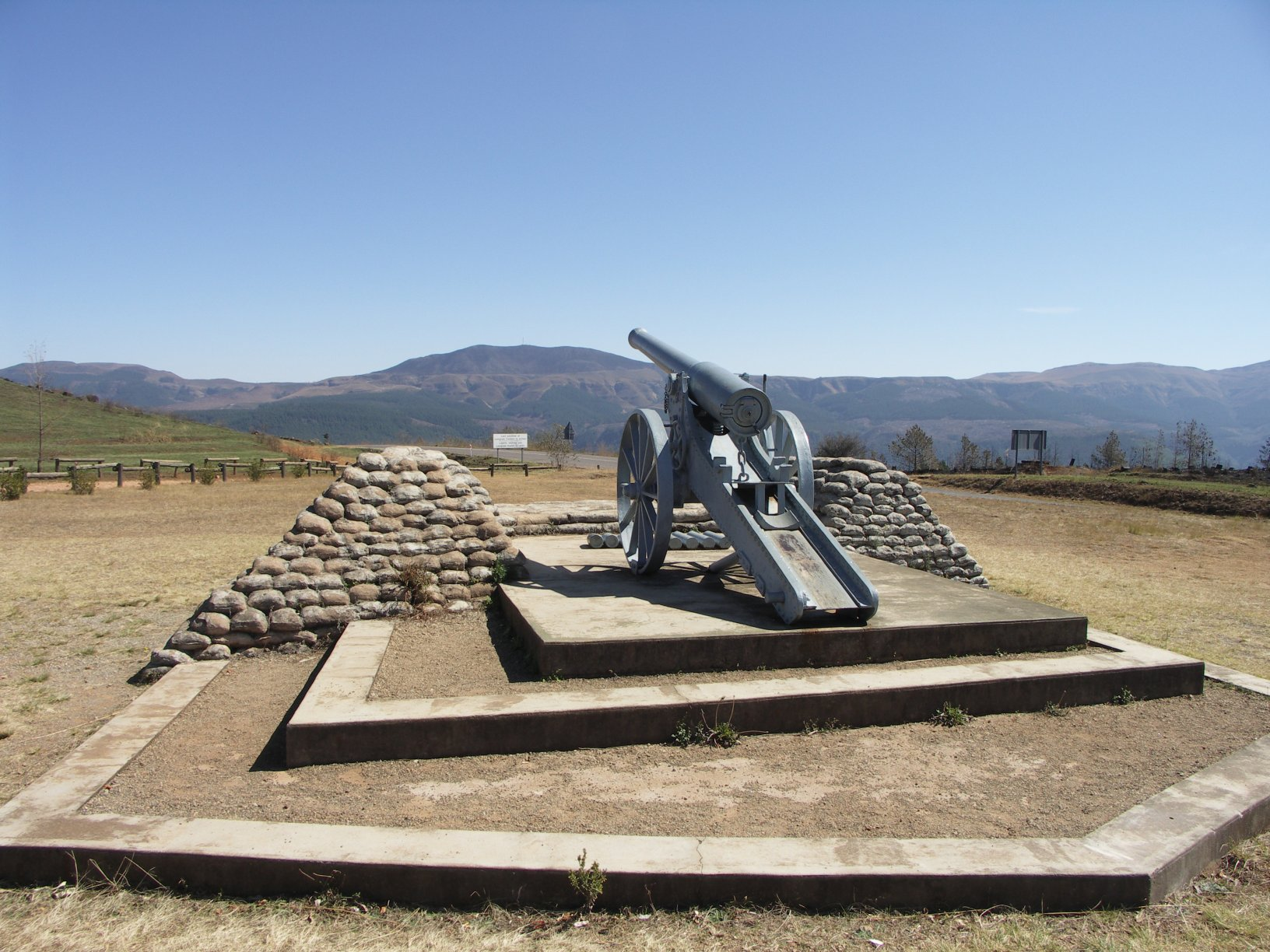
Long Tom Monument
