= Berlin Falls =

Waterfall in Mpumalanga, South Africa

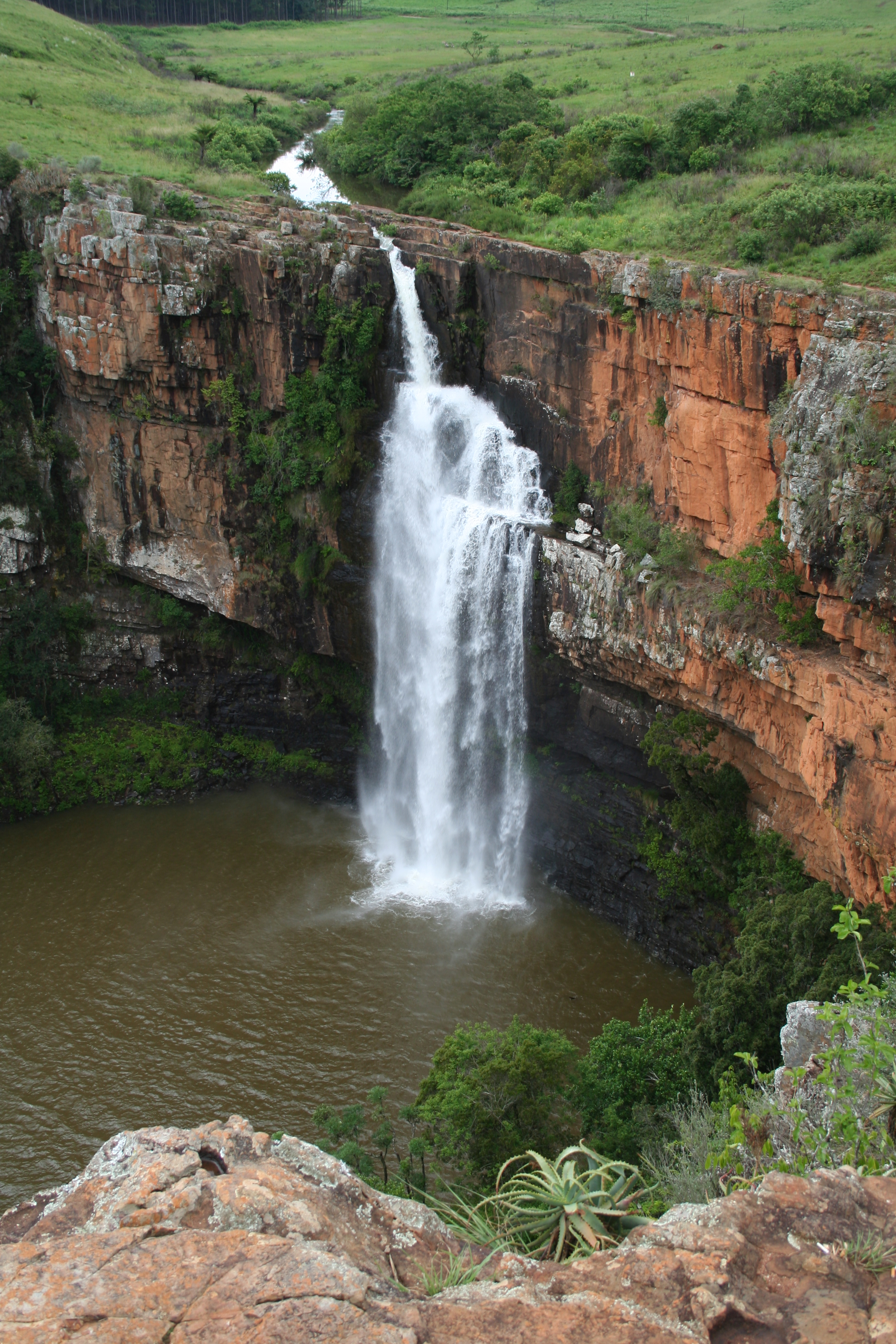
- Berlin Falls
- Interactive map of Berlin Falls
- Location: Mpumalanga, South Africa
- Coordinates: 24°50′37.37″S 30°50′33.03″E
- Total height: 80 metres (260 ft)
- Number of drops: 1
- Watercourse: Sabine River

The Berlin Falls is a waterfall in Mpumalanga, South Africa. They are located close to God's Window and the highest waterfall in South Africa's Mpumalanga province, Lisbon Falls. They are less than a tenth of the height of South Africa's tallest waterfall, the Tugela Falls, and are better known for their beauty.

Berlin Falls, which forms part of the Blyde River Canyon on the Panorama route, is one of several waterfalls that can be found in the Sabie region – the others being Horseshoe Falls, Lone Creek Falls, Bridal Veil Falls, Mac-Mac Falls, and the highest waterfall in Mpumalanga, Lisbon Falls.

The Berlin Falls cascade from the centre of a sheer cliff that stands roughly 80m tall. The shape of the falls is likened to a giant candle. A narrow, natural channel at the top of the falls creates the ‘wick’ of the candle, and as the water drops from this point, it fans out creating the rest of the candle before emptying out into the pool below.

Berlin Falls gets its name from miners who ventured to South Africa from Europe during the gold rush, and named each waterfall in the region after their home towns, or places from their home countries.

Visitors to the Berlin Falls can explore the area by foot, picnic around the waterfall, and take a dip in the pool at the base of the waterfall. Visitors may wish to look out for the Blyde River Protea, endemic to this area of the Mpumalanga escarpment.

The falls are on the Sabine River and fall 80 metres (260 ft), dumping into a circular basin flanked by red cliffs.

== Etymology ==
The falls were named after the Berlyn Creek and the Farm Berlyn, on which the falls are located.

== See also ==
- List of waterfalls
- List of waterfalls in South Africa
- Lisbon Falls
