= Sabieite =

General
- Category: Minerals
- Formula: (NH_{4})Fe^{3+}(SO_{4})_{2}

Identification
- Color: White
- Luster: Earthy
- Streak: White

Sabieite is a mineral with the chemical formula (NH_{4})Fe^{3+}(SO_{4})_{2}. Its type locality is Lone Creek Falls cave, Sabie, Pilgrim's Rest District Ehlanzeni, Mpumalanga Province, South Africa. Its crystals are trigonal to trapezohedral. It is white and leaves a white streak. It is transparent and has an earthy luster. Sabieite is rated 2 on the Mohs Scale.
