= Horseshoe Falls (disambiguation) =

Horseshoe Falls is the Canadian portion of Niagara Falls on the Niagara River, also known as the Canadian Falls

Horseshoe Falls may also refer to:

== Places ==
- Horseshoe Falls (British Columbia)
- Horseshoe Falls (South Africa) near Sabie, Mpumalanga
- Horseshoe Falls (Tasmania)
- Horseshoe Falls (Victoria)
- Horseshoe Falls (Wales), the source of the Llangollen Canal
- A waterfall and powerplant on the Bow River approximately 35 miles (55 km) west of Calgary, Alberta.

== See also ==
- Horseshoe (disambiguation)
- Falls (disambiguation)
- Fall (disambiguation)
