= Lisbon Falls (waterfall) =

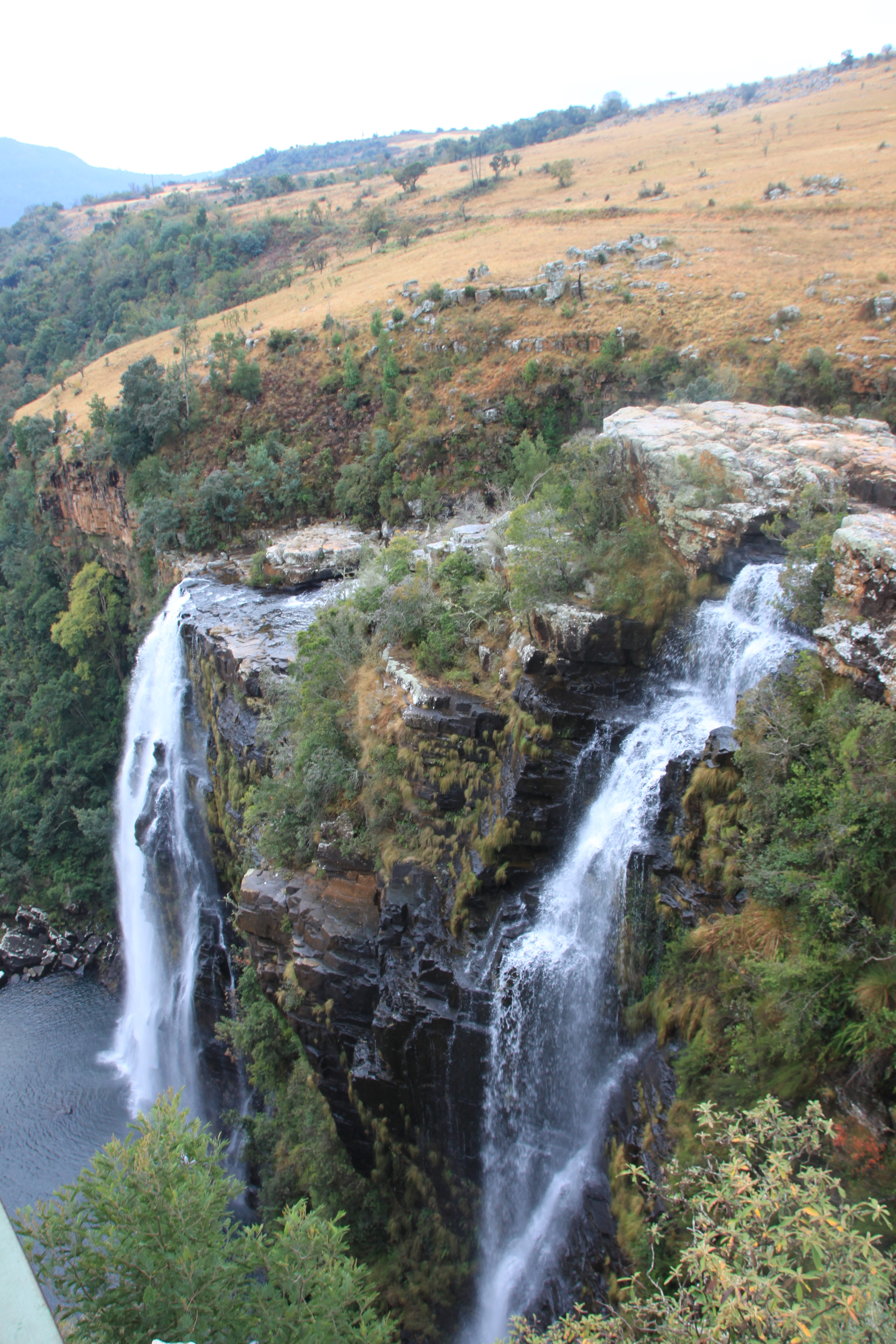

- Location within Mpumalanga Location within South Africa
- Location: Mpumalanga, South Africa
- Coordinates: 24°51′38″S 30°50′07″E
- Total height: 94 metres (308 ft)
- Number of drops: 1
- Watercourse: Lisbon Creek

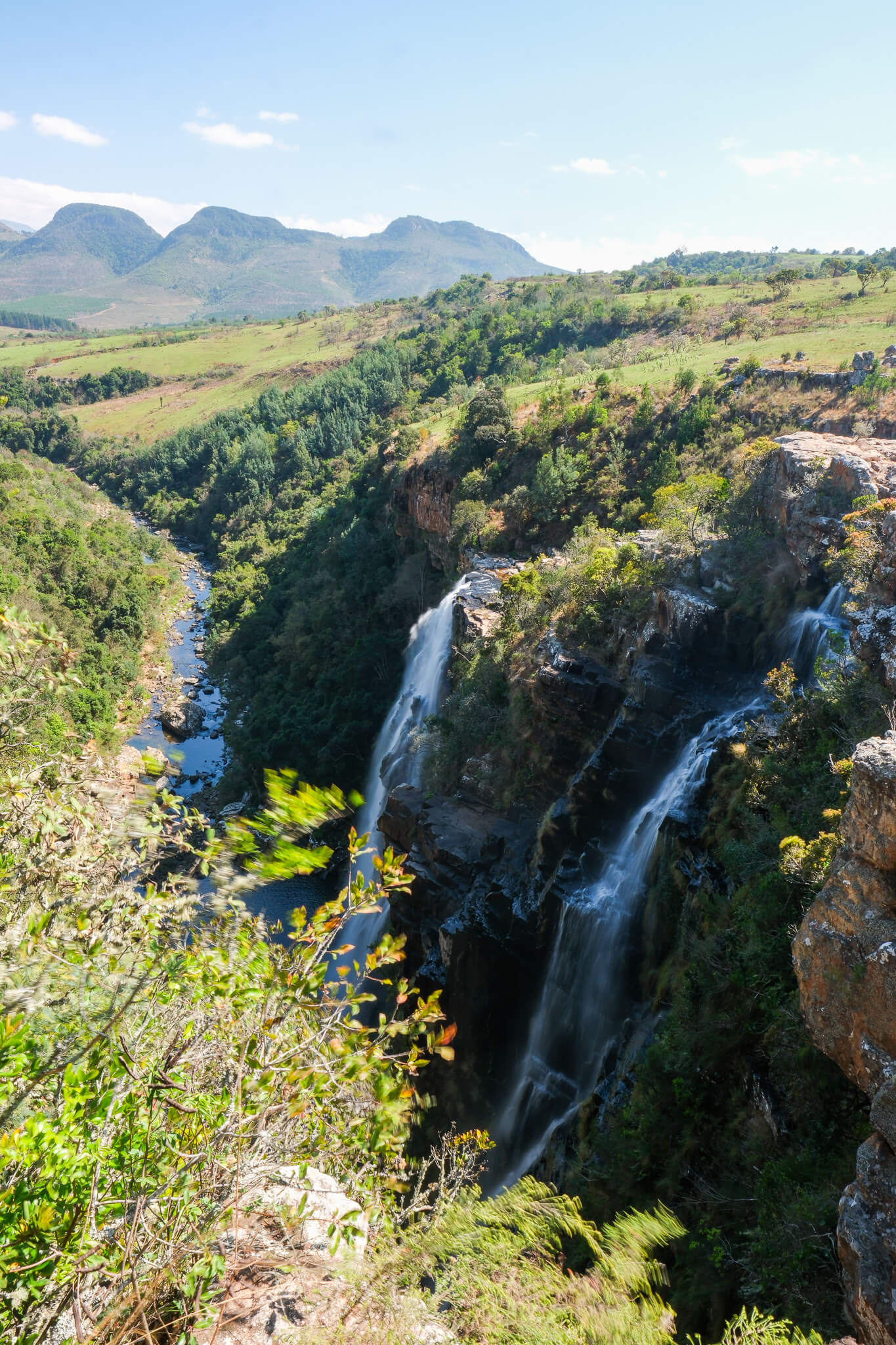
Lisbon Falls in Mpumalanga, South Africa

The Lisbon Falls are falls in the Lisbon Creek, a right bank tributary of the Blyde River. They are situated a short distance north of Graskop beside the R532 road, and are the highest waterfalls in Mpumalanga, South Africa. The waterfalls are 94 metres (308 ft) high and were named for the Lisbon Creek and the Farm Lisbon, on which the falls are located.

Located close to God's Window, they are however just outside the Blyde River Canyon Nature Reserve, as several others like the Berlin Falls, Lone Creek and Mac-Mac Falls. The falls are situated along the Panorama Route.

== See also ==
- List of waterfalls
- List of waterfalls in South Africa
