= List of waterfalls in South Africa =

This is a list of waterfalls in South Africa

Name of Falls	Type of Falls	Province	River	Nearest town	Coördinates	Height of Falls M
Augrabies Falls	cataract	Northern Cape	Orange River	Augrabies (via Upington)	28°34′S 20°18′E	56 metres (184 ft)
Bawa Falls	horsetail	Eastern Cape	Qolorha River	Butterworth		103 metres (338 ft)
Berlin Falls	plunge	Mpumalanga	Lisbon River	Graskop	24°50′S 30°50′E	80 metres (260 ft)
Bridal Veil Falls	plunge	Mpumalanga	Sabie River	Sabie	25°5′S 30°46′E	146 metres (479 ft)
Doorn River Falls		Northern Cape	Doorn River			
Elands River Falls		Mpumalanga	Elands River	between Waterval Boven and Waterval Onder	25°38′6″S 30°20′47″E	150 metres (490 ft)
Forest Falls	block	Mpumalanga		Sabie	24°58′26″S 30°49′03″E	
Howick Falls	punchbowl	KwaZulu-Natal	Umgeni River	Howick		95 metres (312 ft)
Horseshoe Falls		Mpumalanga		Sabie	25°7′S 30°41′E	
Karkloof Falls	Plunge	KwaZulu-Natal	Karlkloof River	Howick		105 metres (344 ft)
Lehrs Falls		KwaZulu-Natal				107 metres (351 ft)
Lisbon Falls	plunge	Mpumalanga	Lisbon River	Graskop	24°51′S 30°50′E	92 metres (302 ft)
Lone Creek Falls	Punchbowl	Mpumalanga	Sabie River	Sabie	25°6′S 30°42′E	68 metres (223 ft)
Mac-Mac Falls	plunge	Mpumalanga	Mac-Mac River	Sabie Graskop	25°0′S 30°48′E	65 metres (213 ft)
Madonna and Child Falls	horsetail	Eastern Cape	Thyume River	Hogsback	32°35′S 26°58′E	29 metres (95 ft)
Magwa Falls		Eastern Cape		Lusikisiki	31°26′S 29°38′E	142 metres (466 ft)
Montrose Falls		Mpumalanga	Crocodile River	Schoemanskloof		12 metres (39 ft)
Ncandu Falls	segmented	KwaZulu-Natal	Ncandu River	Newcastle, KwaZulu-Natal	27.8490°S 29.8440°E	
Sabie Falls		Mpumalanga	Sabie River	Sabie	25°5′S 30°46′E	35 metres (115 ft)
The Thirty-nine Steps Falls	steps	Eastern Cape	Thyume River	Hogsback	32°35′S 26°57′E	22 metres (72 ft)
Treur River Falls		Mpumalanga	Treur River	Graskop, near Bourkes Luck Potholes	24°40′S 30°48′E	
Tugela Falls	tiered	KwaZulu-Natal	Thukela	in Royal Natal National Park	28°45′S 28°53′E	947 metres (3,107 ft)
Tshihovhohovho Falls		Limpopo				
Witpoortjie Falls	two-tiered	Gauteng	Crocodile River (West)	Roodepoort	26°5′32″S 27°50′23″E	70 metres (230 ft)

== See also ==
- List of waterfalls
