= Ncandu Falls =

Waterfall in South Africa

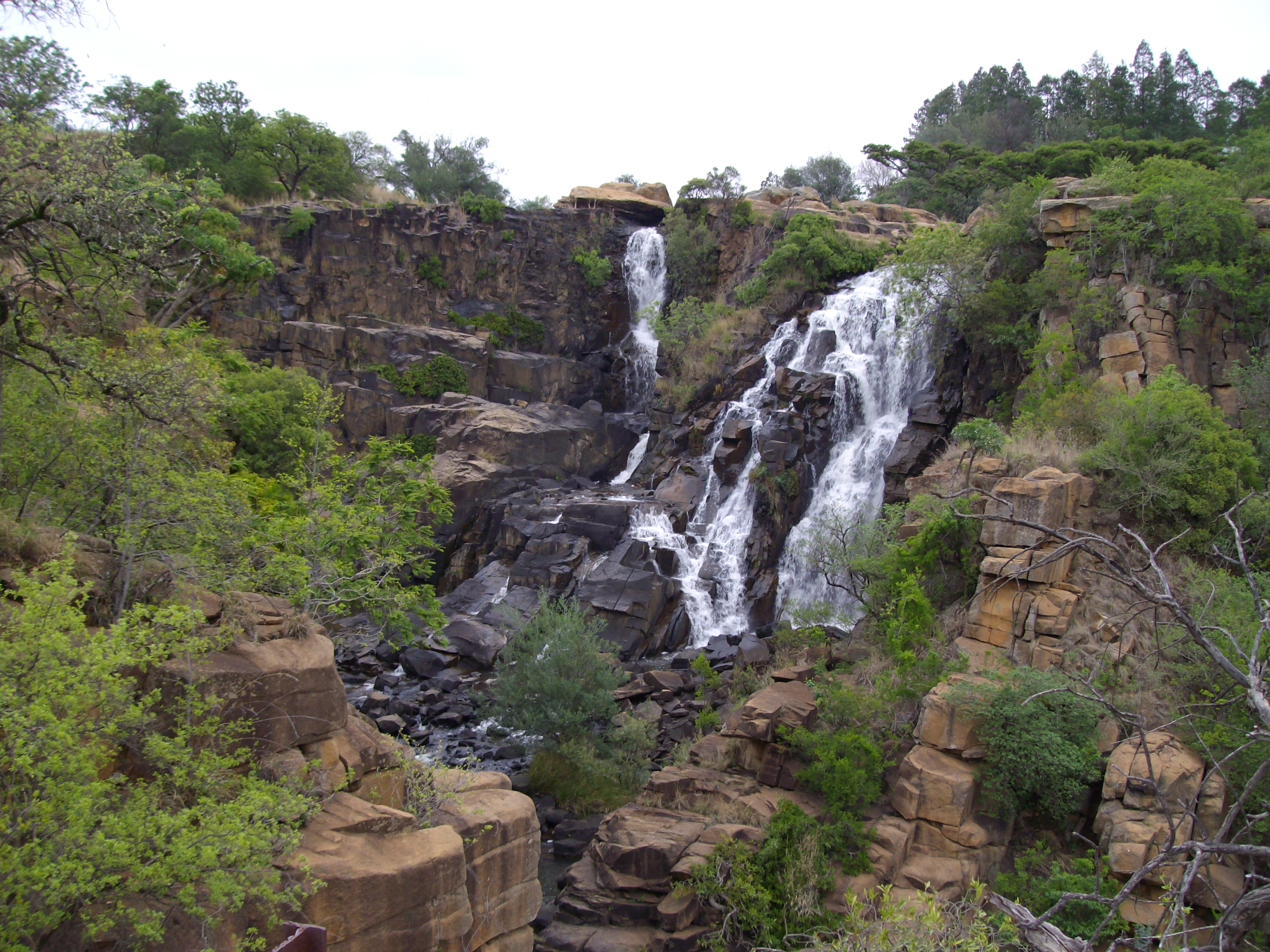
- Ncandu Falls
- Interactive map of Ncandu Falls
- Location: KwaZulu-Natal, South Africa
- Coordinates: 27.8490°S 29.8440°E
- Number of drops: 1
- Watercourse: Ncandu River

Ncandu Falls is a waterfall in the Ncandu River in Northern KwaZulu-Natal, in South Africa close to the town of Newcastle, KwaZulu-Natal. Its name may mean "small flow" in Zulu or a Khosian language.

== See also ==
- List of waterfalls
- List of waterfalls in South Africa
