= Bawa Falls =

Coordinates: 32°23′36″S 28°07′43″E

Bawa Falls are horsetail waterfalls, situated in the Transkei region of the Eastern Cape province, South Africa. The falls have a single drop of 103 m (338 ft) with an average width of 1.5 m (5 ft).

They are located beside the village of KwaNdotshanga, near Butterworth, on a western tributary of the Gcuwa River, which in turn is a northern tributary of the Great Kei River.

== See also ==
- List of waterfalls
- List of waterfalls in South Africa
