= Magwa Falls =

Waterfall in Eastern Cape, South Africa

- Location within South Africa
- Location: Eastern Cape, South Africa
- Coordinates: 31°26′42″S 29°38′20″E
- Total height: 142 m (466 ft)

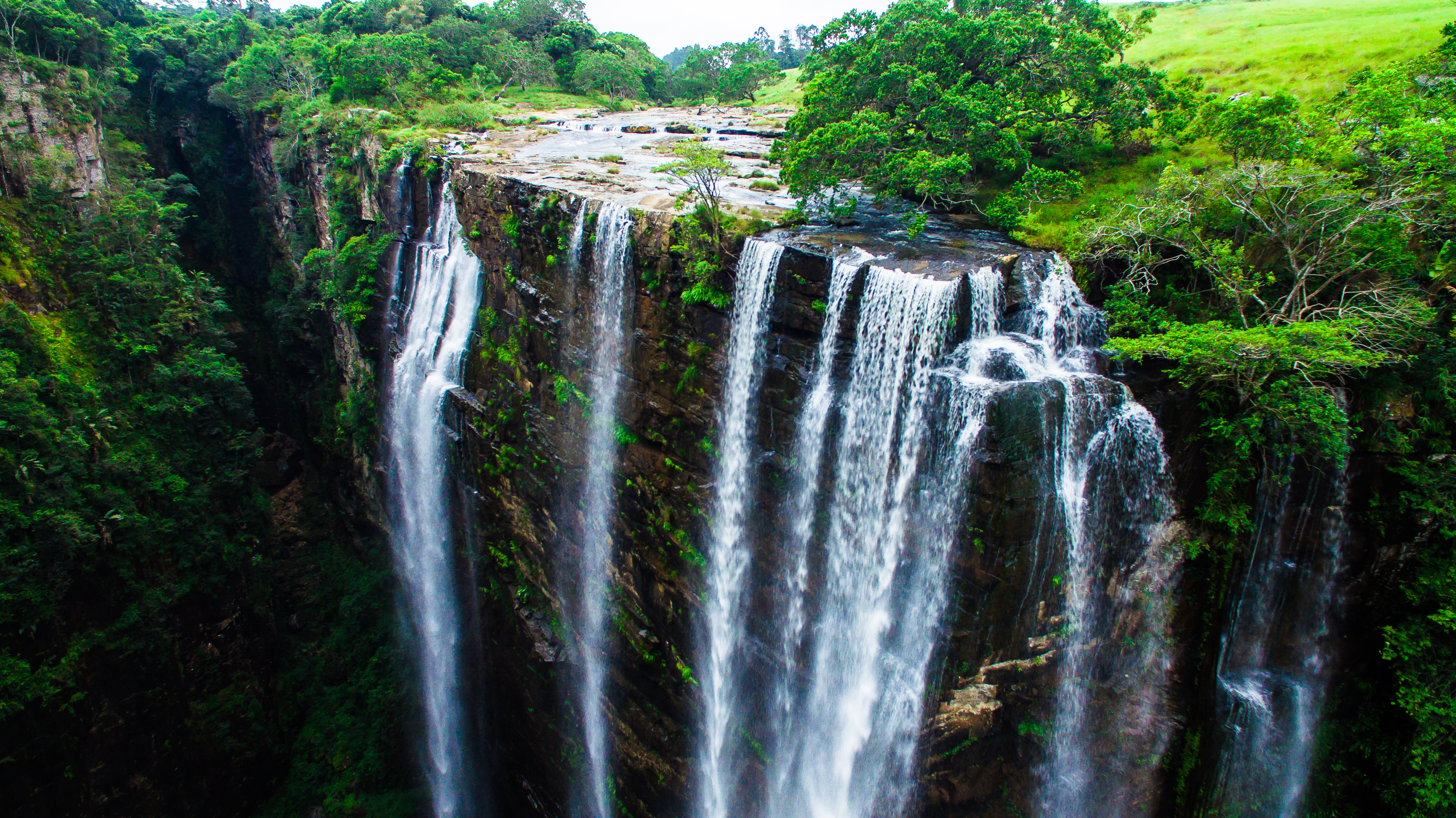
A view of the Magwa Falls. The waterfall is 142 meters high, dropping into a steep gorge.

Magwa Falls is a waterfall in Eastern Cape province in South Africa. The main water drop is 142 metres (466 ft). The nearest town is Lusikisiki.

== See also ==
- List of waterfalls
- List of waterfalls in South Africa
