= Bridal Veil Falls (Sabie) =

Coordinates: 25°04′54″S 30°43′27″E

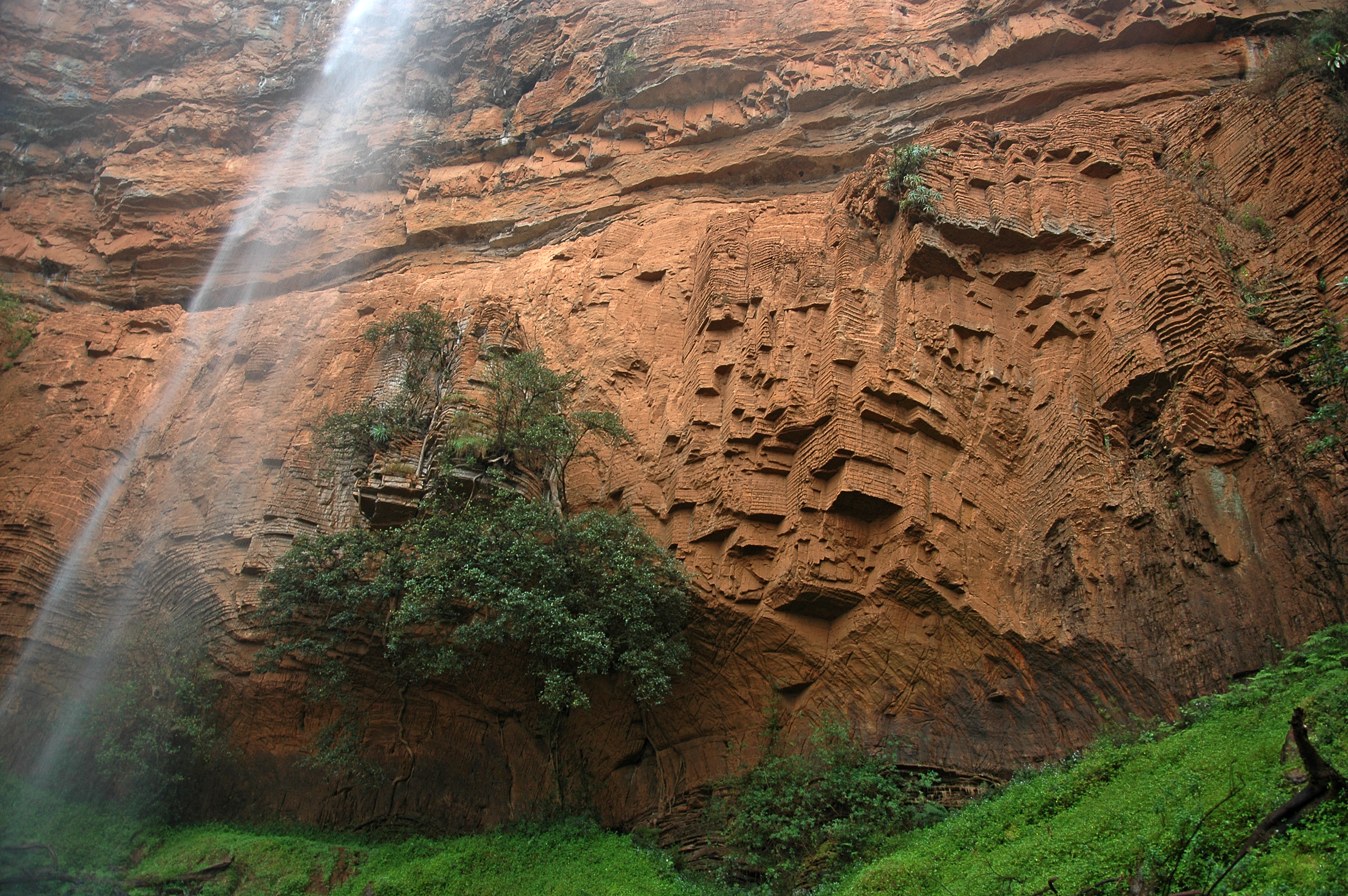
Bridal Veil waterfall, Sabie area

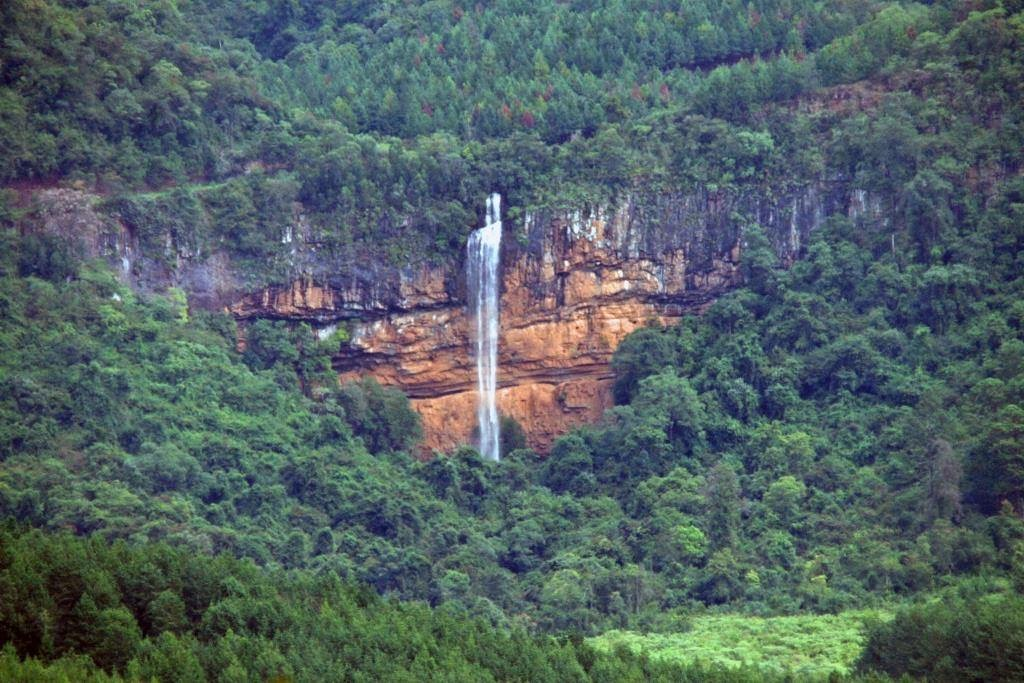
Distant view of the falls

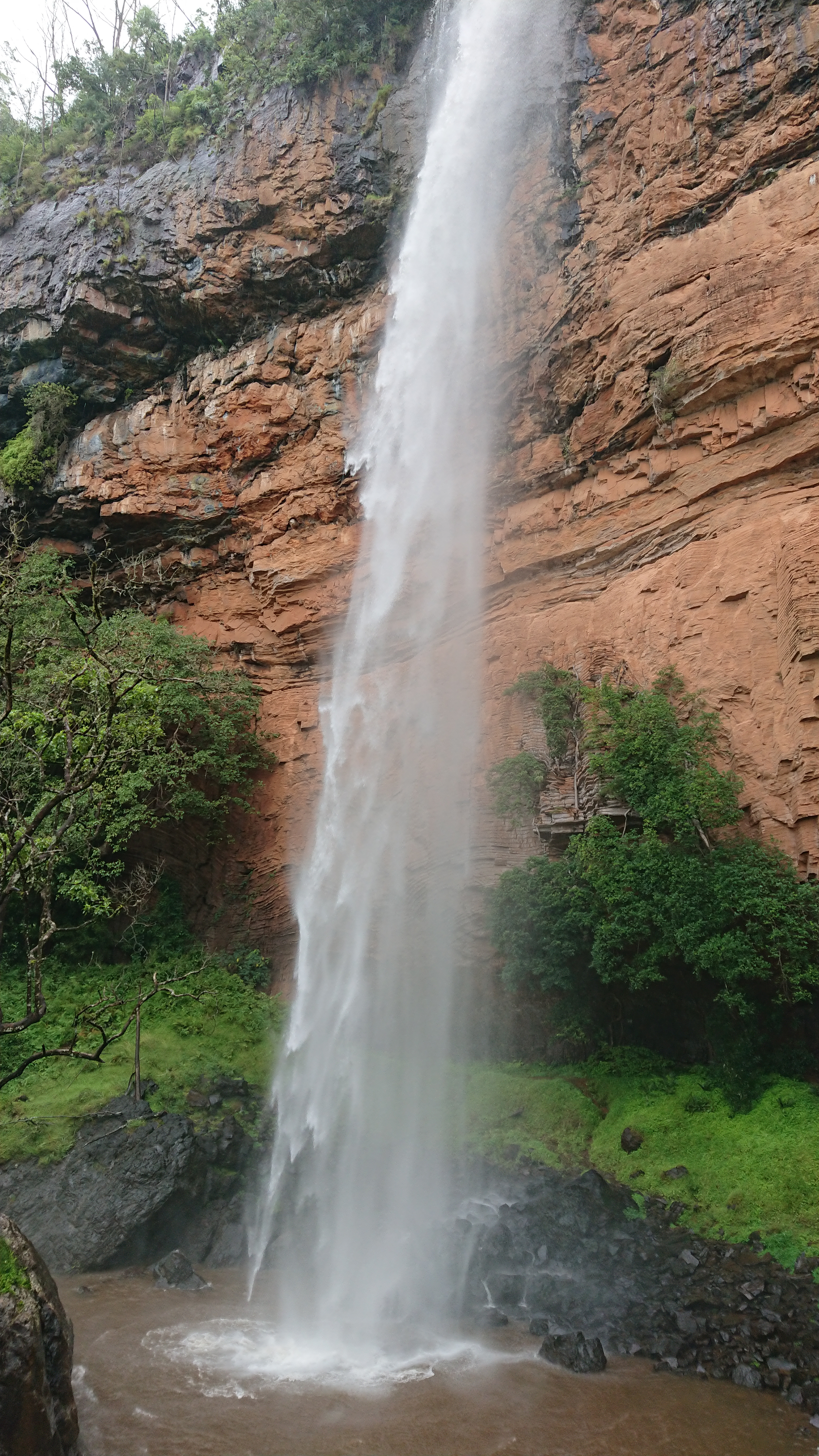
The Bridal Veil Falls during heavy rains in February 2019.

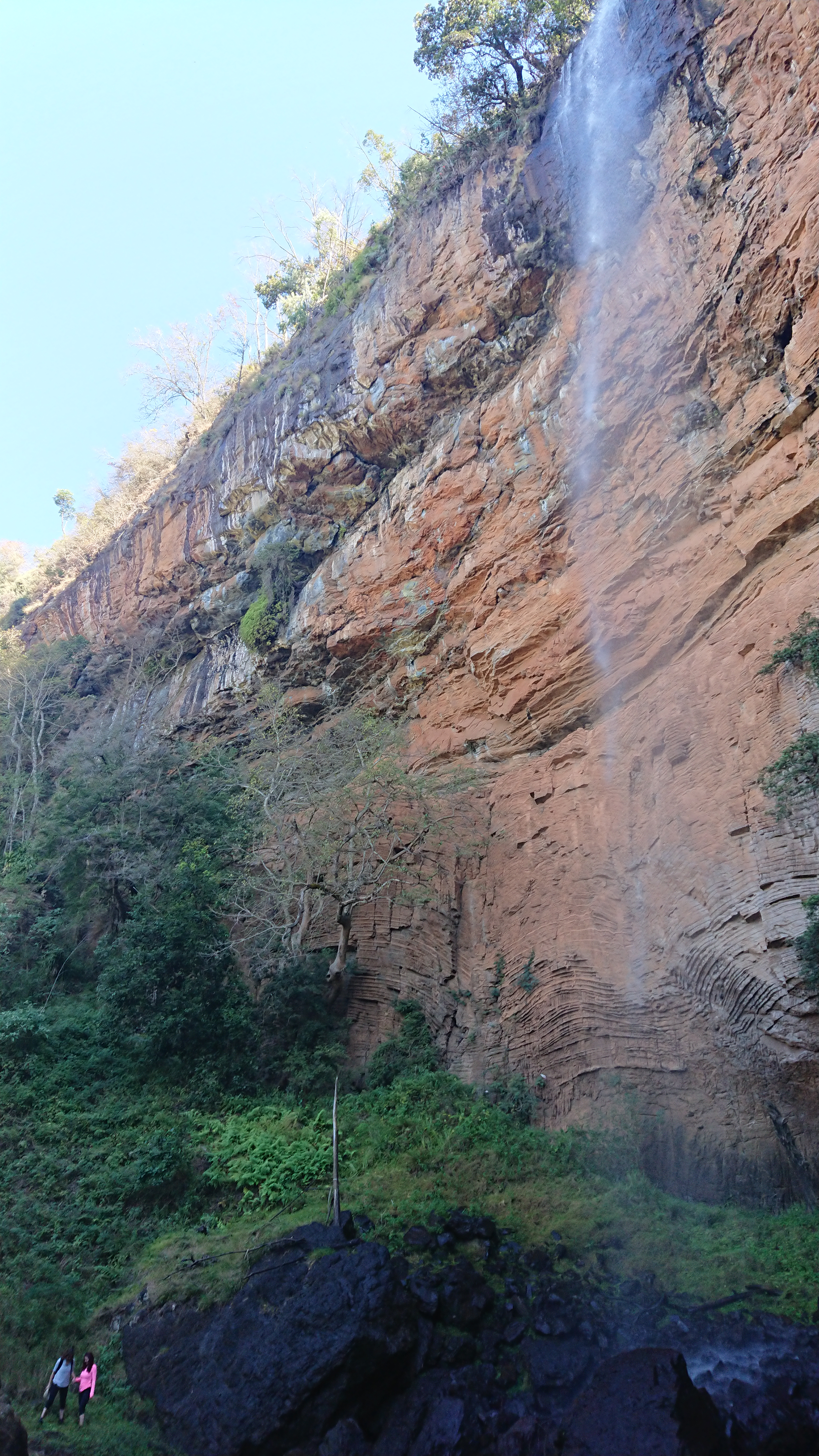
The Bridal Veil Falls with two tourists at the bottom.

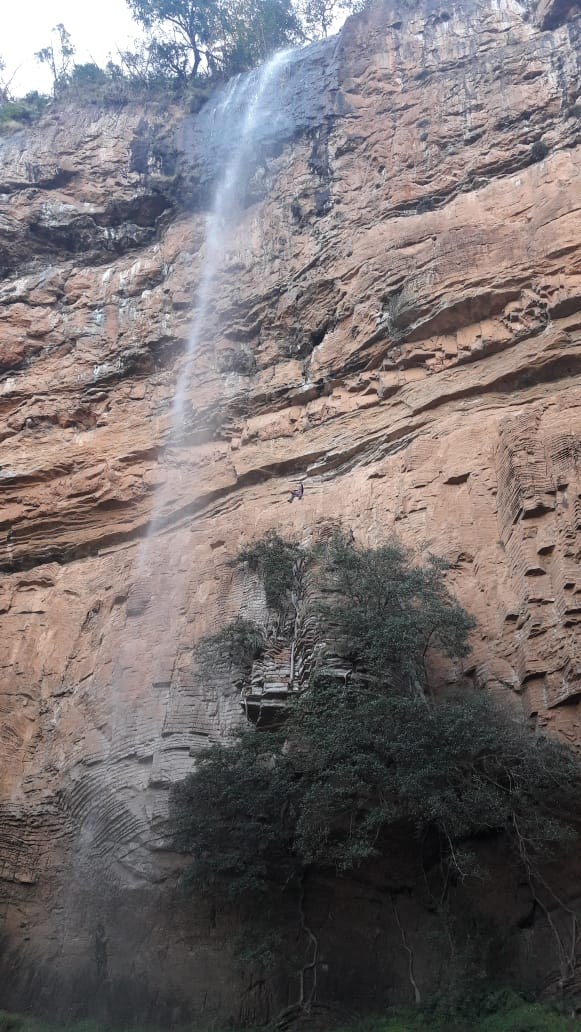
The Bridal Veil Falls with a tourist sitting on a ledge halfway up and to the right of the falls.

The Bridal Veil Falls is six kilometres outside Sabie, Mpumalanga in South Africa. It is 70 metres high. The falls is slow flowing under normal conditions making it appear like a veil, hence its name. It is one of many waterfalls in the area that is located on the Sabie River and is a popular tourist destination. It is accessible by car, with parking and a picnic area on SAFCOL's grounds.From the car park, a footpath runs through indigenous forest for about 750 metres (15 minutes' walk) directly to the waterfall.

== Tourism ==
The Bridal Veil falls is on the Panorama route and in an area that contains more waterfalls than any other part of Southern Africa. Day tourists regularly visit these falls and pay a nominal fee to view them. The Bridal Veil Falls is also an attraction on the Loerie Trail day hike which is 10 kilometres long but also has a shorter option of approximately 6 kilometres that begins and ends at the falls themselves. The falls is also part of the popular Fanie Botha hiking trail which is a five-day hiking trail in total, but has shorter trail options available as well.

== See also ==
- List of waterfalls
- List of waterfalls in South Africa
