= Horseshoe Falls (South Africa) =

Coordinates: 25°7′50″S 30°41′41″E

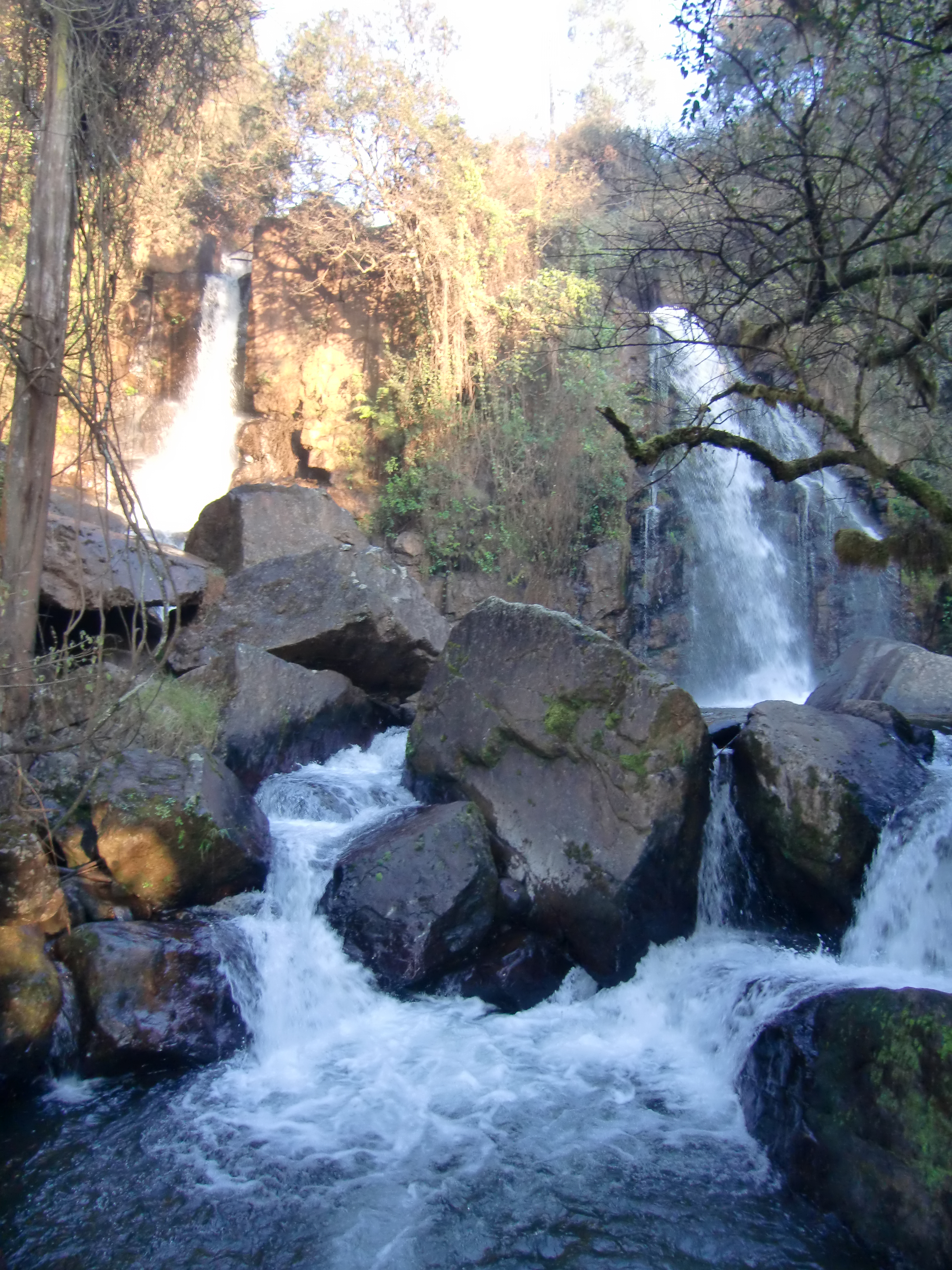
The waterfall on a winter's morning (dry season)

The Horseshoe Falls of South Africa are located 4 km off the Old Lydenburg Road along the Sabie River in Mpumalanga. These unusual falls, although not very high, are horseshoe shaped and have been declared a national monument. A short walk through an attractive landscape brings the visitor to the cascade-type falls. Here one also has the opportunity to spot some of the local birdlife or other wildlife. Although it is easy to navigate to, a small fee is charged to get into the park where this beautiful attraction may be enjoyed. Horseshoe Falls is also a popular venue for trout fishing.

== Other attractions ==
The amphitheatre in the uKhahlamba Drakensberg Park, also in South Africa, has massive cliffs that are in the shape of a horseshoe that could be confused as horseshoe falls.
