= Sabie =

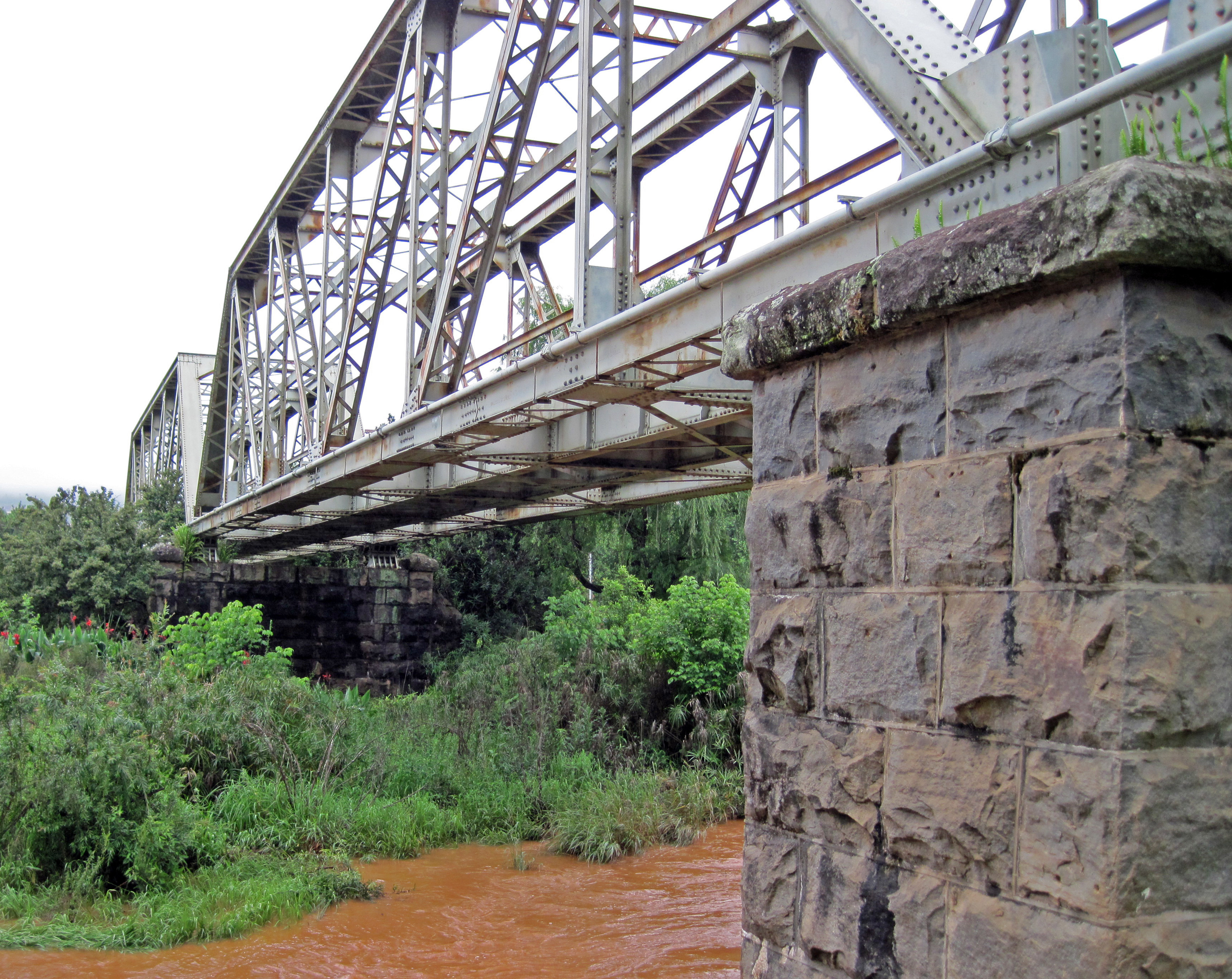
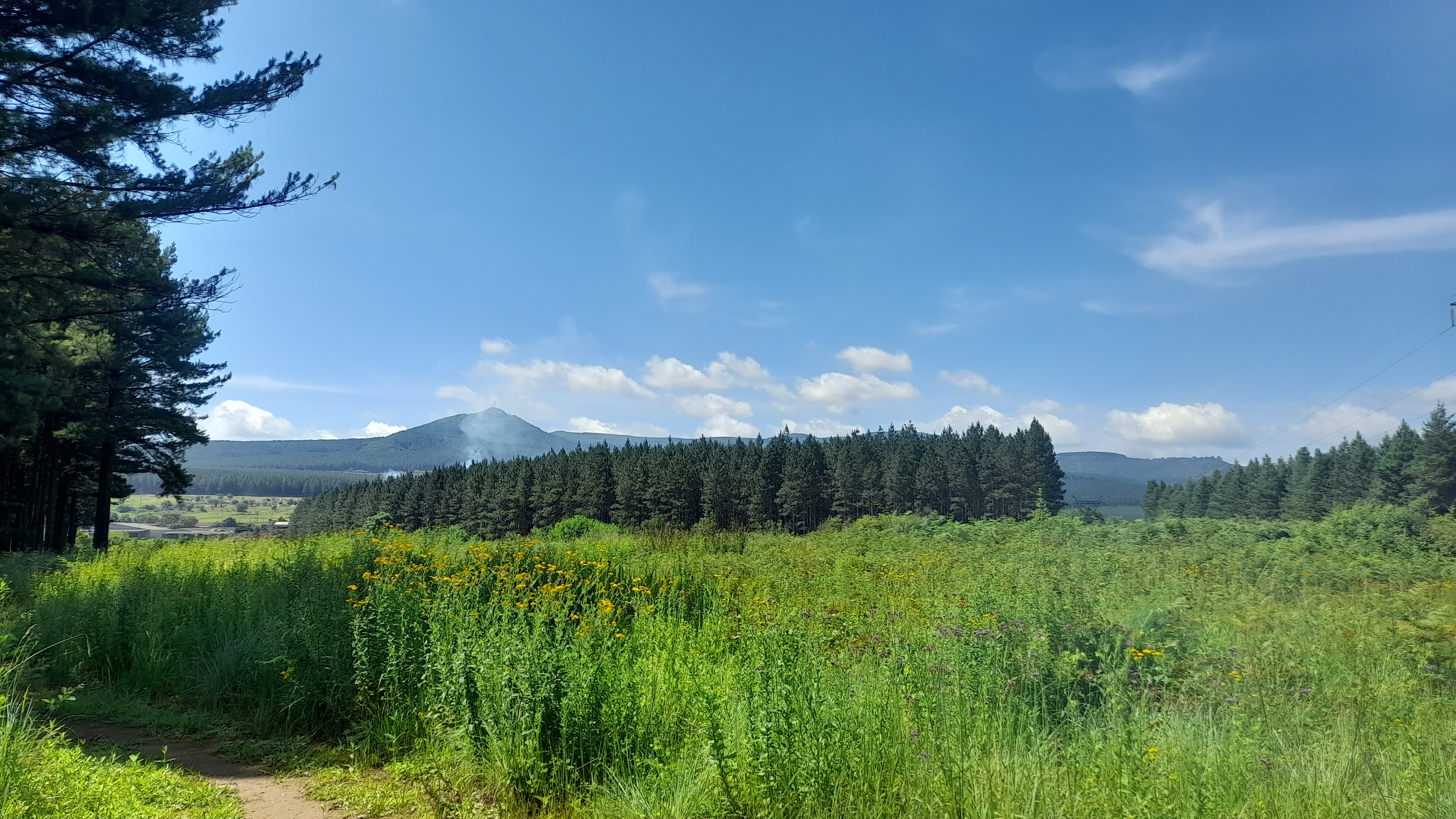
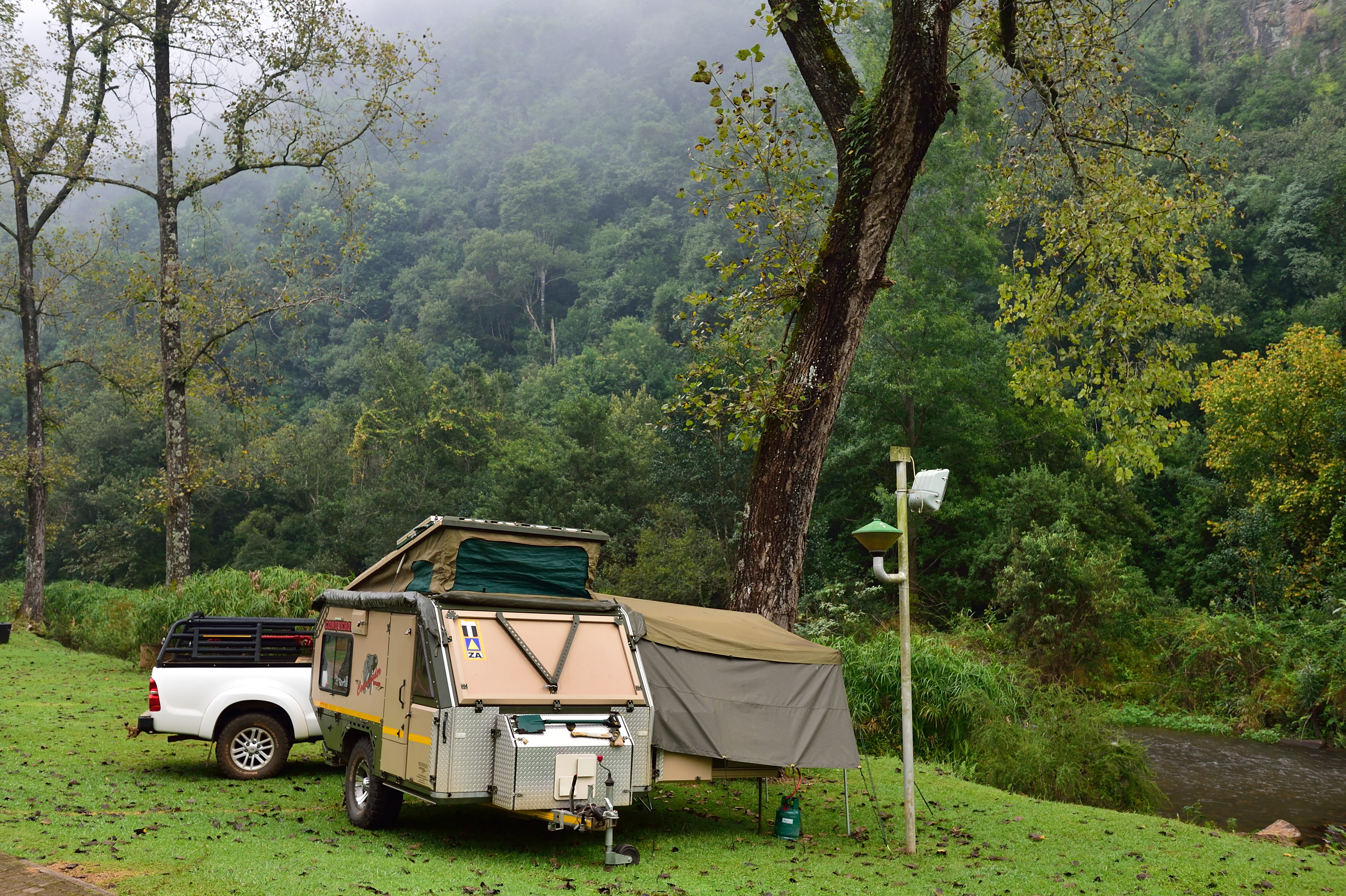
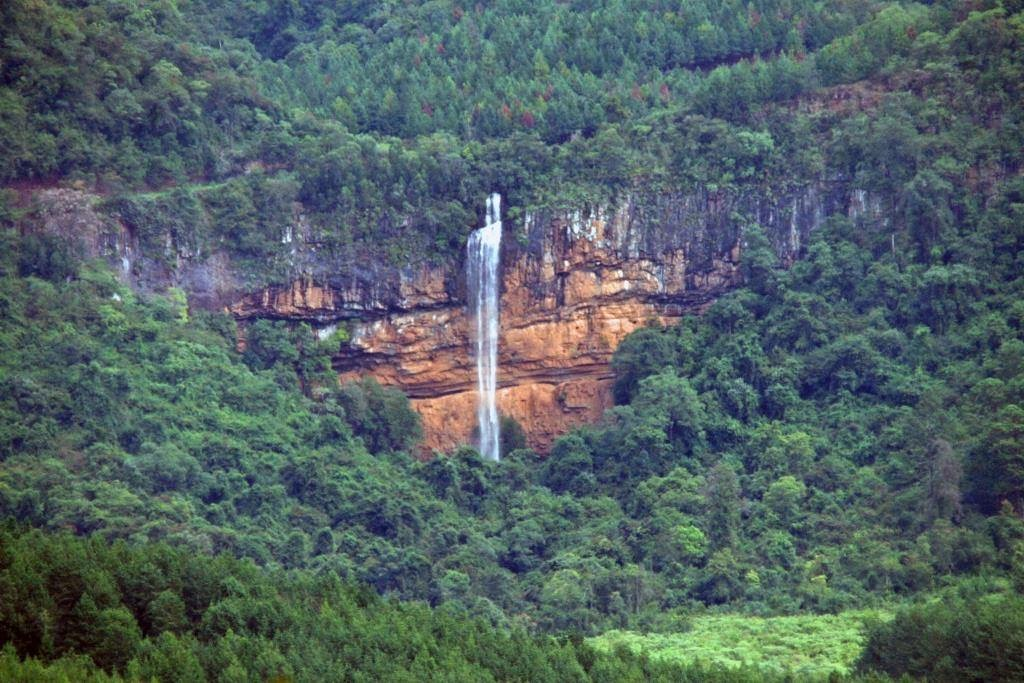
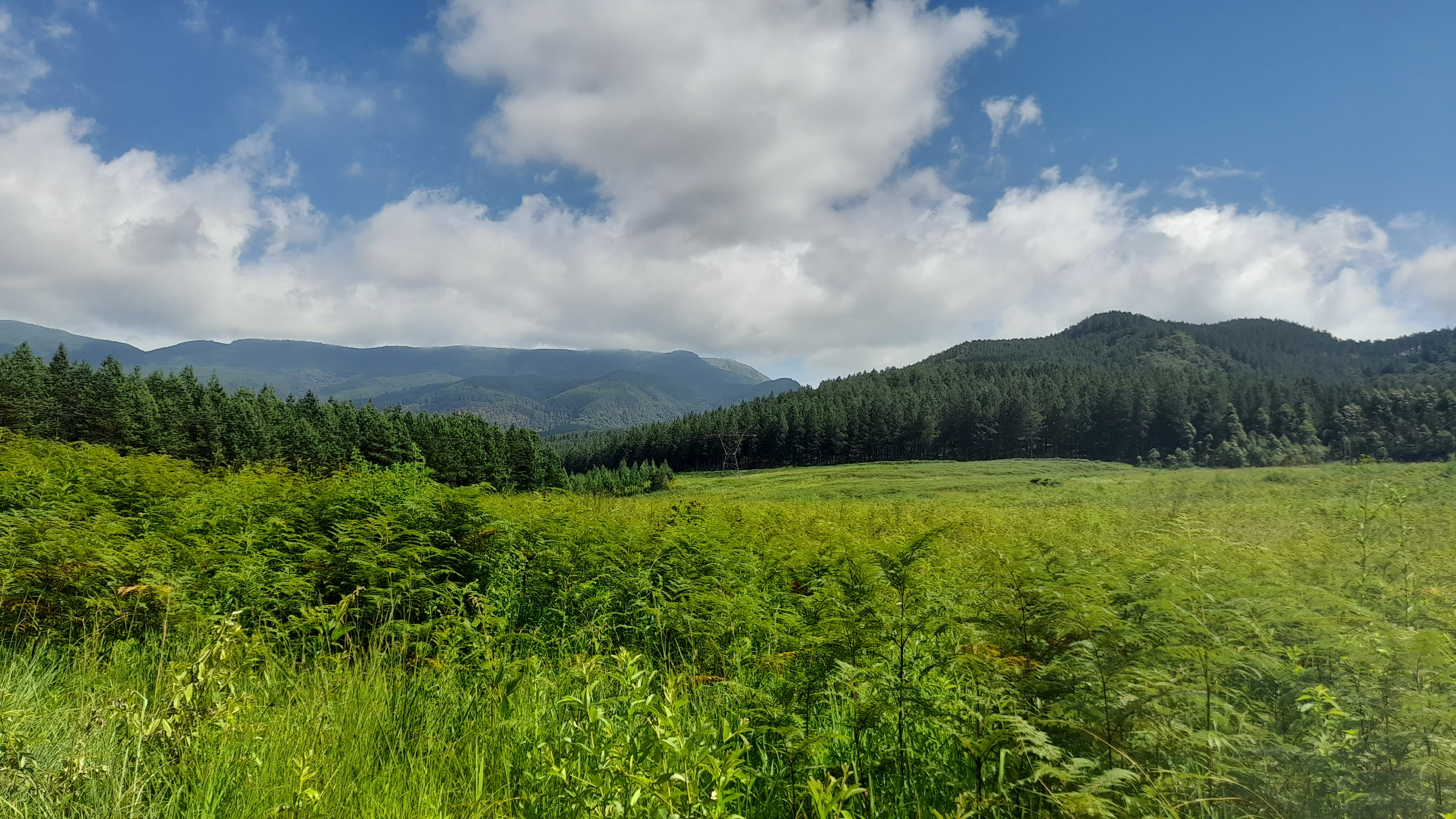
- Clockwise from top: Old train bridge in Sabie, Merry Pebbles Resort, countryside near Sabie, Bridal Veil Falls, forestry and countryside near Sabie.

- Location within Mpumalanga Location within South Africa
- Coordinates: 25°05′52″S 30°46′45″E
- Country: South Africa
- Province: Mpumalanga
- District: Ehlanzeni
- Municipality: Thaba Chweu

Area
  - Total: 55.03 km^{2} (21.25 sq mi)

Population (2011)
  - Total: 9,148
  - Density: 166.2/km^{2} (430.6/sq mi)

Racial makeup (2011)
  - Black African: 60.8%
  - Coloured: 8.0%
  - Indian/Asian: 0.5%
  - White: 30.1%
  - Other: 0.6%

First languages (2011)
  - Afrikaans: 33.4%
  - Swazi: 23.9%
  - Sotho: 14.5%
  - English: 10.4%
  - Other: 17.8%
- Time zone: UTC+2 (SAST)
- Postal code (street): 1260
- PO box: 1260
- Area code: 013

Sabie is a town in Thaba Chweu Local Municipality of Mpumalanga province, South Africa.

Sabie is a forestry town situated on the banks of the Sabie River in Mpumalanga, South Africa. The name Sabie is derived from the siSwati word ulusaba, a reference to the crocodiles in the river. The word was corrupted by the Afrikaner settlers who changed into Sabie.

The town was started after H.T. Glynn and J.C. Ingle found gold there and formed the Glynns-Lydenburg Gold Mining Company.

Sabie is located 360 km (220 mi) east of Johannesburg and 64 km (40 mi) west of the popular Kruger National Park. It is known for its scenery and beautiful waterfalls, and is a popular tourist destination.

Its main industry is forestry. The plantations surrounding Sabie form one of the world's largest man-made forests.

It is situated approximately 1,066 metres (3,497 feet) above sea level and is in the summer rainfall area. During the winter period, there is little rainfall, and the area can become intensely dry. Forest fires are prevalent during this time, therefore precautions are taken beforehand to create fire breaks, as well as to incorporate block burning.

Sabie is also a tourism based town and relies on the steady flow of tourists year round to keep the community economy going. There are many attractions in and around the town itself. Of these the most popular is the Lone Creek Falls about 10 km (6 mi) outside town. There are many other waterfalls in the area, such as the Bridal Veil, Maria Shire, Horseshoe, Forest Falls, and the Sabie River falls situated within the town itself.

A large portion of the tourism is taken up by the mountain bikers that make their way to the downhill slaloms in the pine forests. One of these is the Noon to Moon which is a 10-hour endurance relay race for teams of 3. Teams complete as many laps as possible around a 7.5 km (5 mi) course of single track. The start is at 12 noon from the Castle Rock Camp site in Sabie and includes 3 hours of night riding. There are many kilometres of flowing single tracks which make this town attractive to mountain bikers.

There is also trout fly fishing in the Sabie River which is regularly stocked. Permits are required to fish.

Sabie has its own brewery located on 45 Main road.

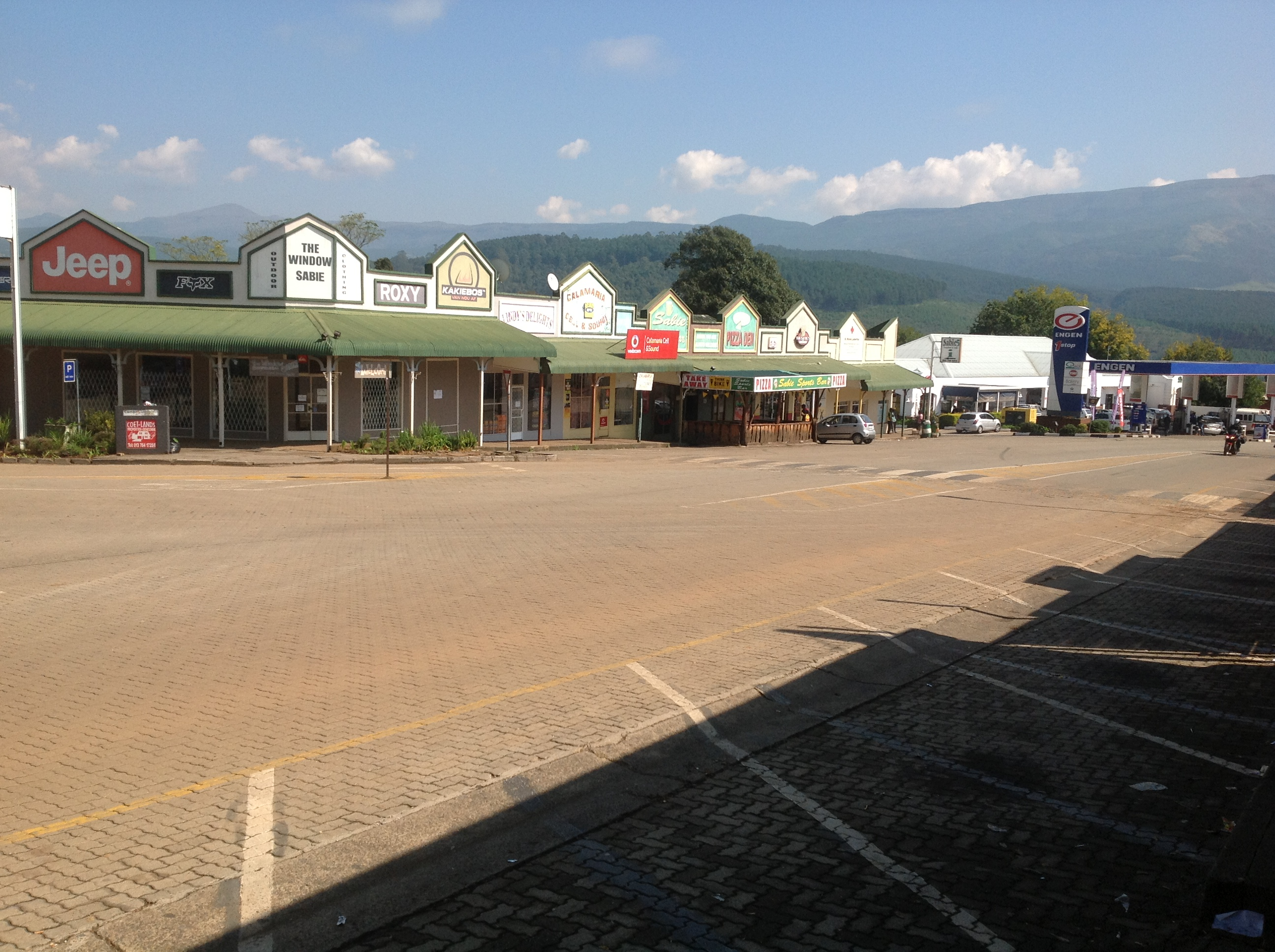
The main street of Sabie is home to several shops and businesses.
