= Lone Creek Falls =

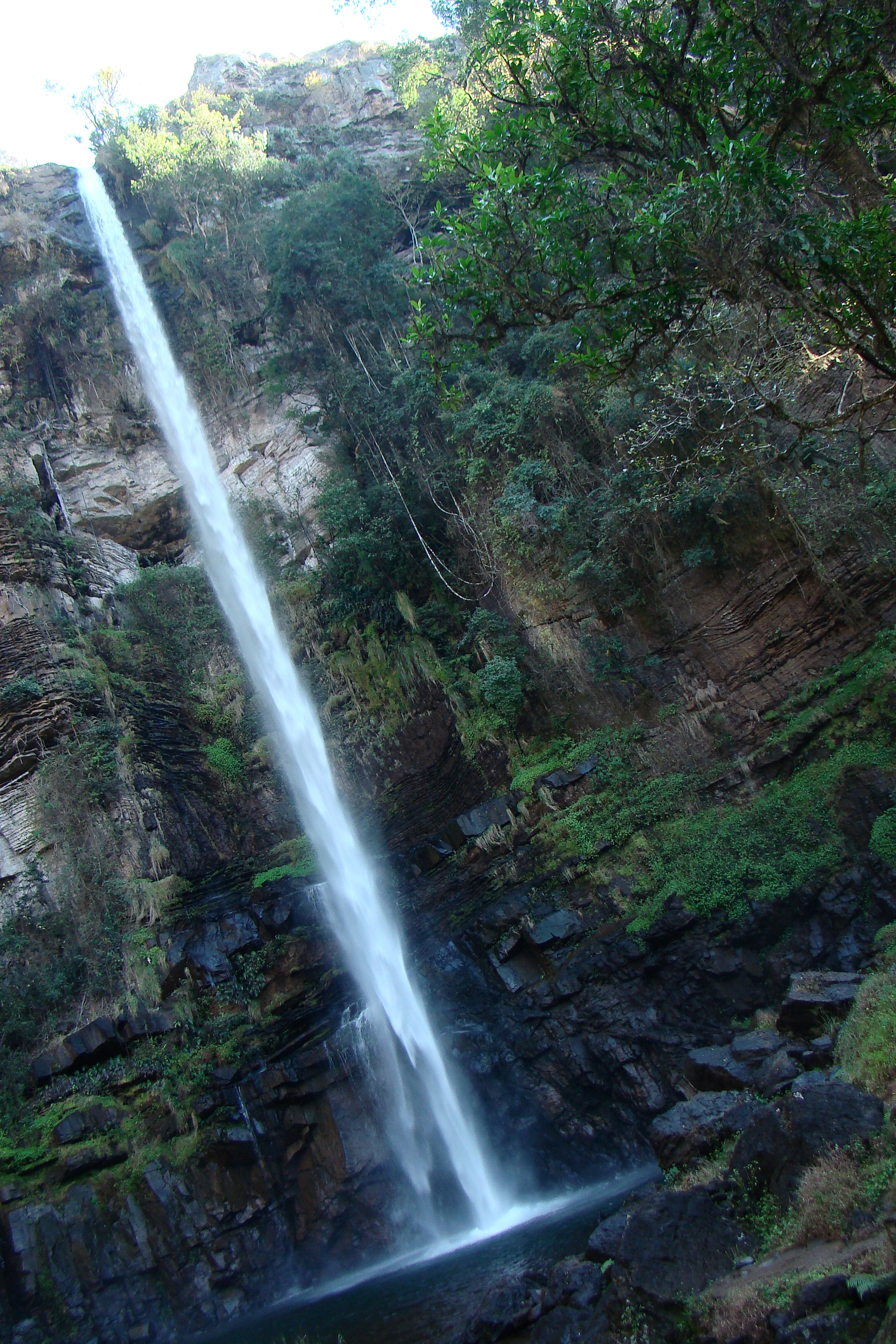
- Lone Creek Falls - full height
- Interactive map of Lone Creek Falls
- Location: Mpumalanga, South Africa
- Total height: 70 m (230 ft)
- Number of drops: 1
- Watercourse: Blyde River

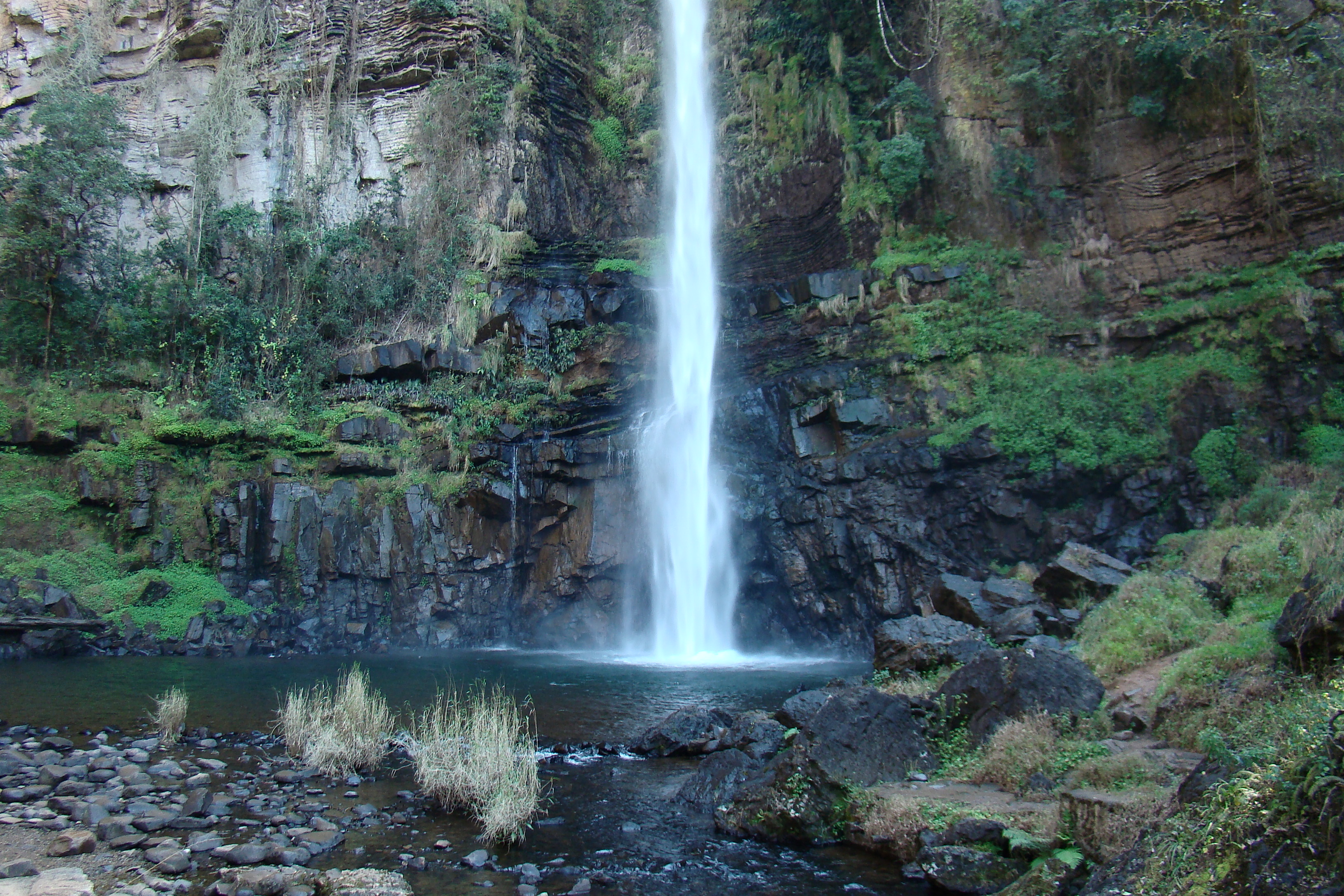
Lone Creek, 9 km from Sabie.

The Lone Creek Falls is near Sabie in Mpumalanga, South Africa. The waterfall plummets 70 m down into the Creek. The waterfall was declared a National Monument.

== See also ==
- List of waterfalls
- List of waterfalls in South Africa
